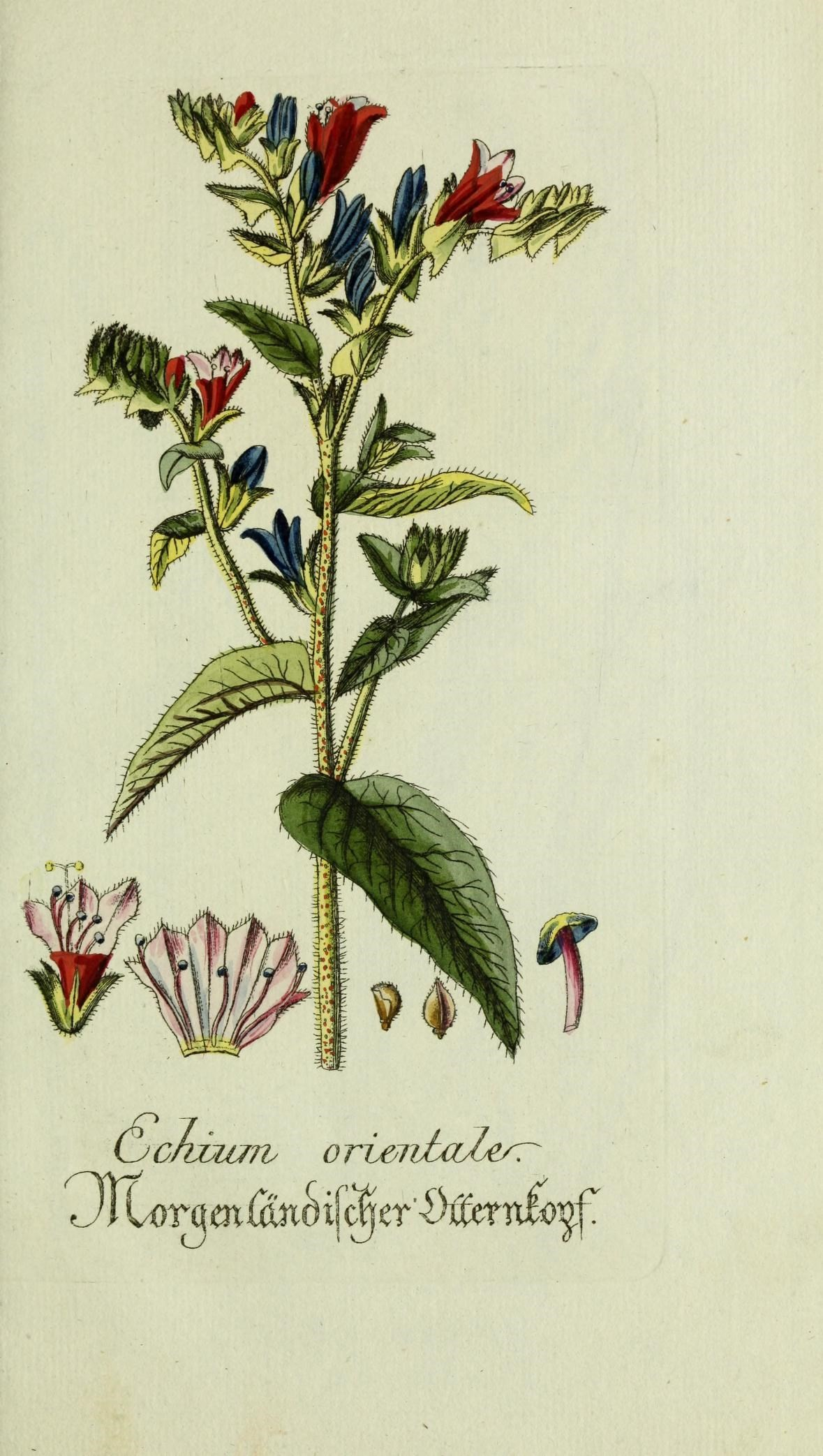

Scientific classification
- Kingdom: Plantae
- Clade: Tracheophytes
- Clade: Angiosperms
- Clade: Eudicots
- Clade: Asterids
- Order: Boraginales
- Family: Boraginaceae
- Genus: Megacaryon; Boiss. (1875)
- Species: M. orientale

Binomial name
- Megacaryon orientale (L.) Boiss. (1875)

Synonyms
- Echium orientale L. (1753); Echium grandiflorum Salisb. (1796); Megacaryon armenum Boiss. (1875); Onosma megalosperma Boiss. (1875)

= Megacaryon =

Genus of flowering plants

Megacaryon orientale is a rare species of flowering plant in the borage family (Boraginaceae). It is the sole species in genus Megacaryon. It is a biennial native to the Black Sea region of northern Turkey. First documented by European botanists in the early 1700s, this plant grows quite large for its family, producing enormous basal leaves that can reach over 60 centimetres in length and 30 centimetres in width. It grows in small clearings within humid beech and fir forests at elevations between 1050 and 1500 metres above sea level. Megacaryon orientale is known for its unusually large, glossy fruits—much bigger than those of its relatives—and its slightly asymmetrical flowers. The plant has had a complicated scientific history, being reclassified several times since its first formal description by Carl Linnaeus in 1753, with modern genetic studies confirming it deserves its own distinct genus.

== Description ==
Megacaryon orientale is a tall herbaceous plant with a "megaherb-like" habit, reaching substantial size compared to related genera. The plant produces very large basal leaves, up to 65 cm long and 30 cm wide. While sometimes described as biennial, field observations suggest it may be perennial in its natural habitat.

The flowers are mildly zygomorphic (slightly bilaterally symmetrical) with a corolla that is less distinctly bilabiate than in related genera such as Echium. The stamens have filaments of different lengths but are inserted at approximately the same height in the lower part of the corolla wall. The plant lacks an annulus (ring of tissue) at the base of the corolla tube, which distinguishes it from related genera.

A distinctive feature of Megacaryon orientale is its fruit morphology. Unlike most members of the family Boraginaceae that typically develop four nutlets (dry, seed-like fruits), Megacaryon usually develops only one or two nutlets per flower, with the others aborting early in development. The remaining nutlets grow exceptionally large (approximately 7.5 by 6 mm), with a wide ovoid-subglobose shape, slightly beaked apex, and an almost smooth, glossy surface. This contrasts with the smaller, trigonous-triquetrous nutlets with tuberculate-scrobiculate (rough, pitted) surfaces found in related genera like Echium.

In terms of pollen morphology, Megacaryon produces relatively small, heteropolar (asymmetrical between poles), ovate-triangular pollen grains with a punctate-perforate tectum pattern similar to that found in the genus Onosma, rather than the reticulate to micro-reticulate pattern characteristic of Echium.

Cytologically, Megacaryon orientale is a diploid species with 2n=12 chromosomes, differing from the chromosome numbers typically found in Lobostemon (2n=14) and Echium (usually 2n=16).

== Distribution and habitat ==
Megacaryon orientale is endemic to the mountains of the Black Sea region in northern Turkey. It grows in small patches in clearings within extensive Abies nordmanniana–Fagus orientalis (Nordmann fir–Oriental beech) forests, typically at elevations between 1050 and 1500 metres above sea level.

The plant shares its humid mountain forest habitat with other large-leaved Boraginaceae species such as Brunnera macrophylla and Trachystemon orientalis, which are also endemic to this region. The species is considered rare.

== Taxonomy ==
The taxonomic history of Megacaryon orientale has been complex. The plant was first observed and illustrated by Joseph Pitton de Tournefort during his travels in Asia Minor in 1701–1702. It was formally described by Carl Linnaeus in 1753 as Echium orientale based on cultivated material, likely grown from seeds collected by Tournefort.

More than a century later, in 1875, the Swiss botanist Pierre Edmond Boissier described what he thought was a new species, naming it Megacaryon armenum and placing it in a new monotypic genus. Boissier soon recognised that his species and Linnaeus's Echium orientale were the same plant and made the new combination Megacaryon orientale (L.) Boiss. After Boissier's work, the genus Megacaryon was only recognised by a few botanists such as Maximilian Gürke, while most subsequent authors followed Ivan Murray Johnston's 1953 opinion and included the species in Echium as E. orientale.

Molecular phylogenetics studies based on nuclear and plastid DNA sequences have shown that Megacaryon orientale does not belong within the genus Echium but represents a distinct lineage within the "Echium alliance" (which includes Echium, Pontechium, and Lobostemon). The exact relationships between these groups remain somewhat uncertain, but molecular, morphological, and karyological evidence supports recognising Megacaryon as a separate monotypic genus.
