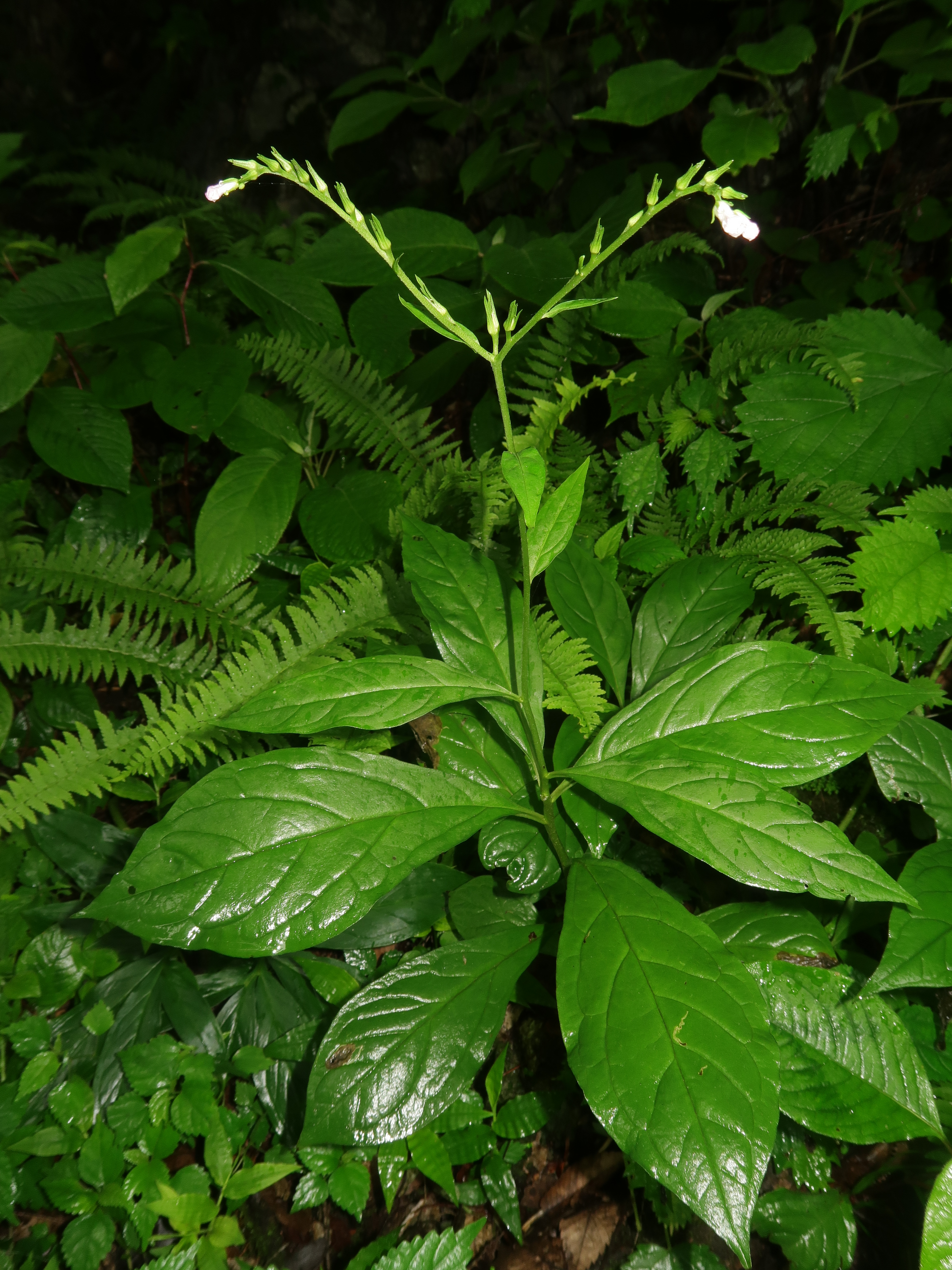
- Ancistrocarya japonica, Japan 2021

Scientific classification
- Kingdom: Plantae
- Clade: Tracheophytes
- Clade: Angiosperms
- Clade: Eudicots
- Clade: Asterids
- Order: Boraginales
- Family: Boraginaceae
- Genus: Ancistrocarya; Maxim. (1872)
- Species: A. japonica

Binomial name
- Ancistrocarya japonica Maxim. (1872)

= Ancistrocarya =

Genus of flowering plants

Ancistrocarya is a genus of flowering plants belonging to the family Boraginaceae. The genus is monotypic, only containing the species Ancistrocarya japonica Maxim.

The native range of this species is Japan and Korea.
