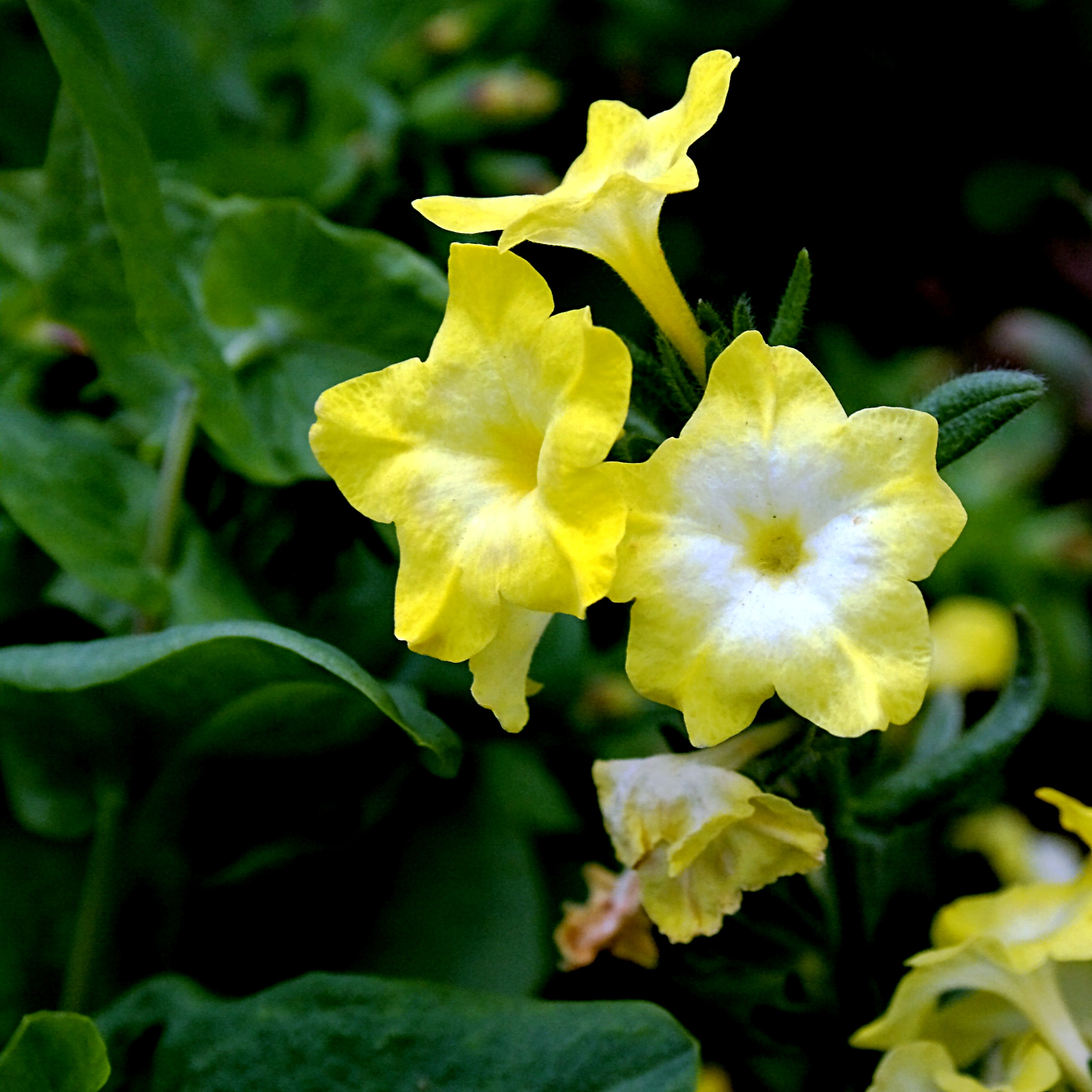
- Arnebia pulchra, synonym of Huynhia pulchra

Scientific classification
- Kingdom: Plantae
- Clade: Tracheophytes
- Clade: Angiosperms
- Clade: Eudicots
- Clade: Asterids
- Order: Boraginales
- Family: Boraginaceae
- Genus: Huynhia; Greuter

= Huynhia =

Genus of flowering plants

Huynhia is a genus of flowering plants belonging to the family Boraginaceae, from Asia.

It is native to Iran, North Caucasus (within Russia), Transcaucasus (or Armenia, Georgia, and Azerbaijan), and Turkey.

The genus was circumscribed by Werner Greuter in Willdenowia vol.11 on page 37 in 1981.

The position of Huynhia within the Boraginaceae family remains unresolved. The genus was previously monotypic with just Huynhia pulchra (or Arnebia pulchra) in 1981 but then Huynhia purpurea was discovered in 2015. Arnebia pulchra is still used in some sources.

The genus name of Huynhia is in honour of Kim-Lang Huynh (b.1935), a Swiss botanist working at the University of Neuchâtel.

== Description ==
It is a perennial herb, with a stout pleiocorm (a system of compact and perennial shoots occurring at the proximal end of the persistent primary root). It has basal and cauline (on the stem) leaves; the basal leaves are oblong and the cauline leaves are narrowly ovate. The inflorescence is a dense, bracteose cymoid (resembling a cyme). The flowers are distylous, with a divided calyx nearly to the base with the lobes obtuse, but not hardening and without thickened nerves or angular projections when in fruit. The corolla is hypocrateriform (Salver shaped), with a narrow tube, puberulent (covered with minute soft erect hairs) outside, without faucal (the throat of a calyx or corolla) scales or annulus and with a spreading limb. The stamens are inserted at 2 different levels below the throat. The stigma is capitate bilobed (like a divided pin head). The nutlets (small fruit/ seed capsules) are erect, ovoid-subglobose (in shape), apically acute and shortly beaked, ventrally keeled and finely tuberculate-scrobiculate (having very small pits).

== Species ==
2 known accepted species by Kew;

- Huynhia pulchra (Willd. ex Roem. & Schult.) Greuter & Burdet
- Huynhia purpurea (Erik & Sümbül) L.Cecchi & Selvi

== Other sources ==
- Coppi, A. 2015. Arnebia purpurea: a new member of formerly monotypic genus Huynhia (Boraginaceae-Lithospermeae). Phytotaxa 204:123-136. DOI: 10.11646/phytotaxa.204.2.3.
- Greuter, W. 1981. Med-Checklist Notulae, 3. Willdenowia 11:37.
- Riedl, H. 1992. Adelocaryum Brand and Brandella R. Mill. (Boraginaceae). Linzer Biol. Beitr. 24:19-27.
