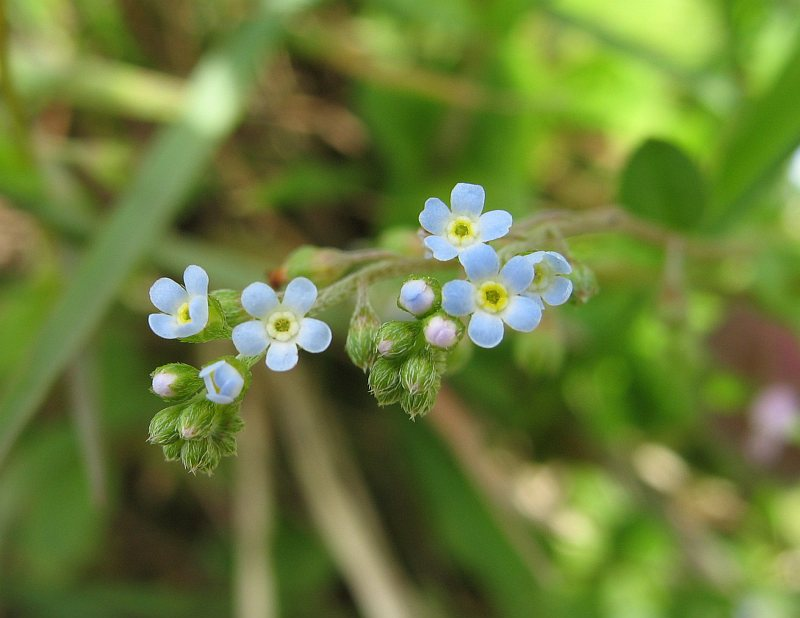
- Trigonotis peduncularis

Scientific classification
- Kingdom: Plantae
- Clade: Tracheophytes
- Clade: Angiosperms
- Clade: Eudicots
- Clade: Asterids
- Order: Boraginales
- Family: Boraginaceae
- Genus: Trigonotis; Steven (1851)

Species
- 70; see text

Synonyms
- Endogonia (Turcz.) Lindl. (1846), non. Endogona Raf.; Havilandia Stapf (1894); Pedinogyne Brand (1925); Stephanocaryum Popov (1951); Zoelleria Warb. (1892)

= Trigonotis =

Genus of flowering plants

Trigonotis is a genus of flowering plants belonging to the family Boraginaceae. It includes 70 species which range from southern European Russia to Asia and New Guinea.

== Species ==
70 species are accepted.

- Trigonotis abata I.M.Johnst.
- Trigonotis apoensis Elmer
- Trigonotis barkamensis C.J.Wang
- Trigonotis borneensis (Stapf) I.M.Johnst.
- Trigonotis bracteata C.J.Wang
- Trigonotis brevipes (Maxim.) Maxim.
- Trigonotis caespitosa S.P.Banerjee
- Trigonotis cavaleriei (H.Lév.) Hand.-Mazz.
- Trigonotis chengkouensis W.T.Wang
- Trigonotis ciliolata I.M.Johnst.
- Trigonotis cinereifolia C.J.Wang
- Trigonotis clarkei R.R.Mill
- Trigonotis compressa I.M.Johnst.
- Trigonotis corispermoides C.J.Wang
- Trigonotis culminicola P.Royen
- Trigonotis delicatula Hand.-Mazz.
- Trigonotis doormanensis B.Xue
- Trigonotis floribunda I.M.Johnst.
- Trigonotis formosana Hayata
- Trigonotis funingensis H.Chuang
- Trigonotis giraldii Brand
- Trigonotis gracilipes I.M.Johnst.
- Trigonotis guilielmi (A.Gray) Gürke
- Trigonotis haackei F.Muell.
- Trigonotis harrysmithii R.R.Mill
- Trigonotis heliotropifolia Hand.-Mazz.
- Trigonotis hirsuta Steenis
- Trigonotis hookeri Benth. ex C.B.Clarke
- Trigonotis icumae (Maxim.) Makino
- Trigonotis inoblita F.Muell.
- Trigonotis jiaochengensis Q.R.Liu & R.Y.Yan
- Trigonotis jinfoshanica W.T.Wang
- Trigonotis laxa I.M.Johnst.
- Trigonotis leucantha W.T.Wang
- Trigonotis leyeensis W.T.Wang
- Trigonotis longipes W.T.Wang
- Trigonotis longiramosa W.T.Wang
- Trigonotis macrophylla Vaniot
- Trigonotis mairei (H.Lév.) I.M.Johnst.
- Trigonotis microcarpa (DC.) Benth. ex C.B.Clarke
- Trigonotis minuta (Wernham) I.M.Johnst.
- Trigonotis mollis Hemsl.
- Trigonotis motuoensis Q.R.Liu & Xue M.Xu
- Trigonotis muliensis W.T.Wang
- Trigonotis myosotidea (Maxim.) Maxim.
- Trigonotis nandanensis C.J.Wang
- Trigonotis nankotaizanensis (Sasaki) Masam. & Ohwi
- Trigonotis olgae B.Fedtsch.
- Trigonotis omeiensis Matsuda
- Trigonotis opaca (I.M.Johnst.) I.M.Johnst.
- Trigonotis orbicularifolia C.J.Wang
- Trigonotis ovalifolia (Wall.) Benth. ex C.B.Clarke
- Trigonotis papuana (Hemsl.) I.M.Johnst.
- Trigonotis peduncularis (Trevir.) Benth. ex F.B.Forbes & Hemsl.
- Trigonotis petiolaris Maxim.
- Trigonotis philippinensis Merr.
- Trigonotis pleiomera I.M.Johnst.
- Trigonotis popovii (Kamelin) Sennikov
- Trigonotis procumbens (Warb.) I.M.Johnst.
- Trigonotis radicans (A.DC.) Steven
- Trigonotis robusta (I.M.Johnst.) I.M.Johnst.
- Trigonotis rockii I.M.Johnst.
- Trigonotis rotundata I.M.Johnst.
- Trigonotis rotundifolia (A.DC.) Benth. ex C.B.Clarke
- Trigonotis smithii S.P.Banerjee
- Trigonotis subrosulata Riedl
- Trigonotis tenera I.M.Johnst.
- Trigonotis tibetica (C.B.Clarke) I.M.Johnst.
- Trigonotis vestita (Hemsl.) I.M.Johnst.
- Trigonotis zhuokejiensis W.T.Wang
