= Pseudolappula =

Scientific classification
- Kingdom: Plantae
- Clade: Tracheophytes
- Clade: Angiosperms
- Clade: Eudicots
- Clade: Asterids
- Order: Boraginales
- Family: Boraginaceae
- Genus: Pseudolappula; Khoshsokhan & Kaz.Osaloo (2018)
- Species: P. sinaica

Binomial name
- Pseudolappula sinaica (A.DC.) Khoshsokhan, Sherafati & Kaz.Osaloo (2018)

Synonyms
- Cynoglossospermum divaricatum (Bunge) Kuntze (1891); Cynoglossospermum sinaicum (A.DC.) Kuntze (1891); Echinospermum divaricatum Bunge (1852); Echinospermum sinaicum A.DC. (1846); Echinospermum kotschyi Boiss. (1846); Lappula divaricata B.Fedtsch. (1915); Lappula sinaica (A.DC.) Asch. & Schweinf. (1887)

Genus of flowering plants

Pseudolappula sinaica is a species of flowering plant in the family Boraginaceae. It is the sole species in genus Pseudolappula. It is an annual native to western and central Asia, ranging from Turkey and the Sinai through Saudi Arabia, Iraq, Iran, the Transcaucasus, Afghanistan, and Central Asia to Pakistan, the western Himalayas, and Xinjiang, where it grows in deserts and dry shrublands.
