= Microula =

Scientific classification
- Kingdom: Plantae
- Clade: Tracheophytes
- Clade: Angiosperms
- Clade: Eudicots
- Clade: Asterids
- Order: Boraginales
- Family: Boraginaceae
- Genus: Microula; Benth. (1876)

Synonyms
- Schistocaryum Franch. (1891); Tretocarya Maxim. (1882)

Genus of plants

Microula is a genus of flowering plants belonging to the family Boraginaceae.

Its native range is Himalaya to China.

== Species ==
34 species are accepted.

- Microula bhutanica (T.Yamaz.) H.Hara
- Microula blepharolepis (Maxim.) I.M.Johnst.
- Microula ciliaris (Bureau & Franch.) I.M.Johnst.
- Microula diffusa (Maxim.) I.M.Johnst.
- Microula efoveolata W.T.Wang
- Microula filicaulis W.T.Wang
- Microula floribunda W.T.Wang
- Microula forrestii (Diels) I.M.Johnst.
- Microula galactantha W.T.Yu, S.T.Chen & Z.K.Zhou
- Microula hispidissima W.T.Wang
- Microula involucriformis W.T.Wang
- Microula jilongensis W.T.Wang
- Microula leiocarpa W.T.Wang
- Microula leucantha W.T.Wang
- Microula longipes W.T.Wang
- Microula longituba W.T.Wang
- Microula muliensis W.T.Wang
- Microula mustangensis Yonek.
- Microula myosotidea (Franch.) I.M.Johnst.
- Microula oblongifolia Hand.-Mazz.
- Microula ovalifolia (Bureau & Franch.) I.M.Johnst.
- Microula pentagona W.T.Yu, S.T.Chen & Z.K.Zhou
- Microula polygonoides W.T.Wang
- Microula pseudotrichocarpa W.T.Wang
- Microula pustulosa (C.B.Clarke) Duthie
- Microula rockii I.M.Johnst.
- Microula roseiflora W.T.Yu
- Microula sikkimensis (C.B.Clarke) Hemsl.
- Microula spathulata W.T.Wang
- Microula stenophylla W.T.Wang
- Microula tangutica Maxim.
- Microula tibetica Benth.
- Microula trichocarpa (Maxim.) I.M.Johnst.
- Microula turbinata W.T.Wang
- Microula younghusbandii Duthie
