= Ailuroglossum =

Scientific classification
- Kingdom: Plantae
- Clade: Tracheophytes
- Clade: Angiosperms
- Clade: Eudicots
- Clade: Asterids
- Order: Boraginales
- Family: Boraginaceae
- Genus: Ailuroglossum; Sutorý

Genus of flowering plants

Ailuroglossum is a genus of flowering plants belonging to the family Boraginaceae.

Its native range is Southern Central China.

Species:

- Ailuroglossum breviglochidiatum Sutorý
- Ailuroglossum triste (Diels) Sutorý
