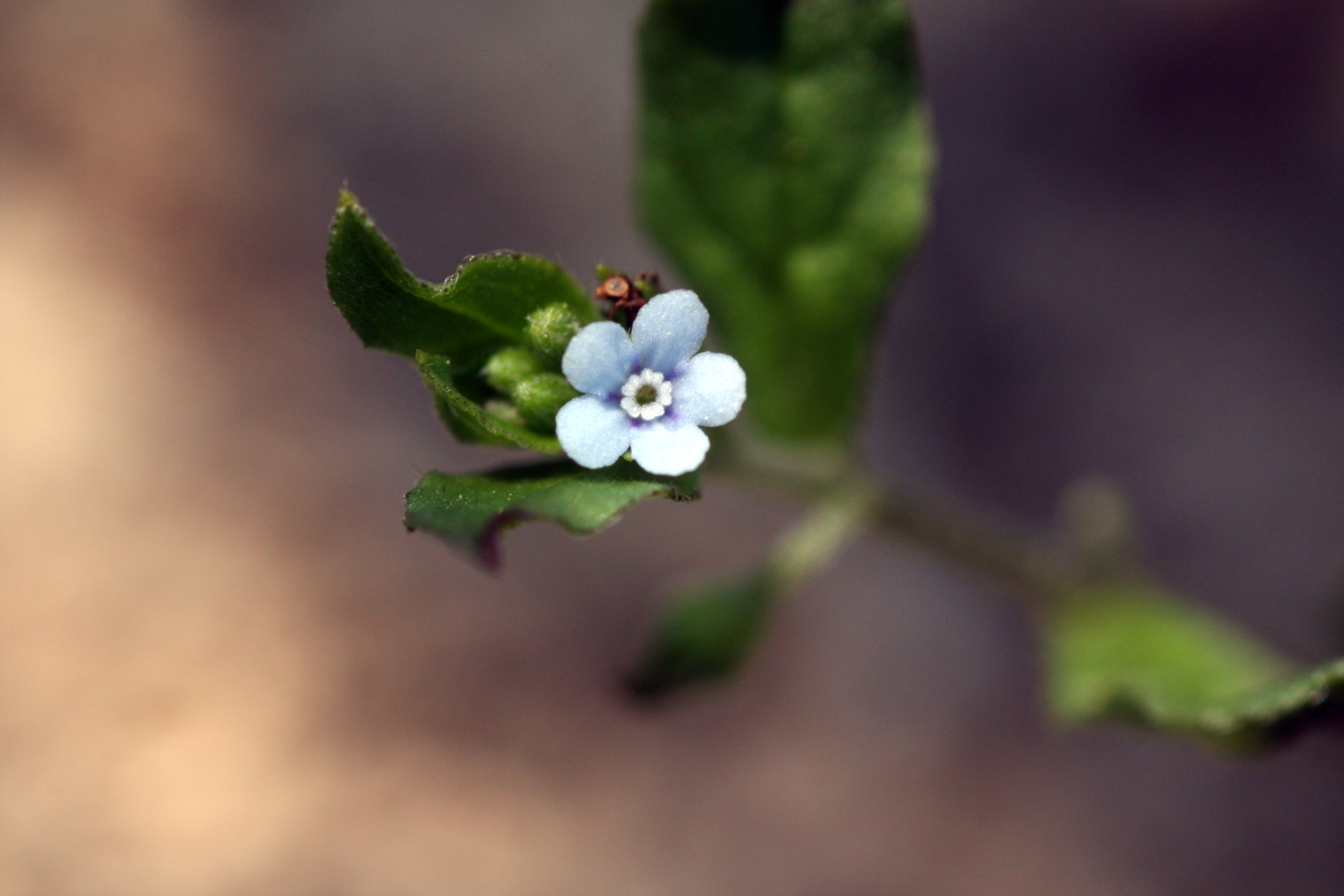

Scientific classification
- Kingdom: Plantae
- Clade: Tracheophytes
- Clade: Angiosperms
- Clade: Eudicots
- Clade: Asterids
- Order: Boraginales
- Family: Boraginaceae
- Genus: Bothriospermum; Bunge

= Bothriospermum =

Genus of flowering plants

Bothriospermum is a genus of flowering plants belonging to the family Boraginaceae.

Its native range is Tropical and Subtropical Asia to Mongolia.

Species:

- Bothriospermum chinense Bunge
- Bothriospermum hispidissimum Hand.-Mazz.
- Bothriospermum kusnetzowii Bunge ex A.DC.
- Bothriospermum longistylum Q.W.Lin & Bing Liu
- Bothriospermum secundum Maxim.
- Bothriospermum zeylanicum (J.Jacq.) Druce
