= Brandella =

Scientific classification
- Kingdom: Plantae
- Clade: Tracheophytes
- Clade: Angiosperms
- Clade: Eudicots
- Clade: Asterids
- Order: Boraginales
- Family: Boraginaceae
- Genus: Brandella; R.R.Mill
- Species: B. erythraea

Binomial name
- Brandella erythraea (Brand) R.R.Mill

Synonyms
- Adelocaryum erythraeum Brand; Adelocaryum erythraeum f. subexalatum Riedl; Brandella erythraea f. subexalata (Riedl) R.R.Mill; Cynoglossum erythraeum (Brand) Riedl; Paracaryum erythraeum Schweinf. ex Brand, pro syn.

Genus of flowering plants

Brandella is a genus of flowering plants belonging to the family Boraginaceae.

It contains a single species, Brandella erythraea, an annual or perennial native to Sudan, Eritrea, and Ethiopia in northeastern tropical Africa and Saudi Arabia on the Arabian Peninsula, where it grows in deserts and dry shrublands.

The species was first described as Adelocaryum erythraeum by August Brand in 1921. In 1986 it was placed in its own genus as Brandella erythraea.
