= Tianschaniella =

Scientific classification
- Kingdom: Plantae
- Clade: Tracheophytes
- Clade: Angiosperms
- Clade: Eudicots
- Clade: Asterids
- Order: Boraginales
- Family: Boraginaceae
- Genus: Tianschaniella; B.Fedtsch. ex Popov (1951)
- Species: T. umbellulifera

Binomial name
- Tianschaniella umbellulifera B.Fedtsch. ex Popov (1951)

Synonyms
- Lappula umbellulifera (B.Fedtsch. ex Popov) Sennikov (2021)

Genus of flowering plants

Tianschaniella is a genus of flowering plants belonging to the family Boraginaceae. It contains a single species, Tianschaniella umbellulifera, which is endemic to Kyrgyzstan in Central Asia.
