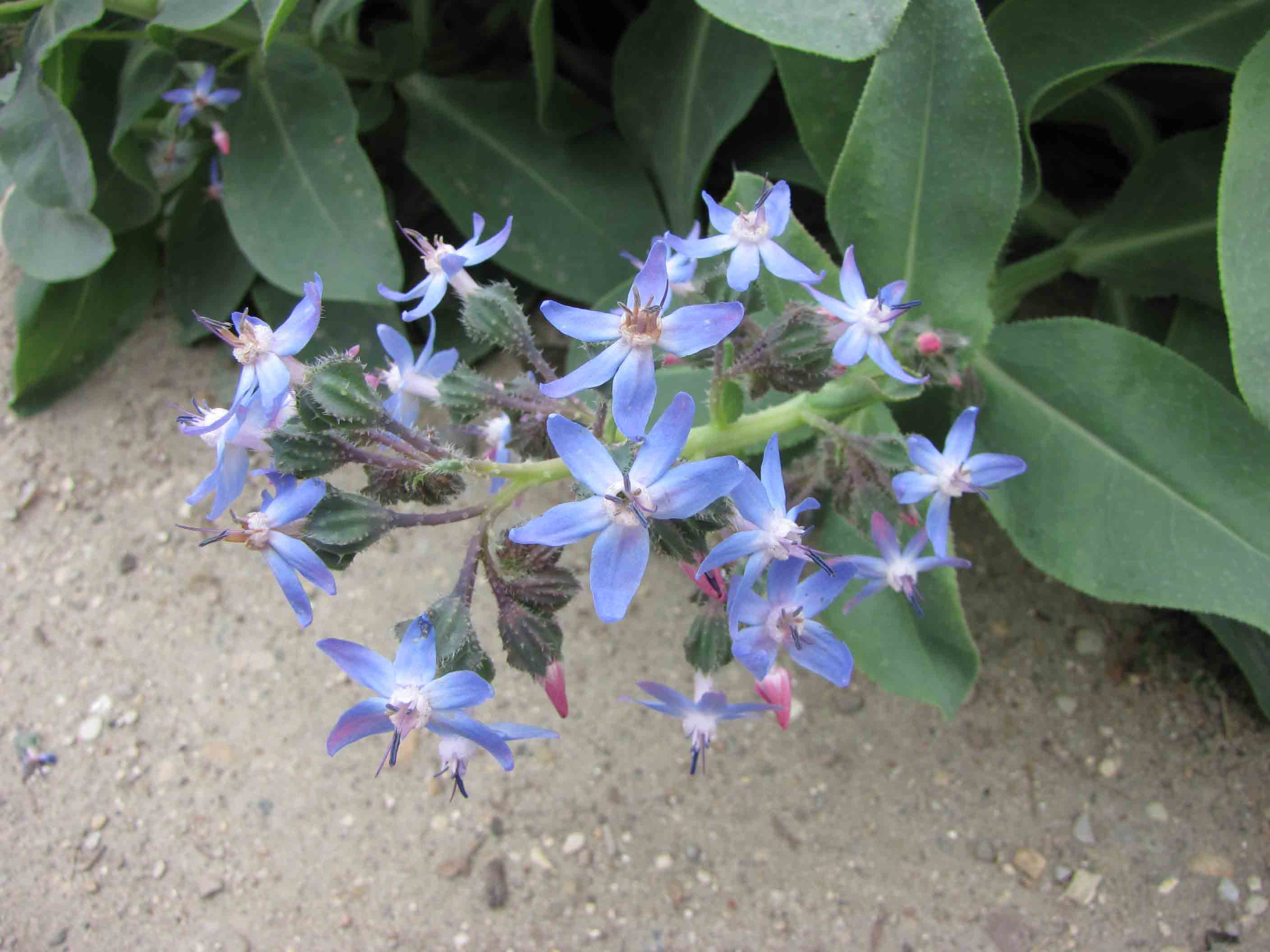
- Caccinia macranthera

Scientific classification
- Kingdom: Plantae
- Clade: Tracheophytes
- Clade: Angiosperms
- Clade: Eudicots
- Clade: Asterids
- Order: Boraginales
- Family: Boraginaceae
- Genus: Caccinia; Savi

Synonyms
- Anisanthera Raf. (1837)

= Caccinia =

Genus of flowering plants

Caccinia is a genus of flowering plants belonging to the family Boraginaceae.

Its native range is Caucasus to Himalaya.

== Species ==
Four species are accepted.

- Caccinia dubia Bunge
- Caccinia kotschyi Boiss.
- Caccinia macranthera (Banks & Sol.) Brand
- Caccinia strigosa Boiss.

=== Formerly placed here ===
- Heliocarya actinobole (Bunge) Ranjbar & Khalvati (as Caccinia actinobole Bunge)
