= Crucicaryum =

Scientific classification
- Kingdom: Plantae
- Clade: Tracheophytes
- Clade: Angiosperms
- Clade: Eudicots
- Clade: Asterids
- Order: Boraginales
- Family: Boraginaceae
- Genus: Crucicaryum; Brand
- Species: C. papuanum

Binomial name
- Crucicaryum papuanum O.Brand

Genus of flowering plants

Crucicaryum is a genus of flowering plants belonging to the family Boraginaceae. The only species is Crucicaryum papuanum.

Its native range is New Guinea.
