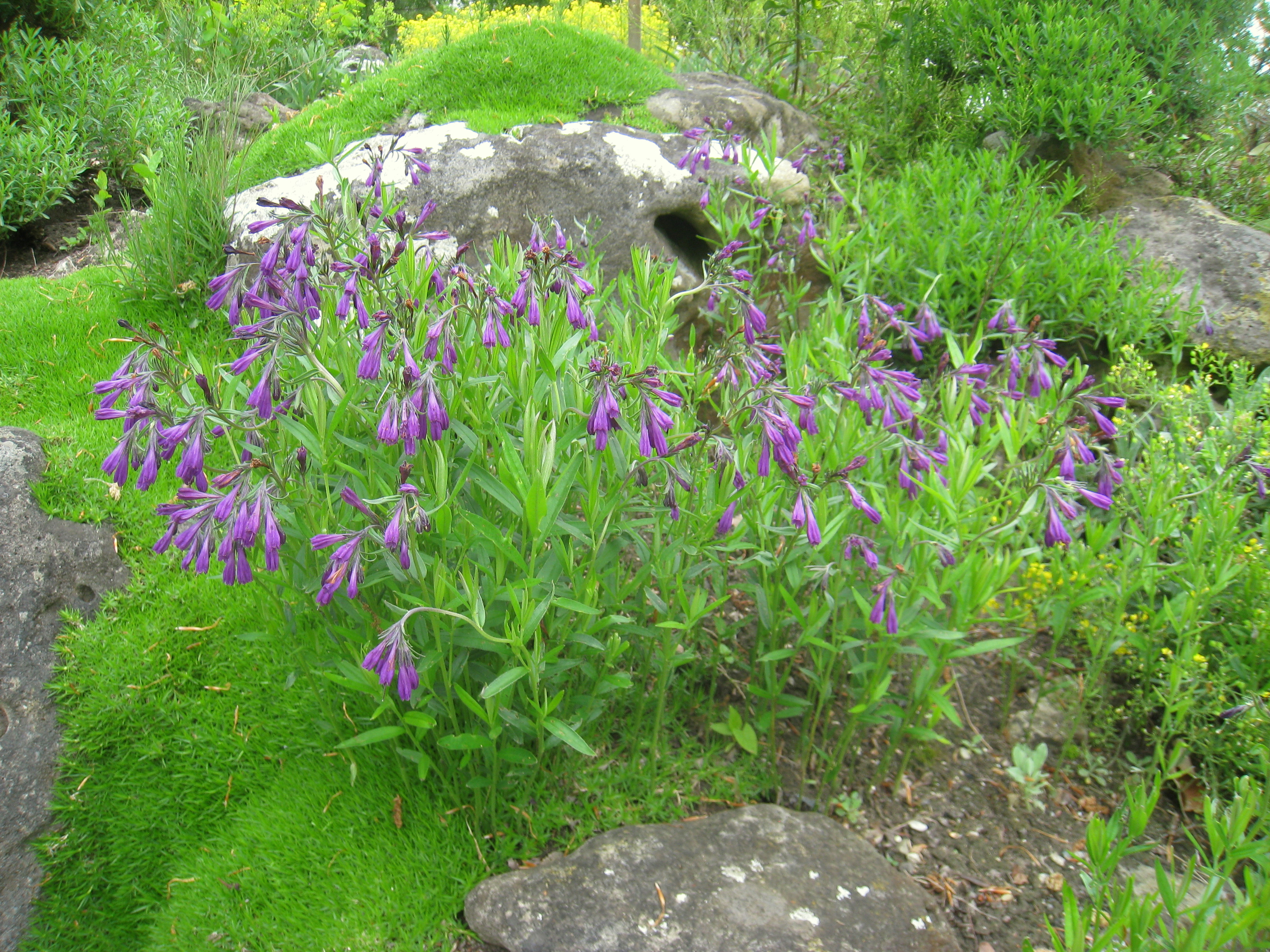

Scientific classification
- Kingdom: Plantae
- Clade: Tracheophytes
- Clade: Angiosperms
- Clade: Eudicots
- Clade: Asterids
- Order: Boraginales
- Family: Boraginaceae
- Genus: Paramoltkia; Greuter
- Species: P. doerfleri

Binomial name
- Paramoltkia doerfleri (Wettst.) Greuter & Burdet

= Paramoltkia =

Genus of plants

Paramoltkia is a genus of flowering plants belonging to the family Boraginaceae. The only species is Paramoltkia doerfleri.

Its native range is Western Balkan Peninsula.
