= Heliocarya =

Scientific classification
- Kingdom: Plantae
- Clade: Tracheophytes
- Clade: Angiosperms
- Clade: Eudicots
- Clade: Asterids
- Order: Boraginales
- Family: Boraginaceae
- Genus: Heliocarya; Bunge (1871)

Species
- Heliocarya actinobole (Bunge) Ranjbar & Khalvati; Heliocarya monandra Bunge

Genus of plants

Heliocarya is a genus of flowering plants belonging to the family Boraginaceae. It includes two species of perennials native to Iran.

- Heliocarya actinobole (Bunge) Ranjbar & Khalvati – central Iran
- Heliocarya monandra Bunge – central and south-central Iran
