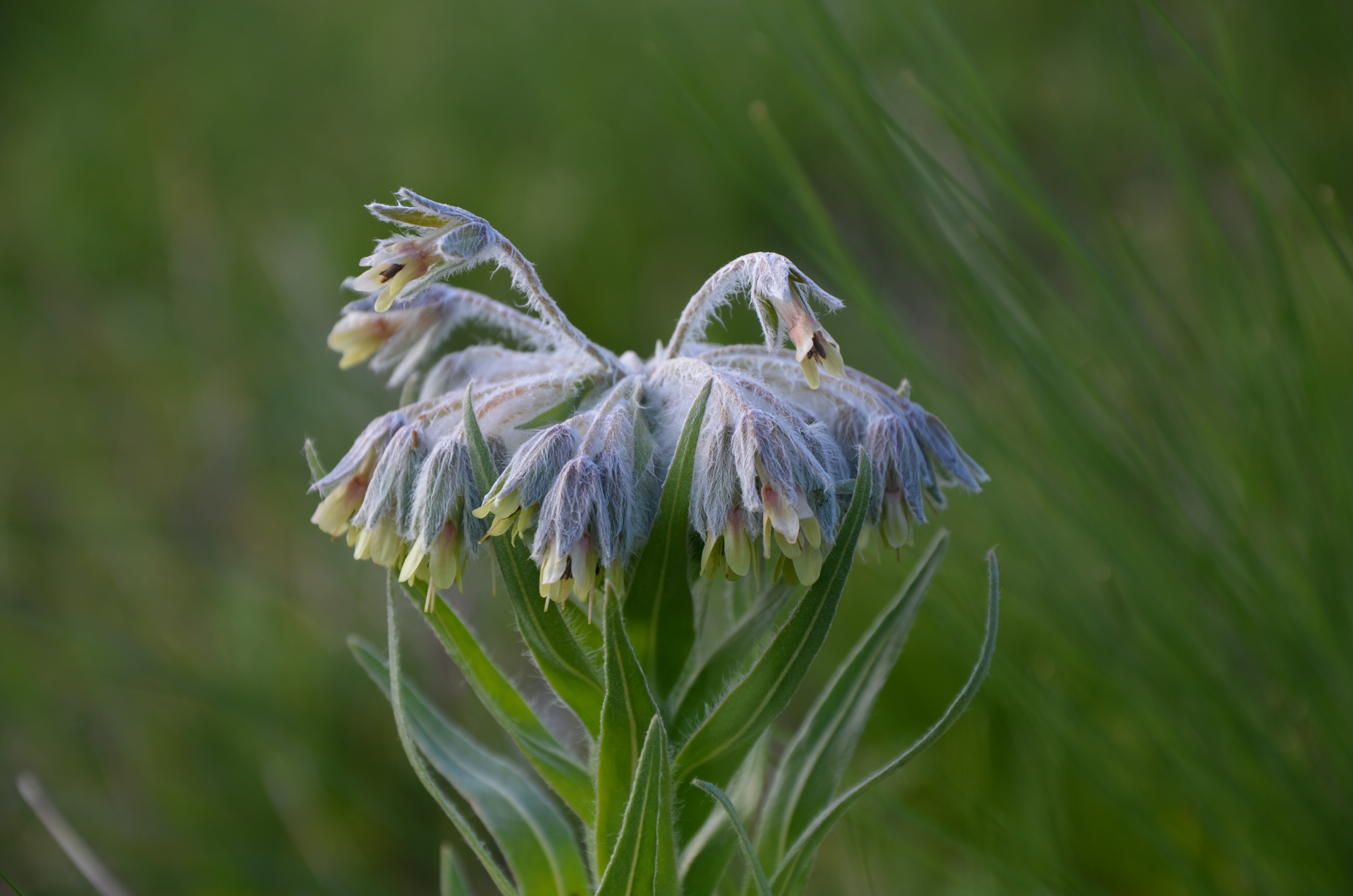
- Rindera umbellata

Scientific classification
- Kingdom: Plantae
- Clade: Embryophytes
- Clade: Tracheophytes
- Clade: Spermatophytes
- Clade: Angiosperms
- Clade: Eudicots
- Clade: Asterids
- Order: Boraginales
- Family: Boraginaceae
- Genus: Rindera; Pall.

Synonyms
- Bilegnum Brand; Cyphomattia Boiss.; Mattia Schult.

= Rindera =

Genus of flowering plants

Rindera is a genus of flowering plants belonging to the family Boraginaceae.

Its native range is north-western Africa (Algeria), south-eastern and eastern Europe (Greece, East European Russia, Romania, Ukraine and Yugoslavia) to western and central Asia (Afghanistan, Altay, Bulgaria, Iran, Iraq, Kazakhstan, Kyrgyzstan, Krasnoyarsk, Crimia, Lebanon-Syria, Mongolia, North Caucasus, South European Russia, Tajikistan, Transcaucasus, Turkey, Turkmenistan, Uzbekistan) and Xinjiang (China).

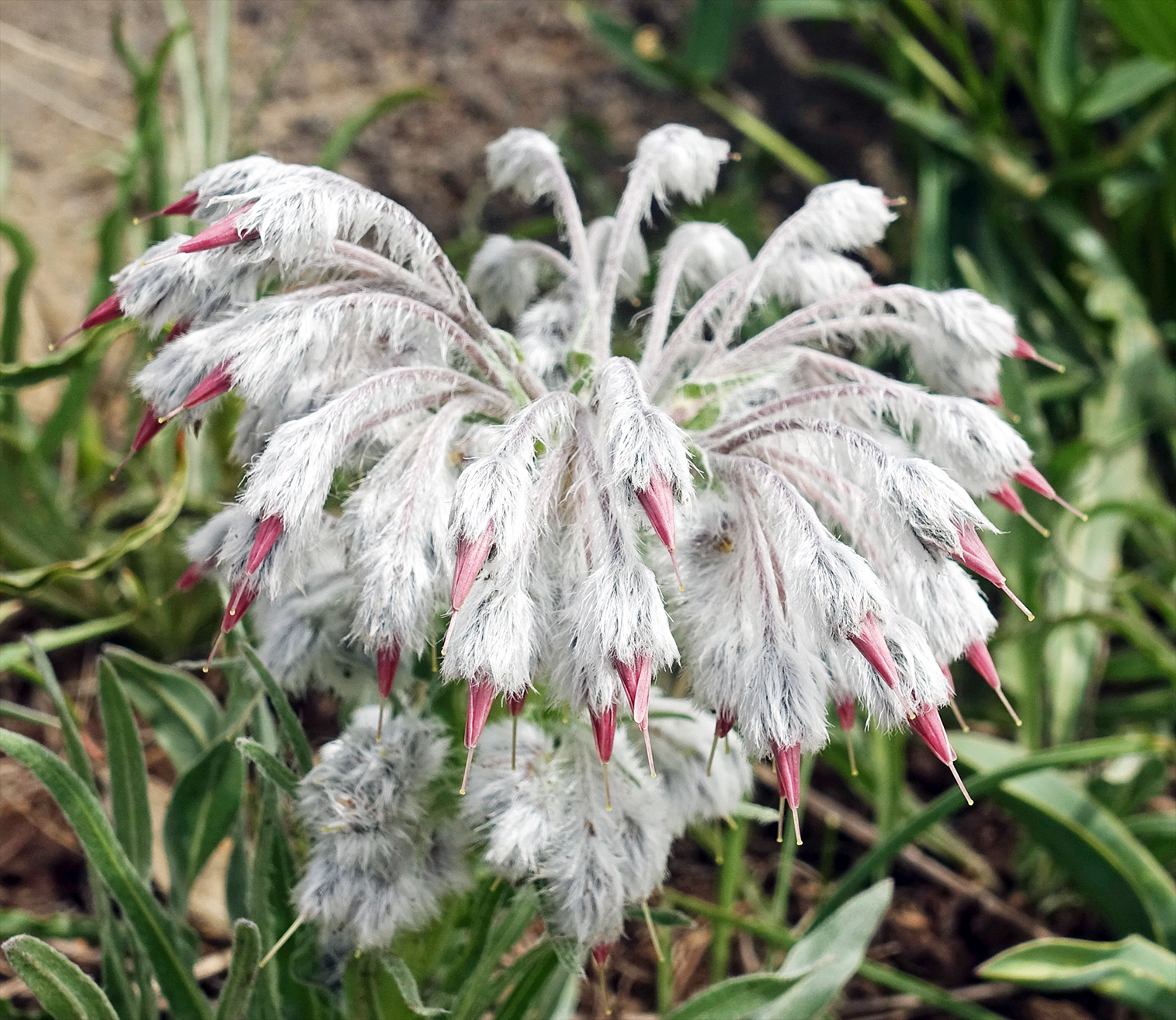
Rindera lanata

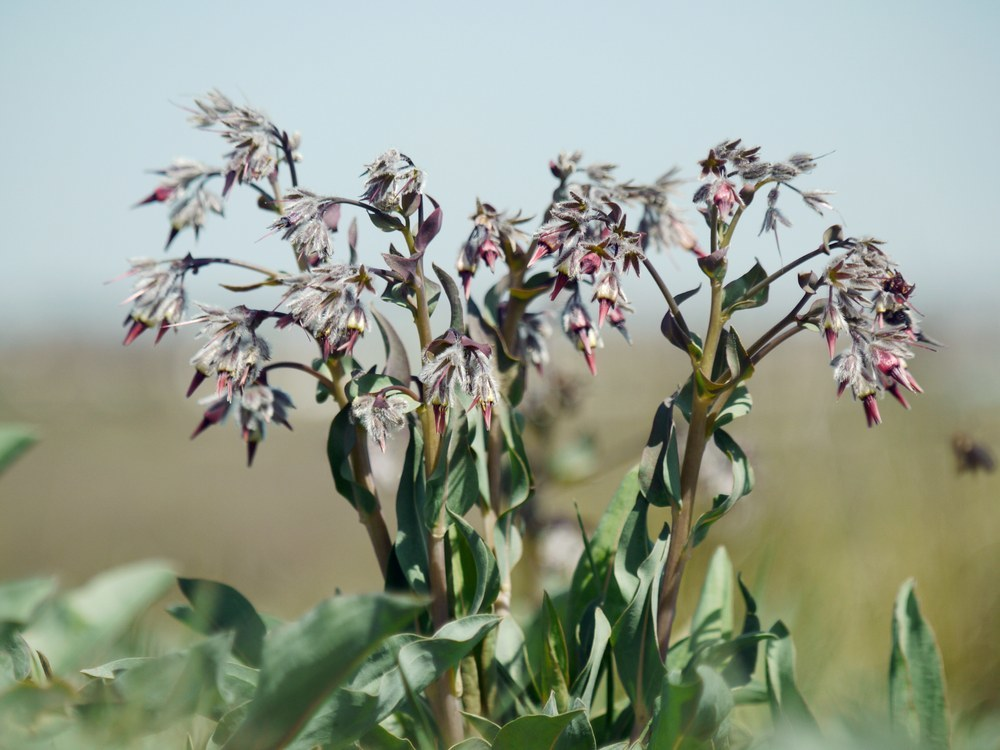
Rindera tetraspis

The genus name of Rindera is in honour of Franz Andreas Rinder (1714–1772), a German-born Russian doctor in Orenburg and Moscow who discovered this plant in the Ural Mountains. It was first described and published in Reise Russ. Reich. Vol1 on page 486 in 1771.

== Known species ==
According to Kew:

- Rindera alaica Lazkov
- Rindera albida (Wettst. ex Stapf) Kusn.
- Rindera austroechinata Popov
- Rindera bungei (Boiss.) Gürke
- Rindera caespitosa (DC.) Gürke
- Rindera cetineri Yildirim
- Rindera coechinata Popov
- Rindera cristulata Lipsky
- Rindera dumanii Aytaç & R.R.Mill
- Rindera echinata Regel
- Rindera ferganica Popov
- Rindera fornicata Pazij
- Rindera glabrata Pazij
- Rindera graeca (A.DC.) Boiss. & Heldr.
- Rindera gymnandra (Coss.) Gürke
- Rindera holochiton Popov
- Rindera korshinskyi (Lipsky) O.Fedtsch. & B.Fedtsch.
- Rindera kuhitangica Raenko
- Rindera kuramensis Turak.
- Rindera lanata (Lam.) Bunge
- Rindera media (Turrill) Parsa
- Rindera neubaueri (Rech.f.) Rech.f. & Riedl
- Rindera oblongifolia Popov
- Rindera ochroleuca Kar. & Kir.
- Rindera oschensis Popov
- Rindera regia (S.G.Gmel.) Kusn.
- Rindera schlumbergeri (Boiss.) Gürke
- Rindera tetraspis Pall.
- Rindera tianschanica Popov
- Rindera tschotkalensis Popov
- Rindera umbellata (Waldst. & Kit.) Gürke
