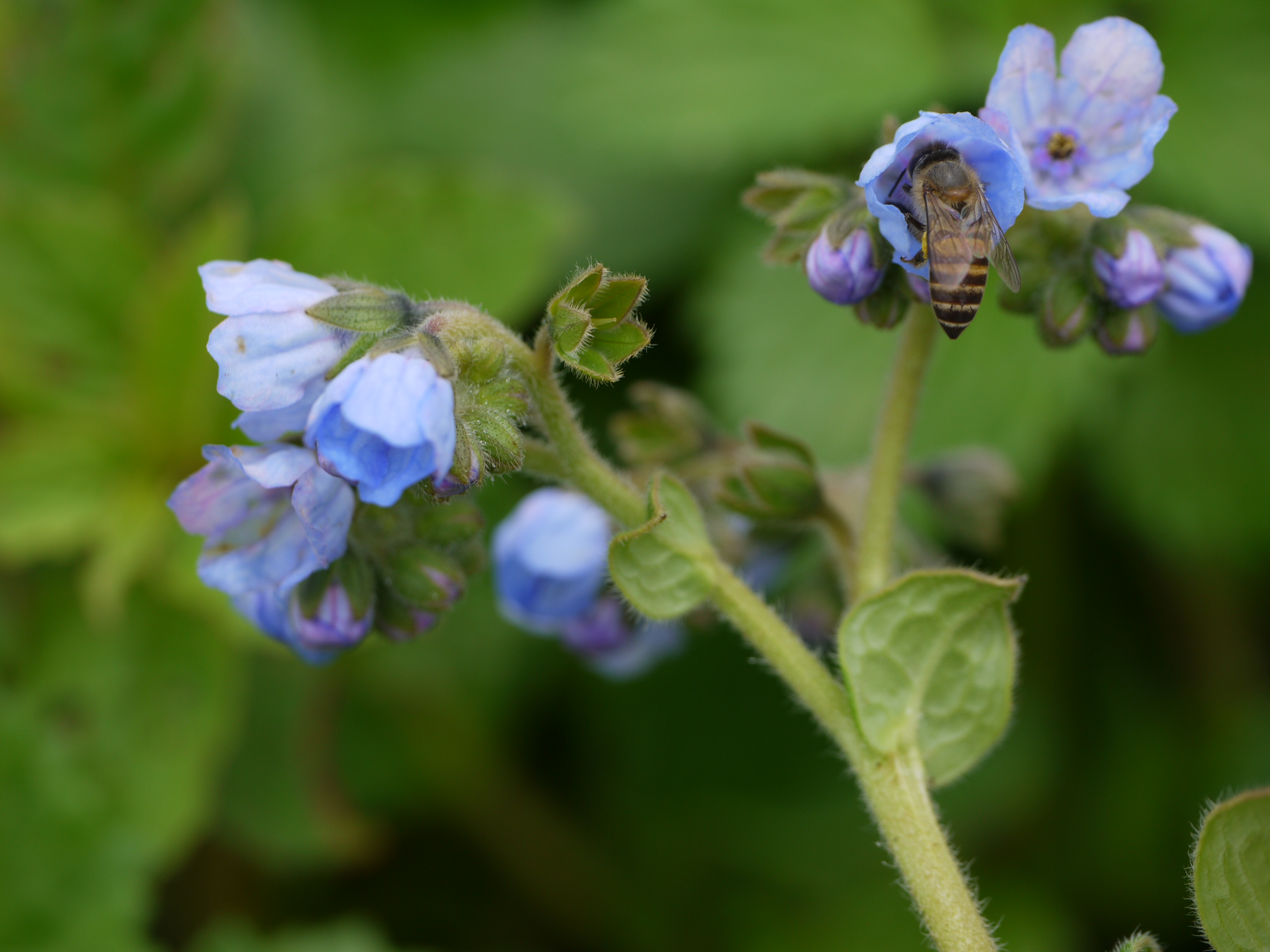
- Flowers attended by bee

Scientific classification
- Kingdom: Plantae
- Clade: Tracheophytes
- Clade: Angiosperms
- Clade: Eudicots
- Clade: Asterids
- Order: Boraginales
- Family: Boraginaceae
- Genus: Adelocaryum; Brand

Synonyms
- Paracaryopsis (Riedl) R.R.Mill

= Adelocaryum =

Genus of flowering plants

Adelocaryum is a genus of flowering plants belonging to the family Boraginaceae.

Its native range is southern Arabian Peninsula and the Indian subcontinent.

== Species ==
The following species are accepted:

- Adelocaryum coelestinum (Lindl.) Brand
- Adelocaryum flexuosum Brand
- Adelocaryum lambertianum (C.B.Clarke) R.R.Mill
- Adelocaryum malabaricum (C.B.Clarke) Brand
- Adelocaryum nebulicola R.R.Mill
