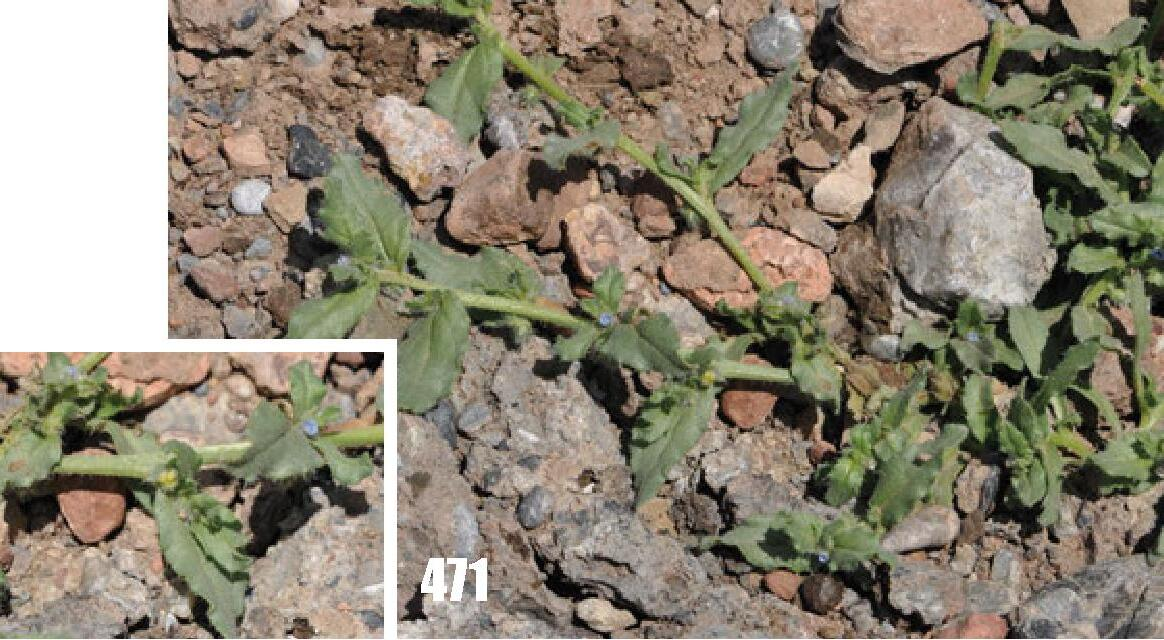
- Gastrocotyle hispida

Scientific classification
- Kingdom: Plantae
- Clade: Tracheophytes
- Clade: Angiosperms
- Clade: Eudicots
- Clade: Asterids
- Order: Boraginales
- Family: Boraginaceae
- Genus: Gastrocotyle; Bunge

= Gastrocotyle (plant) =

Genus of plants

Gastrocotyle is a genus of flowering plants belonging to the family Boraginaceae.

Its native range is Southeastern Europe to Northwestern India.

Species:

- Gastrocotyle hispida (Forssk.) Bunge
- Gastrocotyle macedonica (Degen & Dörfl.) Bigazzi, Hilger & Selvi
- Gastrocotyle natolica Brand
