= Sauria akkolia =

Scientific classification
- Kingdom: Plantae
- Clade: Tracheophytes
- Clade: Angiosperms
- Clade: Eudicots
- Clade: Asterids
- Order: Boraginales
- Family: Boraginaceae
- Genus: Sauria; Bajtenov (1995 publ. 1996)
- Species: S. akkolia

Binomial name
- Sauria akkolia Bajtenov (1995 publ. 1996)

Species of flowering plant

Sauria akkolia is a species of flowering plant in the family Boraginaceae. It is the sole species in genus Sauria. It is endemic to Kazakhstan where it grows in subalpine areas.
