= Amphibologyne =

Scientific classification
- Kingdom: Plantae
- Clade: Tracheophytes
- Clade: Angiosperms
- Clade: Eudicots
- Clade: Asterids
- Order: Boraginales
- Family: Boraginaceae
- Genus: Amphibologyne; Brand (1931)
- Species: A. mexicana

Binomial name
- Amphibologyne mexicana (M.Martens & Galeotti) Brand (1931)

Synonyms
- Amblynotopsis durangensis J.F.Macbr. (1916); Amsinckia mexicana M.Martens & Galeotti (1844); Benthamia mexicana (M.Martens & Galeotti) Druce (1916)

Genus of flowering plants

Amphibologyne mexicana is a species of flowering plant belonging to the family Boraginaceae. It is the sole species in genus Amphibologyne. It is an annual native to Texas and Mexico.
