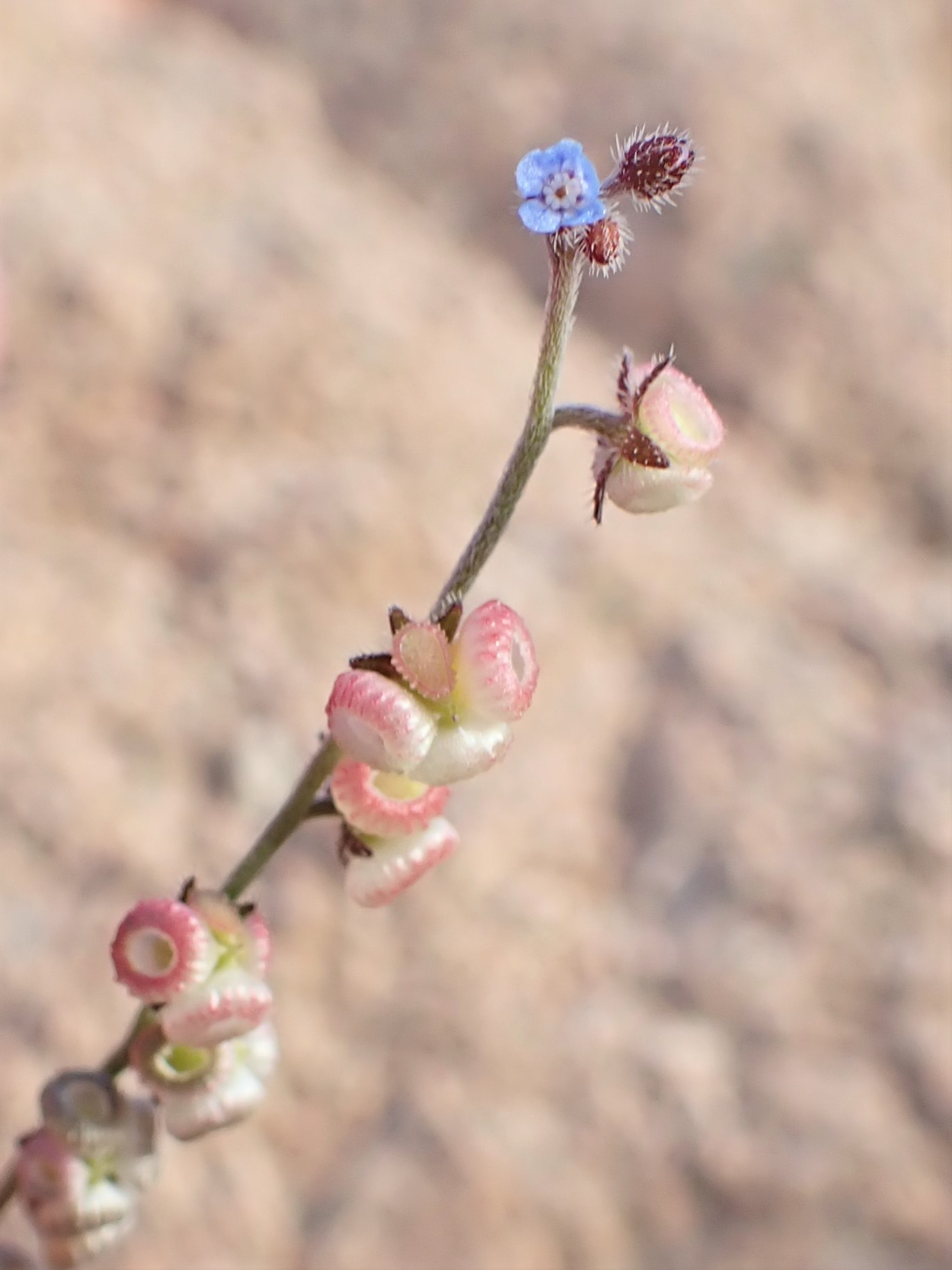
- Microparacaryum intermedium

Scientific classification
- Kingdom: Plantae
- Clade: Tracheophytes
- Clade: Angiosperms
- Clade: Eudicots
- Clade: Asterids
- Order: Boraginales
- Family: Boraginaceae
- Subfamily: Cynoglossoideae
- Subtribe: Cynoglossinae
- Genus: Microparacaryum (Popov ex Riedl) Hilger & Podlech (1985)

Species
- Microparacaryum bungei (Boiss.) Khat.; Microparacaryum intermedium (Fresen.) Hilger & Podlech; Microparacaryum longipedicellatum (Riedl) Sutorý; Microparacaryum salsum (Boiss.) Hilger & Podlech

= Microparacaryum =

Genus of flowering plants

Microparacaryum is a genus of flowering plants in the family Boraginaceae. It includes four species ranging from the eastern Mediterranean and Eritrea to the Arabian Peninsula, Iran, Central Asia, Afghanistan, Pakistan, and the western Himalayas.

== Species ==
Four species are accepted.

- Microparacaryum bungei (Boiss.) Khat. – Egypt, Iran, Afghanistan, Pakistan, and Central Asia
- Microparacaryum intermedium (Fresen.) Hilger & Podlech – Egypt, Israel, Jordan, Arabian Peninsula, Iran, Afghanistan, Pakistan, western Himalayas, and Central Asia
- Microparacaryum longipedicellatum (Riedl) Sutorý – Afghanistan and western Pakistan
- Microparacaryum salsum (Boiss.) Hilger & Podlech – north-central Iran
