= Antiotrema =

Scientific classification
- Kingdom: Plantae
- Clade: Tracheophytes
- Clade: Angiosperms
- Clade: Eudicots
- Clade: Asterids
- Order: Boraginales
- Family: Boraginaceae
- Genus: Antiotrema; Hand.-Mazz. (1920)
- Species: A. dunnianum

Binomial name
- Antiotrema dunnianum (Diels) Hand.-Mazz. (1920)

Synonyms
- Henryettana Brand (1929); Cynoglossum cavaleriei H.Lév. (1913); Cynoglossum dunnianum Diels (1912); Henryettana mirabilis Brand (1929)

Genus of flowering plants

Antiotrema dunnianum is a species of flowering plant belonging to the family Boraginaceae. It is the sole species in genus Antiotrema. It is a perennial native to southern China, ranging from southwestern Sichuan to western Guangxi.
