= Microcaryum =

Scientific classification
- Kingdom: Plantae
- Clade: Tracheophytes
- Clade: Angiosperms
- Clade: Eudicots
- Clade: Asterids
- Order: Boraginales
- Family: Boraginaceae
- Genus: Microcaryum; I.M.Johnst.
- Species: M. pygmaeum

Binomial name
- Microcaryum pygmaeum I.M.Johnst.

Genus of plants

Microcaryum is a monotypic genus of flowering plants belonging to the family Boraginaceae. The only species is Microcaryum pygmaeum.

Its native range is Nepal to China (Sichuan).
