= Thaumatocaryon =

Scientific classification
- Kingdom: Plantae
- Clade: Tracheophytes
- Clade: Angiosperms
- Clade: Eudicots
- Clade: Asterids
- Order: Boraginales
- Family: Boraginaceae
- Genus: Thaumatocaryon; Baill. (1890)

Genus of flowering plant

Thaumatocaryon is a genus of flowering plants belonging to the family Boraginaceae.

Its native range is southeastern and southern Brazil to northeastern Argentina.

Species:

- Thaumatocaryon dasyanthum (Cham.) I.M.Johnst.
- Thaumatocaryon tetraquetrum (Cham.) I.M.Johnst.
