= Chionocharis =

Scientific classification
- Kingdom: Plantae
- Clade: Tracheophytes
- Clade: Angiosperms
- Clade: Eudicots
- Clade: Asterids
- Order: Boraginales
- Family: Boraginaceae
- Genus: Chionocharis; I.M.Johnst.

Genus of flowering plants

Chionocharis is a genus of flowering plants belonging to the family Boraginaceae.

Its native range is Himalaya to China.

Species:

- Chionocharis hookeri (C.B.Clarke) I.M.Johnst.
