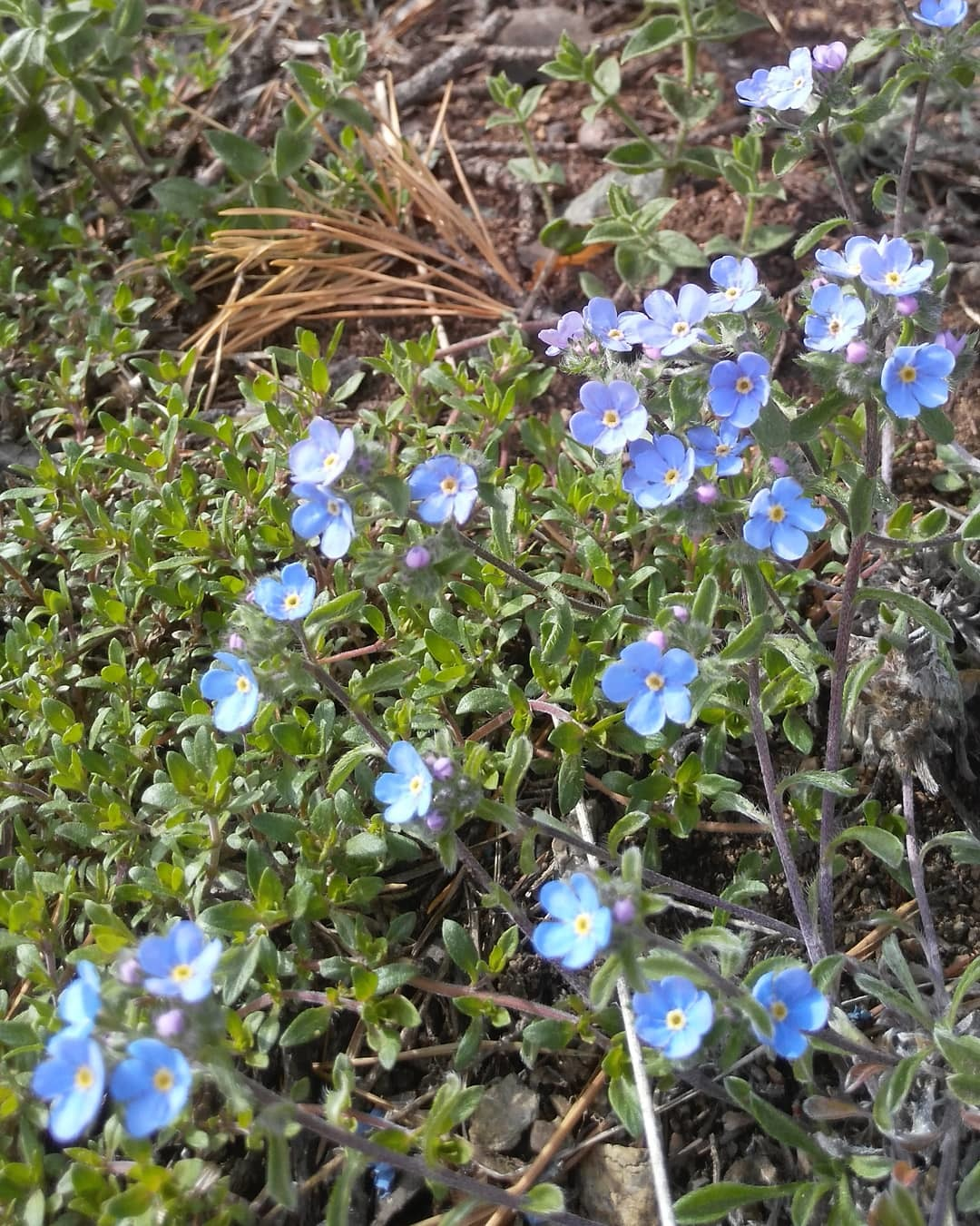

Scientific classification
- Kingdom: Plantae
- Clade: Tracheophytes
- Clade: Angiosperms
- Clade: Eudicots
- Clade: Asterids
- Order: Boraginales
- Family: Boraginaceae
- Genus: Amblynotus (A.DC.) I.M.Johnst. (1924)
- Species: A. rupestris

Binomial name
- Amblynotus rupestris (Georgi) Popov (1953)

Synonyms
- List: Amblynotus chinganicus A.I.Baranov & Skvortsov (1966); Amblynotus davuricus (Pall. ex Roem. & Schult.) I.M.Johnst. (1940); Amblynotus obovatus (Ledeb.) I.M.Johnst. (1924); Anchusa pauciflora Roem. & Schult. (1819); Anchusa rupestris (Georgi) Sweet (1818); Eritrichium dauuricum (Pall. ex Roem. & Schult.) Brand (1931); Eritrichium obovatum (Ledeb.) A.DC. (1846); Eritrichium rupestre (Georgi) Bunge (1836); Krynitzkia obovata A.Gray (1885); Myosotis davurica Pall. ex Roem. & Schult. (1819); Myosotis obovata Ledeb. (1829); Myosotis rupestris Georgi (1775)

= Amblynotus =

Genus of flowering plants

Amblynotus rupestris is a species of flowering plant belonging to the family Boraginaceae. It is the sole species in genus Amblynotus. It is a subshrub native to Kazakhstan, Xinjiang, Mongolia, southern Siberia, and northern China.
