= Anoplocaryum =

Scientific classification
- Kingdom: Plantae
- Clade: Tracheophytes
- Clade: Angiosperms
- Clade: Eudicots
- Clade: Asterids
- Order: Boraginales
- Family: Boraginaceae
- Genus: Anoplocaryum; Ledeb.

Genus of flowering plants

Anoplocaryum is a genus of flowering plants belonging to the family Boraginaceae.

Its native range is from Siberia to Mongolia and includes Northwestern Himalaya.

Species:

- Anoplocaryum compressum Ledeb.
- Anoplocaryum helenae Volot.
- Anoplocaryum tenellum A.L.Ebel & Rudaya
- Anoplocaryum turczaninowii Krasnob.
