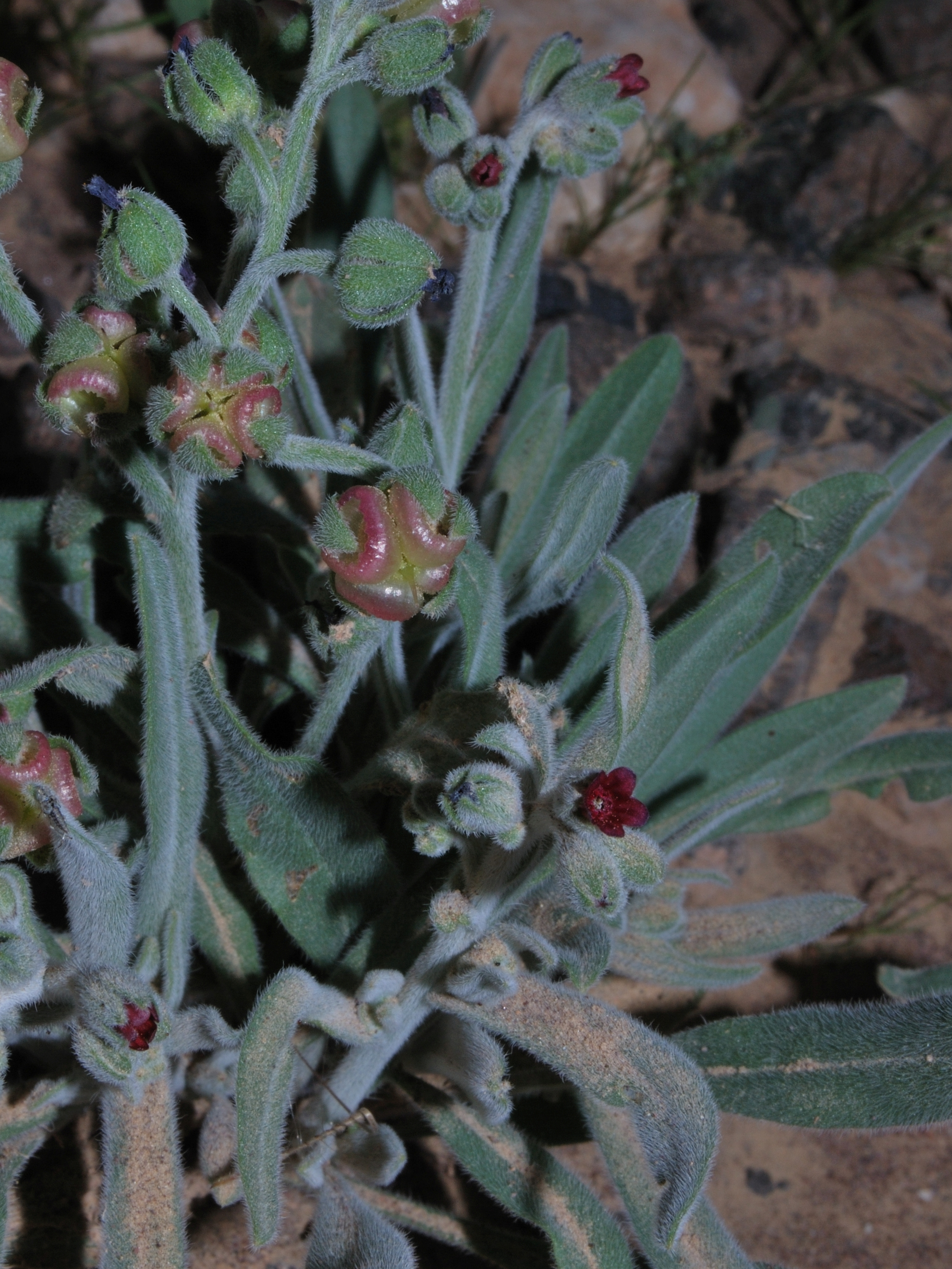
- Paracaryum rugulosum Boiss., Makhtesh Ramon, Israel, 2010.

Scientific classification
- Kingdom: Plantae
- Clade: Tracheophytes
- Clade: Angiosperms
- Clade: Eudicots
- Clade: Asterids
- Order: Boraginales
- Family: Boraginaceae
- Genus: Paracaryum; Boiss.

= Paracaryum =

Genus of plants

Paracaryum is a genus of flowering plants belonging to the family Boraginaceae.

Its native range is Egypt to Central Asia and Western Himalaya.

== Species ==
Species:

- Paracaryum bingoelianum Behçet & Ilçim
- Paracaryum calathicarpum (Stocks) Boiss.
- Paracaryum crista-galli (Rech.f. & Riedl) Kamelin & Raenko
- Paracaryum cyclhymenium (Boiss.) Riedl
- Paracaryum cynoglossoides (Rech.f. & Riedl) Khat.
- Paracaryum densum (Rech.f. & Riedl) D.Heller
- Paracaryum glandulosum Khat.
- Paracaryum glastifolium (Willd.) Boiss.
- Paracaryum gracile Czerniak.
- Paracaryum hedgei Aytaç & R.R.Mill
- Paracaryum heratense (Rech.f. & Riedl) Kamelin
- Paracaryum himalayense (Klotzsch) C.B.Clarke
- Paracaryum hirsutum (DC.) Boiss.
- Paracaryum integerrimum Myrz.
- Paracaryum khorassanicum Khat.
- Paracaryum lalezarense Doostm. & Mirtadz.
- Paracaryum leventshikii Yild.
- Paracaryum nigrum (Riedl) D.Heller
- Paracaryum persicum (Boiss.) Boiss.
- Paracaryum platycalyx Riedl
- Paracaryum polyanthum (Rech.f. & Riedl) Khat.
- Paracaryum ponticum (K.Koch) Boiss.
- Paracaryum pygmaeum (Rech.f.) D.Heller
- Paracaryum rugulosum (DC.) Boiss.
- Paracaryum sintenisii Hausskn. ex Bornm.
- Paracaryum strictum (K.Koch) Boiss.
- Paracaryum tenerum Bornm.
- Paracaryum thomsonii C.B.Clarke
- Paracaryum turcomanicum Bornm. & Sint.
