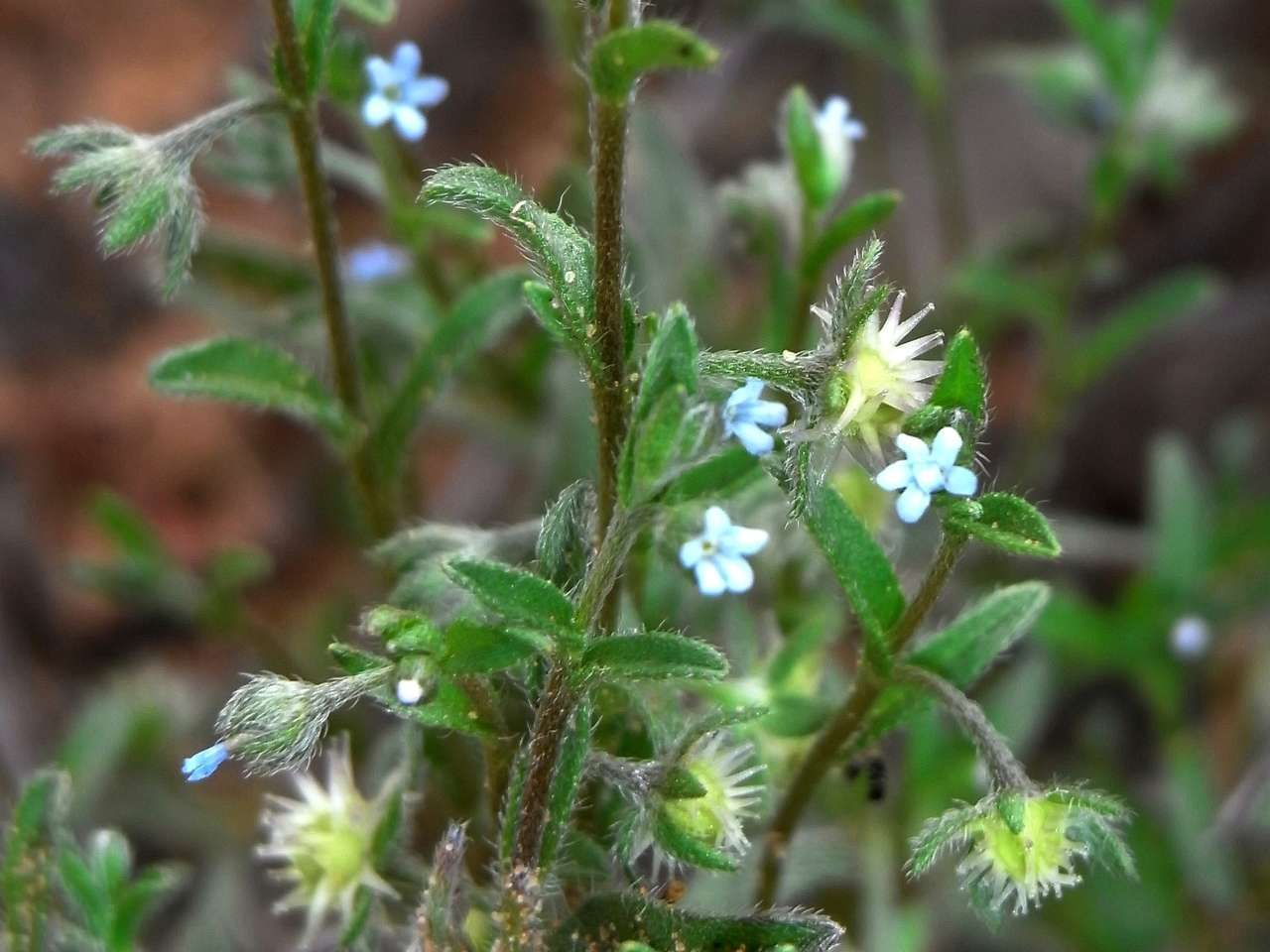

Scientific classification
- Kingdom: Plantae
- Clade: Tracheophytes
- Clade: Angiosperms
- Clade: Eudicots
- Clade: Asterids
- Order: Boraginales
- Family: Boraginaceae
- Genus: Omphalolappula; Brand
- Species: O. concava

Binomial name
- Omphalolappula concava (F.Muell.) Brand (1931)

Synonyms
- Cynoglossospermum concavum (F.Muell.) Kuntze (1891); Echinospermum concavum F.Muell. (1861); Lappula concava (F.Muell.) F.Muell. (1882)

= Omphalolappula =

Genus of plants

Omphalolappula is a genus of flowering plants belonging to the family Boraginaceae. It is monotypic, being represented by the single species Omphalolappula concava. Its native range is Australia.
