= Nogalia =

Scientific classification
- Kingdom: Plantae
- Clade: Tracheophytes
- Clade: Angiosperms
- Clade: Eudicots
- Clade: Asterids
- Order: Boraginales
- Family: Boraginaceae
- Genus: Nogalia; Verdc.
- Species: N. drepanophylla

Binomial name
- Nogalia drepanophylla (Baker) Verdc.

Synonyms
- Heliotropium drepanophyllum Baker (1894)

Genus of plants

Nogalia is a monotypic genus of flowering plants belonging to the family Boraginaceae. The only species is Nogalia drepanophylla.

Its native range is Sudan and Somalia in northeastern tropical Africa, and Yemen and Oman in the southern Arabian Peninsula.
