= Melanortocarya =

Scientific classification
- Kingdom: Plantae
- Clade: Tracheophytes
- Clade: Angiosperms
- Clade: Eudicots
- Clade: Asterids
- Order: Boraginales
- Family: Boraginaceae
- Genus: Melanortocarya; Selvi, Bigazzi, Hilger & Papini (2006)
- Species: M. obtusifolia

Binomial name
- Melanortocarya obtusifolia (Willd.) Selvi, Bigazzi, Hilger & Papini (2006)

Synonyms
- Anchusa leiosperma Bory (1833); Anchusa obtusifolia (Willd.) Caruel (1886); Anchusa rechingeri Riedl (1963); Echioides obtusifolia (Willd.) Poir. (1819); Lycopsis obtusifolia Willd. (1798); Nonea lamprocarpa Griseb. (1844); Nonea obtusifolia (Willd.) DC. (1805)

Genus of flowering plants

Melanortocarya obtusifolia is a species of flowering plant in the family Boraginaceae. It is the sole species in the genus Melanortocarya. It is an annual plant native to southeastern Europe and the eastern Mediterranean, ranging from Greece and Bulgaria through Turkey, Syria, and Lebanon to Israel.

The species was first described as Lycopsis obtusifolia by Carl Ludwig Willdenow in 1798. In 2006 it was moved to its genus Melanortocarya obtusifolia.
