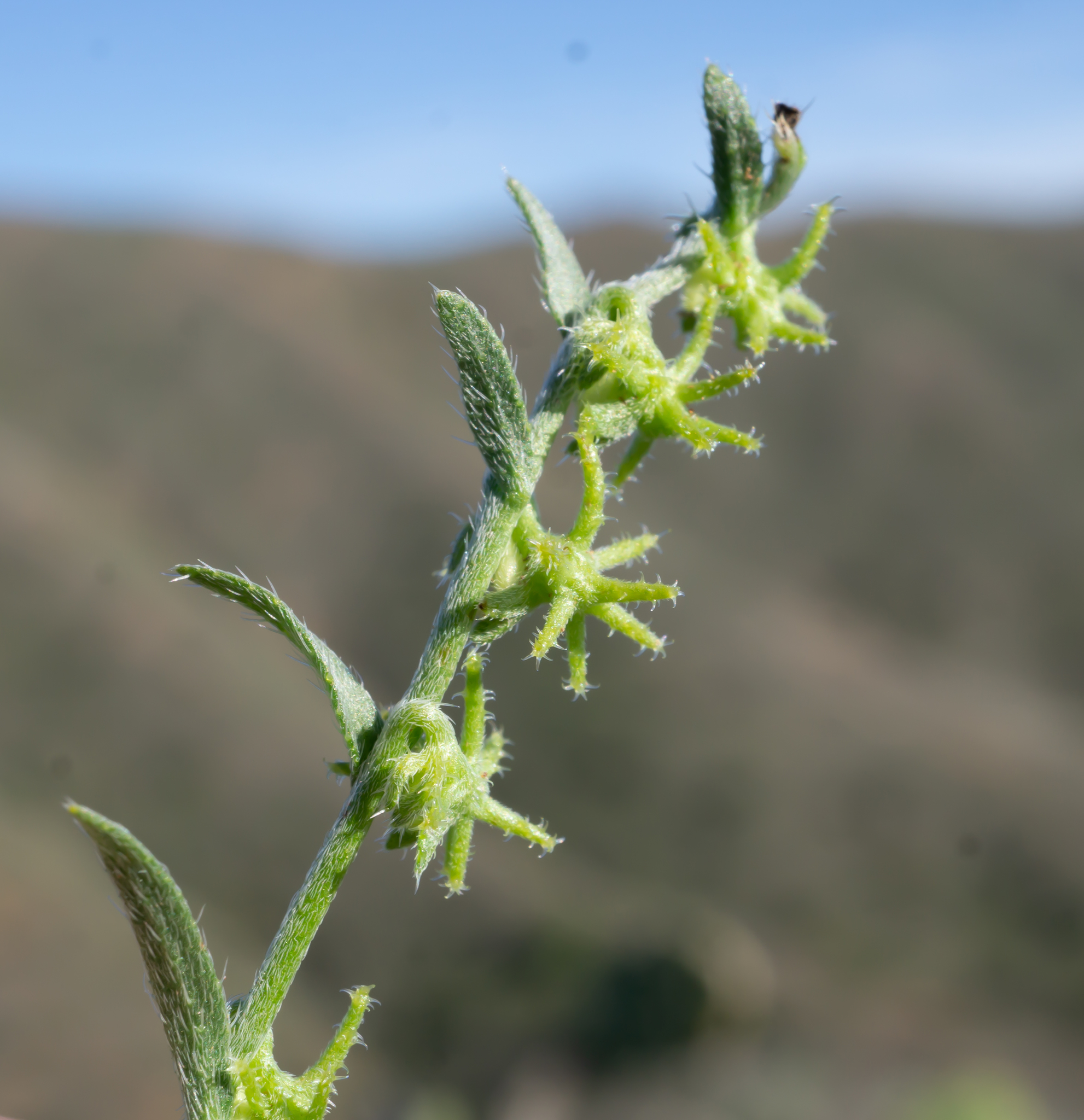
- The developing fruits of H. palmeri

Scientific classification
- Kingdom: Plantae
- Clade: Tracheophytes
- Clade: Angiosperms
- Clade: Eudicots
- Clade: Asterids
- Order: Boraginales
- Family: Boraginaceae
- Genus: Harpagonella; A.Gray (1876)

Species
- Harpagonella arizonica (I.M.Johnst.) Guilliams & B.G.Baldwin; Harpagonella palmeri A.Gray

= Harpagonella =

Genus of flowering plants

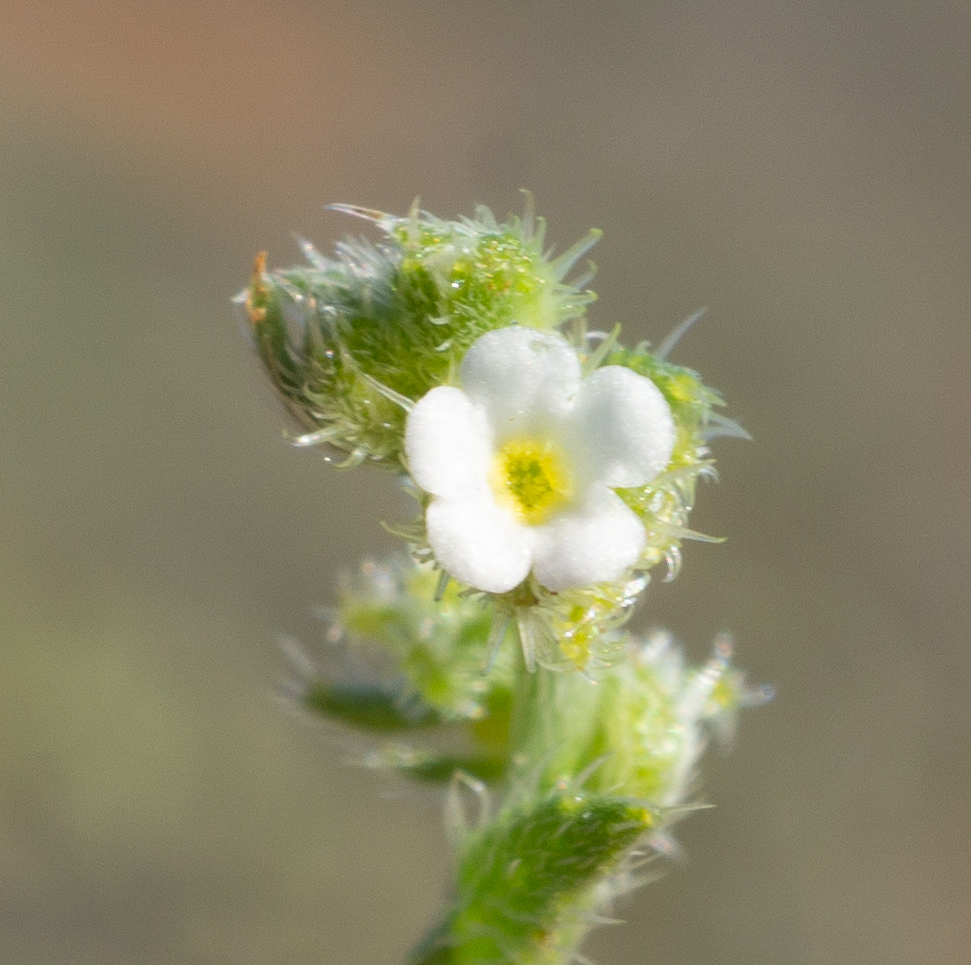
The flower

Harpagonella is a genus of flowering plants in the borage family. They are known as the grappling-hooks, because of the appearance and function of their fruits. The strange fruits are two small nutlets enclosed in a burlike calyx, which is armed with numerous spines covered in minute, hooked barbs. These diminutive, annual plants are found in sandy, clayey, and gravelly soils, and have small white flowers. This genus is native to North America, and is found in southern California, southern Arizona, northern Sonora, and the Baja California peninsula.

The genus has been regarded as one of the most morphologically distinctive of the Amsinckiinae, largely because of their unusual fruits. The genus was formerly monotypic, but the plants native to Arizona have since been recognized as a distinct species.

== Species ==
- Harpagonella arizonica (syn. H. palmeri var. arizonica) – Commonly known as the Arizona grappling-hook. Native to Arizona, northern Sonora, and southeastern Baja California. Type collected near Lowell, Arizona. Found on sandy or gravelly soils. Differs from H. palmeri in having significantly larger fruits.
- Harpagonella palmeri – Commonly known as Palmer's grappling-hook or stick-tight. Native to southern California, Baja California, and Baja California Sur. Type collected on Guadalupe Island, Baja California by Edward Palmer. Found on clayey soils.
