= Omphalotrigonotis =

Scientific classification
- Kingdom: Plantae
- Clade: Tracheophytes
- Clade: Angiosperms
- Clade: Eudicots
- Clade: Asterids
- Order: Boraginales
- Family: Boraginaceae
- Genus: Omphalotrigonotis; W.T.Wang

Genus of plants

Omphalotrigonotis is a genus of flowering plants belonging to the family Boraginaceae.

Its native range is southeastern China.

Species:

- Omphalotrigonotis cupulifera (I.M.Johnst.) W.T.Wang
- Omphalotrigonotis taishunensis Shao Z.Yang, W.W.Pan & J.P.Zhong
- Omphalotrigonotis vaginata Y.Y.Fang
