= Lasiocaryum =

Scientific classification
- Kingdom: Plantae
- Clade: Tracheophytes
- Clade: Angiosperms
- Clade: Eudicots
- Clade: Asterids
- Order: Boraginales
- Family: Boraginaceae
- Genus: Lasiocaryum; I.M.Johnst. (1925)

Synonyms
- Oreogenia I.M.Johnst. (1924), non Orogenia S.Watson (1871).; Setulocarya R.R.Mill & D.G.Long (1996)

Genus of plants

Lasiocaryum is a genus of flowering plants belonging to the family Boraginaceae.

Its native range is Himalaya to Southern Central China.

Species:

- Lasiocaryum densiflorum (Duthie) I.M.Johnst.
- Lasiocaryum munroi (C.B.Clarke) I.M.Johnst.
- Lasiocaryum trichocarpum (Hand.-Mazz.) I.M.Johnst.
