= Maharanga =

Scientific classification
- Kingdom: Plantae
- Clade: Tracheophytes
- Clade: Angiosperms
- Clade: Eudicots
- Clade: Asterids
- Order: Boraginales
- Family: Boraginaceae
- Genus: Maharanga; DC. (1846)

Species
- 43; see text

Genus of plants

Maharanga is a genus of flowering plants belonging to the family Boraginaceae.

It includes 43 species which range from northern Iraq through the Himalaya to central China and northern Thailand.

== Species ==
43 species are accepted.

- Maharanga adenopus (I.M.Johnst.) L.Cecchi & Hilger
- Maharanga alba (W.W.Sm. & Jeffrey) L.Cecchi & Hilger
- Maharanga bheriensis (H.Hara) L.Cecchi & Hilger
- Maharanga bhutanica I.M.Johnst.
- Maharanga bicolor (Wall. ex G.Don) DC.
- Maharanga borii (C.E.C.Fisch.) I.M.Johnst.
- Maharanga bracteata (Wall.) L.Cecchi & Hilger
- Maharanga burmanica (Collett & Hemsl.) L.Cecchi & Hilger
- Maharanga cingulata (W.W.Sm. & Jeffrey) L.Cecchi & Hilger
- Maharanga conferta (W.W.Sm.) L.Cecchi & Hilger
- Maharanga decasticha (Y.L.Liu) L.Cecchi & Hilger
- Maharanga dumetorum (I.M.Johnst.) I.M.Johnst.
- Maharanga egregia (I.M.Johnst.) I.M.Johnst.
- Maharanga emodi (Wall.) DC.
- Maharanga exserta (Hemsl.) L.Cecchi & Hilger
- Maharanga fistulosa (I.M.Johnst.) L.Cecchi & Hilger
- Maharanga glomerata (Y.L.Liu) L.Cecchi & Hilger
- Maharanga griersonii (R.R.Mill) L.Cecchi & Hilger
- Maharanga hookeri (C.B.Clarke) L.Cecchi & Hilger
- Maharanga hypoleuca (I.M.Johnst.) L.Cecchi & Hilger
- Maharanga incanescens (DC.) L.Cecchi & Hilger
- Maharanga intricata (Riedl & Freitag) L.Cecchi & Hilger
- Maharanga lhokaensis (Y.He & Q.R.Liu) L.Cecchi & Hilger
- Maharanga limitanea (I.M.Johnst.) L.Cecchi & Hilger
- Maharanga luquanensis (Y.L.Liu) L.Cecchi & Hilger
- Maharanga lycopsioides (C.E.C.Fisch.) I.M.Johnst.
- Maharanga maaikangensis (W.T.Wang) L.Cecchi & Hilger
- Maharanga microstoma (I.M.Johnst.) I.M.Johnst.
- Maharanga multiramosa (Hand.-Mazz.) L.Cecchi & Hilger
- Maharanga nangqenensis (Y.L.Liu) L.Cecchi & Hilger
- Maharanga paniculata (Bureau & Franch.) L.Cecchi & Hilger
- Maharanga platyphylla (Riedl) L.Cecchi & Hilger
- Maharanga pyramidalis (Hook.f.) L.Cecchi & Hilger
- Maharanga sinica (Diels) L.Cecchi & Hilger
- Maharanga squamulifera Riedl
- Maharanga stenosiphon (Boiss.) L.Cecchi & Hilger
- Maharanga thomsonii (C.B.Clarke) L.Cecchi & Hilger
- Maharanga verruculosa (I.M.Johnst.) I.M.Johnst.
- Maharanga vestita (Wall. ex G.Don) L.Cecchi & Hilger
- Maharanga waddellii (Duthie) L.Cecchi & Hilger
- Maharanga waltonii (Duthie) L.Cecchi & Hilger
- Maharanga wardii (W.W.Sm.) L.Cecchi & Hilger
- Maharanga yajiangensis (W.T.Wang) L.Cecchi & Hilger
