= Antiphytum =

Scientific classification
- Kingdom: Plantae
- Clade: Tracheophytes
- Clade: Angiosperms
- Clade: Eudicots
- Clade: Asterids
- Order: Boraginales
- Family: Boraginaceae
- Genus: Antiphytum; DC. ex Meisn.

Genus of flowering plants

Antiphytum, commonly known as saucerflower, is a genus of flowering plants belonging to the family Boraginaceae.

Its native range is Texas to Mexico and from Brazil to Uruguay.

Species:

- Antiphytum bornmuelleri Pilg.
- Antiphytum caespitosum I.M.Johnst.
- Antiphytum charruasorum Mendoza-Diaz et al
- Antiphytum ehrenbergii (Brand) Govaerts
- Antiphytum floribundum (Torr.) A.Gray - Texas saucerflower
- Antiphytum geoffreyi N.Mend. & Flores Olv.
- Antiphytum heliotropioides A.DC. - Mexican saucerflower
- Antiphytum hintoniorum L.C.Higgins & B.L.Turner
- Antiphytum humilis (Brand) Govaerts
- Antiphytum nudicalces I.M.Johnst.
- Antiphytum paniculatum I.M.Johnst.
- Antiphytum parryi S.Watson
- Antiphytum peninsulare (Rose) I.M.Johnst.
- Antiphytum stoechadifolium (Cham.) A.DC.
