= Brachybotrys =

Scientific classification
- Kingdom: Plantae
- Clade: Tracheophytes
- Clade: Angiosperms
- Clade: Eudicots
- Clade: Asterids
- Order: Boraginales
- Family: Boraginaceae
- Genus: Brachybotrys; Maxim. ex Oliv.
- Species: B. paridiformis

Binomial name
- Brachybotrys paridiformis Maxim. ex Oliv.

Genus of flowering plants

Brachybotrys is a monotypic genus of flowering plants belonging to the family Boraginaceae. Its only species is Brachybotrys paridiformis.

Its native range includes Primorye, Manchuria, and Korea.
