= Cystostemon =

Scientific classification
- Kingdom: Plantae
- Clade: Tracheophytes
- Clade: Angiosperms
- Clade: Eudicots
- Clade: Asterids
- Order: Boraginales
- Family: Boraginaceae
- Genus: Cystostemon; Balf.f.

Genus of flowering plants

Cystostemon is a genus of flowering plants belonging to the family Boraginaceae.

Its native range is Tropical Africa to Arabian Peninsula.

Species:

- Cystostemon barbatus (Vaupel) A.G.Mill. & Riedl
- Cystostemon ethiopicus A.G.Mill. & Riedl
- Cystostemon heliocharis (S.Moore) A.G.Mill. & Riedl
- Cystostemon hispidissimus (S.Moore) A.G.Mill. & Riedl
- Cystostemon hispidus (Baker & C.H.Wright) A.G.Mill. & Riedl
- Cystostemon intricatus A.G.Mill. & Riedl
- Cystostemon kissenioides (Deflers) A.G.Mill. & Riedl
- Cystostemon linearifolius E.S.Martins
- Cystostemon loveridgei E.S.Martins
- Cystostemon macranthera (Gürke) A.G.Mill. & Riedl
- Cystostemon mechowii (Vaupel) A.G.Mill. & Riedl
- Cystostemon medusa (Baker) A.G.Mill. & Riedl
- Cystostemon mwinilungensis E.S.Martins
- Cystostemon socotranus Balf.f.
- Cystostemon somaliensis A.G.Mill. & Riedl
- Cystostemon virescens A.G.Mill. & Riedl
