= Thyrocarpus =

Scientific classification
- Kingdom: Plantae
- Clade: Tracheophytes
- Clade: Angiosperms
- Clade: Eudicots
- Clade: Asterids
- Order: Boraginales
- Family: Boraginaceae
- Genus: Thyrocarpus; Hance (1862)

Genus of flowering plants

Thyrocarpus is a genus of flowering plants belonging to the family Boraginaceae.

Its native range is Central China to Vietnam, Korea, Taiwan.

Four species are accepted:

- Thyrocarpus cuifengensis S.S.Ying
- Thyrocarpus fujianensis Liang Ma, Xin Y.Chen & S.P.Chen
- Thyrocarpus glochidiatus Maxim.
- Thyrocarpus sampsonii Hance
