= Ogastemma =

Scientific classification
- Kingdom: Plantae
- Clade: Tracheophytes
- Clade: Angiosperms
- Clade: Eudicots
- Clade: Asterids
- Order: Boraginales
- Family: Boraginaceae
- Genus: Ogastemma; Brummitt
- Species: O. pusillum

Binomial name
- Ogastemma pusillum (Coss. & Durieu ex Bonnet & Barratte) Brummitt

Genus of plants

Ogastemma is a monotypic genus of flowering plants belonging to the family Boraginaceae. The only species is Ogastemma pusillum.

Its native range is Canary Islands, Southern and Eastern Mediterranean to Mauritania, Arabian Peninsula.
