= Decalepidanthus =

Scientific classification
- Kingdom: Plantae
- Clade: Tracheophytes
- Clade: Angiosperms
- Clade: Eudicots
- Clade: Asterids
- Order: Boraginales
- Family: Boraginaceae
- Genus: Decalepidanthus; Riedl (1963)

Synonyms
- Oreocharis (Decne.) Lindl. (1846), nom. rej.; Pseudomertensia Riedl (1967); Scapicephalus Ovcz. & Czukav. (1974)

Genus of plants

Decalepidanthus is a genus of flowering plants belonging to the family Boraginaceae.

Its native range is Afghanistan to Central Asia and Nepal.

Species:

- Decalepidanthus echioides (Royle ex Benth.) Dickoré & Hilger
- Decalepidanthus elongatus (Decne.) Dickoré & Hilger
- Decalepidanthus flavescens (Rafiq) Dickoré & Hilger
- Decalepidanthus moltkioides (Benth.) Dickoré & Hilger
- Decalepidanthus parviflorus (Decne.) Dickoré & Hilger
- Decalepidanthus primuloides (Decne.) Dickoré & Hilger
- Decalepidanthus racemosus (Royle ex Benth.) Dickoré & Hilger
- Decalepidanthus rosulatus (Ovcz. & Czukav.) Dickoré & Hilger
- Decalepidanthus trollii (Melch.) Dickoré & Hilger
