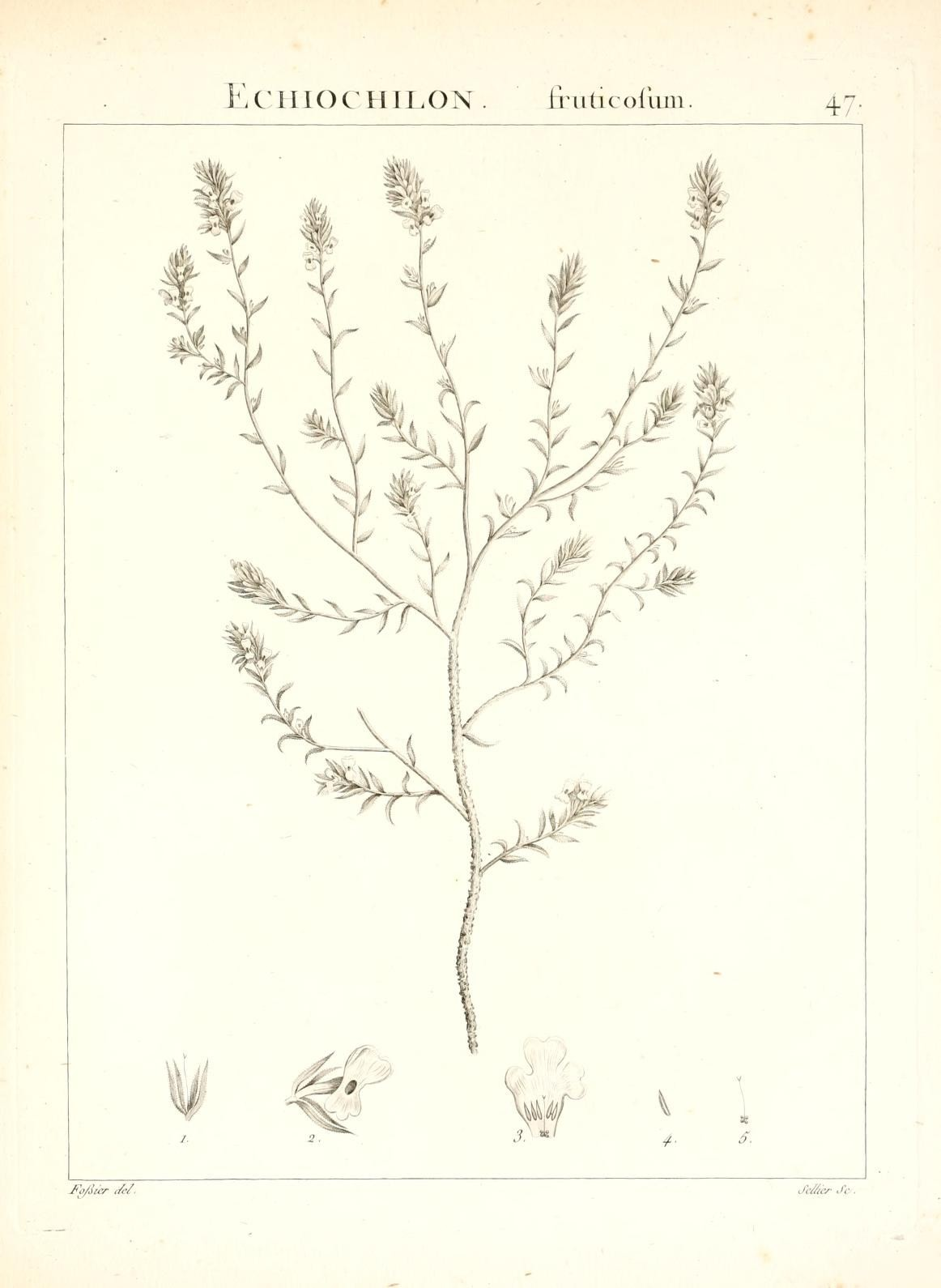

Scientific classification
- Kingdom: Plantae
- Clade: Tracheophytes
- Clade: Angiosperms
- Clade: Eudicots
- Clade: Asterids
- Order: Boraginales
- Family: Boraginaceae
- Genus: Echiochilon; Desf. (1798)

Synonyms
- Chilochium Raf. (1821); Echiochilopsis Caball. (1935); Leurocline S.Moore (1901); Sericostoma Stocks (1848); Tetraedrocarpus O.Schwartz (1939)

= Echiochilon =

Genus of flowering plants

Echiochilon is a genus of flowering plants belonging to the family Boraginaceae.

Its native range is Northern Africa to Kenya and Southern Pakistan.

== Species ==
16 species are accepted.

- Echiochilon arabicum (O.Schwartz) I.M.Johnst.
- Echiochilon arenarium (I.M.Johnst.) I.M.Johnst.
- Echiochilon baricum Lönn
- Echiochilon callianthum Lönn
- Echiochilon chazaliei (H.Boissieu) I.M.Johnst.
- Echiochilon collenettei I.M.Johnst.
- Echiochilon cyananthum Lönn
- Echiochilon fruticosum Desf.
- Echiochilon jugatum I.M.Johnst.
- Echiochilon kotschyi (Boiss. & Hohen.) I.M.Johnst.
- Echiochilon lithospermoides (S.Moore) I.M.Johnst.
- Echiochilon longiflorum Benth.
- Echiochilon pauciflorum (Stocks ex Wight) Långström & M.W.Chase
- Echiochilon persicum (Burm.f.) I.M.Johnst.
- Echiochilon pulvinatum A.G.Mill. & L.Urb.
- Echiochilon simonneaui Faurel & Dubuis
