= Stenosolenium =

Scientific classification
- Kingdom: Plantae
- Clade: Tracheophytes
- Clade: Angiosperms
- Clade: Eudicots
- Clade: Asterids
- Order: Boraginales
- Family: Boraginaceae
- Genus: Stenosolenium; Turcz.
- Species: S. saxatile

Binomial name
- Stenosolenium saxatile (Pall.) Turcz.

Genus of plants

Stenosolenium is a monotypic genus of flowering plants belonging to the family Boraginaceae. The only species is Stenosolenium saxatile.

Its native range is Southern Siberia to Mongolia.
