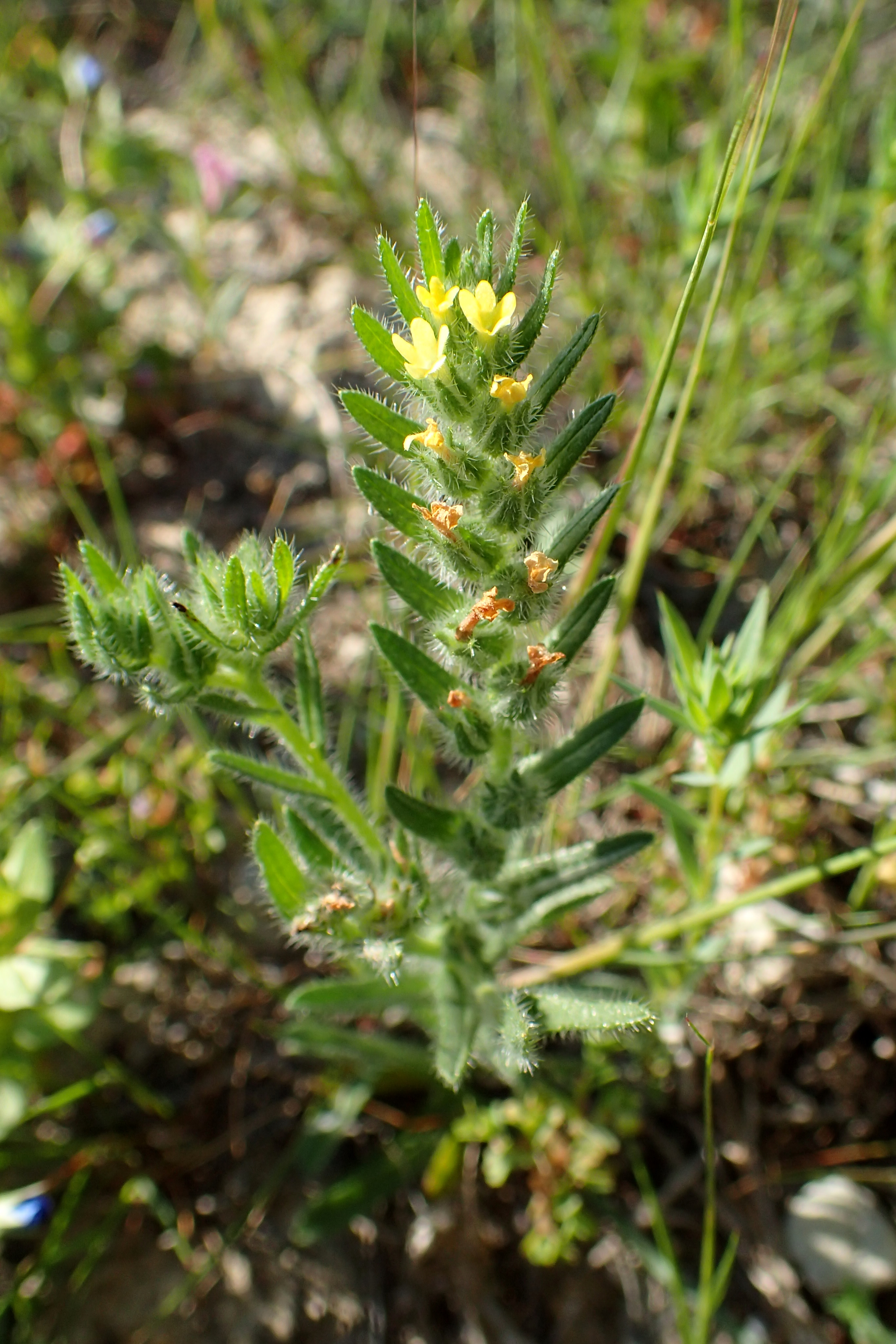
- Neatostema apulum

Scientific classification
- Kingdom: Plantae
- Clade: Tracheophytes
- Clade: Angiosperms
- Clade: Eudicots
- Clade: Asterids
- Order: Boraginales
- Family: Boraginaceae
- Genus: Neatostema; I.M.Johnst.
- Species: N. apulum

Binomial name
- Neatostema apulum (L.) I.M.Johnst.

= Neatostema =

Genus of plants

Neatostema is a monotypic genus of flowering plants belonging to the family Boraginaceae. The only species is Neatostema apulum.

Its native range is Canary Islands, Mediterranean to Northern Arabian Peninsula.
