= Embadium =

Scientific classification
- Kingdom: Plantae
- Clade: Tracheophytes
- Clade: Angiosperms
- Clade: Eudicots
- Clade: Asterids
- Order: Boraginales
- Family: Boraginaceae
- Genus: Embadium; J.M.Black

Genus of plants

Embadium is a genus of flowering plants belonging to the family Boraginaceae.

Its native range is Central and Southern Australia.

Species:

- Embadium jobnstonii Ising
- Embadium stagnense J.M.Black
- Embadium uncinatum Ising
