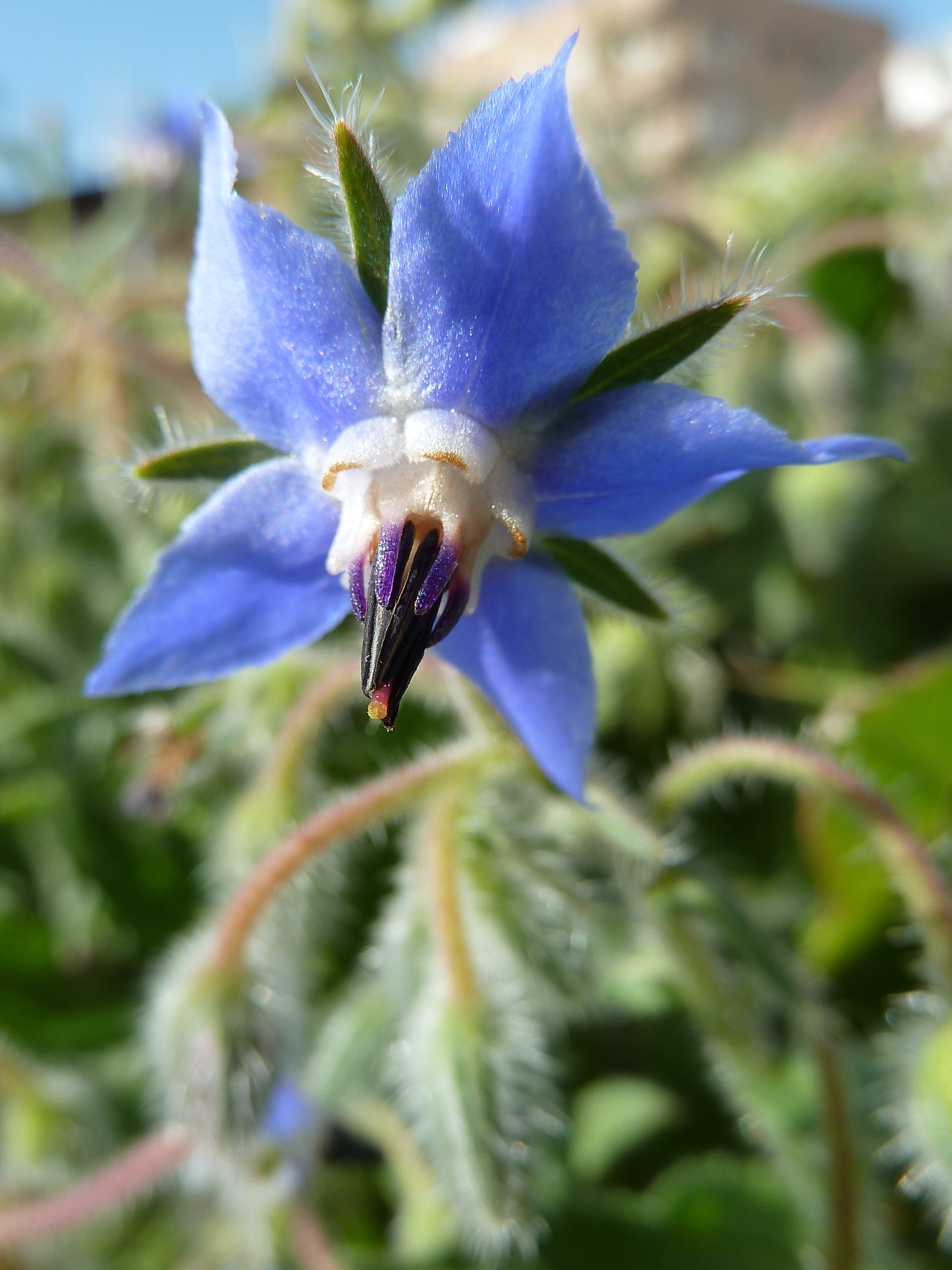
- Borage (Borago officinalis)

Scientific classification
- Kingdom: Plantae
- Clade: Tracheophytes
- Clade: Angiosperms
- Clade: Eudicots
- Clade: Asterids
- Order: Boraginales
- Family: Boraginaceae; Juss.

= Boraginaceae =

Family of flowering plants

Boraginaceae, the borage or forget-me-not family, has two significantly different circumscriptions as of December 2025. In the narrower circumscription, Boraginaceae sensu stricto is one of 11 families placed in the order Boraginales and includes about 90–120 genera. This approach was developed by the Boraginales Working Group. In the older, broader circumscription, Boraginaceae sensu lato is the only family in the order Boraginales, and includes about 155 genera.

== Description ==
These plants have alternately arranged leaves, or a combination of alternate and opposite leaves. The leaf blades usually have a narrow shape; many are linear or lance-shaped. They are smooth-edged or toothed, and some have petioles. Most species have bisexual flowers, but some taxa are dioecious. Most pollination is by hymenopterans, such as bees. Most species have inflorescences that have a coiling shape, at least when new, called scorpioid cymes. The flower has a usually five-lobed calyx. The corolla varies in shape from rotate to bell-shaped to tubular, but it generally has five lobes. It can be green, white, yellow, orange, pink, purple, or blue. There are five stamens and one style with one or two stigmas. The fruit is a drupe, sometimes fleshy.

Most members of this family have hairy leaves. The coarse character of the hairs is due to cystoliths of silicon dioxide and calcium carbonate. These hairs can induce an adverse skin reaction, including itching and rash in some individuals, particularly among people who handle the plants regularly, such as gardeners. In some species, anthocyanins cause the flowers to change color from red to blue with age. This may be a signal to pollinators that a flower is old and depleted of pollen and nectar.

Well-known members of the family include:

- alkanet (Alkanna tinctoria)
- borage (Borago officinalis)
- comfrey (Symphytum spp.)
- fiddleneck (Amsinckia spp.)
- forget-me-not (Myosotis spp.)
- green alkanet (Pentaglottis sempervirens)
- hound's tongue (Cynoglossum spp.)
- lungwort (Pulmonaria spp.)
- oysterplant (Mertensia maritima)
- purple viper's bugloss/Salvation Jane (Echium plantagineum)
- Siberian bugloss (Brunnera macrophylla)
- viper's bugloss (Echium vulgare)

== Taxonomy ==
The APG IV system from 2016 classified the Boraginaceae as the only family in the order Boraginales within the asterids. Under the older Cronquist system, it was included in the Lamiales, but clearly is no more similar to the other families in this order than it is to families in several other asterid orders. A revision of the Boraginales, also from 2016, split the Boraginaceae into 11 distinct families: Boraginaceae sensu stricto, Codonaceae, Coldeniaceae, Cordiaceae, Ehretiaceae, Heliotropiaceae, Hoplestigmataceae, Hydrophyllaceae, Lennoaceae, Namaceae, and Wellstediaceae.

=== Genera ===
As of December 2025, sources that used Boraginaceae sensu stricto included slightly different genera. Some genera accepted by one source were treated as synonyms by other sources, resulting in fewer genera. World Flora Online accepted about 120 genera in Boraginaceae s.s..

- Actinocarya Benth.
- Adelinia J.I.Cohen
- Adelocaryum Brand
- Aegonychon Gray
- Afrotysonia Rauschert
- Ailuroglossum Sutorý
- Alkanna Tausch
- Amblynotus (A.DC.) I.M.Johnst.
- Amphibologyne Brand
- Amsinckia Lehm.
- Amsinckiopsis (I.M.Johnst.) Guilliams, Hasenstab & B.G.Baldwin
- Anchusa L., including Hormuzakia Guşul. and Phyllocara Guşul., accepted by Plants of the World Online
- Ancistrocarya Maxim.
- Andersonglossum J.I.Cohen
- Anoplocaryum Ledeb.
- Antiotrema Hand.-Mazz.
- Antiphytum DC. ex Meisn.
- Arnebia Forssk., including Huynhia Greuter, accepted by Plants of the World Online
- Asperugo L.
- Borago L.
- Bothriospermum Bunge
- Brachybotrys Maxim. ex Oliv.
- Brandella R.R.Mill
- Brunnera Steven
- Buglossoides Moench
- Caccinia Savi
- Cerinthe L.
- Chionocharis I.M.Johnst.
- Choriantha Riedl
- Craniospermum Lehm.
- Crucicaryum Brand
- Cryptantha Lehm. ex G.Don
- Cynoglossopsis Brand
- Cynoglossum L.
- Cynoglottis (Gușul.) Vural & Kit Tan
- Cystostemon Balf.f.
- Dasynotus I.M.Johnst.
- Decalepidanthus Riedl
- Echiochilon Desf.
- Echiostachys Levyns
- Echium L., including Megacaryon Boiss., accepted by Plants of the World Online
- Embadium J.M.Black
- Eremocarya Greene
- Eritrichium Schrad. ex Gaudin
- Gastrocotyle Bunge
- Glandora D.C.Thomas, Weigend & Hilger
- Greeneocharis Gürke & Harms
- Gyrocaryum Valdés
- Hackelia Opiz
- Halacsya Dörfl.
- Harpagonella A.Gray
- Heliocarya Bunge
- Heterocaryum A.DC.
- Iberodes M.Serrano, R.Carbajal & S.Ortiz
- Ivanjohnstonia Kazmi
- Johnstonella Brand
- Lappula Moench
- Lasiocaryum I.M.Johnst.
- Lepechiniella Popov
- Lindelofia Lehm.
- Lithodora Griseb.
- Lithospermum L.
- Lobostemon Lehm.
- Maharanga DC.
- Mairetis I.M.Johnst.
- Mattiastrum (Boiss.) Brand
- Melanortocarya Selvi, Bigazzi, Hilger & Papini
- Memoremea A.Otero, Jim.Mejías, Valcárcel & P.Vargas
- Mertensia Roth
- Microcaryum I.M.Johnst.
- Microparacaryum (Popov ex Riedl) Hilger & Podlech
- Microula Benth.
- Mimophytum Greenm.
- Moltkia Lehm.
- Moltkiopsis I.M.Johnst.
- Myosotidium Hook.
- Myosotis L.
- Myriopus Small
- Neatostema I.M.Johnst.
- Nesocaryum I.M.Johnst.
- Nihon A.Otero, Jim.Mejías, Valcárcel & P.Vargas
- Nogalia Verdc.
- Nonea Medik.
- Ogastemma Brummitt
- Omphalodes Mill.
- Omphalolappula Brand
- Omphalotrigonotis W.T.Wang
- Oncaglossum Sutorý
- Onosma L.
- Oreocarya Greene
- Paracaryum Boiss.
- Paramoltkia Greuter
- Pardoglossum Barbier & Mathez
- Pectocarya DC. ex Meisn.
- Pentaglottis Tausch
- Plagiobothrys Fisch. & C.A.Mey.
- Podonosma Boiss.
- Pontechium Böhle & Hilger
- Pseudoheterocaryum Kaz.Osaloo & Saadati
- Pseudolappula Khoshsokhan & Kaz.Osaloo
- Pulmonaria L.
- Rindera Pall.
- Rochelia Rchb.
- Rotula Lour.
- Sauria Bajtenov
- Selkirkia Hemsl.
- Simpsonanthus Guilliams, Hasenstab & B.G.Baldwin
- Sinojohnstonia Hu
- Solenanthus Ledeb.
- Stenosolenium Turcz.
- Stephanocaryum Popov
- Suchtelenia Kar. ex Meisn.
- Symphytum L.
- Thaumatocaryon Baill., including Moritzia DC. ex Meisn., accepted by Plants of the World Online
- Thyrocarpus Hance
- Tianschaniella B.Fedtsch. ex Popov
- Tournefortia L.
- Trachelanthus Kunze
- Trachystemon D.Don
- Trichodesma R.Br.
- Trigonocaryum Trautv.
- Trigonotis Steven

=== Former genera ===
As of December 2025, genera placed in Boraginaceae sensu lato by Plants of the World Online, but placed in other families by sources that use the Boraginales Working Group system were:

- Codonaceae
  - Codon L.
- Coldeniaceae
  - Coldenia L.
- Cordiaceae
  - Cordia L.
  - Varronia P.Browne
- Ehretiaceae
  - Bourreria P.Browne
  - Ehretia P.Browne
  - Halgania Gaudich.
  - Keraunea Cheek & Sim.-Bianch.
  - Lepidocordia Ducke
  - Rochefortia Sw.
  - Tiquilia Pers.
- Heliotropiaceae
  - Euploca Nutt.
  - Heliotropium Tourn. ex L.
  - Ixorhea Fenzl
- Hoplestigmataceae
  - Hoplestigma Pierre
- Hydrophyllaceae
  - Draperia Torr.
  - Ellisia L.
  - Emmenanthe Benth.
  - Eucrypta Nutt.
  - Hesperochiron S.Watson
  - Hydrophyllum L.
  - Nemophila Nutt. ex W.P.C.Barton
  - Phacelia Juss.
  - Pholistoma Lilja
  - Romanzoffia Cham.
  - Tricardia Torr. ex S.Watson
- Lennoaceae
  - Lennoa Lex.
  - Pholisma Nutt. ex Hook.
- Namaceae
  - Eriodictyon Benth.
  - Nama L.
  - Wigandia Kunth
- Wellstediaceae
  - Wellstedia Novák
