= Craniospermum =

Scientific classification
- Kingdom: Plantae
- Clade: Tracheophytes
- Clade: Angiosperms
- Clade: Eudicots
- Clade: Asterids
- Order: Boraginales
- Family: Boraginaceae
- Subfamily: Cynoglossoideae
- Tribe: Craniospermeae
- Genus: Craniospermum; Lehm.

Species
- See text

Synonyms
- Diploloma Schrenk

Genus of Boraginaceae plants

Craniospermum is a genus of flowering plants in the family Boraginaceae, native to Kazakhstan, the Altai, Siberia (Buryatiya, Irkutsk, Tuva), Mongolia, and Xinjiang and Inner Mongolia in China. They are tuft-forming biennial or perennial herbs, and are generally highly endemic, thought to be relicts of the hypothesized ancient Mediterranean flora.

== Species ==
Currently accepted species include:

- Craniospermum canescens DC.
- Craniospermum desertorum Ovczinnikova & A.Korolyuk
- Craniospermum mongolicum I.M.Johnst.
- Craniospermum pseudotuvinicum Ovczinnikova & A.Korolyuk
- Craniospermum subfloccosum Krylov
- Craniospermum subvillosum Lehm.
- Craniospermum tuvinicum Ovczinnikova
