= Cynoglossopsis =

Scientific classification
- Kingdom: Plantae
- Clade: Tracheophytes
- Clade: Angiosperms
- Clade: Eudicots
- Clade: Asterids
- Order: Boraginales
- Family: Boraginaceae
- Genus: Cynoglossopsis; Brand

Genus of flowering plants

Cynoglossopsis is a genus of flowering plants belonging to the family Boraginaceae.

Its native range is Northeastern Tropical Africa.

Species:

- Cynoglossopsis latifolia (Hochst. ex A.Rich.) Brand
- Cynoglossopsis somaliensis Riedl
