= Oncaglossum =

Scientific classification
- Kingdom: Plantae
- Clade: Tracheophytes
- Clade: Angiosperms
- Clade: Eudicots
- Clade: Asterids
- Order: Boraginales
- Family: Boraginaceae
- Genus: Oncaglossum; Sutorý (2010)
- Species: O. pringlei

Binomial name
- Oncaglossum pringlei (Greenm.) Sutorý (2010)

Synonyms
- Cynoglossum pringlei Greenm. (1905)

Genus of flowering plants

Oncaglossum pringlei is a species of flowering plant in the family Boraginaceae. It is the sole species in genus Oncaglossum. It is native to subtropical Mexico, where it ranges from Coahuila to Michoacán.

The species was first described as Cynoglossum pringlei by Jesse More Greenman in 1905. In 2010 Karel Sutorý placed the species in its own genus as Oncaglossum pringlei.
