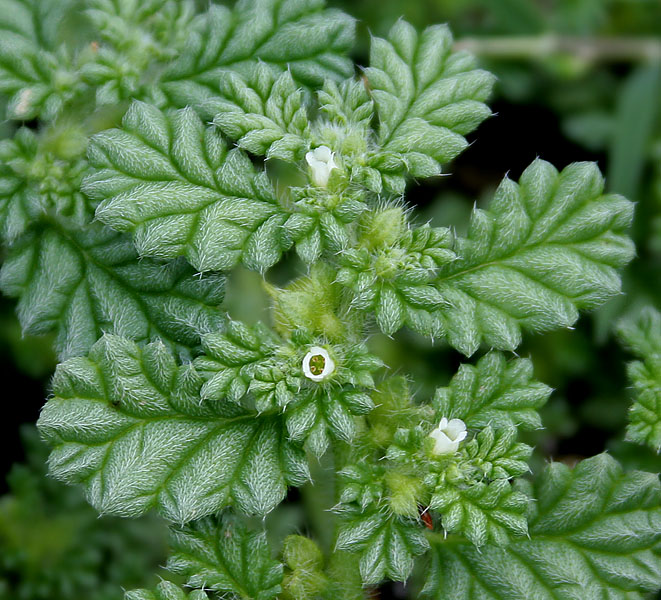

Scientific classification
- Kingdom: Plantae
- Clade: Tracheophytes
- Clade: Angiosperms
- Clade: Eudicots
- Clade: Asterids
- Order: Boraginales
- Family: Coldeniaceae; J.S.Mill. & Gottschling
- Genus: Coldenia; L.
- Species: C. procumbens

Binomial name
- Coldenia procumbens L.

Synonyms
- Lobophyllum F.Muell. (1857); Monomesia Raf. (1838); Coldenia angolensis Welw. (1859); Lobophyllum tetrandrum F.Muell. (1857); Waltheria microphylla Miq. ex C.B.Clarke (1883), not validly publ.

= Coldenia =

Genus of flowering plants

Coldenia, named after C. Colden, is a genus of flowering plants in the family Coldeniaceae. It is the only genus in the family. As of December 2025, the sole accepted species is Coldenia procumbens.

== Description ==
Coldenia procumbens is a herbaceous annual plant with a procumbent, mat-forming habit. The stems and leaves are densely hairy. The leaves are elliptic, oblong, or obovate, and are typically 0.5 to 3.3 cm long. The flowers are small and have a villous calyx and a white, deciduous corolla. The ovaries are glandular-pubescent. The anthers are 0.3 mm and the styles are 0.1-0.2 mm long. The four-lobed fruit is 4-5 mm in diameter and beaked.

== Taxonomy ==
The genus was traditionally included in the borage family, Boraginaceae sensu lato. It was assigned to the subfamily Ehretioideae, but molecular data revealed it to be more closely related to the genus Cordia, so that other authors placed in Cordioideae. Subsequently, it was placed in its own family, Coldeniaceae, within the Boraginales order, by the Boraginales Working Group. As of December 2025, this placement is accepted by World Flora Online, but not by Plants of the World Online which retains it in a broadly circumscribed Boraginaceae.

== Distribution and habitat ==
Coldenia procumbens is a wide-ranging species in tropical and subtropical regions, being found throughout Africa, South and Southeast Asia, New Guinea, and Australia. It can be found in muddy areas near water.

== Bibliography ==
- Luebert, Federico; Cecchi, Lorenzo; Frohlich, Michael W.; Gottschling, Marc; Guilliams, C. Matt; Hasenstab-Lehman, Kristen E.; Hilger, Hartmut H.; Miller, James S.; Mittelbach, Moritz; Nazaire, Mare; Nepi, Massimo; Nocentini, Daniele; Ober, Dietrich; Olmstead, Richard G.; Selvi, Federico; Simpson, Michael G.; Sutorý, Karel; Valdés, Benito; Walden, Genevieve K.; Weigend, Maximilian (24 June 2016). "Boraginales Working Group: Familial classification of the Boraginales". Taxon. 65 (3): 502–522. doi:10.12705/653.5. hdl:2158/1062790.
