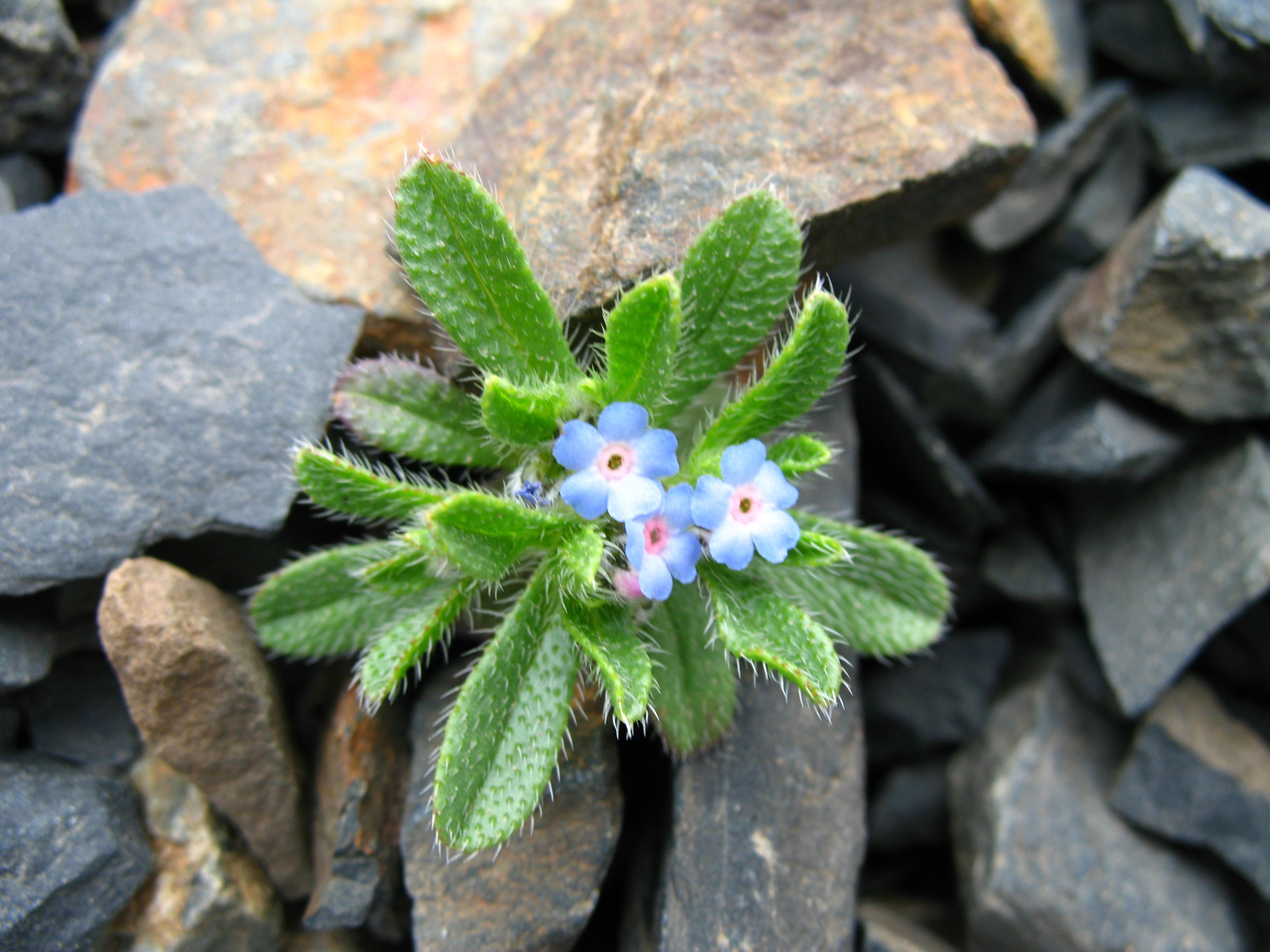
- Trigonocaryum involucratum

Scientific classification
- Kingdom: Plantae
- Clade: Tracheophytes
- Clade: Angiosperms
- Clade: Eudicots
- Clade: Asterids
- Order: Boraginales
- Family: Boraginaceae
- Genus: Trigonocaryum; Trautv. (1875)
- Species: T. involucratum

Binomial name
- Trigonocaryum involucratum (Steven) Kusn. (1910)

Synonyms
- Myosotis involucrata Steven (1812); Strophiostoma involucratum (Steven) O.D.Nikif. (2016); Trigonocaryum prostratum Trautv. (1875)

= Trigonocaryum =

Genus of flowering plants

Trigonocaryum is a genus of flowering plants belonging to the family Boraginaceae. It contains a single species, Trigonocaryum involucratum, which is endemic to the Caucasus.
