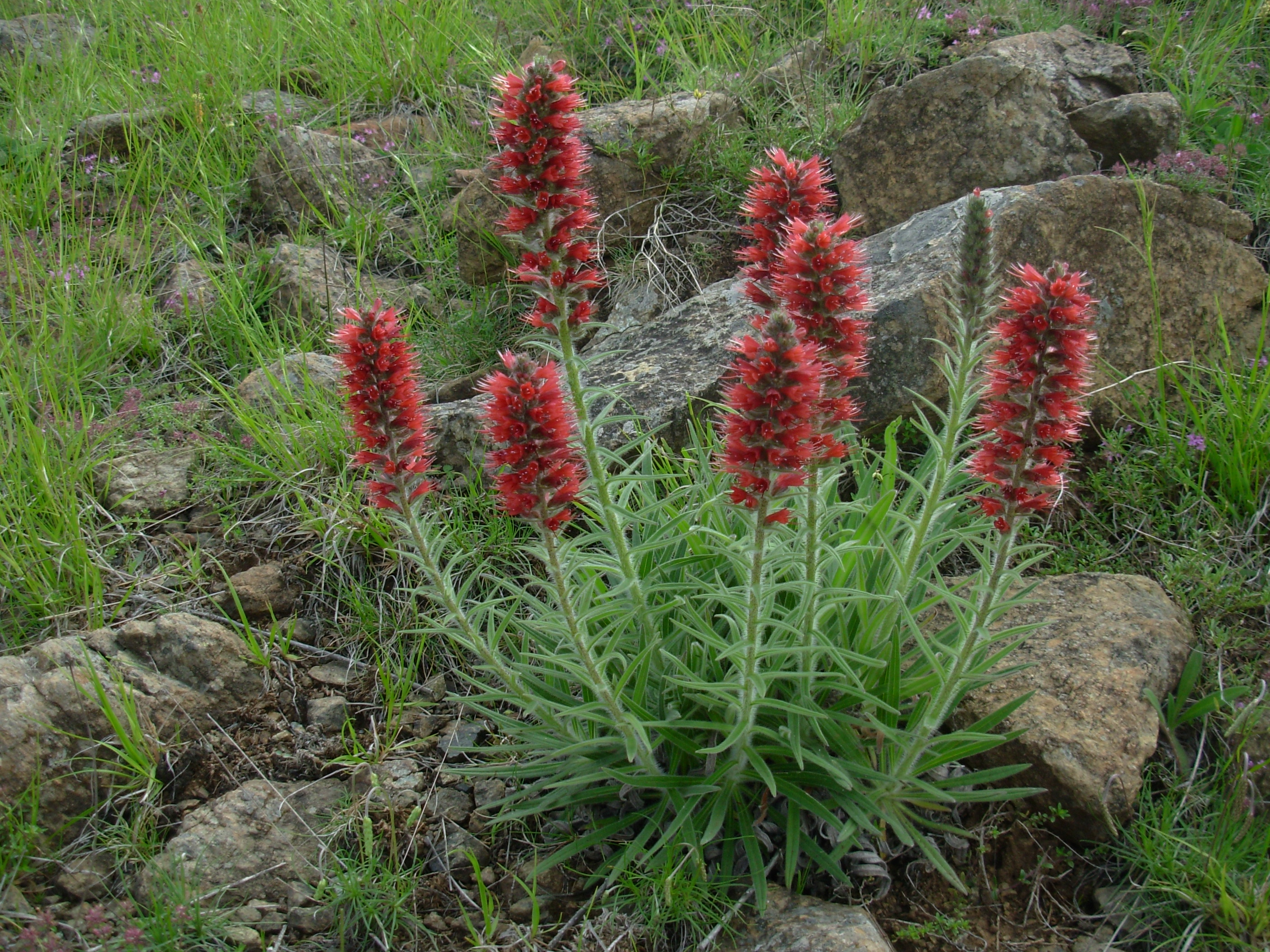

Scientific classification
- Kingdom: Plantae
- Clade: Tracheophytes
- Clade: Angiosperms
- Clade: Eudicots
- Clade: Asterids
- Order: Boraginales
- Family: Boraginaceae
- Genus: Pontechium; Böhle & Hilger (2000)
- Species: P. maculatum

Binomial name
- Pontechium maculatum (L.) Böhle & Hilger (2000)

Synonyms
- Synonymy: Echium acutifolium Lehm. (1817); Echium clavatum Willd. ex Lehm. (1818); Echium italicum S.G.Gmel. (1773), nom. illeg.; Echium kochii Litard. (1942); Echium linearifolium K.Koch (1849), nom. illeg.; Echium maculatum L. (1759); Echium papillosum K.Koch (1843), nom. illeg.; Echium popovii Dobrocz. (1977); Echium rubrum Jacq. (1778), nom. illeg.; Echium russicum S.G.Gmel. (1774); Echium russicum var. acutifolium (Lehm.) G.Klotz (1960); Echium thyrsoideum Vent. (1805); Pontechium maculatum var. acutifolium (Lehm.) Böhle & Hilger (2000)

= Pontechium =

Genus of flowering plants

Pontechium maculatum is a species of flowering plant in the borage family, Boraginaceae. It is the sole species in genus Pontechium. It is a biennial native to parts of Europe and western Asia, ranging from Poland and Austria through the Balkans and Ukraine to eastern European Russia, the Caucasus, Turkey, and Turkmenistan.

The species was first described as Echium maculatum by Carl Linnaeus in 1759. In 2000 Böhle & Hilger placed it in its own genus as Pontechium maculatum.
