= Bugloss =

Bugloss is a name (from Greek βούγλωσσον, boúglōsson, 'ox-tongue') used for several plants in the borage family (Boraginaceae):

- Barrelier's bugloss (Cynoglottis barrelieri)
- Bugloss or small bugloss (Anchusa arvensis)
- Bugloss fiddleneck (Amsinckia lycopsoides)
- Common bugloss (Anchusa officinalis)
- Cretan viper's bugloss (Echium creticum)
- Dyers' bugloss (Alcanna tinctoria)
- Giant viper's bugloss (Echium pininana)
- Italian Bugloss (Anchusa azurea)
- Mount Teide bugloss (Echium wildpretii)
- Purple viper's bugloss (Echium plantagineum)
- Siberian bugloss (Brunnera macrophylla)
- Strigose bugloss (Anchusa strigosa)
- Viper's bugloss (Echium vulgare)

Bugloss is part of the name of an insect:

- The viper's bugloss (Hadena irregularis), a noctuid moth in the tribe Hadenini, whose caterpillar feeds on viper's bugloss and related plants

Bugloss may also be:

- Bugloss (French: Buglosse), the 28th day of the month of Floréal in the French Republican calendar
- Viper and Bugloss, characters created by columnist Peter Simple: see List of Peter Simple characters
- HMS Bugloss (K306), a Flower-class corvette of the British Royal Navy
