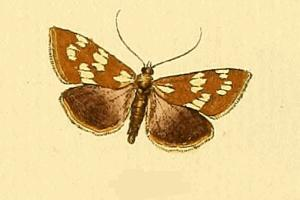

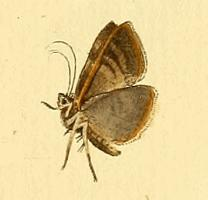

Scientific classification
- Kingdom: Animalia
- Phylum: Arthropoda
- Clade: Pancrustacea
- Class: Insecta
- Order: Lepidoptera
- Family: Crambidae
- Genus: Epascestria
- Species: E. pustulalis

Binomial name
- Epascestria pustulalis (Hubner, 1823)

Synonyms
- Pyralis pustulalis Hubner, 1823; Phlyctaenodes pustulalis var. orientalis Caradja, 1916

= Epascestria pustulalis =

Species of moth

Epascestria pustulalis is a species of moth in the family Crambidae. It is found in large parts of Europe, except Ireland, Great Britain, Norway, Finland, Denmark, the Benelux, France, Switzerland, Portugal, Slovenia and Croatia. It is also present in the Near East, including Lebanon and Turkey.

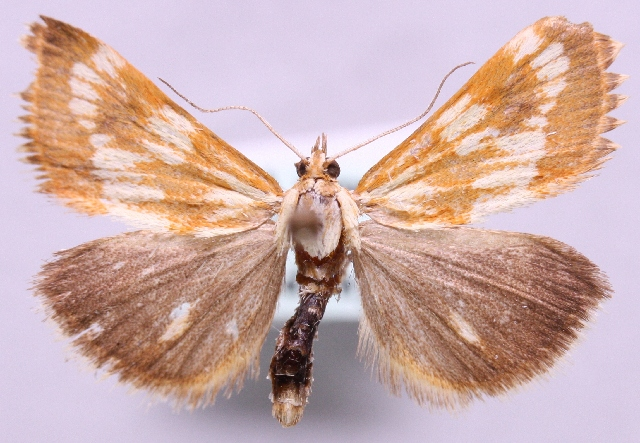

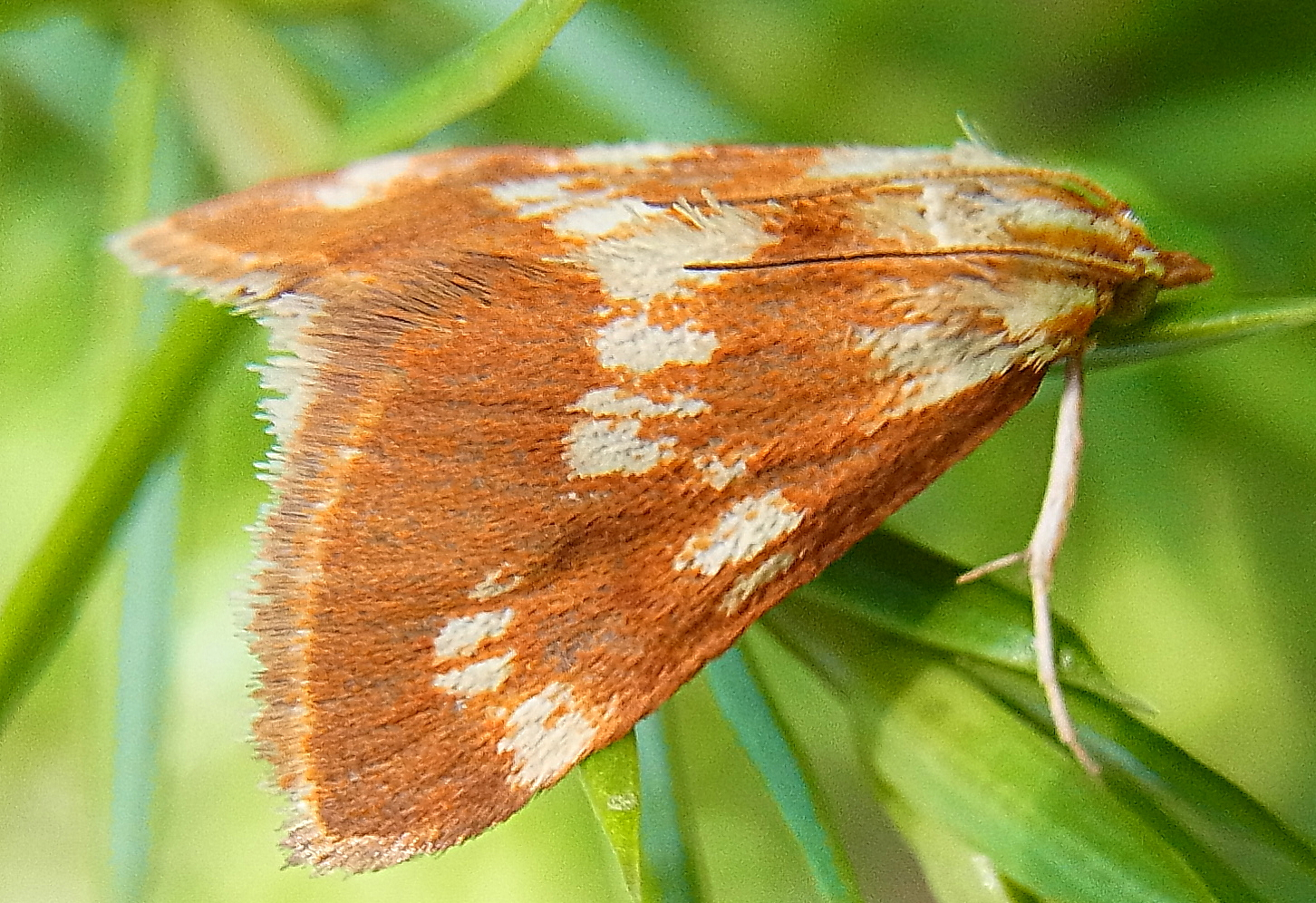

The wingspan is 17–20 mm.

The larvae feed on Anchusa officinalis, Anchusa strigosa and Echium species. They mine the leaves of their host plant. Larvae have a grey body and a black head. They can be found in May.
