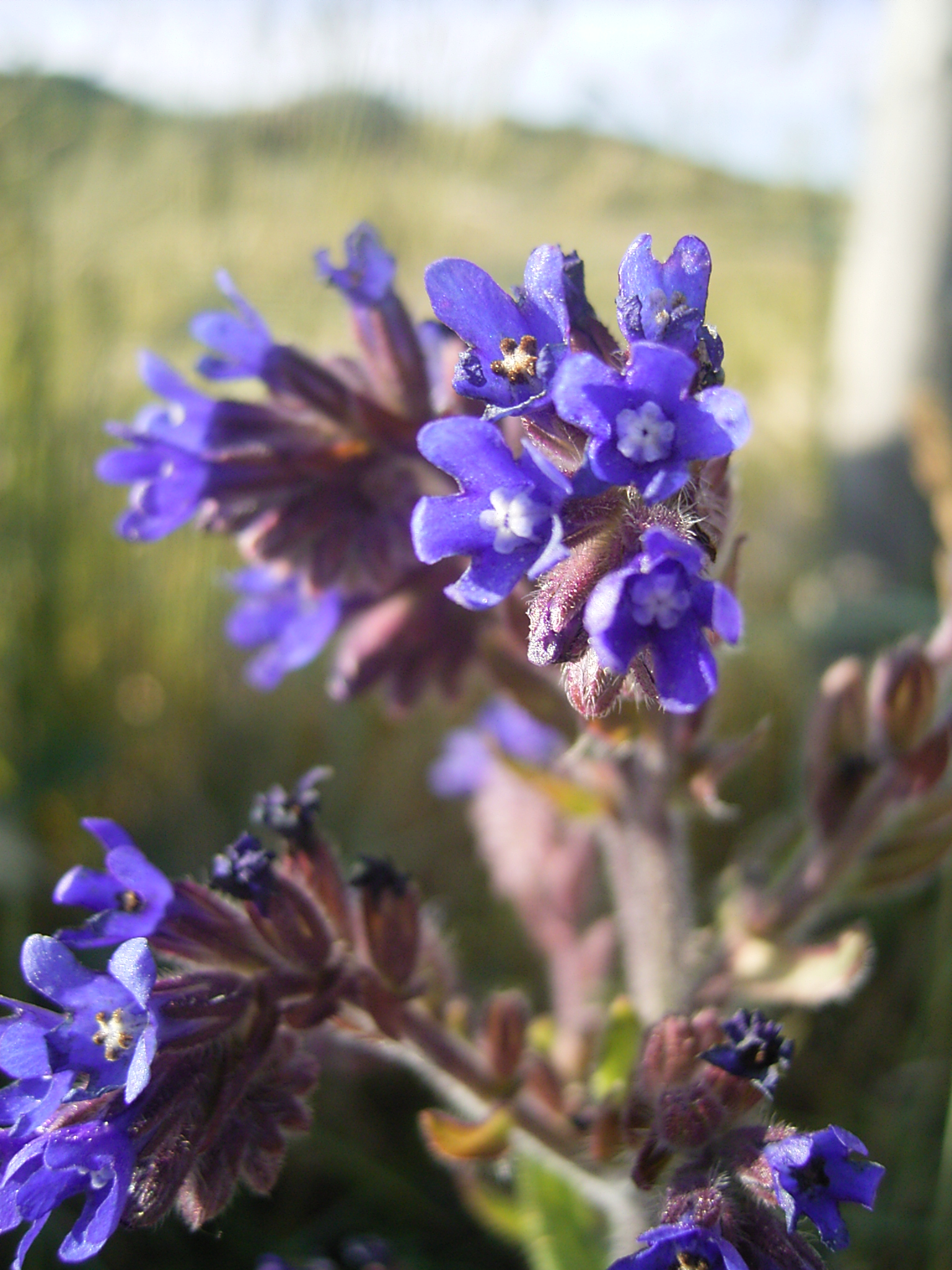
- Anchusa officinalis

Scientific classification
- Kingdom: Plantae
- Clade: Embryophytes
- Clade: Tracheophytes
- Clade: Spermatophytes
- Clade: Angiosperms
- Clade: Eudicots
- Clade: Asterids
- Order: Boraginales
- Family: Boraginaceae
- Subfamily: Boraginoideae
- Genus: Anchusa; L. (1753)

Type species
- Anchusa officinalis L.

Synonyms
- Anchusella Bigazzi, E.Nardi & Selvi (1997); Buglossa Gray (1821 publ. 1822), nom. superfl.; Buglossites Bubani (1897), nom. superfl.; Buglossum Mill. (1754); Echioides Fabr. (1759), nom. superfl.; Lycopsis L. (1753); Stomotechium Lehm. (1817)

= Anchusa =

Genus of flowering plants in the borage family

The genus Anchusa belongs to the borage family (Boraginaceae). It includes about 35 species found growing in Europe, North Africa, South Africa and Western Asia. They are introduced in the United States.

They consist of annual plants, biennial plants and perennial plants with the general characteristics of the borage family. They are commonly herbaceous. The leaves are simple or undulate, covered with stiff hairs.

The small radially symmetrical flowers are sapphire blue and retain their colour a long time. The plants show numerous flowers with five sepals, united at their bases, and five petals forming a narrow tube facing upwards. The flowers grow in several axillary cymes, simple or branched, or are clustered at the end. The flowers are much frequented by bees.

The genus Anchusa is commonly used in trough or rock gardens.

The roots of Anchusa (just like those of Alkanna and Lithospermum) contain anchusin (or alkanet-red), a red-brown resinoid colouring matter. It is insoluble in water, but soluble in alcohol, chloroform and ether.

Anchusa species are used as food plants by the larvae of some Lepidoptera species including Coleophora pennella.

== Taxonomy ==
There are four subgenera: Buglossum, Buglossoides, Buglossellum and Anchusa.

The first two form one subclade, the other two each a separate subclade. The subclade of the subgenus Anchusa (containing Anchusa capensis) is largely unresolved.

If we consider Anchusa s.l., then it includes the subgenus Limbata, which diverges markedly in its floral morphology.

The subgenera Buglossum, Buglossellum and Buglossoides clearly need new independent entities, while the subgenus Anchusa needs a narrower concept. This way taxonomy and phylogeny with respect to Anchusa can become completely analogous.

== Species ==
35 species are accepted.

- Anchusa aegyptiaca (L.) A.DC.
- Anchusa affinis R.Br. ex DC.
- Anchusa arvensis (L.) M.Bieb. – small bugloss, bugloss, annual bugloss
- Anchusa atlantica Ball
- Anchusa azurea Mill. – Italian bugloss, large blue alkanet
  - Anchusa azurea var. azurea
  - Anchusa azurea var. kurdica (Guşul.) D.F.Chamb.
  - Anchusa azurea var. macrocarpa (Boiss. & Hohen.) D.F.Chamb.
- Anchusa × baumgartenii (Nyman) Guşul.
- Anchusa calcarea Boiss.
- Anchusa capensis Thunb. – Cape bugloss, Cape forget-me-not
- Anchusa cespitosa Lam.
- Anchusa cretica Mill.
- Anchusa crispa Viv. (status vulnerable to endangered in France and Italy)
- Anchusa × digenea Guşul.
- Anchusa dinsmorei Rech.f.
- Anchusa formosa Selvi, Bigazzi & Bacch. – Sardinia
- Anchusa gmelinii Ledeb.
- Anchusa hybrida Ten.
- Anchusa iranica Rech.f. & Esfand.
- Anchusa konyaensis Yıld.
- Anchusa leptophylla Roem. & Schult.
- Anchusa leucantha Selvi & Bigazzi – Greece
- Anchusa milleri Lam. ex Spreng.
- Anchusa montelinasana Angius, Pontec. & Selvi
- Anchusa ochroleuca M.Bieb. – yellow alkanet
- Anchusa officinalis L. – true alkanet, bugloss, common bugloss, corn bugloss, field bugloss (type species)
  - Anchusa officinalis subsp. intacta (Griseb.) Selvi & Bigazz
  - Anchusa officinalis subsp. officinalis
- Anchusa ovata Lehm.
- Anchusa procera Besser ex Link
- Anchusa pseudoochroleuca Des.-Shost.
- Anchusa puechii Valdés
- Anchusa pusilla Gușul.
- Anchusa riparia A.DC.
- Anchusa samothracica Bigazzi & Selvi
- Anchusa strigosa Banks & Sol.
- Anchusa stylosa M.Bieb.
  - Anchusa stylosa subsp. spruneri (Boiss.) Nyman
  - Anchusa stylosa subsp. stylosa
- Anchusa thessala Boiss. & Spruner
- Anchusa × thirkeana Guşul.
- Anchusa tiberiadis Post
- Anchusa undulata L.
  - Anchusa undulata subsp. granatensis (Boiss.) Valdés
  - Anchusa undulata subsp. lamprocarpa Braun-Blanq. & Maire
  - Anchusa undulata subsp. sartorii (Heldr. ex Guşul.) Selvi & Bigazzi
  - Anchusa undulata subsp. undulata
- Anchusa variegata (L.) Lehm.

=== Formerly placed here ===
- Cynoglottis barrelieri (All.) Vural & Kit Tan (as Anchusa barrelieri (All.) Vitman) – Barrelier's bugloss
- Gastrocotyle macedonica (Degen & Dörfl.) Bigazzi, Hilger & Selvi (as Anchusa macedonica Degen & Dörfler)
- Pentaglottis sempervirens (L.) Tausch ex L.H.Bailey (as Anchusa sempervirens L.) – evergreen alkanet
- Phyllocara aucheri (A.DC.) Guşul. (as Anchusa aucheri A.DC.)
