= Ommidion modestum =

Scientific classification
- Kingdom: Animalia
- Phylum: Arthropoda
- Class: Insecta
- Order: Coleoptera
- Suborder: Polyphaga
- Infraorder: Cucujiformia
- Family: Cerambycidae
- Genus: Ommidion
- Species: O. modestum

Binomial name
- Ommidion modestum Newman, 1840

Species of beetle

Ommidion modestum is a species of beetle in the family Cerambycidae.
