= Ommidion mirim =

Scientific classification
- Kingdom: Animalia
- Phylum: Arthropoda
- Class: Insecta
- Order: Coleoptera
- Suborder: Polyphaga
- Infraorder: Cucujiformia
- Family: Cerambycidae
- Genus: Ommidion
- Species: O. mirim

Binomial name
- Ommidion mirim Martins, 1998

Species of beetle

Ommidion mirim is a species of beetle in the family Cerambycidae. It was first described by Martins in 1998.
