= Ancylodonta tristis =

Scientific classification
- Kingdom: Animalia
- Phylum: Arthropoda
- Class: Insecta
- Order: Coleoptera
- Suborder: Polyphaga
- Infraorder: Cucujiformia
- Family: Cerambycidae
- Genus: Ancylodonta
- Species: A. tristis

Binomial name
- Ancylodonta tristis Blanchard, 1851

Species of beetle

Ancylodonta tristis is a species of beetle in the family Cerambycidae.
