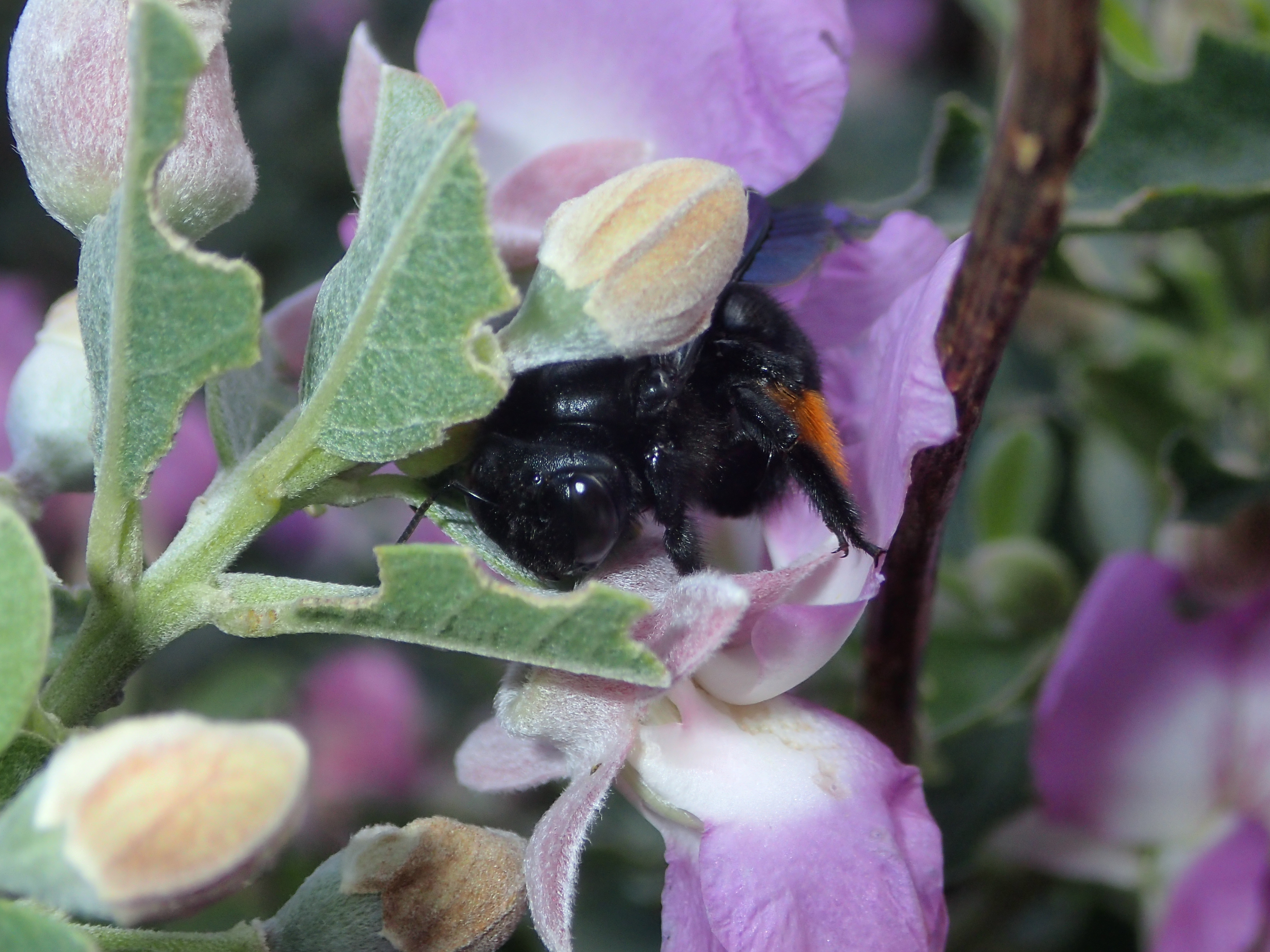
- Female in the Western Cape

Scientific classification
- Domain: Eukaryota
- Kingdom: Animalia
- Phylum: Arthropoda
- Class: Insecta
- Order: Hymenoptera
- Family: Apidae
- Genus: Xylocopa
- Species: X. rufitarsis

Binomial name
- Xylocopa rufitarsis Lepeletier, 1841

Synonyms
- X. maculosa; X. rufitarsis namaquaensis

= Xylocopa rufitarsis =

Species of bee

Xylocopa rufitarsis is a species of carpenter bee native to South Africa. It has been assigned to the subgenus Xylomelissa. It was seen to visit flowers of a wide range of plants, many of them Fabaceae such as Acacia karroo, Aspalathus linearis, A. spinescens, Calpurnia glabrata, Lebeckia multiflora, Lebeckia sericea, peas (Pisum sativum) and Tipuana tipu, but also Agave sp., Anchusa capensis, Hermannia gariepina, Lobostemon trichotomus, Moraea cookii, Populus sp., Prenia pallens, Zygophyllum morgsana, Salvia dentata and other Lamiaceae. Nests have been found in Metalasia muricata, Psoralea aphylla and Pinus sp. They are parasitized by Anthrax badius.
