= Ancylodonta almeidai =

Scientific classification
- Kingdom: Animalia
- Phylum: Arthropoda
- Class: Insecta
- Order: Coleoptera
- Suborder: Polyphaga
- Infraorder: Cucujiformia
- Family: Cerambycidae
- Genus: Ancylodonta
- Species: A. almeidai

Binomial name
- Ancylodonta almeidai (Mendes, 1946)

Species of beetle

Ambeodontus almeidai is a species of beetle in the subfamily Cerambycinae.
