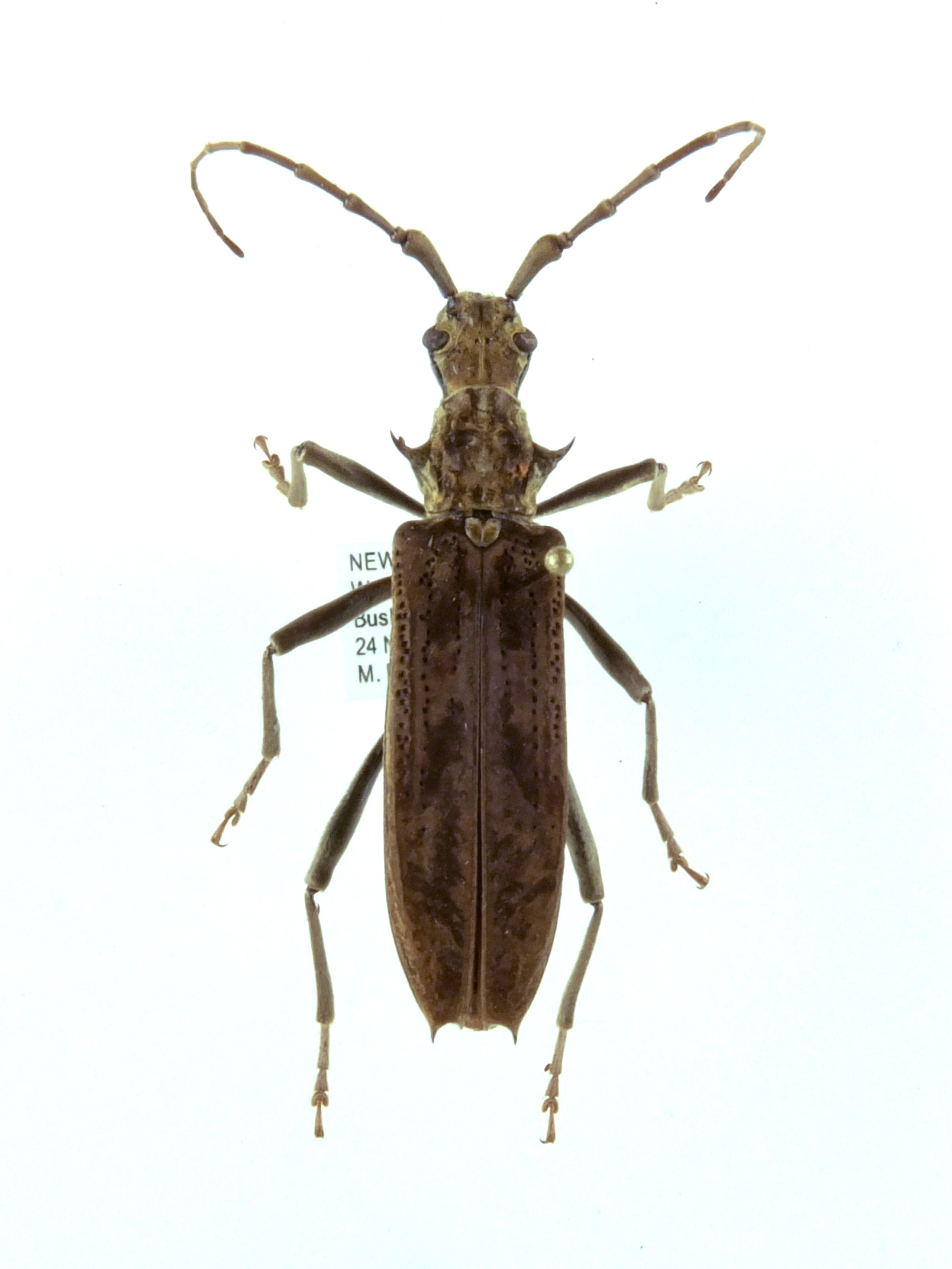
- Dorsal view of a Blosyropus spinosus specimen in the Whanganui Regional Museum

Scientific classification
- Domain: Eukaryota
- Kingdom: Animalia
- Phylum: Arthropoda
- Class: Insecta
- Order: Coleoptera
- Suborder: Polyphaga
- Infraorder: Cucujiformia
- Family: Cerambycidae
- Subfamily: Cerambycinae
- Tribe: Phlyctaenodini
- Genus: Blosyropus
- Species: B. spinosus

Binomial name
- Blosyropus spinosus Redtenbacher, 1868

= Blosyropus spinosus =

Species of beetle

Blosyropus spinosus, also known as the spiny longhorn or spiny silver-pine borer, is a rare species of longhorn beetle endemic to New Zealand. It has no specific Māori name, but the term for large longhorns of this type are howaka and kapapa.

== Taxonomy ==
B. spinosus was first described in 1868 by Ludwig Redtenbacher in his Reise der österreichischen Fregatte Novara um die Erde. The genus Blosyropus is often referred to within the subfamily Lepturinae, but is now considered to be in the Cerambycinae and the tribe Phlyctaenodini.

== Description ==
B. spinosus is one of the largest endemic beetles in New Zealand, growing to around 46 mm long. It is nocturnal, and flightless. The hind wings are shortened or completely reduced in both sexes in this genus. Blosyropus spinosus is dark brown in colour with yellowish hairs on its body. Its key distinguishing characteristic is a single short spine on each side of its head above the eyes and behind the antennae. There are four spines midway along the pronotum (thorax) in front of the elytra.

== Distribution ==
This species is endemic to New Zealand.

== Habitat ==
B. spinosus has been found in forest in many areas of New Zealand. Its larvae have been discovered in rotting logs of a variety of trees including tawa, Dracophyllum, pōhutukawa, manoao (silver pine), and red beech, as well as in podocarp forest. It is a Category I (indeterminate status) Threatened Species.

== Behaviour ==
The adult beetle is attracted to lights. Eggs are laid towards the top of the tree and the larva tunnel downwards as they feed on the rotting wood. Pupation occurs in a large pupal chamber at the base of the tree. This pupal chamber opens to the outside but is plugged with coarsely chewed wood that has not been digested by the larva. After completing metamorphosis, the beetle may overwinter or hibernate within the pupal chamber.

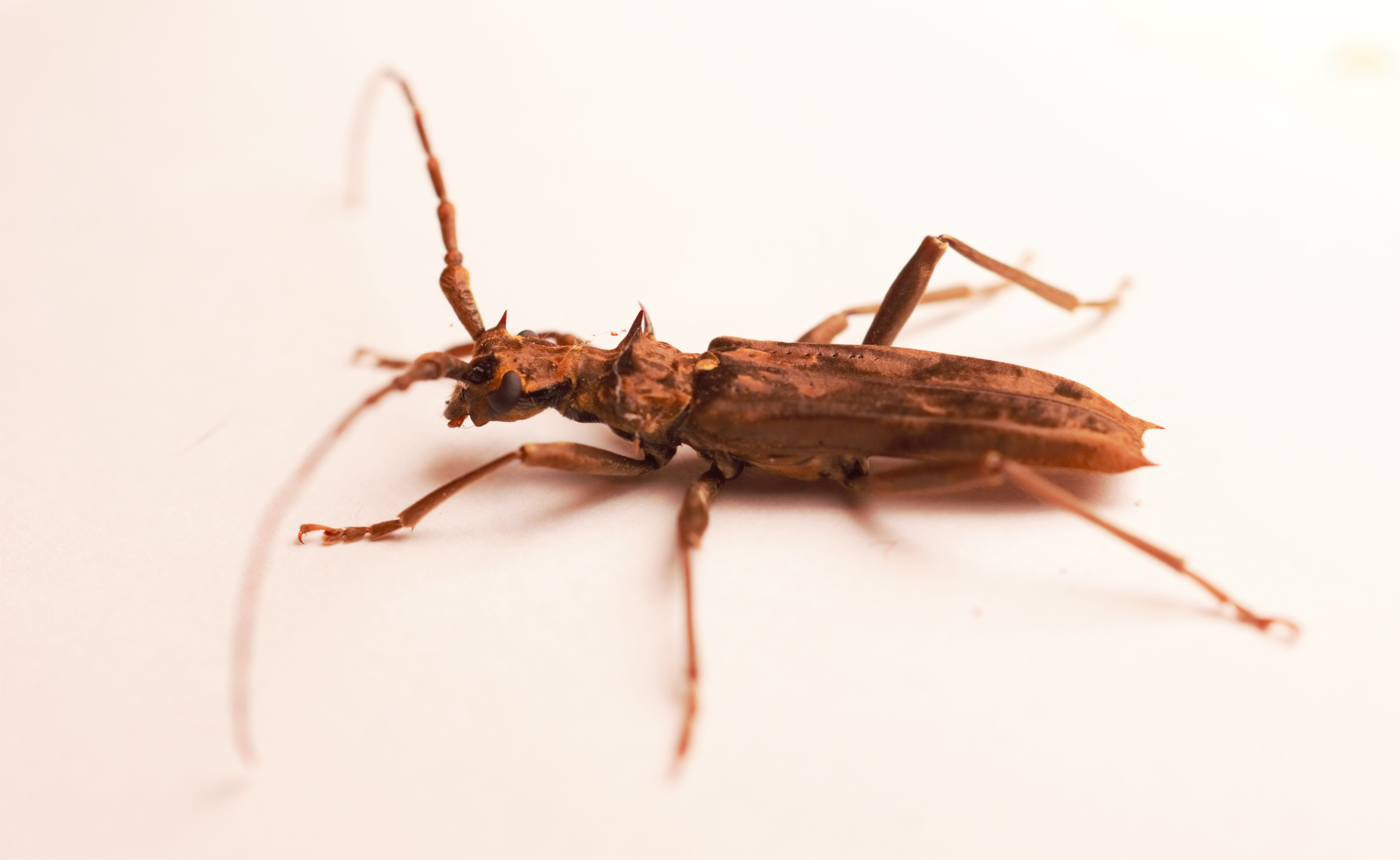
Male Blosyropus spinosus

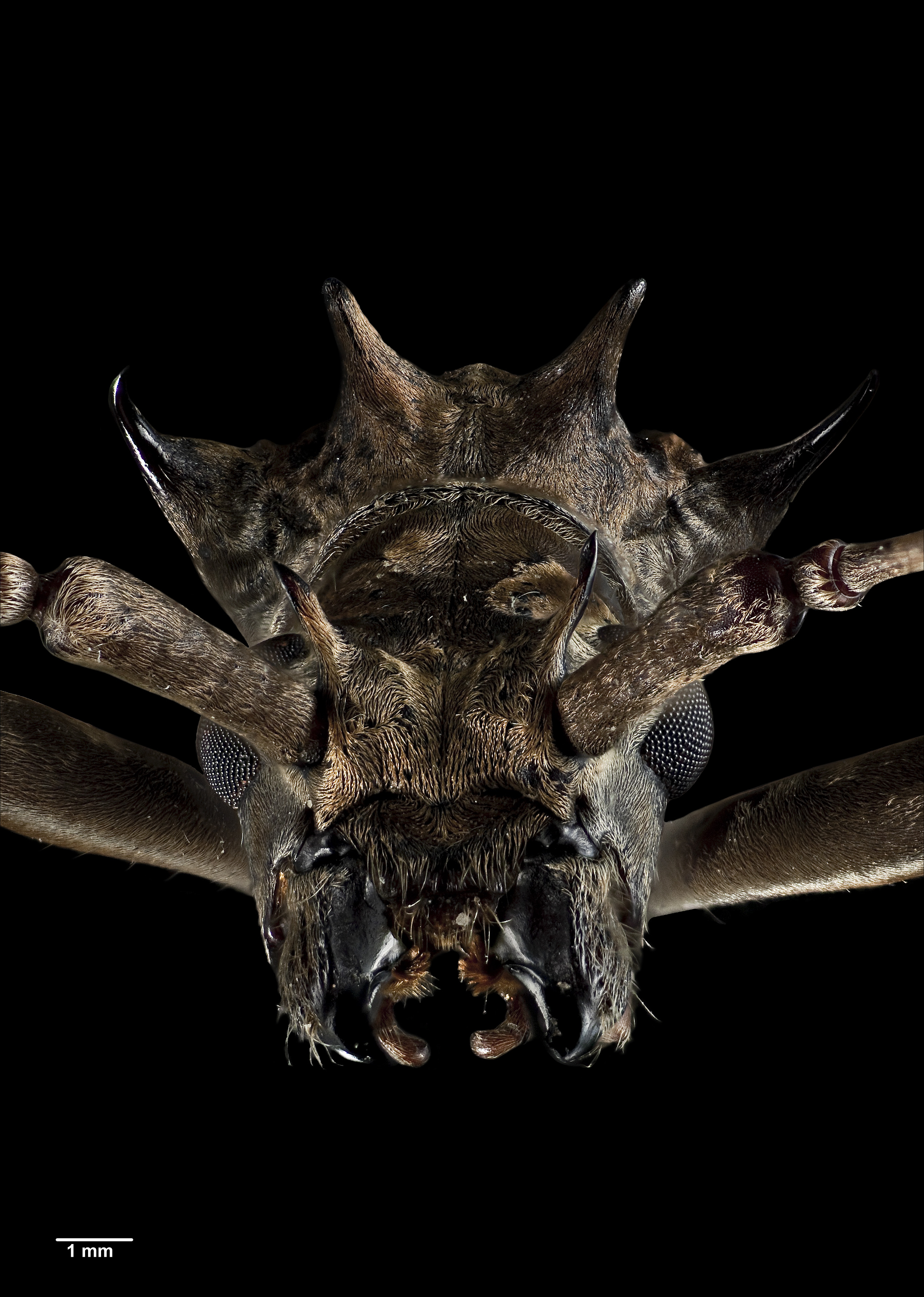
Head of Blosyropus spinosus in the Auckland Museum collection.
