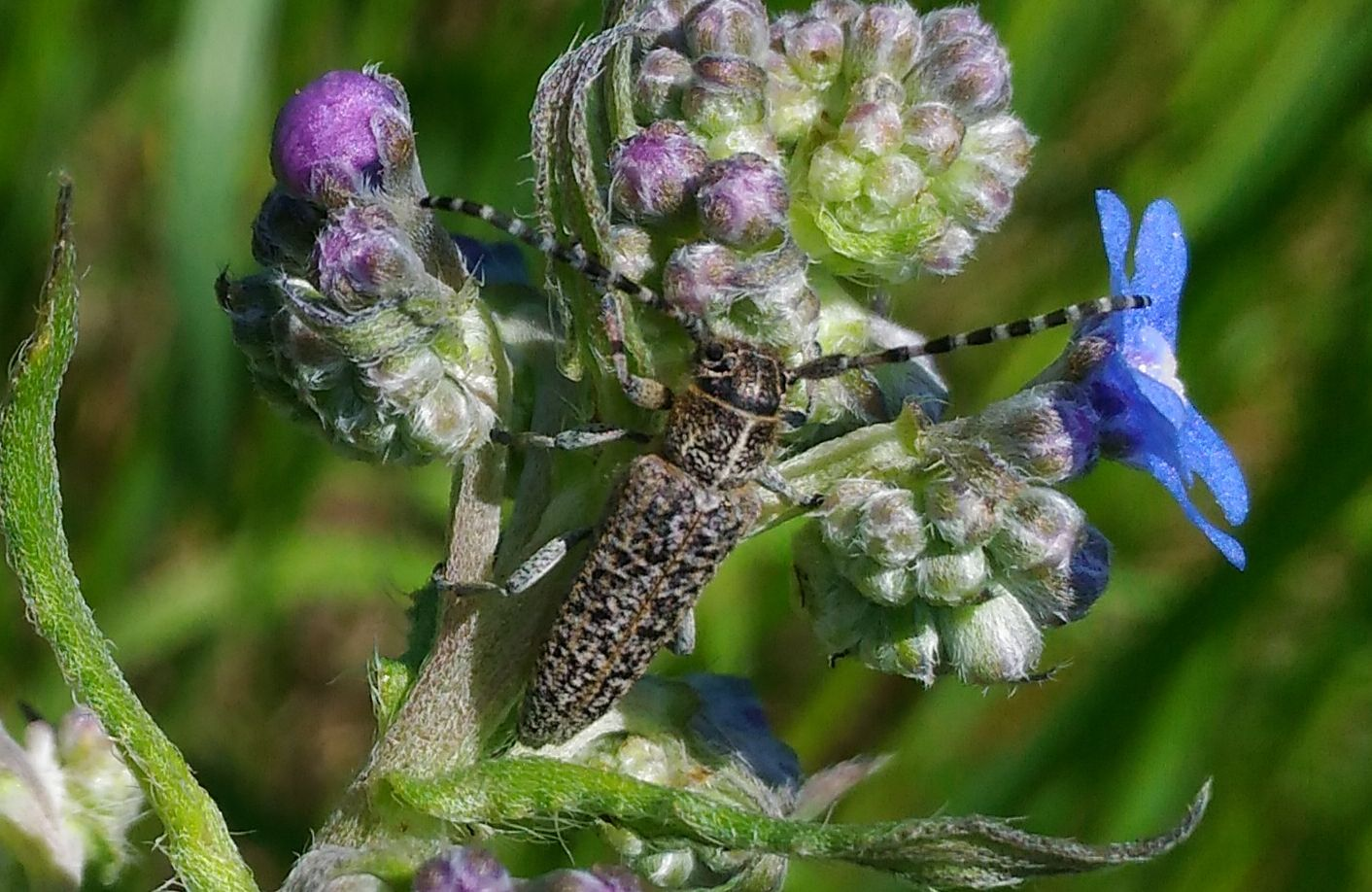

Scientific classification
- Kingdom: Animalia
- Phylum: Arthropoda
- Class: Insecta
- Order: Coleoptera
- Suborder: Polyphaga
- Infraorder: Cucujiformia
- Family: Cerambycidae
- Genus: Phytoecia
- Species: P. tigrina

Binomial name
- Phytoecia tigrina Mulsant, 1851

Synonyms
- Pilemia tigrina (Mulsant, 1851); Phytoecia anchusae Fuss, 1852

= Phytoecia tigrina =

Species of beetle

Phytoecia tigrina is a species of beetle in the family Cerambycidae. It was described by Étienne Mulsant in 1851. It is known from Hungary, Turkey, Bulgaria, Serbia, Romania, and Ukraine. It feeds on Cynoglottis barrelieri.
