= Ancylodonta nitidipennis =

Scientific classification
- Kingdom: Animalia
- Phylum: Arthropoda
- Class: Insecta
- Order: Coleoptera
- Suborder: Polyphaga
- Infraorder: Cucujiformia
- Family: Cerambycidae
- Genus: Ancylodonta
- Species: A. nitidipennis

Binomial name
- Ancylodonta nitidipennis Germain, 1898

Species of beetle

Ancylodonta nitidipennis is a species of beetle in the family Cerambycidae.
