= Ancylodonta apipema =

Scientific classification
- Kingdom: Animalia
- Phylum: Arthropoda
- Class: Insecta
- Order: Coleoptera
- Suborder: Polyphaga
- Infraorder: Cucujiformia
- Family: Cerambycidae
- Genus: Ancylodonta
- Species: A. apipema

Binomial name
- Ancylodonta apipema Martins & Galileo, 2006

Species of beetle

Ambeodontus apipema is a species of beetle in the subfamily Cerambycinae.
