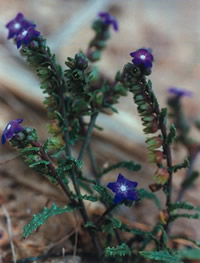

Conservation status
- Endangered (IUCN 3.1)

Scientific classification
- Kingdom: Plantae
- Clade: Tracheophytes
- Clade: Angiosperms
- Clade: Eudicots
- Clade: Asterids
- Order: Boraginales
- Family: Boraginaceae
- Genus: Anchusa
- Species: A. crispa

Binomial name
- Anchusa crispa Viv.

Subspecies
- Anchusa crispa subsp. crispa; Anchusa crispa subsp. maritima (Vals.) Selvi & Bigazzi; Anchusa crispa subsp. valincoana Paradis, C.Piazza & Quilichini

= Anchusa crispa =

Species of flowering plant

Anchusa crispa is a species of plant in the family Boraginaceae. It is native to Corsica and Sardinia. Its natural habitats are Mediterranean-type shrubby vegetation and sandy shores. It is threatened by habitat loss.

Three subspecies are accepted.

- Anchusa crispa subsp. crispa – southeastern Corsica and northern Sardinia
- Anchusa crispa subsp. maritima (Vals.) Selvi & Bigazzi – northern Sardinia
- Anchusa crispa subsp. valincoana Paradis, C.Piazza & Quilichini – western Corsica
