= Epascestria croesusalis =

Scientific classification
- Kingdom: Animalia
- Phylum: Arthropoda
- Clade: Pancrustacea
- Class: Insecta
- Order: Lepidoptera
- Family: Crambidae
- Genus: Epascestria
- Species: E. croesusalis

Binomial name
- Epascestria croesusalis (Hampson, 1913)

Synonyms
- Phlyctaenodes croesusalis Hampson, 1913

Species of moth

Epascestria croesusalis is a moth in the family Crambidae. It was described by George Hampson in 1913. It is found in South Africa.
