= Cynoglottis =

Scientific classification
- Kingdom: Plantae
- Clade: Tracheophytes
- Clade: Angiosperms
- Clade: Eudicots
- Clade: Asterids
- Order: Boraginales
- Family: Boraginaceae
- Genus: Cynoglottis (Guşul.) Vural & Kit Tan (1983)

Genus of flowering plants

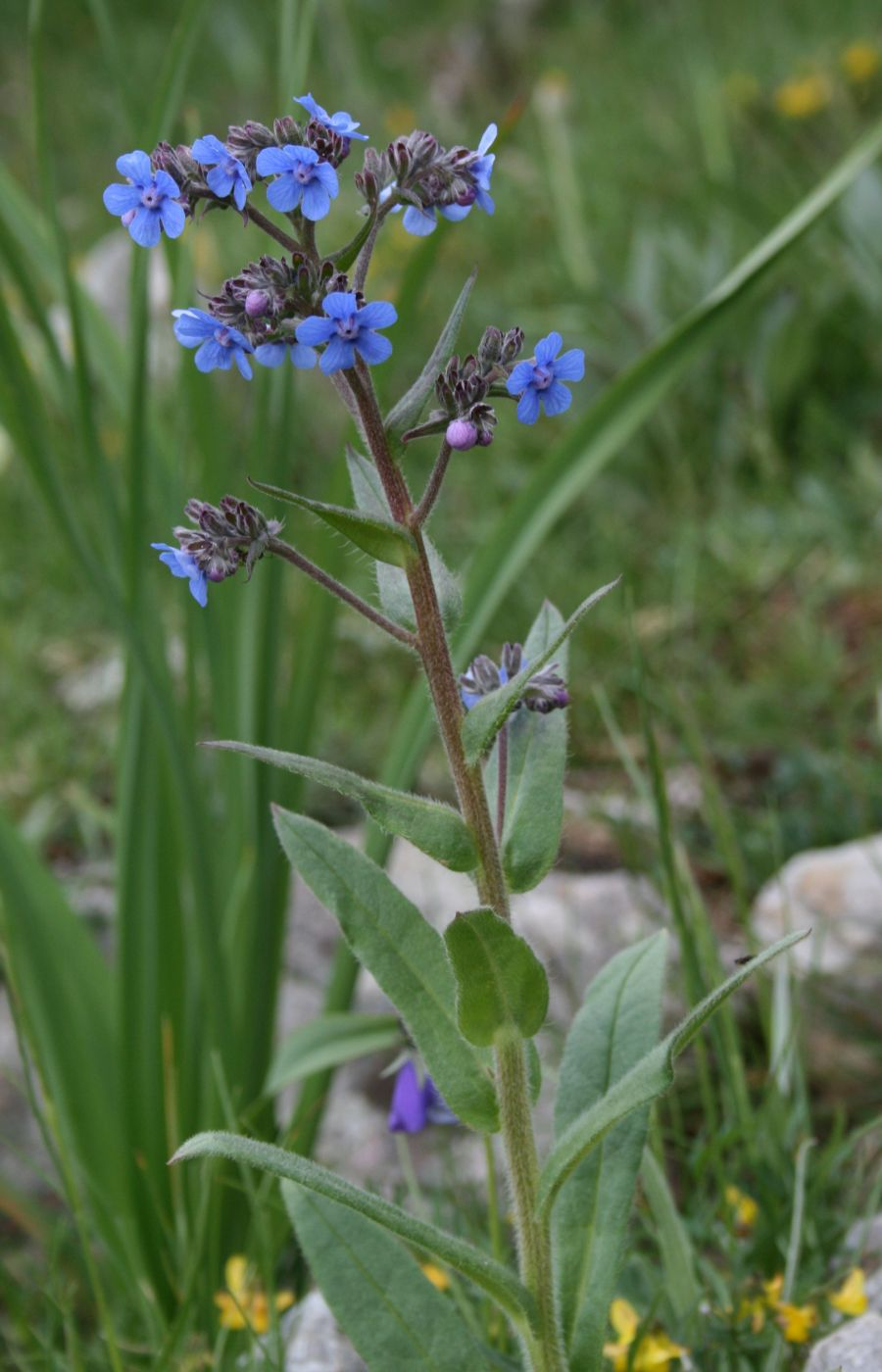
Cynoglottis barrelieri

Cynoglottis is a genus of flowering plants belonging to the family Boraginaceae.

Its native range is southeastern Europe and Western Asia.

Species:

- Cynoglottis barrelieri (All.) Vural & Kit Tan
- Cynoglottis chetikiana Vural & Kit Tan
