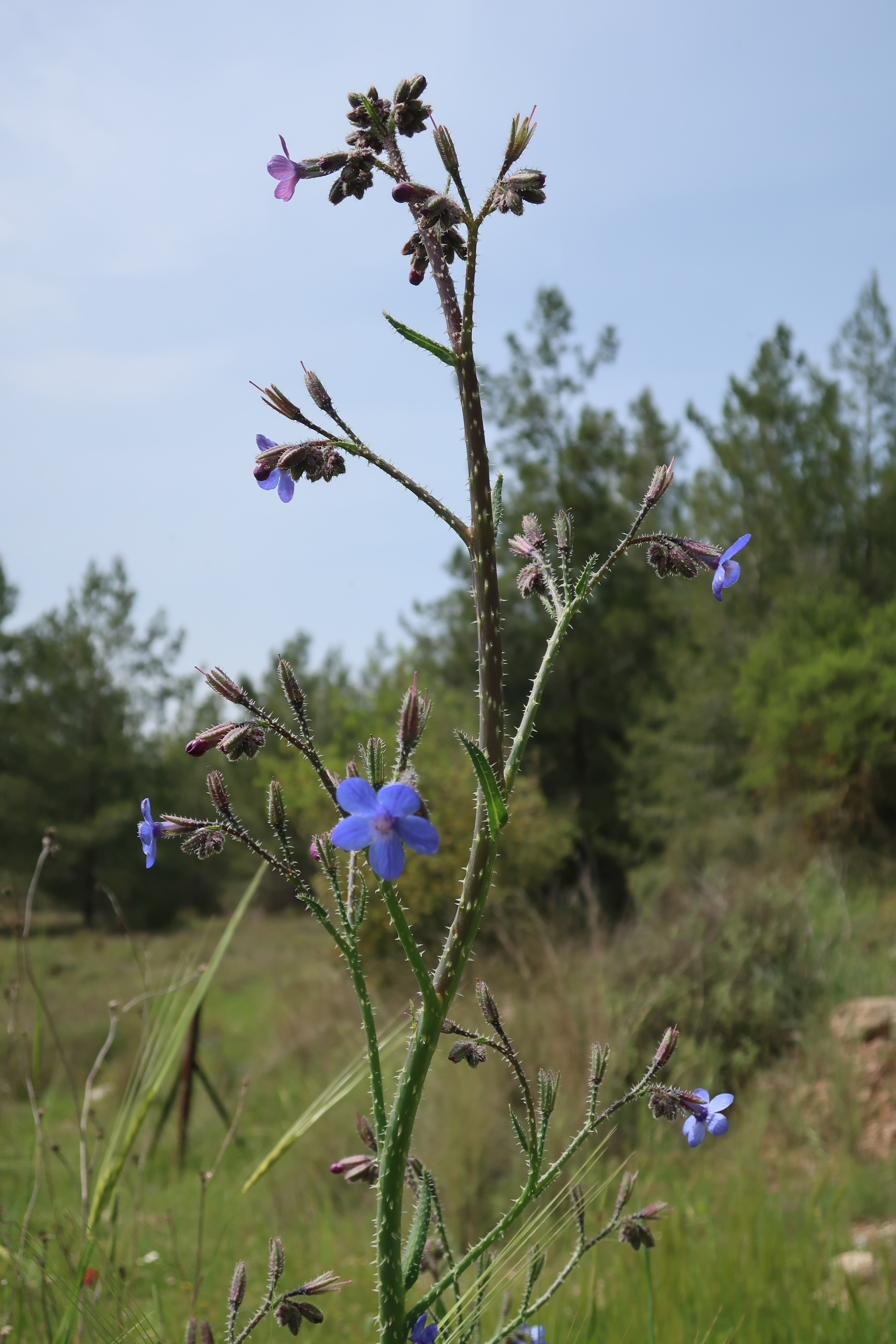

Scientific classification
- Kingdom: Plantae
- Clade: Embryophytes
- Clade: Tracheophytes
- Clade: Spermatophytes
- Clade: Angiosperms
- Clade: Eudicots
- Clade: Asterids
- Order: Boraginales
- Family: Boraginaceae
- Genus: Anchusa
- Species: A. strigosa

Binomial name
- Anchusa strigosa Banks & Sol.

Synonyms
- Anchusa echinata (Lam.); Buglossum echinatum Tausch; Buglossum syriacum Tausch

= Anchusa strigosa =

Species of flowering plant

Anchusa strigosa is a non-succulent species of herbaceous plants in the Boraginaceae family endemic to the Eastern Mediterranean regions, particularly Greece, Cyprus, Turkey, Lebanon, Israel, Jordan, and Iran. It is known widely by its common names of strigose bugloss and prickly alkanet.

== Description ==
Anchusa strigosa is a perennial herb, with a rosette of leaves at its base and an inflorescence stem that rises to a height of 1 metre (3 1/2 ft) or more. The leaves are rough as the tongue of a ruminate.

In winter the plant grows a large rosette of leaves, and in late spring a few inflorescence stems grow from the base of the plant. The petiole is nail-like (9 mm long) and has a narrow tube and a closed pharynx with bristly white scales. The flower is blue, but it is gradually being displacing by a white-flowered variety.

=== Similar species ===
The Italian bugloss is very similar to A. strigosa in as far as its blue flower is concerned, but differs from A. strigosa by its soft hairs which are not prickly. In taste, the cooked tender leaves of the Italian bugloss are preferable to the strigose bugloss, but from the flowers of both species can be made a sweet condiment.

== Etymology ==
The rough leaves gave rise to its Arabic designation (لسان الثور; lisān eth-thawr) and its Hebrew designation (לשון-פר; leshon-par). Both names are a reflection of the word bouglossos, called in Koine Greek: βούγλωσσον, the name given for the same plant and meaning "ox-tongued". The plant grows lean, and is often scraggy, from whence the modern taxonomic name of the species (strigosa) takes its name.

== Distribution and habitat ==
The plant is native to the Old World, namely, the Eastern Mediterranean basin and adjacent Western Asia, growing in heavy soils in semi-steppe shrub lands, shrub-steppes, and in Mediterranean woodlands. In Israel its principal habitat is the transition belt between the Mediterranean coastal region and the arid desert regions, growing along waysides in sandy and chalkstone habitats.

The flowers blossom between March and May in Israel. In Ottoman Palestine, the flower's pollen was harvested by honey bees in the production of honey.

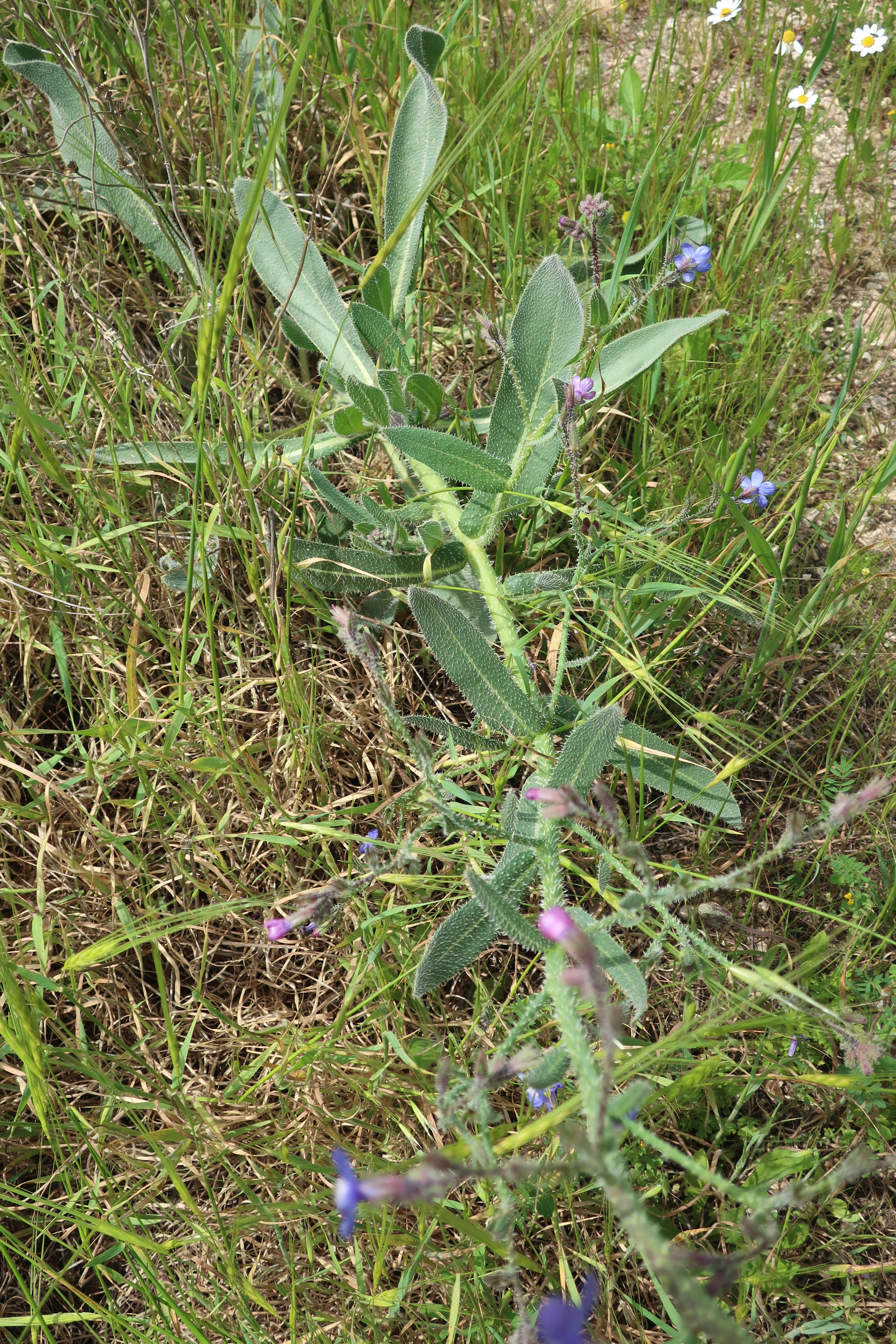
Anchusa strigosa, its prickly leaves and stem, growing laterally along the ground

== Uses ==
The roots of Anchusa (like those of Alkanna and Lithospermum) contain anchusin (or alkanet-red), a red-brown resinoid colouring matter. It is insoluble in water, but soluble in alcohol, chloroform and ether. The red-tinge was used in women's cosmetics as rouge to redden the cheeks.

In some species, the resinoid was collected and used for medicinal purposes. Gustaf Dalman, who conducted geographical and ethnographic research in Palestine in the early 20th-century, heard the plant lisān eth-thōr described to him in the country as being an edible wild herb, and which he applied to A. officinalis, saying that its young leaf growths of spring were collected by some of the indigenous Arab peoples of the land, who then boiled them to be eaten. After boiling, the leaves are finely chopped and sautéed in oil and garlic, and used as a meat garnish or as a viand with eggs.

The Greek physician and botanist Dioscorides (c. 40–90 CE) mentions the medicinal properties of Anchusa (Greek: ἄγχουσα) in his day, adding that "the ointment makers use the root for thickening ointments." Burns and skin lesions can be cured with an ointment prepared from crushed leaves of the plant with the addition of olive oil. The Jewish philosopher and physician, Maimonides (1138–1204 CE), recalls the genera Lingua Bovina ("ox-tongue") in his Guide to Good Health (Regimen Sanitatis), saying that it is "a proven light drug used in compound decoctions", after its leaves were dried, ground into a powder, and infused in hot water.
