= Epascestria euprepialis =

Scientific classification
- Kingdom: Animalia
- Phylum: Arthropoda
- Class: Insecta
- Order: Lepidoptera
- Family: Crambidae
- Genus: Epascestria
- Species: E. euprepialis

Binomial name
- Epascestria euprepialis (Hampson, 1913)

Synonyms
- Phlyctaenodes euprepialis Hampson, 1913; Phlyctaenodes iotaenialis Gaede, 1917

Species of moth

Epascestria euprepialis is a moth in the family Crambidae. It was described by George Hampson in 1913. It is found in South Africa and Zimbabwe.
