= Epascestria distictalis =

Scientific classification
- Kingdom: Animalia
- Phylum: Arthropoda
- Class: Insecta
- Order: Lepidoptera
- Family: Crambidae
- Genus: Epascestria
- Species: E. distictalis

Binomial name
- Epascestria distictalis (Hampson, 1913)

Synonyms
- Phlyctaenodes distictalis Hampson, 1913

Species of moth

Epascestria distictalis is a moth in the family Crambidae. It was described by George Hampson in 1913. It is found in Lesotho.
