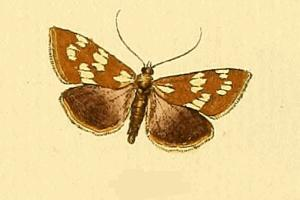
- Epascestria pustulalis

Scientific classification
- Domain: Eukaryota
- Kingdom: Animalia
- Phylum: Arthropoda
- Class: Insecta
- Order: Lepidoptera
- Family: Crambidae
- Tribe: Odontiini
- Genus: Epascestria; Hübner, 1825

Synonyms
- Epacestria Marion, 1957; Phlyctaenodes Guenée, 1854; Phlyctoenodes Le Cerf, 1910

= Epascestria =

Genus of moths

Epascestria is a genus of moths of the family Crambidae.

== Species ==
- Epascestria croesusalis (Hampson, 1913)
- Epascestria distictalis (Hampson, 1913)
- Epascestria euprepialis (Hampson, 1913)
- Epascestria pictalis (Hampson, 1913)
- Epascestria pustulalis (Hübner, 1823)

== Former species ==
- Epascestria microdontalis (Hampson, 1913)
