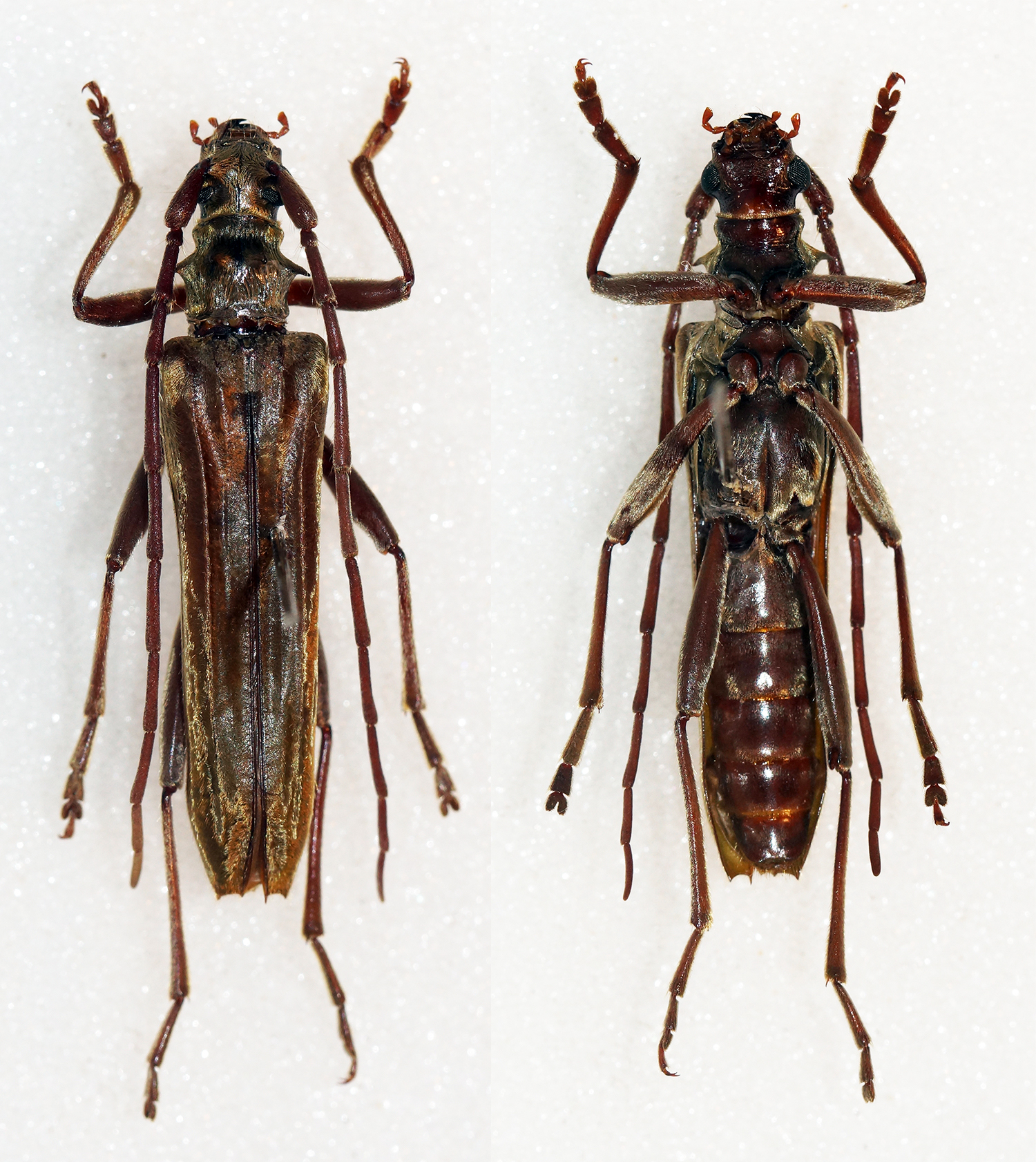

Scientific classification
- Kingdom: Animalia
- Phylum: Arthropoda
- Class: Insecta
- Order: Coleoptera
- Suborder: Polyphaga
- Infraorder: Cucujiformia
- Family: Cerambycidae
- Genus: Parasemnus; Martins, 1998
- Species: P. regalis

Binomial name
- Parasemnus regalis Germain, 1894

= Parasemnus =

Genus of beetle

Parasemnus is a genus of longhorn beetles in the family Cerambycidae, and contains the single species Parasemnus regalis. It is endemic to the central regions of Chile, and was first described in 1894 by Philbert Germain.
