= Phyllocara =

Scientific classification
- Kingdom: Plantae
- Clade: Tracheophytes
- Clade: Angiosperms
- Clade: Eudicots
- Clade: Asterids
- Order: Boraginales
- Family: Boraginaceae
- Genus: Phyllocara; Guşul. (1927)
- Species: P. aucheri

Binomial name
- Phyllocara aucheri (A.DC.) Guşul. (1927)

Synonyms
- Anchusa aucheri A.DC. (1846); Anchusa hyalotricha Boiss. (1875)

Genus of flowering plants

Phyllocara aucheri is a species of flowering plant in the family Boraginaceae, the sole species in genus Phyllocara. It is an annual native to western Asia, including the Eastern Mediterranean (Turkey and Cyprus to Sinai), Iraq, Iran and the Caucasus.
