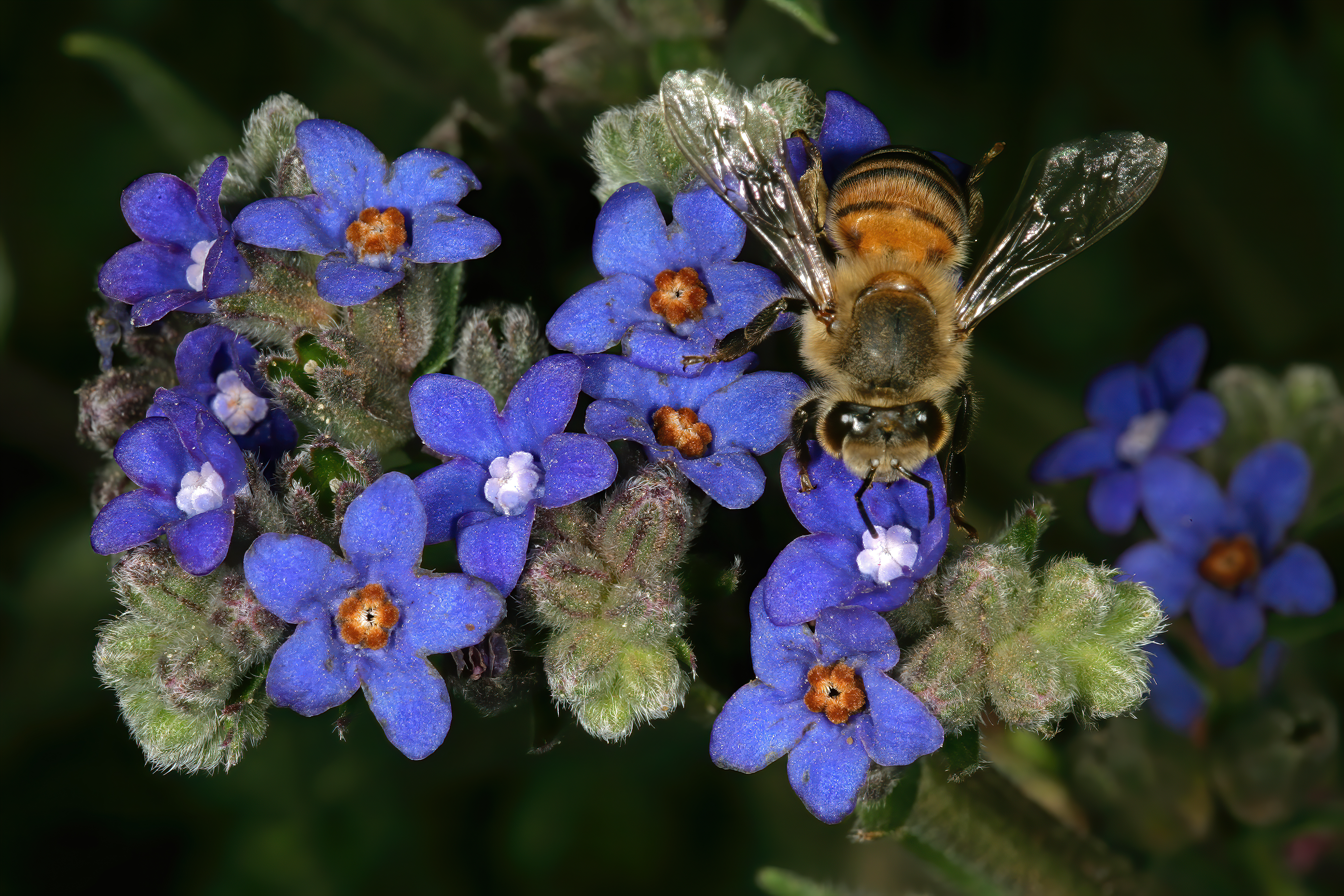
- Close-up of flowers with bee for scale
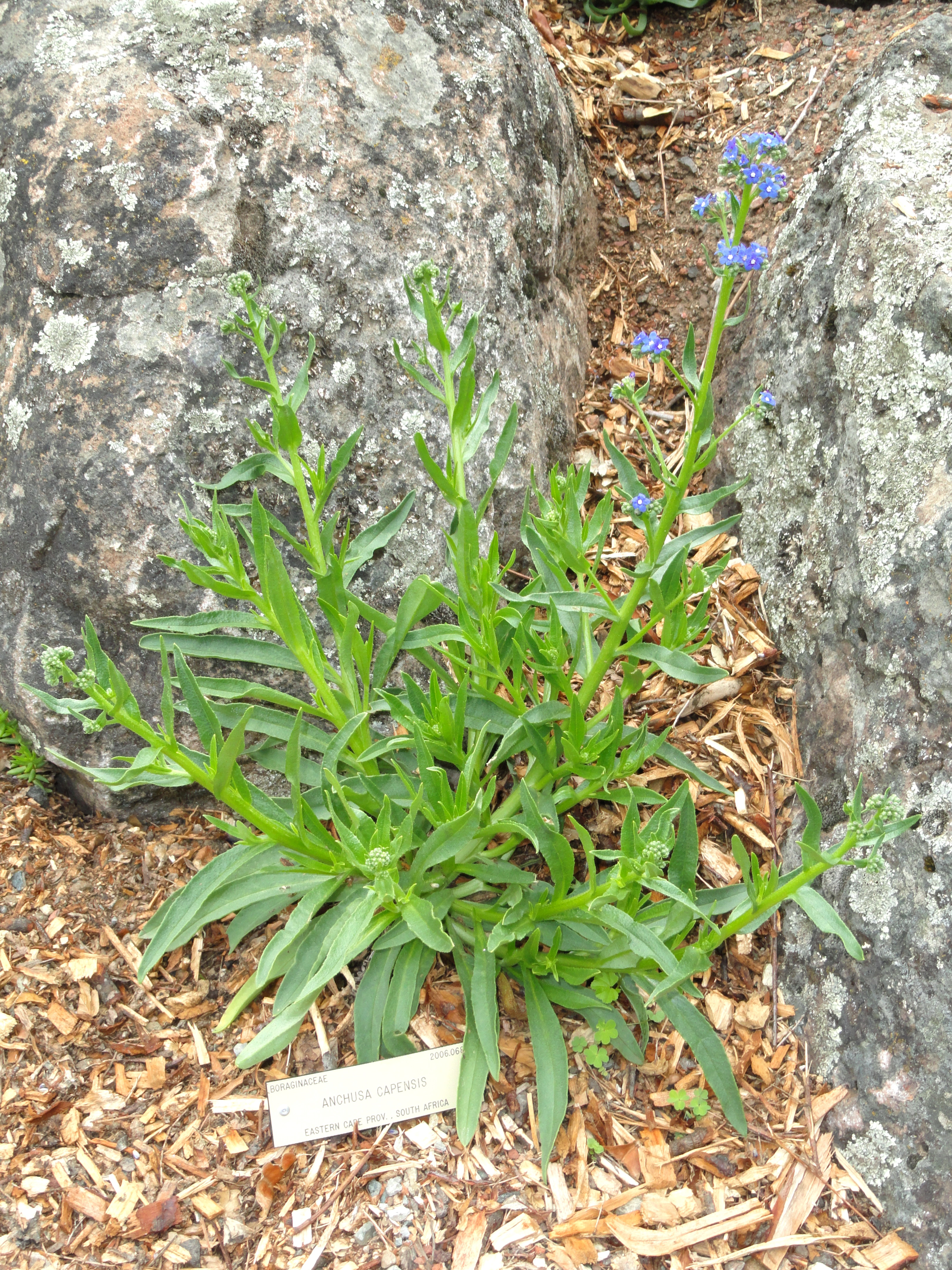
- At the University of California Botanical Garden

Scientific classification
- Kingdom: Plantae
- Clade: Embryophytes
- Clade: Tracheophytes
- Clade: Spermatophytes
- Clade: Angiosperms
- Clade: Eudicots
- Clade: Asterids
- Order: Boraginales
- Family: Boraginaceae
- Genus: Anchusa
- Species: A. capensis

Binomial name
- Anchusa capensis Thunb.

= Anchusa capensis =

Species of flowering plant

Anchusa capensis, is a species of flowering plant in the family Boraginaceae, native to Namibia, South Africa and Lesotho. The genus Anchusa is from the Greek word anchousa, which makes reference to its use as a dye base for cosmetic paint obtained from the roots of another plant in the genus Anchusa tinctoria. The species capensis translates to 'from the Cape' referring to South Africa

A. capensis typically reaches about 60 cm (24 in) tall, and grows best in full sun. In summer, red buds open to reveal small, bright cobalt blue flowers with five petals and five white scales protecting the stigma and anthers.

In the US, it grows well in zones 8–11. Cultivars include 'Dawn', with white, pink, mauve and blue flowers, 'Blue Angel', with dark blue flowers, and 'Blue Bird', taller and with indigo blue flowers.

== Common Names ==
- Bugloss
- Cape Forget-Me Not
- Summer Forget-Me Not
- Vergeet-My-Nietjie
- Ystergras
- Koringblom
- Ossetongblaar (Afr.)
- Petlekheme (Sesotho)
- Alkanet
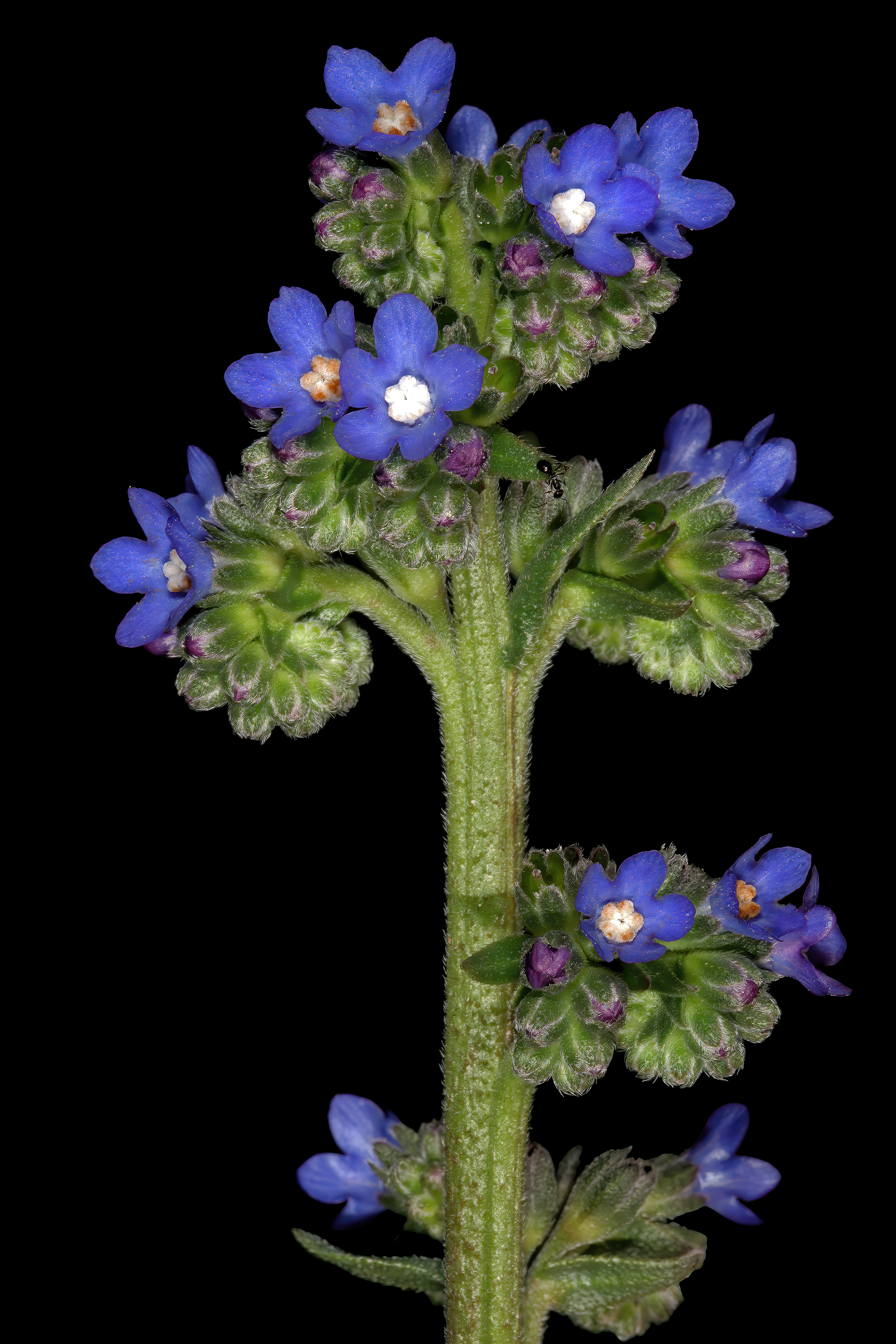
Inflorescence

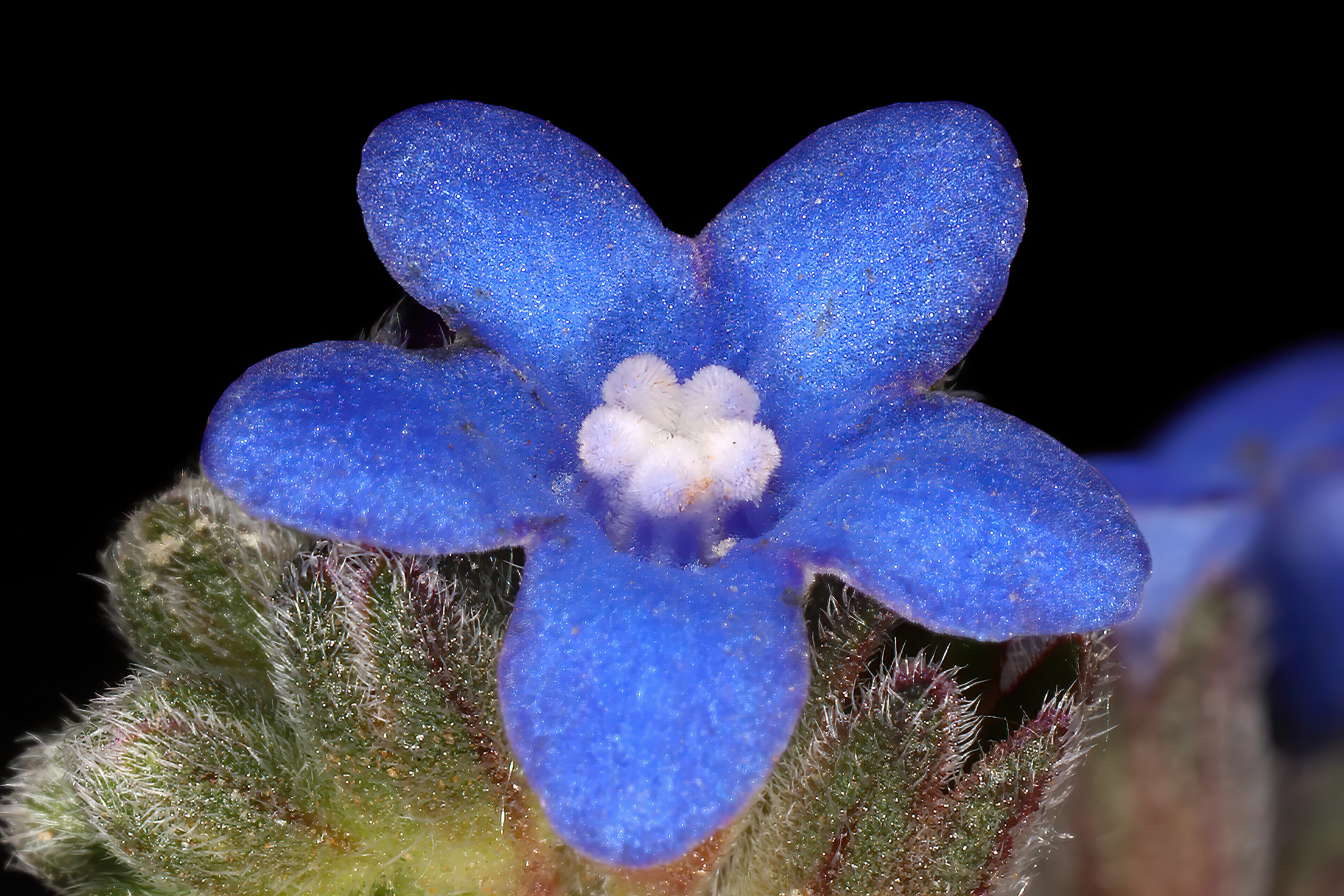
Extreme close-up of flower

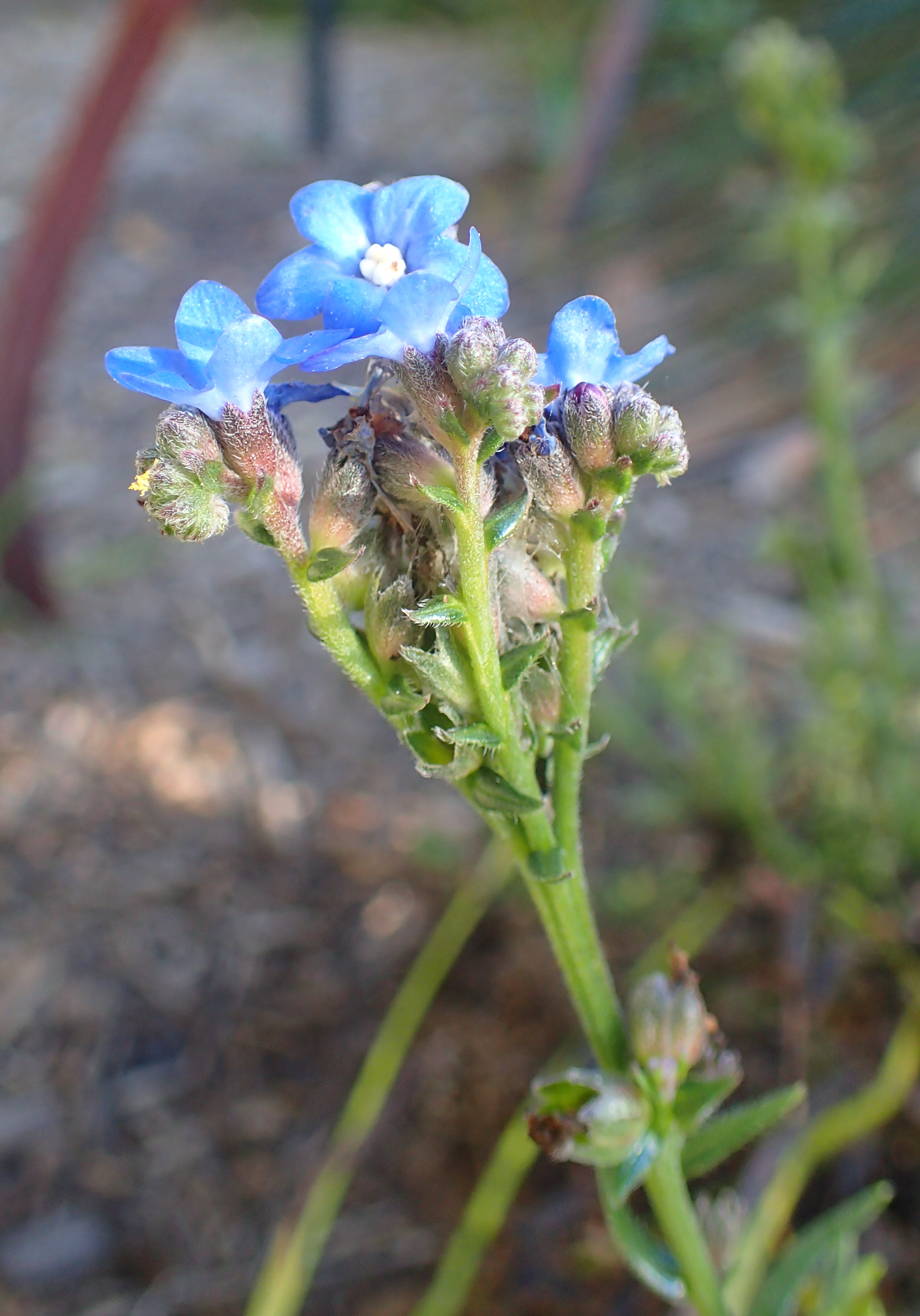
At the San Francisco Botanical Garden

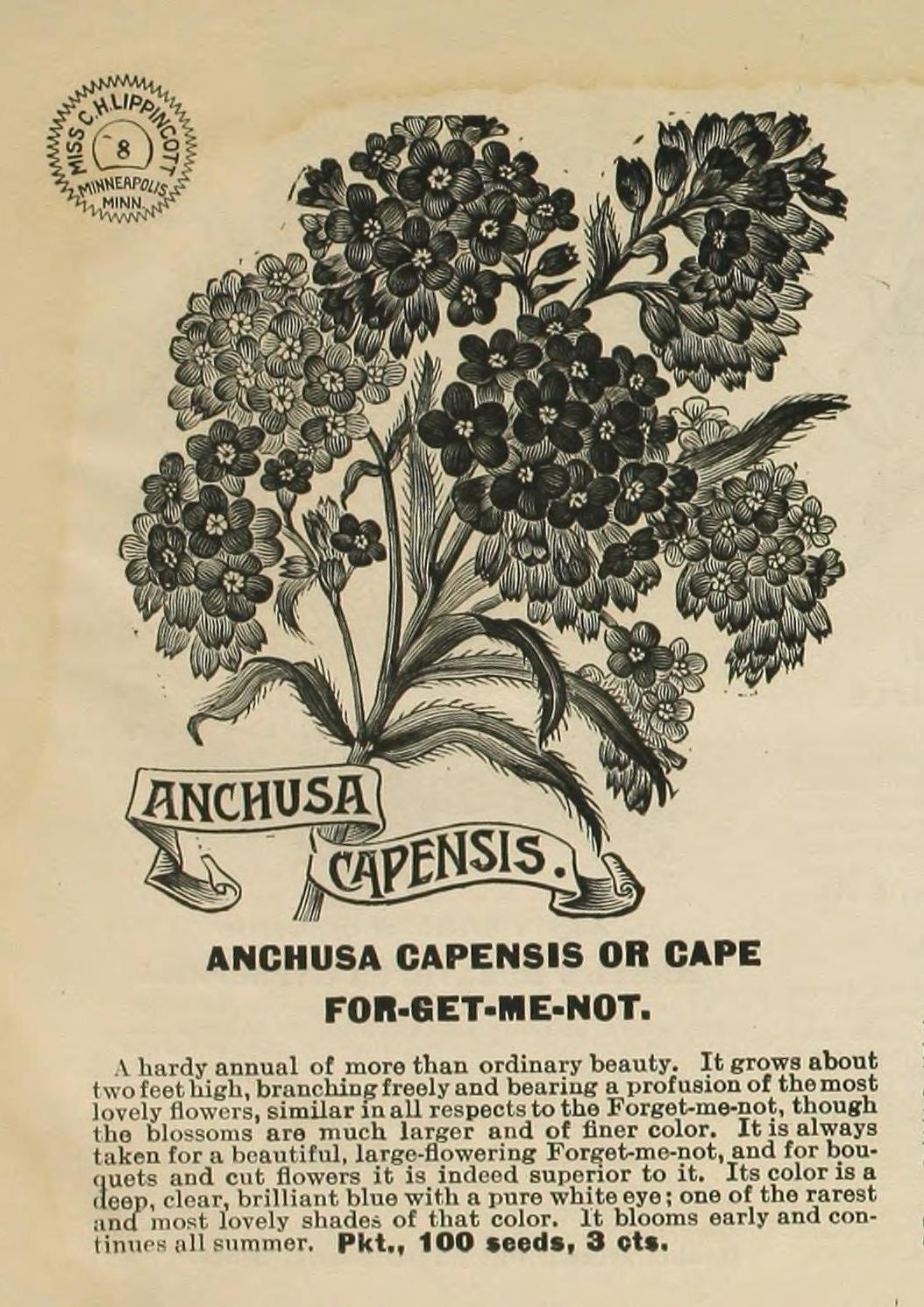
From Miss C.H. Lippincott seed catalog, 1894
