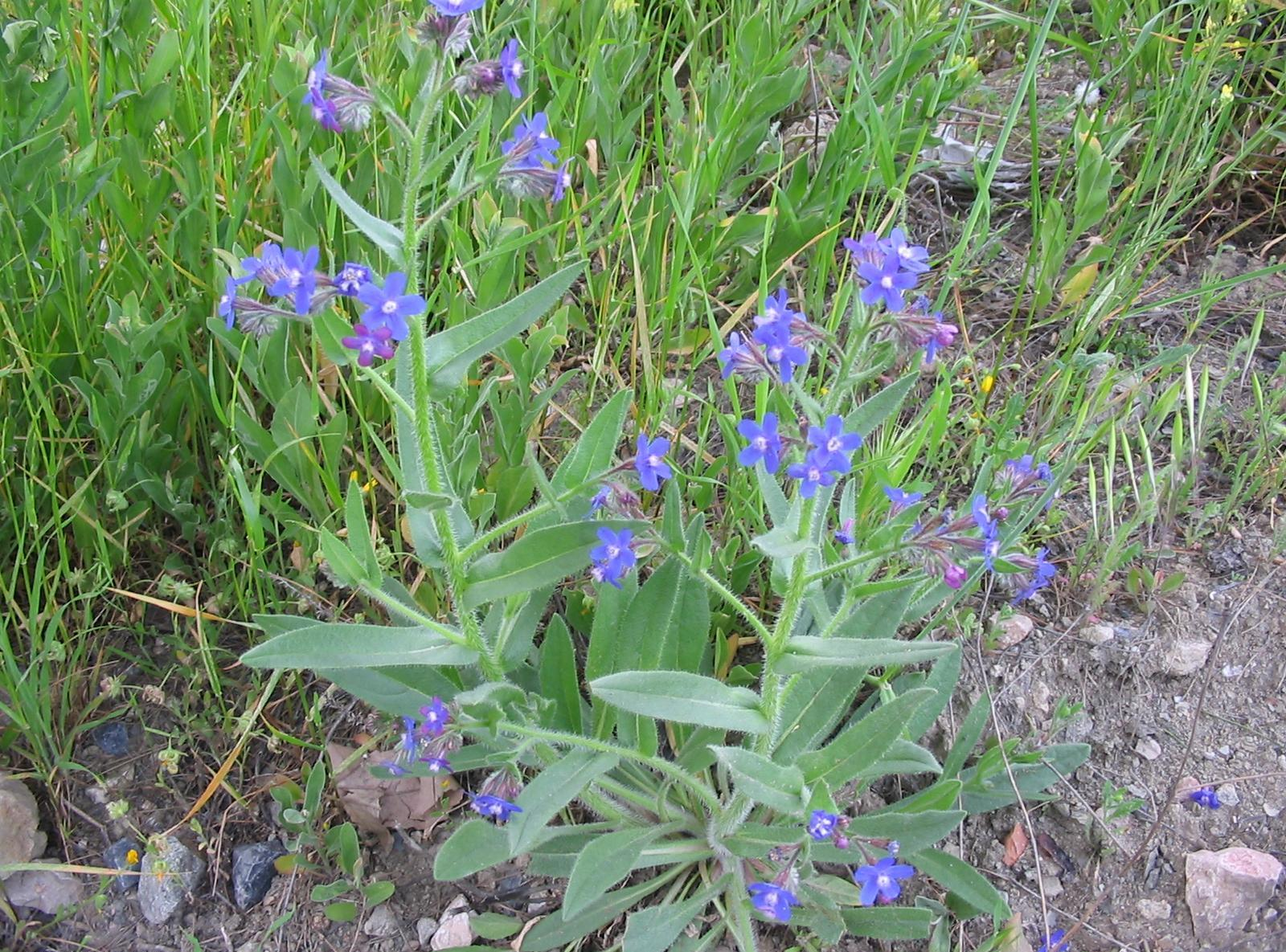

Scientific classification
- Kingdom: Plantae
- Clade: Tracheophytes
- Clade: Angiosperms
- Clade: Eudicots
- Clade: Asterids
- Order: Boraginales
- Family: Boraginaceae
- Genus: Anchusa
- Species: A. azurea

Binomial name
- Anchusa azurea Mill.

Synonyms
- Anchusa italica

= Anchusa azurea =

Species of flowering plant

Anchusa azurea is a species of flowering plant in the family Boraginaceae, known by the common names garden anchusa and Italian bugloss (or just "bugloss"). This bristly herbaceous perennial may reach 1.5 m (4.9 ft) tall and 60 cm (24 in) wide. It has straight lance-shaped leaves and petite tubular flowers about 15 millimeters across with five bright violet-blue petals. These flowers, which typically appear in May–July, are edible and attract bees. This species is native to Europe, western Asia, and eastern Maghreb.

The genus name Anchusa comes from the Greek 'ankousa', which is the name of a root pigment once used for cosmetic purposes.

Numerous cultivars have been developed for garden use, including 'Dropmore', 'Feltham Pride', 'Little John', 'Loddon Royalist' and 'Opal'.

In the US it is suitable for hardiness zones 3–8. It grows best in full sun with good drainage, and is drought tolerant once established. It may be susceptible to leafminer and powdery mildew.

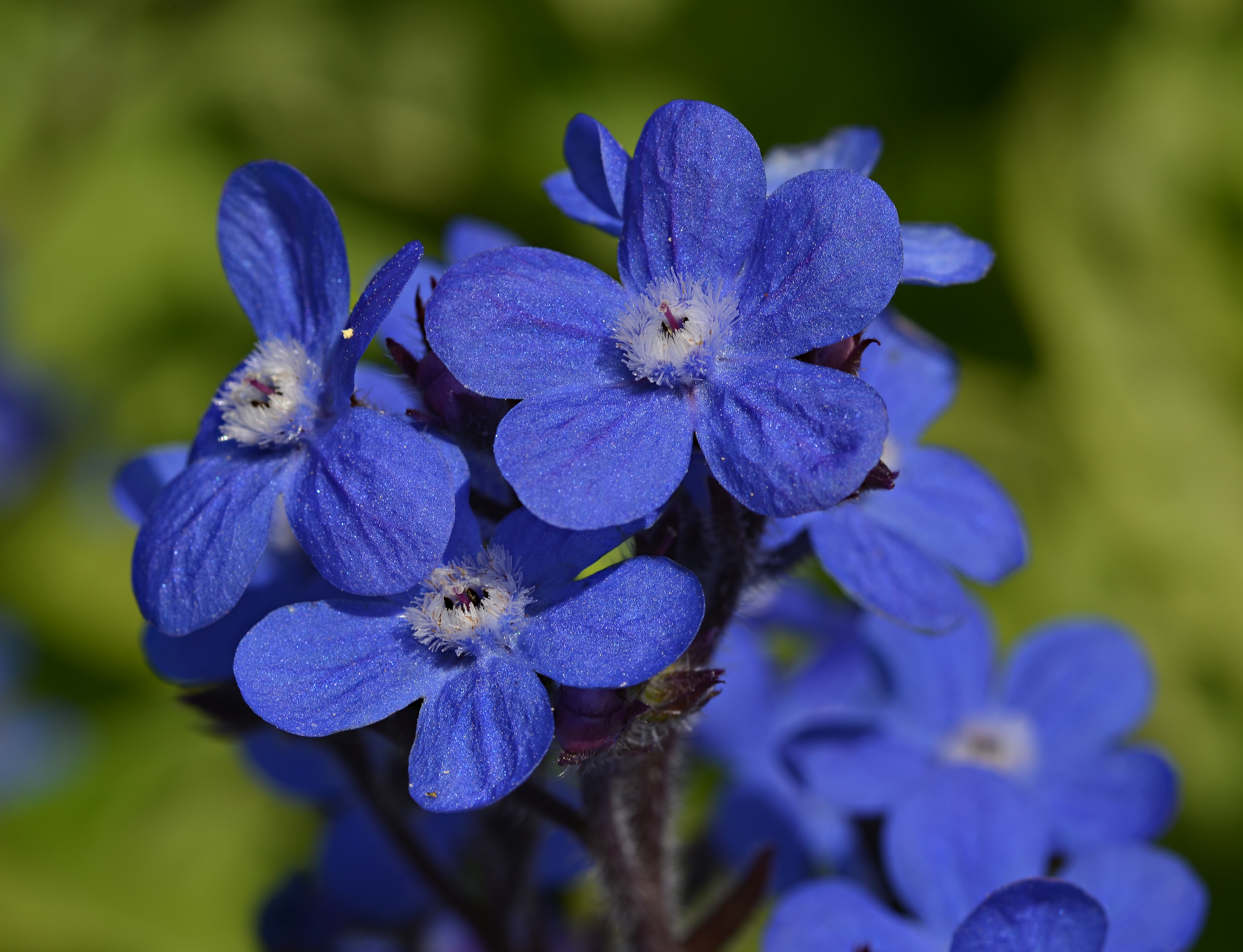

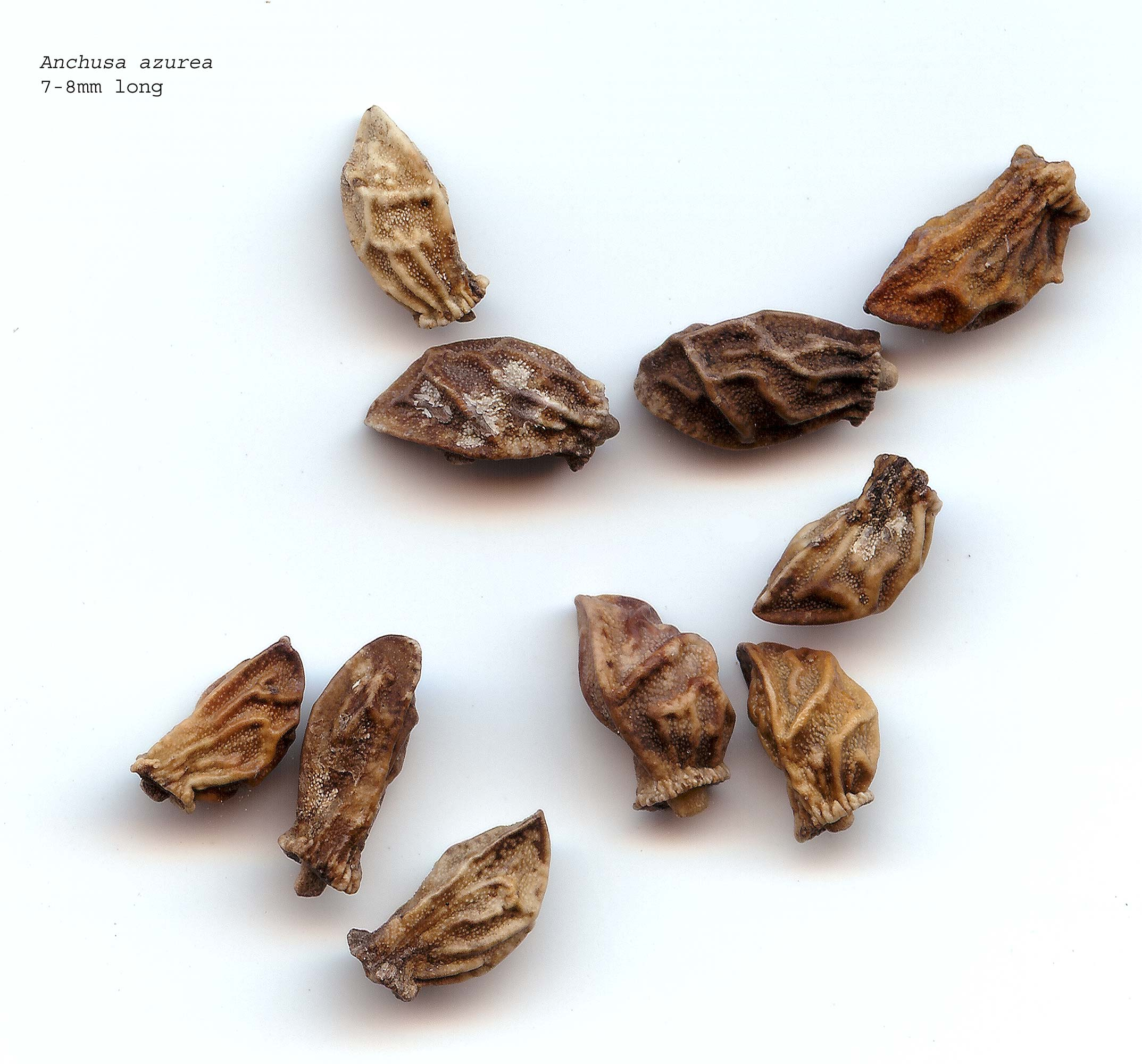
