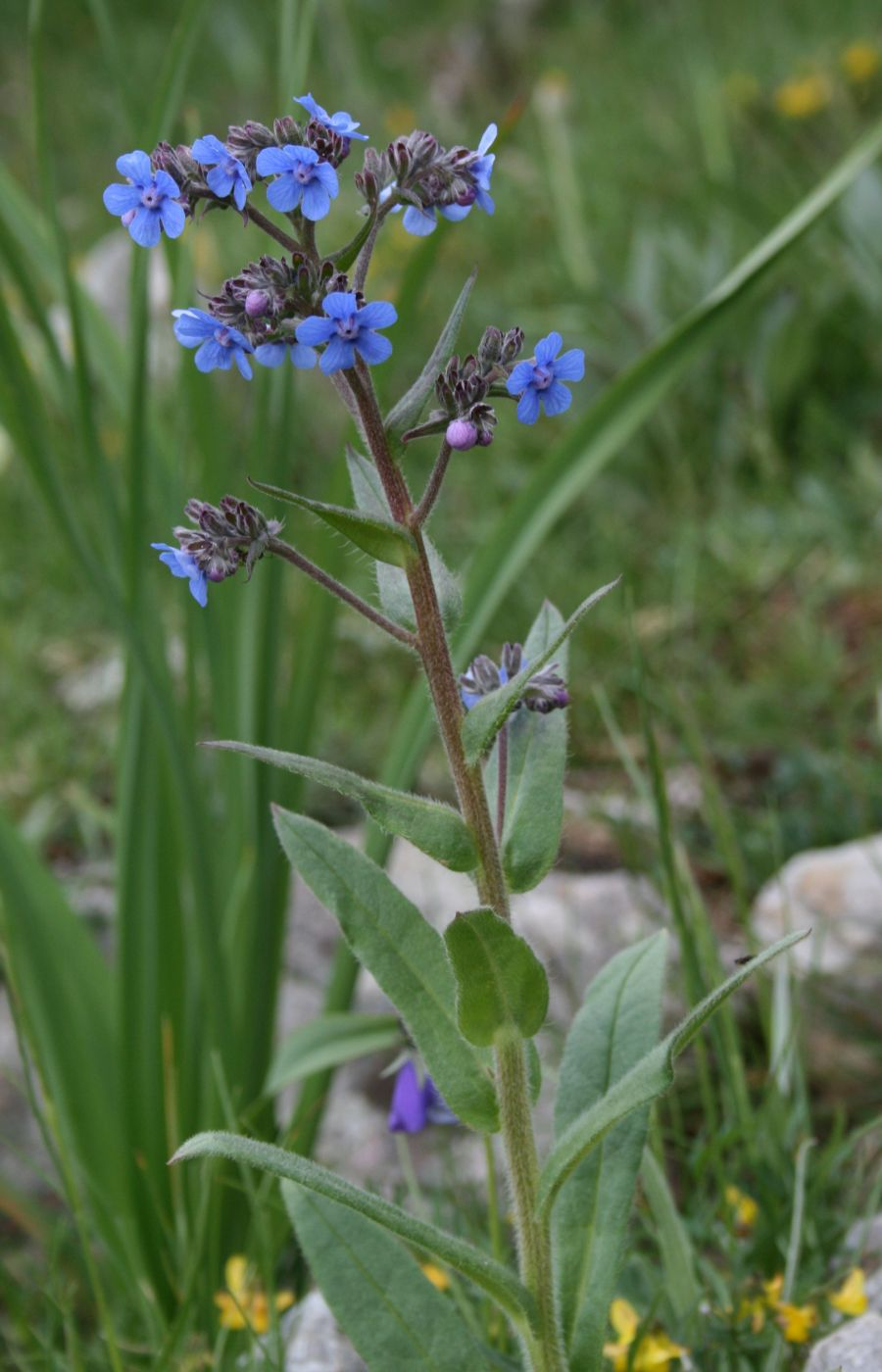

Scientific classification
- Kingdom: Plantae
- Clade: Tracheophytes
- Clade: Angiosperms
- Clade: Eudicots
- Clade: Asterids
- Order: Boraginales
- Family: Boraginaceae
- Genus: Cynoglottis
- Species: C. barrelieri

Binomial name
- Cynoglottis barrelieri (All.) Vural & Kit Tan (1983)

Subspecies
- Cynoglottis barrelieri subsp. barrelieri; Cynoglottis barrelieri subsp. longisepala (T.Georgiev & Kitan.) Ančev & Valdés; Cynoglottis barrelieri subsp. serpentinicola (Rech.f.) Vural & Kit Tan

Synonyms
- Anchusa barrelieri (All.) Vitman (1789); Buglossum barrelieri All. (1785)

= Cynoglottis barrelieri =

Barrelier's bugloss

Species of flowering plant

Cynoglottis barrelieri, Barrelier's bugloss or false alkanet, is a species of flowering plant in the Boraginaceae family. It is a perennial native to southeastern Europe (Italy, the Balkan Peninsula, and Hungary), Crimea, Turkey, Lebanon, and Syria. It is sometimes used as an ornamental plant.

== Subspecies ==
Three subspecies are accepted.

- Cynoglottis barrelieri subsp. barrelieri – Italy, Balkan Peninsula, Hungary, Crimea, Lebanon, and Syria
- Cynoglottis barrelieri subsp. longisepala (T.Georgiev & Kitan.) Ančev & Valdés – Bulgaria
- Cynoglottis barrelieri subsp. serpentinicola (Rech.f.) Vural & Kit Tan (synonyms Anchusa serpentinicola Rech.f. and Cynoglottis serpentinicola (Rech.f.) Holub) – North Macedonia, northeastern Greece, and Asiatic Turkey
