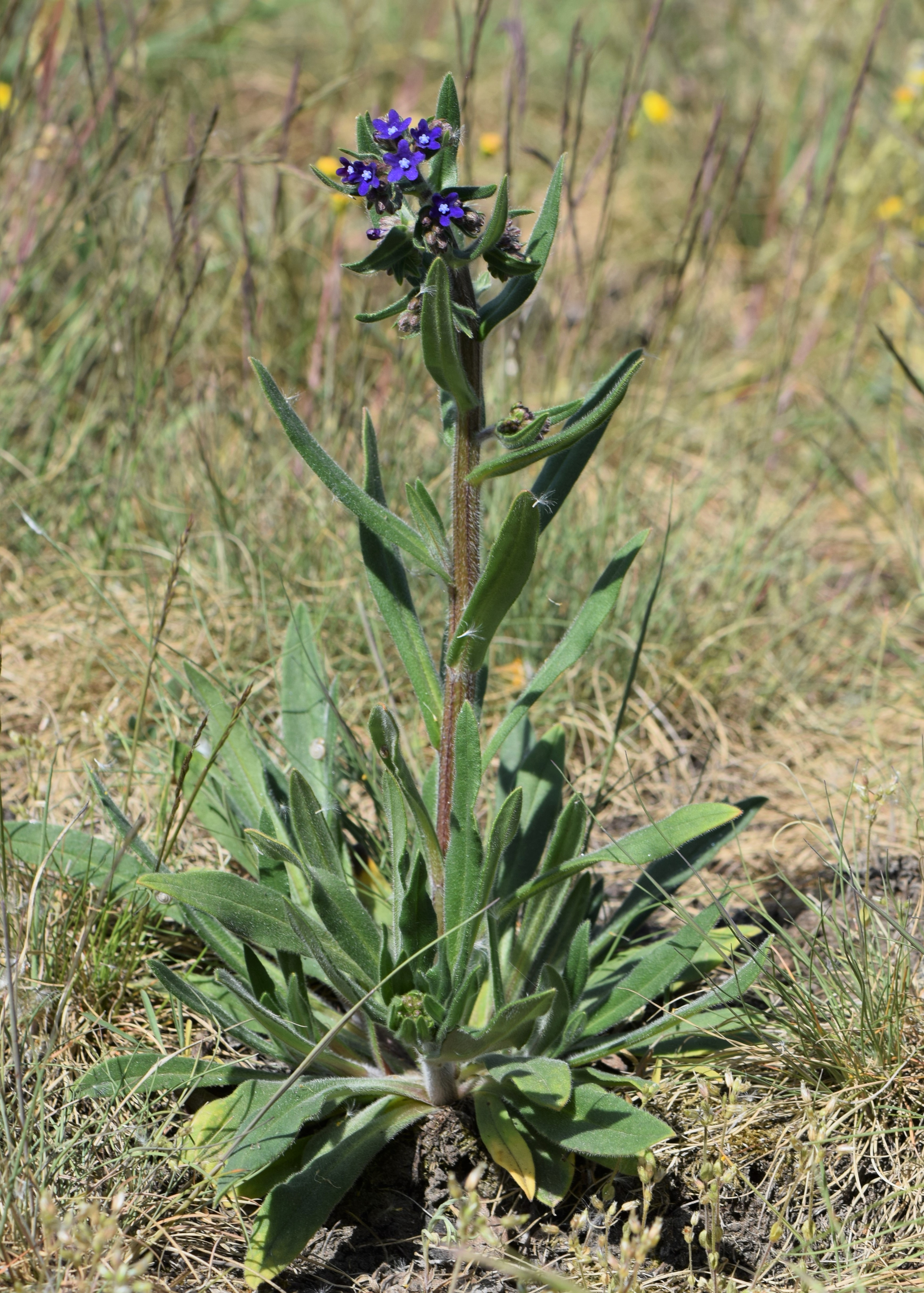

Scientific classification
- Kingdom: Plantae
- Clade: Embryophytes
- Clade: Tracheophytes
- Clade: Angiosperms
- Clade: Eudicots
- Clade: Asterids
- Order: Boraginales
- Family: Boraginaceae
- Genus: Anchusa
- Species: A. officinalis

Binomial name
- Anchusa officinalis L.

Subspecies
- Anchusa officinalis subsp. intacta (Griseb.) Selvi & Bigazzi; Anchusa officinalis subsp. officinalis

Synonyms
- List: Anchusa angustifolia L.; Anchusa arvalis Rchb.; Anchusa davidovii Stoj.; Anchusa incarnata Schrad. ex Steud.; Anchusa leptophylla W.D.J.Koch; Anchusa lycopsidis Besser ex Link; Anchusa macedonica Velen.; Anchusa macrocalyx Hausskn.; Anchusa maculata Hornem. ex Steud.; Anchusa microcalyx Vis.; Anchusa moesiaca Velen.; Anchusa ochroleuca Baumg.; Anchusa officinalis var. alba Gray; Anchusa officinalis subsp. angustifolia (L.) Bjelcic; Anchusa officinalis var. angustifolia (L.) Lej.; Anchusa officinalis var. angustior Hartm.; Anchusa officinalis var. arvalis (Rchb.) Rouy; Anchusa officinalis var. brachyantha Regel; Anchusa officinalis var. glabrescens Wimm. & Grab.; Anchusa officinalis var. hirsuta Wimm. & Grab.; Anchusa officinalis var. hispida Wimm. & Grab.; Anchusa officinalis var. incarnata Gray; Anchusa officinalis subvar. intacta (Griseb.) Guşul.; Anchusa officinalis var. longiflora Griseb.; Anchusa officinalis var. macrantha H.Post; Anchusa officinalis var. minor Gaudin; Anchusa officinalis var. moesiaca (Velen.) Guşul.; Anchusa officinalis f. roseiflora H.Post; Anchusa officinalis f. undulatifolia Wimm. & Grab.; Anchusa officinalis var. velenovskyi Guşul.; Anchusa osmanica Velen.; Anchusa pustulata Schur; Anchusa spicata Lam.; Anchusa tinctoria Woodv.; Anchusa undulata var. intacta Griseb.; Anchusa velenovskyi (Guşul.) Stoj.; Anchusa velenovskyi var. stojanovii St.Kozhukharov; Buglossum angustifolium (L.) Moench; Buglossum aspermum Gilib.; Buglossum officinale Lam.

= Anchusa officinalis =

Species of flowering plant

Anchusa officinalis, also knowns as common bugloss or common alkanet, is a species of flowering plant in the borage family. It is native to Europe and small parts of western Asia, but has been escaped from cultivation to grow in additional locations in Europe and the Americas. The flowers are noted for their popularity with bumblebees due to a large nectar flow. The plants have been used in traditional medicines, but were falling out of favor by the early 1800s. They are still planted in gardens for their popularity with bees and their blue flowers.

== Description ==
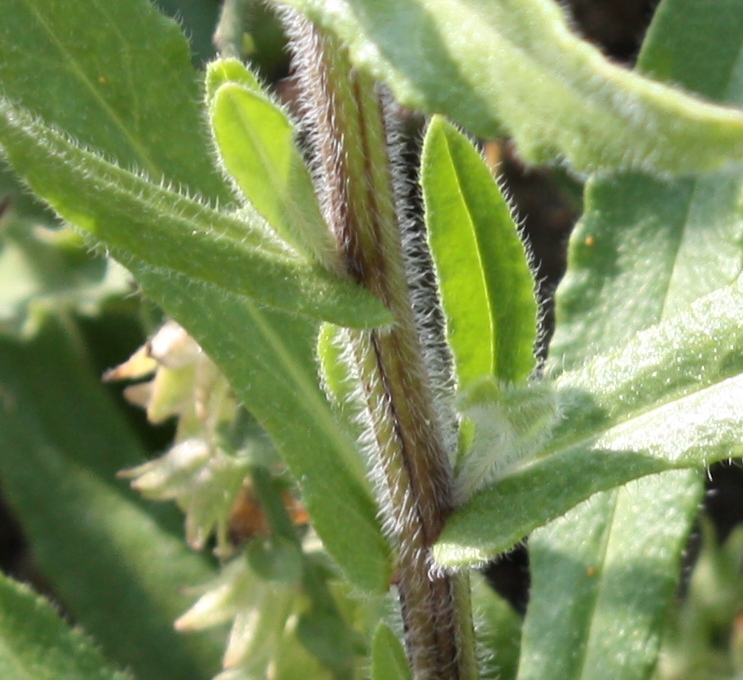
The hairy stems of Anchusa officinalis

This herbaceous plant with well developed stems most often grows 40 to 70 centimeters (16 to 28 in) tall, but may reach 100 centimeters (39 in) tall in ideal conditions. It may be an annual, biennial, or perennial. The whole of the plant is covered in short, coarse hairs. Plants have a strong taproot that may be as long as one meter.

Bugloss has leaves that are shaped like a narrow spear head (lance-linear), with the widest portion in the middle and tapering towards both ends. Leaves located lower down on the stems have their own leaf stems while those towards the ends of the stems have bases that clasp the stem. Leaves are arranged alternately on the stem. The length of the leaves is 6–20 centimeters (2.4–7.9 in) and the width is 1–2.5 centimeters.

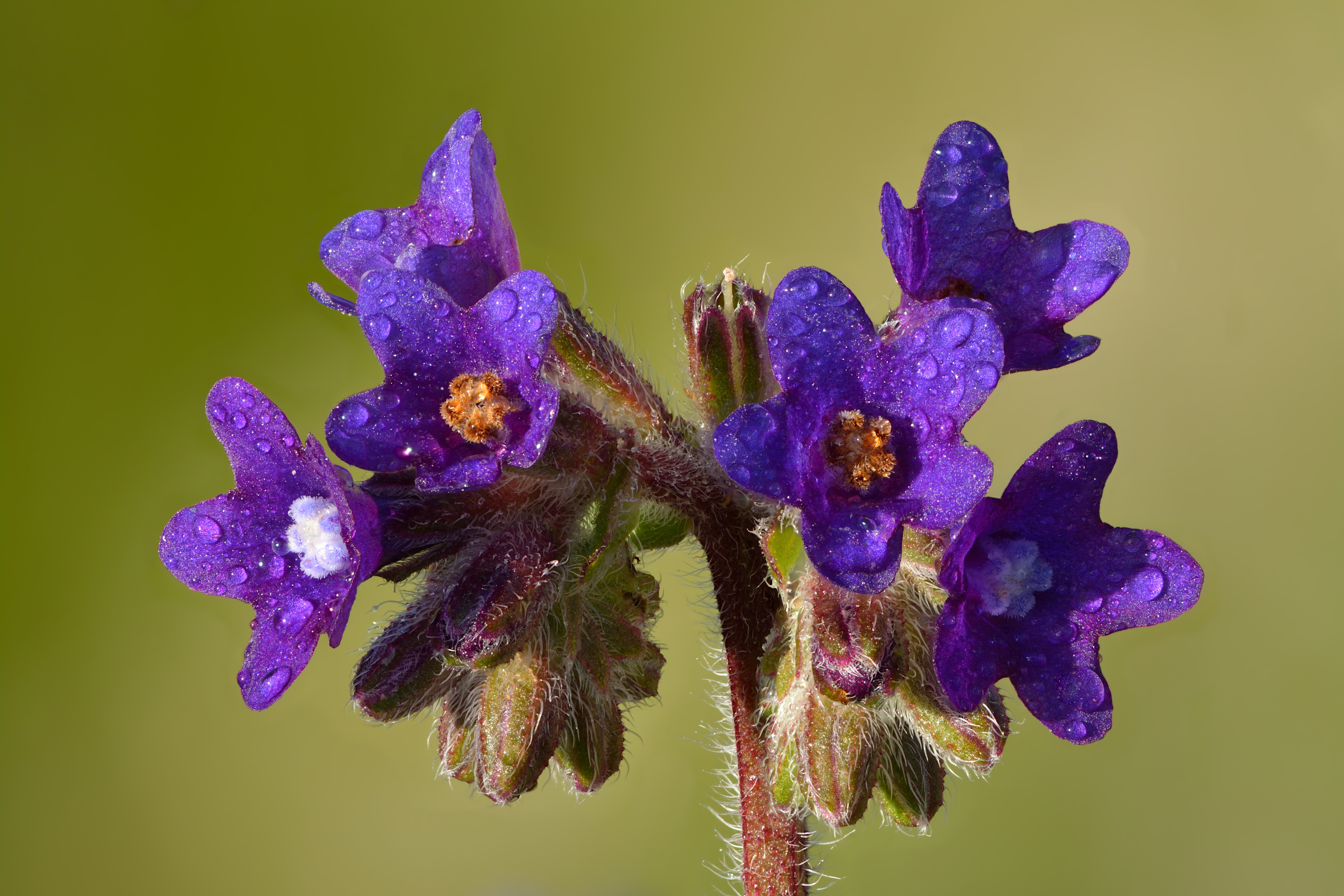
Anchusa officinalis flowers

The flowering clusters (cymes) at the ends of the stems are densely packed with blooms along one side of the stem. When new the flowers are dark pink or crimson in color and typically become dark purple-blue with a white center as they age. However, they may also be violet, reddish, white, or yellowish in color. The fused petals (the corolla) are 6–11 millimeters long and 6–11 millimeters wide. When blooming the sepals (calyx) may be 5–7 millimeters long, but they persist into fruiting and become 8–12 millimeters long. The white center of the flowers are scales that close the throat of the flower. The flowering season is from June until August in Europe.

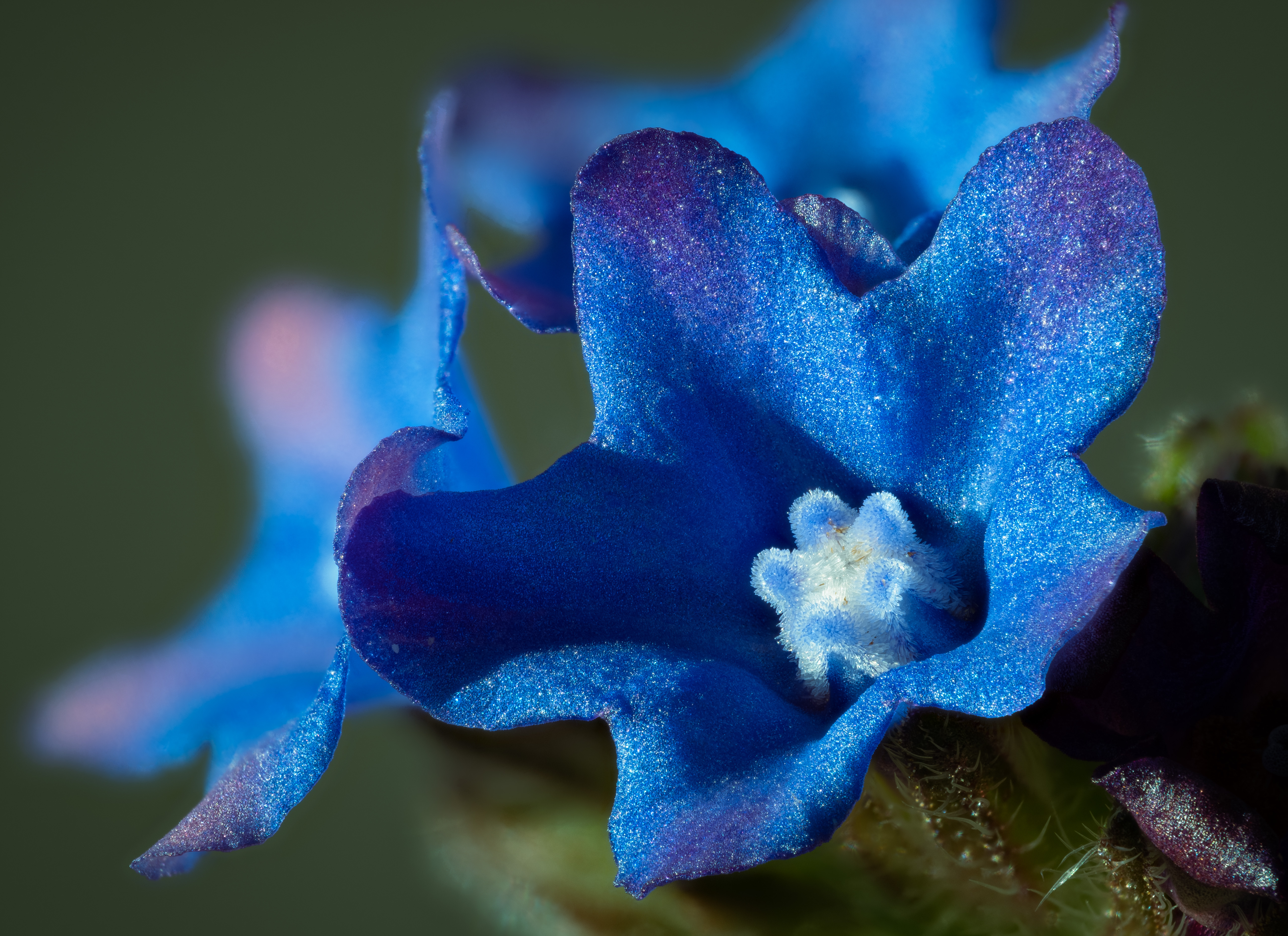
Anchusa officinalis flower close up

The fruit is called a nutlet, the hardened lobed ovary of the plant. Each is 2 millimeters wide by about 3–4 millimeters long. Each fruit may have up to four seeds, but will usually have fewer. The flowers are self-incompatible and dependent on the services of pollinators to accomplish good seed set. Seeds may be produced from August to October.

=== Chemistry ===
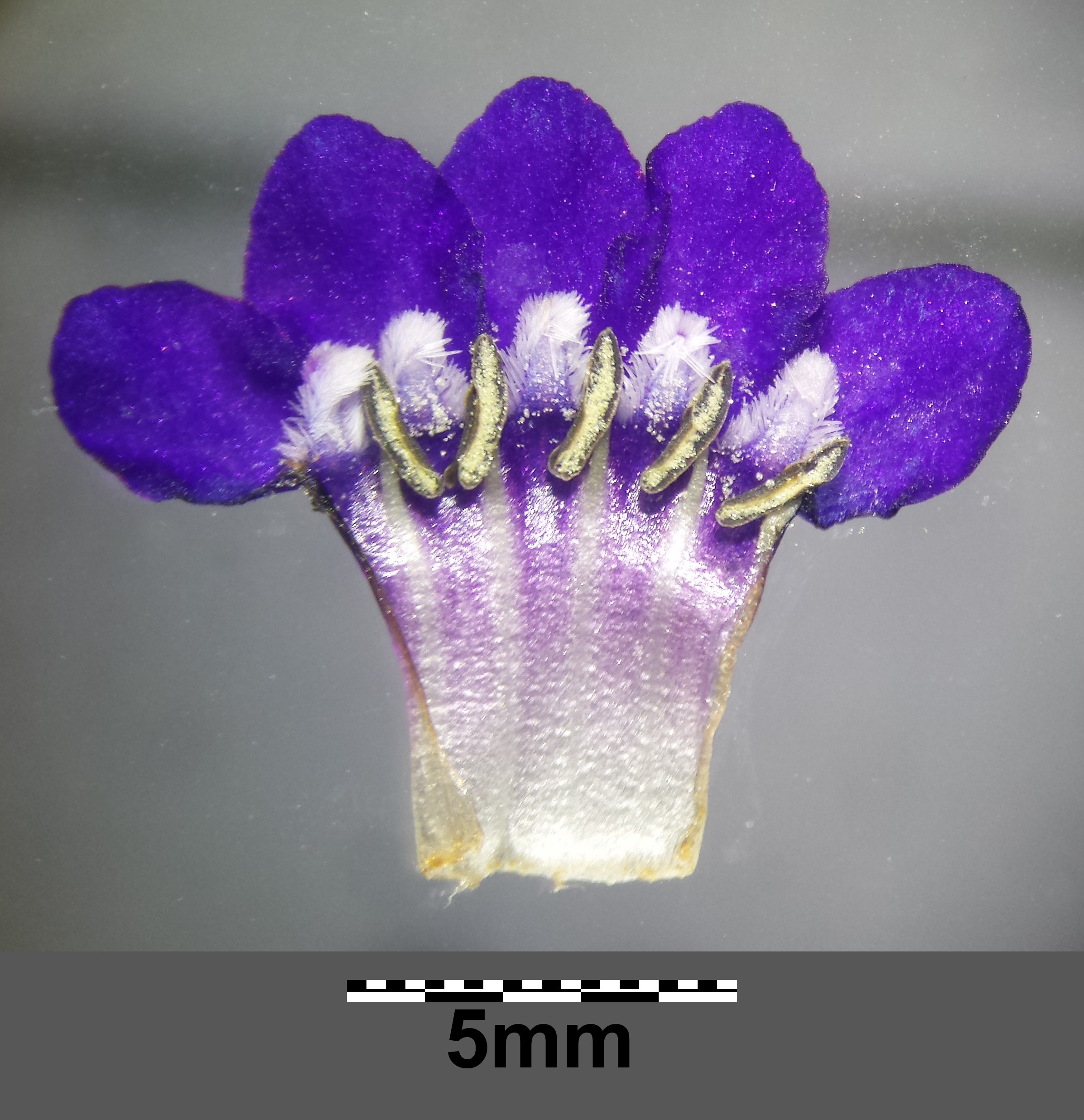
Flower, disected and opened to show internal structure

The most common plant chemicals found in common bugloss are ones derived from phenolic acid. Specific compounds include p-Coumaric acid, danshensu, caffeic acid, neochlorogenic acid, salvianolic acid, and rosmarinic acid. The flavonoids and flavonols are present in lower, but still significant amount. They include afzelin, Kaempferol 3-O-rutinoside, and rutin.

== Range and habitat ==
The native range of the species is in Europe from France into Russia west of the Ural Mountains and then south in to Kazakhstan. It has been introduced to additional places in Europe such as the United Kingdom, Ireland, Belgium, and Finland. It has also been introduced to North America and is found on the Pacific coast from British Columbia to California and in many of the Rocky Mountain states including Idaho, Montana, Utah, and Colorado. In the eastern US, it is found in Connecticut, Illinois, Maine, Massachusetts, Michigan, New Hampshire, New Jersey, New York, Ohio, Ontario, Pennsylvania, Rhode Island, and Wisconsin. Elsewhere, it also grows in northeastern Argentina.

Common alkanet grows in varied environments such as sandy grasslands in coastal dunes, wastelands that were formerly developed or farmed areas, in shrub communities, the slopes of former quarry sites, and along roadsides.

== Taxonomy ==
As with many plants and other species, the first scientific name was given to Anchusa officinalis by Carl Linnaeus in 1753. At the same time he misidentified some specimens as a separate species, Anchusa angustifolia which is now regarded as a synonym of Anchusa officinalis subsp. officinalis. Since that time, 39 more species and subspecies that are now regarded as synonyms have been published.

Table of Synonyms
Name	Year	Rank	Synonym of:	Notes	Ref.
Anchusa angustifolia L.	1753	species	A. o. subsp. officinalis		
Anchusa arvalis Rchb.	1831	species	A. o. subsp. officinalis		
Anchusa davidovii Stoj.	1933	species	A. o. subsp. officinalis		
Anchusa incarnata Schrad. ex Steud.	1821	species	A. o. subsp. officinalis		
Anchusa leptophylla W.D.J.Koch	1844	species	A. o. subsp. officinalis		
Anchusa lycopsidis Besser ex Link	1821	species	A. o. subsp. officinalis		
Anchusa macedonica Velen.	1898	species	A. o. subsp. intacta	nom. illeg.	
Anchusa macrocalyx Hausskn.	1887	species	A. o. subsp. officinalis		
Anchusa maculata Hornem. ex Steud.	1840	species	A. o. subsp. officinalis		
Anchusa microcalyx Vis.	1829	species	A. o. subsp. officinalis		
Anchusa moesiaca Velen.	1893 publ. 1894	species	A. o. subsp. intacta		
Anchusa ochroleuca Baumg.	1816	species	A. o. subsp. officinalis	nom. illeg.	
Anchusa officinalis var. alba Gray	1821 publ. 1822	subspecies	A. o. subsp. officinalis		
Anchusa officinalis subsp. angustifolia (L.) Bjelcic	1960	subspecies	A. o. subsp. officinalis	not validly publ.	
Anchusa officinalis var. angustifolia (L.) Lej.	1825	subspecies	A. o. subsp. officinalis		
Anchusa officinalis var. angustior Hartm.	1832	subspecies	A. o. subsp. officinalis		
Anchusa officinalis var. arvalis (Rchb.) Rouy	1908	subspecies	A. o. subsp. officinalis		
Anchusa officinalis var. brachyantha Regel	1863	subspecies	A. o. subsp. officinalis		
Anchusa officinalis var. glabrescens Wimm. & Grab.	1827	subspecies	A. o. subsp. officinalis		
Anchusa officinalis var. hirsuta Wimm. & Grab.	1827	subspecies	A. o. subsp. officinalis		
Anchusa officinalis var. hispida Wimm. & Grab.	1827	subspecies	A. o. subsp. officinalis		
Anchusa officinalis var. incarnata Gray	1821 publ. 1822	subspecies	A. o. subsp. officinalis		
Anchusa officinalis subvar. intacta (Griseb.) Guşul.	1927	subspecies	A. o. subsp. intacta		
Anchusa officinalis var. longiflora Griseb.	1844	subspecies	A. o. subsp. intacta		
Anchusa officinalis var. macrantha H.Post	1844	subspecies	A. o. subsp. officinalis		
Anchusa officinalis var. minor Gaudin	1828	subspecies	A. o. subsp. officinalis		
Anchusa officinalis var. moesiaca (Velen.) Guşul.	1927	subspecies	A. o. subsp. intacta		
Anchusa officinalis f. roseiflora H.Post	1846	subspecies	A. o. subsp. officinalis		
Anchusa officinalis f. undulatifolia Wimm. & Grab.	1827	subspecies	A. o. subsp. officinalis		
Anchusa officinalis var. velenovskyi Guşul.	1927	subspecies	A. o. subsp. officinalis		
Anchusa osmanica Velen.	1885	species	A. o. subsp. officinalis		
Anchusa pustulata Schur	1866	species	A. o. subsp. officinalis		
Anchusa spicata Lam.	1792	species	A. o. subsp. officinalis		
Anchusa tinctoria Woodv.	1791	species	A. o. subsp. officinalis	nom. illeg.	
Anchusa undulata var. intacta Griseb.	1844	subspecies	A. o. subsp. intacta		
Anchusa velenovskyi (Guşul.) Stoj.	1933	species	A. o. subsp. officinalis		
Anchusa velenovskyi var. stojanovii St.Kozhukharov	1989	subspecies	A. o. subsp. officinalis		
Buglossum angustifolium (L.) Moench	1794	species	A. o. subsp. officinalis		
Buglossum aspermum Gilib.	1782	species	A. o. subsp. officinalis	opus utique oppr.	
Buglossum officinale Lam.	1779	species	A. o. subsp. officinalis		

As of 2024, Anchusa officinalis L. is listed by Plants of the World Online (POWO) and World Flora Online (WFO) as the accepted name for this species.

=== Subspecies ===
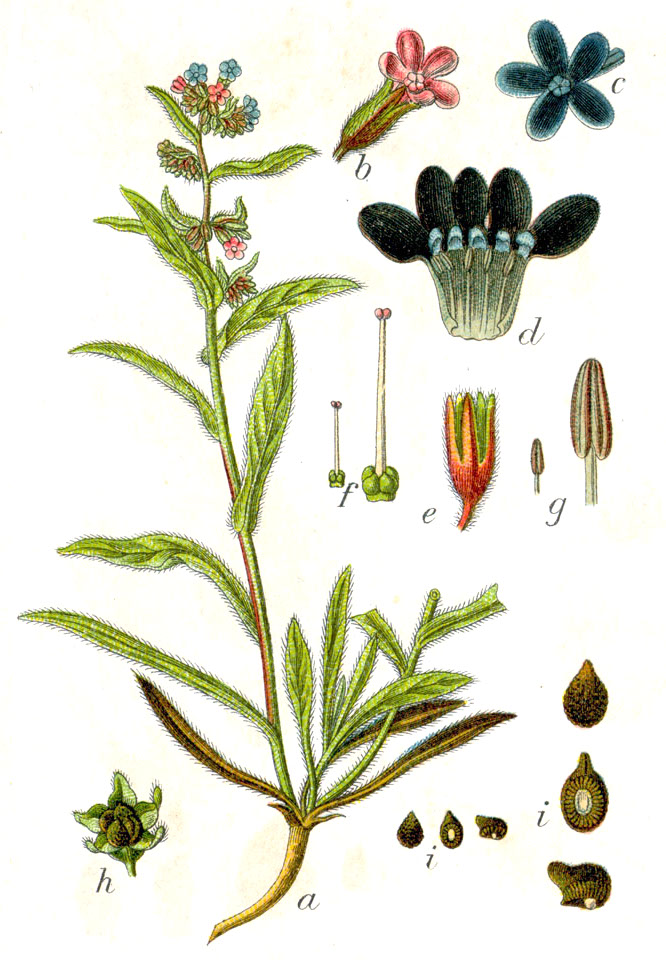
Illustration from Deutschlands Flora in Abbldungen, 1796

As of 2024, two subspecies are recognized. The autonym Anchusa officinalis subsp. officinalis and Anchusa officinalis subsp. intacta. The subspecies intacta was first described and named by August Grisebach in 1844. In 2003 the botanists Federico Selvi and Massimo Bigazzi (1953–2006) published a paper where they better defined the relationship of ssp. intacta with the rest of the species and found evidence that it originated from a hybridization event with the Anatolian relative Anchusa leptophylla.

=== Names ===
The name for the genus Anchusa is botanical Latin derived from the Greek "agchousa" ["angchousa"] or "egchousa", the name for plants from which rouge were made. From the Greek word "egchousizein", to put on rouge. The species name, or specific epithet, officinalis is an adjective used in medieval Latin meaning of a workshop. This name has been applied to many plants that have or had a common use.

This plant is frequently called "common bugloss" in the United States, distinguishing it from Anchusa arvensis which is frequently called simply "bugloss". It is also sometimes called "small garden buglosse". This name is a reference to the blue flowers suggesting the blueish tongue of a cow, from medieval Latin "buglossus", ox-toungued.

The names "common alkanet" or simply "alkanet" are frequently used for this species, but alkanet alone is occasionally used for other species such as Alkanna tinctoria, Pentaglottis sempervirens, Brunnera macrophylla, or to the genus Anchusa as a whole. This name comes to English by way of Spanish from the Moorish Arabic "al-hannat", henna, though the plants have nothing to do with each other.

== Ecology ==
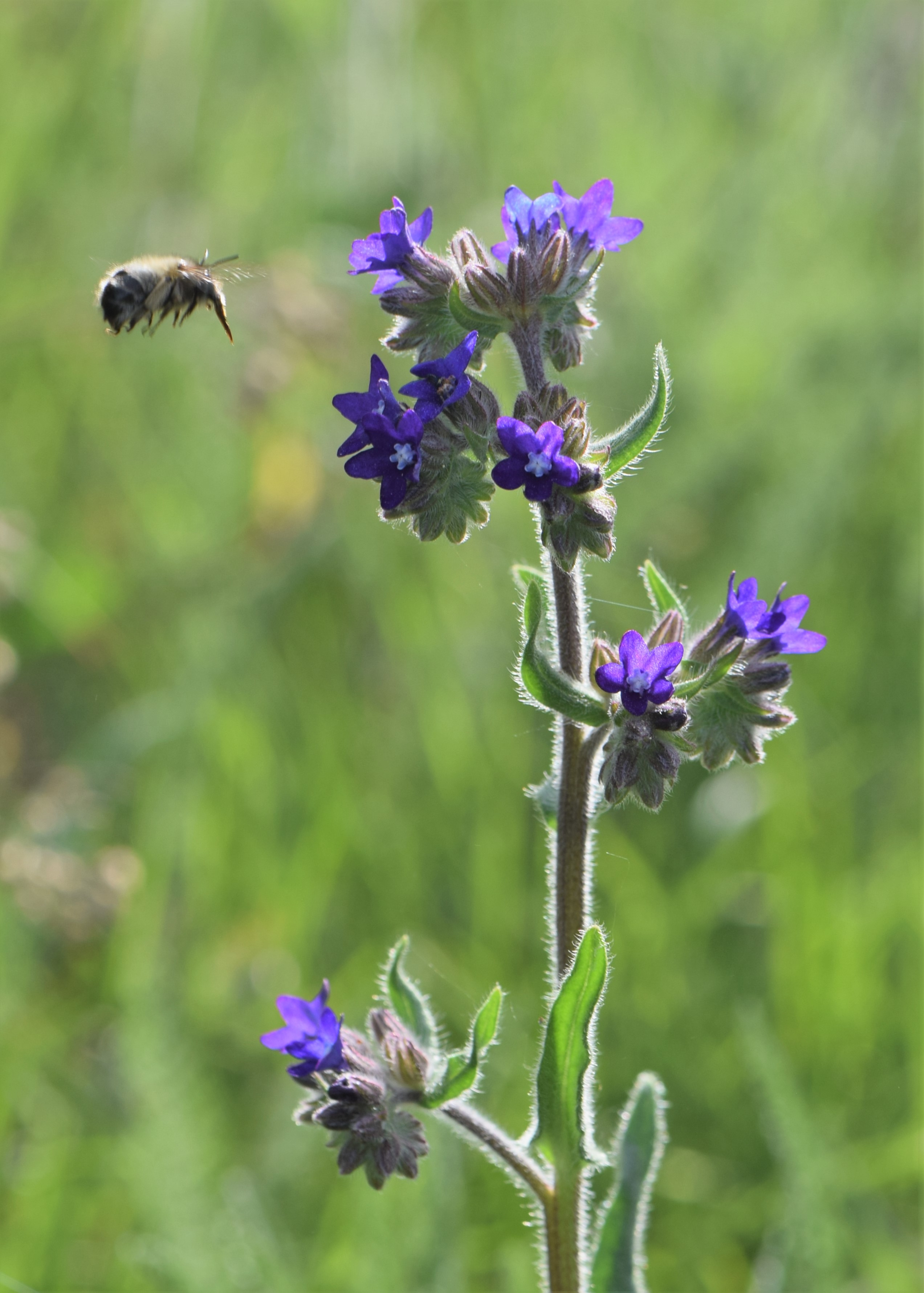
Anchusa officinalis in Baranowice near Wąsosz, SW Poland

The plant provides a great deal of nectar for pollinators. It was rated ninth in nectar production (nectar per unit cover per year) in a UK plants survey conducted by the Agriland project. Bumblebees and cuckoo bumblebees visit the flowers of common bugloss significantly more frequently than other bees, often representing over 90% of the visitors to flowers. The common European species, Bombus subterraneus, is one that is specifically identified as a pollinator. Females of the specialist bee species Hoplitis adunca only visit flowers of genus Echium to collect pollen, but they frequently visit other blue flowers like Anchusa officinalis to collect nectar.

=== Weed status ===
Common bugloss has been considered a noxious weed in Washington State since 1988 with prohibitions on transporting or selling plants in the state. It is similarly listed as a noxious weed in Oregon on their "B List" and "T List", as a regionally common weed that is a focus of preventive control. In British Columbia it is listed as an invasive plant and a "regional noxious weed" in the Regional District of Kootenay Boundary. It is of concern in agriculture both for competing with more desirable forage species in fields and for causing baled hay to rot due to the high moisture content of its leaves.

== Uses ==
=== Ornamental ===
Common bugloss is sometimes planted in kitchen, herb, or wildflower gardens. It is cold tolerant, able to endure winter temperatures at least as low as −20 °C (−4 °F). In a garden setting it requires good drainage, particularly in wet climates. Though in dry climates with typically freely draining soils, like Colorado, it known from relatively moist areas. In gardens seeds are planted as soon as the soil can be worked. Taller plants are staked to prevent them from falling over. They are winter hardy in USDA zones 3–10.

=== Culinary ===
The young leaves and young shoots of bugloss, when the hairs are still soft, are eaten in southern France and parts of Germany. Like the leaves of spinach they are steamed or boiled before consumption. Young leaves are also sometimes used in salads. However, the pyrrolizidine alkaloid lycopsamine has been found in the seeds and the upper parts of the plant. While there are no records of toxic effects in humans or animals similar unsaturated pyrrolizidine alkaloids have caused toxic effects and further studies have been urged as the plant flowers are occasionally sold as a food ingredient.

=== Traditional uses ===
Though physicians in his time regarded Nicholas Culpeper as "something of a fraud", his book The English Physician Enlarged was also very popular, five editions of it being printed before 1698. Culpeper wrote of Anchusa officinalis under the names "alkanet", "orchanet", "Spanish bugloss", and "enchusa". He claimed many virtues for the plant, including that it would cure snake bites and the extraordinary claim that, "if any one that hath newly eaten it, do but spit into the mouth of a serpent, the serpent instantly dies."

In European medical herbalism it was used prior to about 1810 for having "aperient and refrigerant" virtues (laxative and fever lowering). However, the physician and botanist William Woodville wrote, "as all the common oloraceous plants are cooling and laxative, these properties are no peculiar recommendation of Bugloss." The Greek physician in the 1st century Pedanius Dioscorides wrote of the astringent effect of the root of common bugloss. He also said that it was effective for the healing of burns and old ulcers when the root was boiled in oil. Preparations of the root were also used externally to treat pain and soothe the skin as well as promoting wound healing. The late medieval botanist Hieronymus Bock recommended it to treat depression and strengthen the heart. Though both Leonhart Fuchs and Bock wrote that it could be used to treat depression, Woodville attributed all its supposed effectiveness to the fact that it was administered in wine. It is generally regarded as obsolete as a remedy due to the levels of pyrrolizidine alkaloids in the plant.
