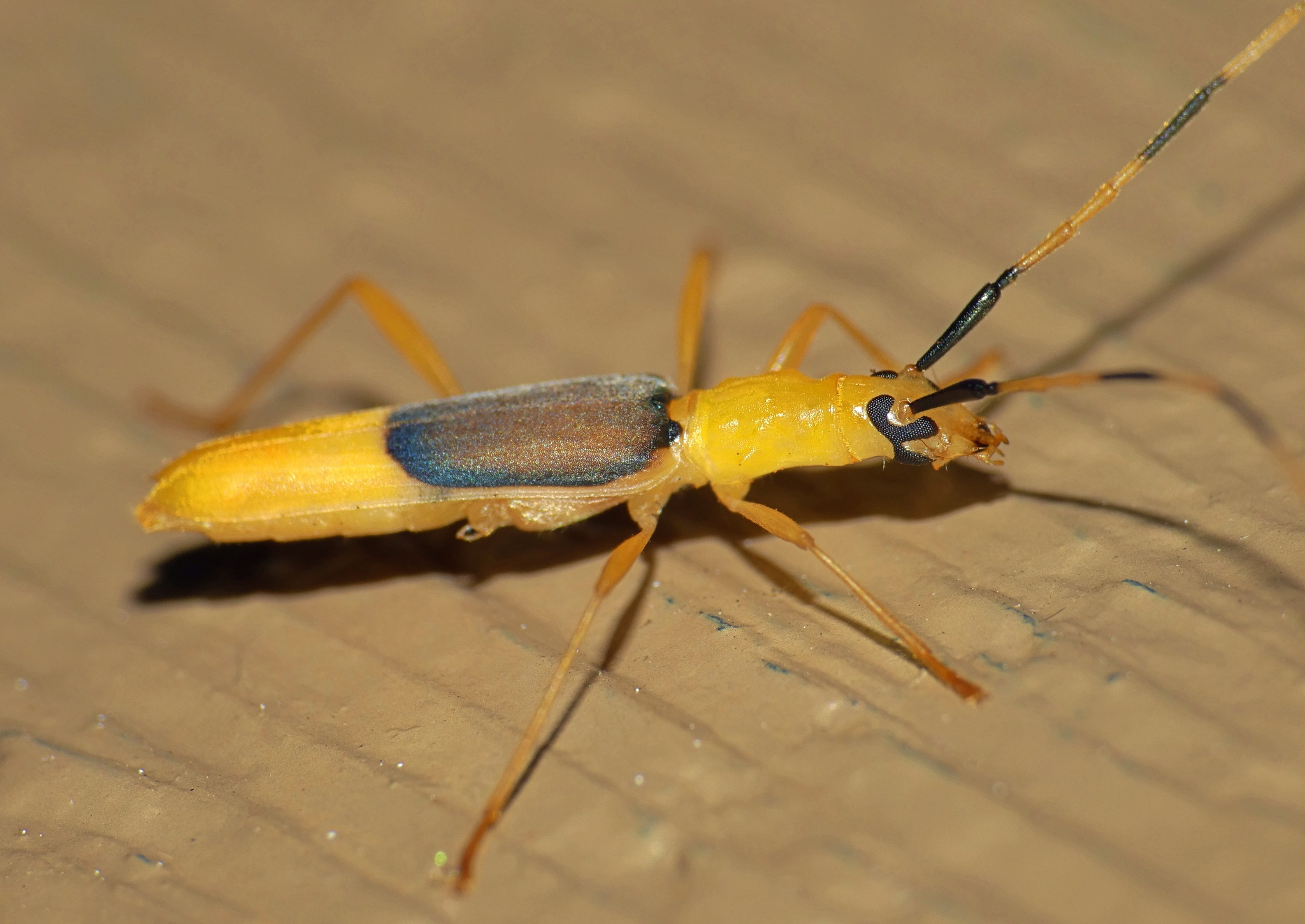
- Tricheops ephippiger

Scientific classification
- Kingdom: Animalia
- Phylum: Arthropoda
- Class: Insecta
- Order: Coleoptera
- Suborder: Polyphaga
- Infraorder: Cucujiformia
- Family: Cerambycidae
- Subfamily: Cerambycinae
- Tribe: Phlyctaenodini; Newman, 1841

= Phlyctaenodini =

Tribe of beetles

Phlyctaenodini is a tribe of longhorn beetles in the subfamily Cerambycinae.

The following genera are recognised in the tribe Phlyctaenodini:

- Agapanthida White, 1846
- Ambeodontus Germain, 1897
- Ancylodonta Blanchard in Gay, 1851
- Astetholea Bates, 1874
- Astetholida Broun, 1880
- Bardistus Newman, 1841
- Blosyropus Redtenbacher, 1868
- Diotimana Hawkins, 1942
- Escalonia Jin et al, 2017
- Imerinus Gahan, 1890
- Leptachrous Bates, 1874
- Montrouzierina Vives, Sudre, Mille & Cazeres 2011
- Ommidion Newman, 1840
- Ophryops White, 1846
- Parasemnus Martins, 1998
- Phlyctaenodes Newman, 1840
- Pseudophlyctaenodes Vives, Sudre, Mille & Cazeres, 2011
- Pseudosemnus Broun, 1893
- Tessaromma Newman, 1840
- Tricheops Newman, 1838
- Votum Broun, 1880
