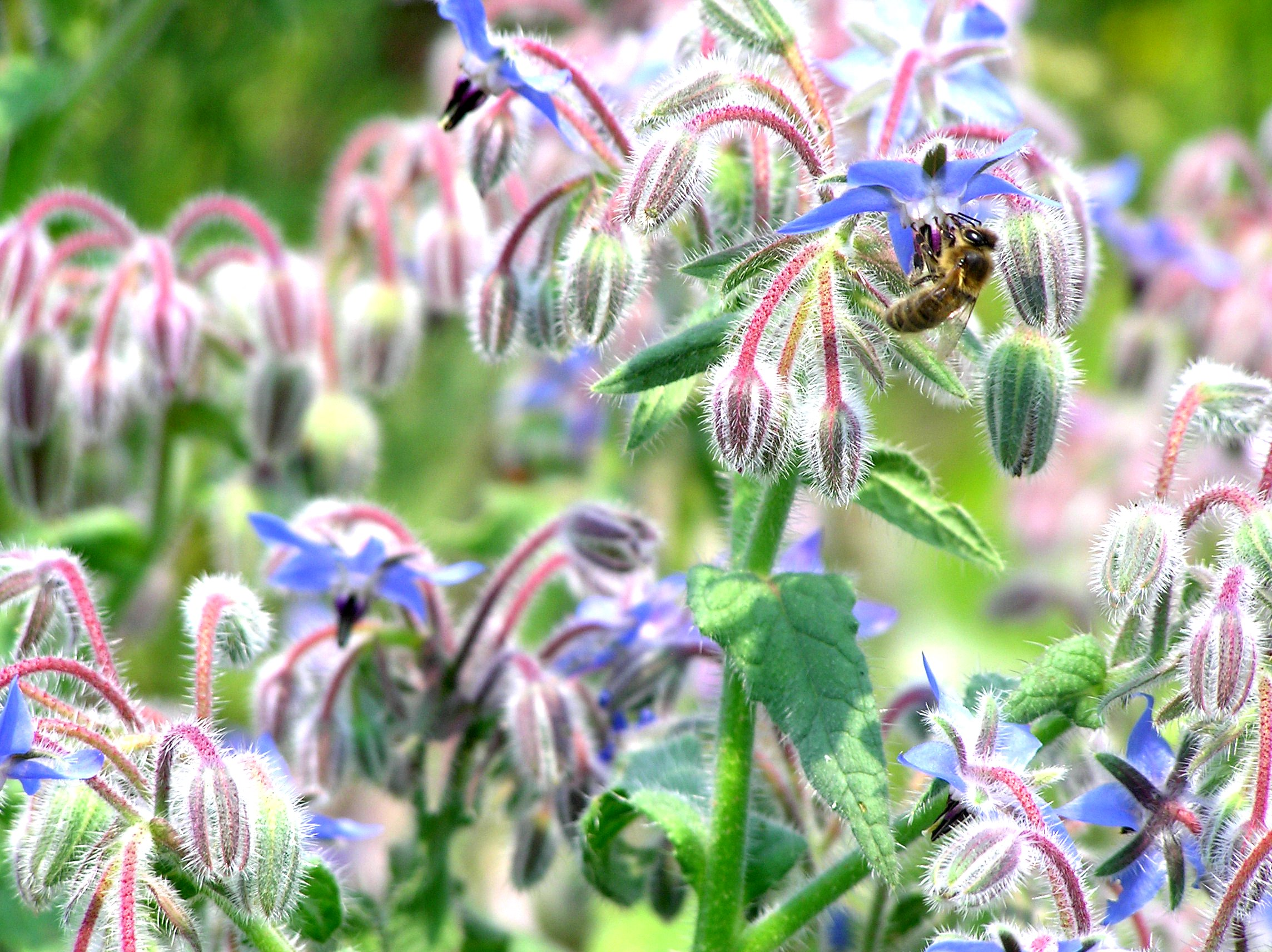
- Borago officinalis

Scientific classification
- Kingdom: Plantae
- Clade: Embryophytes
- Clade: Tracheophytes
- Clade: Spermatophytes
- Clade: Angiosperms
- Clade: Eudicots
- Clade: Asterids
- Order: Boraginales
- Family: Boraginaceae
- Subfamily: Boraginoideae; Arn.

Type genus
- Borago L.

Tribes
- Boragineae; Lithospermeae

= Boraginoideae =

Subfamily of plants within the borage family

Boraginoideae is a subfamily of the plant family Boraginaceae s.s, with about 42 genera. That family is defined in a much broader sense (Boraginaceae s.l.) in the Angiosperm Phylogeny Group (APG) system of classification for flowering plants. The APG has not specified any subfamilial structure within Boraginaceae s.l.

== Taxonomy ==
Some taxonomists placed the genera Codon and Wellstedia in Boraginoideae. Others place one or both of these in separate, monogeneric subfamilies. Codon was long regarded as an odd member of Hydrophylloideae, but in 1998, a molecular phylogenetic study suggested that it is closer to Boraginoideae. Neither is included n more modern classifications.

Some authors proposed a revision of earlier APG systems, in which Boraginaceae had been included as an unplaced family (i.e. not included in a specified order) within the lamiid clade of eudicots. In that system. Boraginaceae was defined broadly (Boraginaceae sensu lato or s.l.). Instead they proposed recognizing five to eight families in a separate order, the Boraginales. In that system Boraginaceae is treated in a narrow sense (sensu stricto or s.s.). Subsequently the order Boraginales was added to the 2016 revision (APG IV) to include Boraginaceae at the ordinal level, in which it was the sole family. The consensus was to continue the broad usage rather than split it into separate families, based on its monophyletic composition. The subfamilial structure applies solely to Boraginaceae s.s., which includes around 1,600 to 1,700 species divided into some 90 genera.

=== Subdivision ===
Comparisons of DNA sequences by cladistic methods suggested the division of Boraginoideae into four tribes: Echiochileae, Boragineae, Lithospermeae, and Cynoglosseae. This was subsequently resolved into only two tribes, Boragineae and Lithospermeae (25 genera). Boragineae was then further subdivided into two subtribes, Boragininae (15 genera) and Moritziinae (2).

=== Genera ===
Genera and approximate number of species in the system of Chacon et al (2016):

- Tribe Boragineae
- Subtribe Boragininae (140 species)

Anchusa, Anchusella, Borago, Brunnera, Cynoglottis, Gastrocotyle, Hormuzakia, Lycopsis, Melanortocarya, Nonea, Pentaglottis, Phyllocara, Pulmonaria, Symphytum, Trachystemon

- Subtribe Moritziinae (6 species)

Moritzia, Thaumatocaryon

- Tribe Lithospermeae (460 species)

Aegonychon, Alkanna, Ancistrocarya, Arnebia, Buglossoides, Cerinthe, Cystostemon, Echiostachys, Echium, Glandora, Halacsya, Huynhia, Lithodora, Lithospermum, Lobostemon, Maharanga, Mairetis, Moltkia, Moltkiopsis, Neatostema, Onosma, Paramoltkia, Podonosma, Pontechium, Stenosolenium.

The following list of genera consists of Codon plus the genera listed for Boraginoideae at the Germplasm Resources Information Network

- Actinocarya Benth.
- Adelocaryum Brand
- Afrotysonia Rauschert
- Alkanna Tausch
- Amblynotus (A.DC.) I. M. Johnst.
- Amphibologyne Brand
- Amsinckia Lehm.
- Anchusa L.
- Ancistrocarya Maxim.
- Anoplocaryum Ledeb.
- Antiotrema Hand.-Mazz.
- Antiphytum DC. ex Meisn.
- Arnebia Forssk.
- Asperugo L.
- Auxemma Miers
- Borago L.
- Bothriospermum Bunge
- Brachybotrys Maxim. ex Oliv.
- Brunnera Steven
- Buglossoides Moench
- Caccinia Savi
- Carmona Cav.
- Cerinthe L.
- Chionocharis I. M. Johnst.
- Choriantha Riedl
- Codon L.
- Craniospermum Lehm.
- Cryptantha Lehm. ex G.Don
- Cynoglossopsis Brand
- Cynoglossum L.
- Cynoglottis (Gusul.) Vural & Kit Tan
- Cystostemon Balf.f.
- Dasynotus I.M.Johnst.
- Decalepidanthus Riedl
- Echiochilon Desf.
- Echiostachys Levyns
- Echium L.
- Elizaldia Willk.
- Embadium J.M.Black
- Eritrichium Schrad. ex Gaudin
- Gastrocotyle Bunge
- Gyrocaryum Valdés
- Hackelia Opiz.
- Halacsya Dörfl.
- Heliocarya Bunge
- Heterocaryum A.DC.
- Huynhia Greuter
- Ivanjohnstonia Kazmi
- Lacaitaea Brand
- Lappula Moench
- Lasiarrhenum I.M.Johnst.
- Lasiocaryum I.M.Johnst.
- LepechiniellaPopov
- Lindelofia Lehm.
- Lithodora Griseb.
- Lithospermum L.
- Lobostemon Lehm.
- Macromeria D.Don
- Maharanga A.DC.
- Mairetis I.M.Johnst.
- Mattiastrum (Boiss.) Brand
- Mertensia Roth
- Metaeritrichium W.T.Wang
- Microcaryum I.M.Johnst.
- Microula Benth.
- Mimophytum Greenm.
- Moltkia Lehm.
- Moltkiopsis I.M.Johnst.
- Moritzia DC. ex Meisn.
- Myosotidium Hook.
- Myosotis L.
- Neatostema I.M.Johnst.
- Nesocaryum I.M.Johnst.
- Nogalia Verdc.
- Nomosa I.M.Johnst.
- Nonea Medik.
- Ogastemma Brummitt
- Omphalodes Mill.
- Omphalolappula Brand
- Omphalotrigonotis W.T.Wang
- Onosma L.
- Oxyosmyles Speg.
- Paracaryum (A.DC.) Boiss.
- Pardoglossum E.Barbier & Mathez
- Pectocarya DC. ex Meisn.
- Pentaglottis Tausch
- Perittostema I.M. Johnst.
- Plagiobothrys Fisch. & C.A.Mey.
- Pseudomertensia Riedl
- Psilolaemus I.M.Johnst.
- Pulmonaria L.
- Rindera Pall.
- Rochelia Rchb.
- Scapicephalus Ovcz. & Czukav.
- Selkirkia Hemsl.
- Sericostoma Stocks
- Sinojohnstonia Hu
- Solenanthus Ledeb.
- Stenosolenium Turcz.
- Stephanocaryum Popov
- Suchtelenia Kar. ex Meisn.
- Symphytum L.
- Thaumatocaryon Baill.
- Thyrocarpus Hance
- Tianschaniella B.Fedtsch. ex Popov
- Trachelanthus Kunze
- Trachystemon D.Don
- Traxara Raf.
- Trichodesma R.Br.
- Trigonocaryum Trautv.
- Trigonotis Steven
- Ulugbekia Zakirov
- Valentiniella Speg.
- Wellstedia Balf.f.

== Bibliography ==
- Chacón, Juliana; Luebert, Federico; Hilger, Hartmut H.; Ovchinnikova, Svetlana; Selvi, Federico; Cecchi, Lorenzo; Guilliams, C. Matt; Hasenstab-Lehman, Kristen; Sutorý, Karel; Simpson, Michael G.; Weigend, Maximilian (24 June 2016). "The borage family (Boraginaceae s.str.): A revised infrafamilial classification based on new phylogenetic evidence, with emphasis on the placement of some enigmatic genera". Taxon. 65 (3): 523–546. doi:10.12705/653.6. hdl:2158/1062785.
- Cohen, James I. (April 2014). "A phylogenetic analysis of morphological and molecular characters of Boraginaceae: evolutionary relationships, taxonomy, and patterns of character evolution". Cladistics. 30 (2): 139–169. doi:10.1111/cla.12036. PMID 34784688. S2CID 25399963.
- Ferguson, Diane M. (July 1998). "Phylogenetic Analysis and Relationships in Hydrophyllaceae Based on ndhF Sequence Data". Systematic Botany. 23 (3): 253–268. doi:10.2307/2419504. JSTOR 2419504.
- Weigend, Maximilian; Luebert, Federico; Gottschling, Marc; Couvreur, Thomas L.P.; Hilger, Hartmut H.; Miller, James S. (October 2014). "From capsules to nutlets-phylogenetic relationships in the Boraginales". Cladistics. 30 (5): 508–518. doi:10.1111/cla.12061. PMID 34794245. S2CID 11954615.
- Distribution Map And Genus list At Boraginaceae At Boraginales At: Trees Archived 2015-05-21 at the Wayback Machine At: APweb At: Missouri Botanical Garden
