= Alpine forget-me-not =

Alpine forget-me-not is a common name for several plants in the Boraginaceae (forget-me-not) family and may refer to:

- Eritrichium, a genus with 71 species;
- Myosotis alpestris, circumpolar arctic and montane distribution.
Plants named Alpine forget-me-not

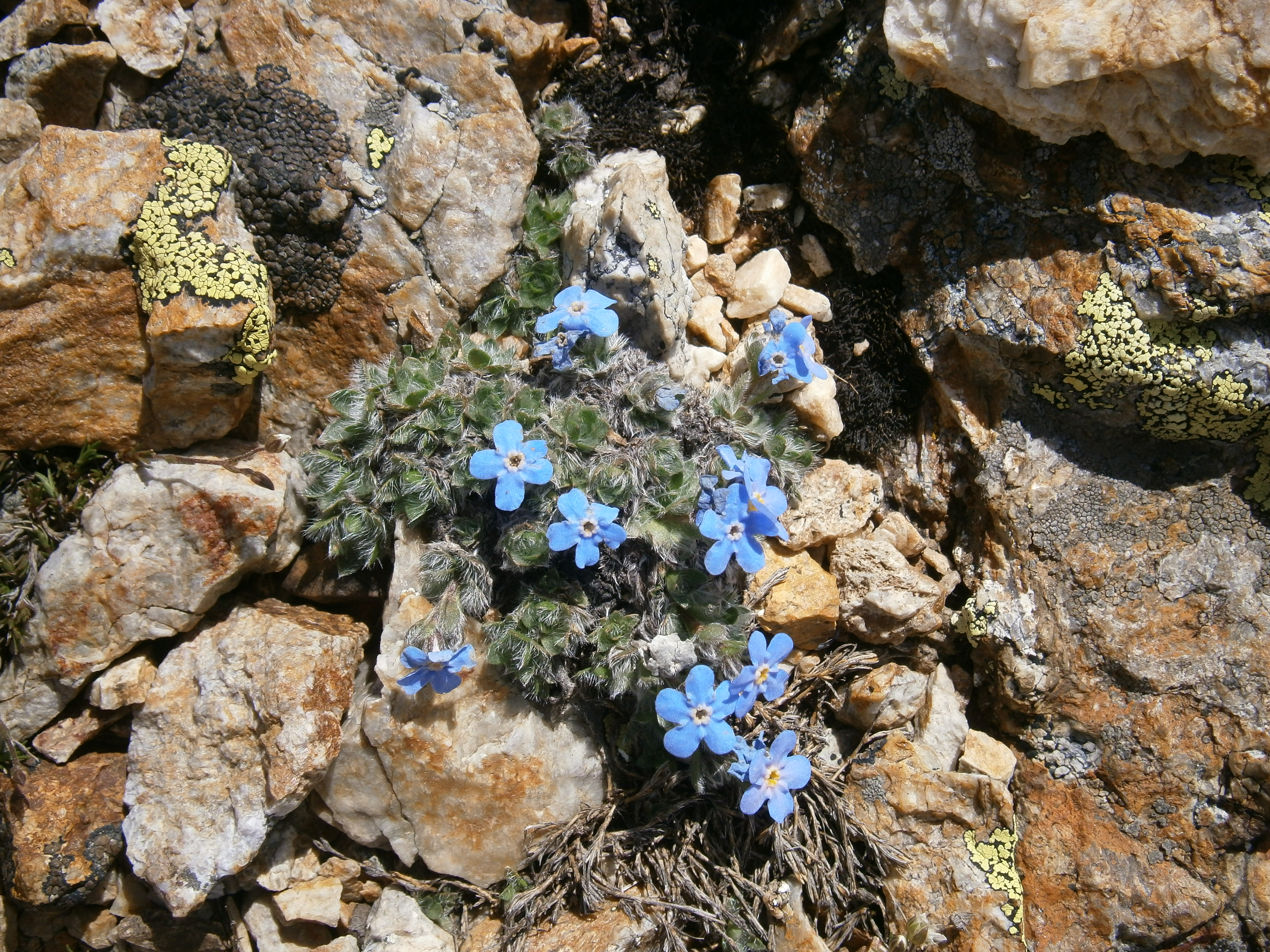
Arctic alpine forget-me-not, Eritrichium nanum, France

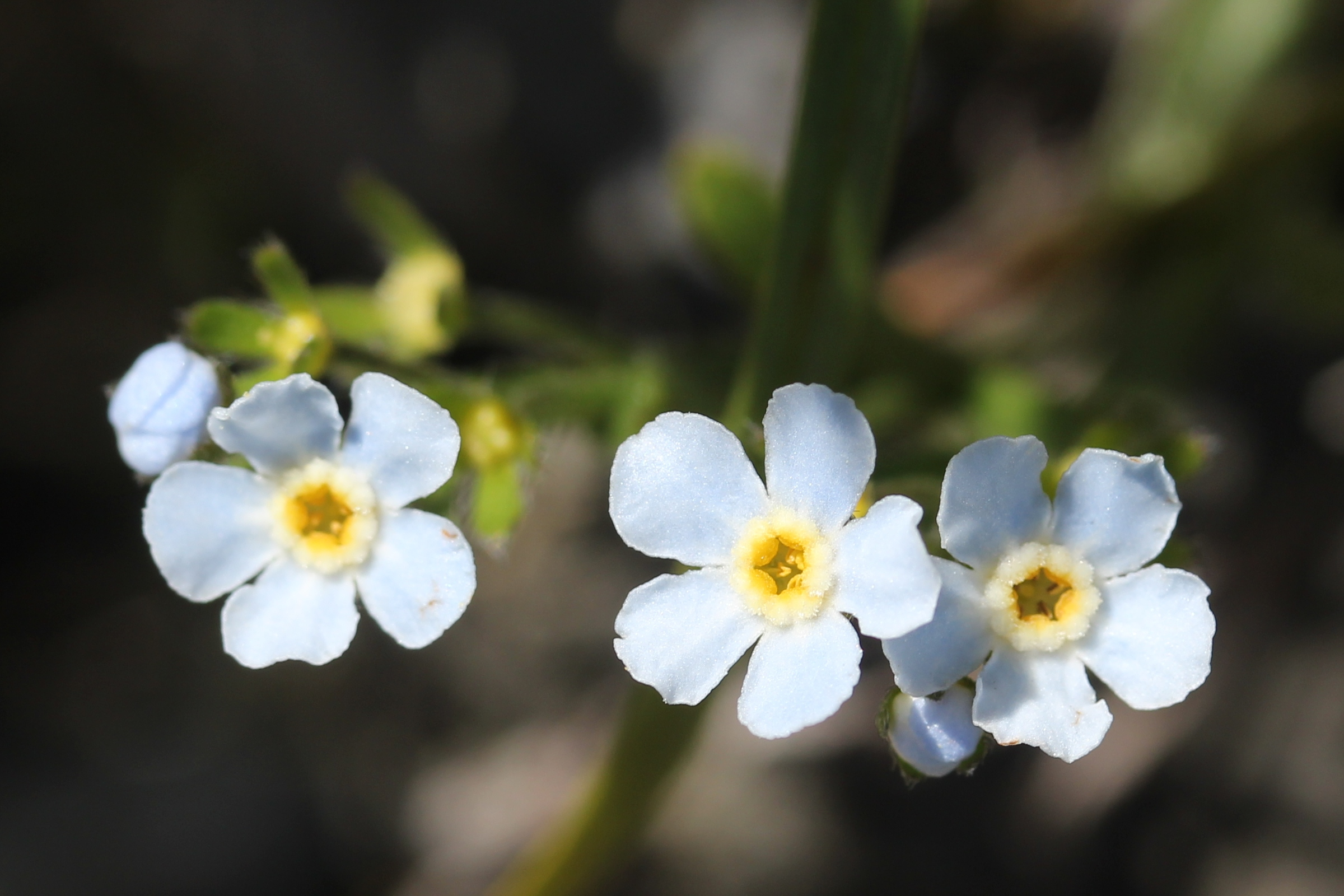
Eritrichium nipponicum, Japan

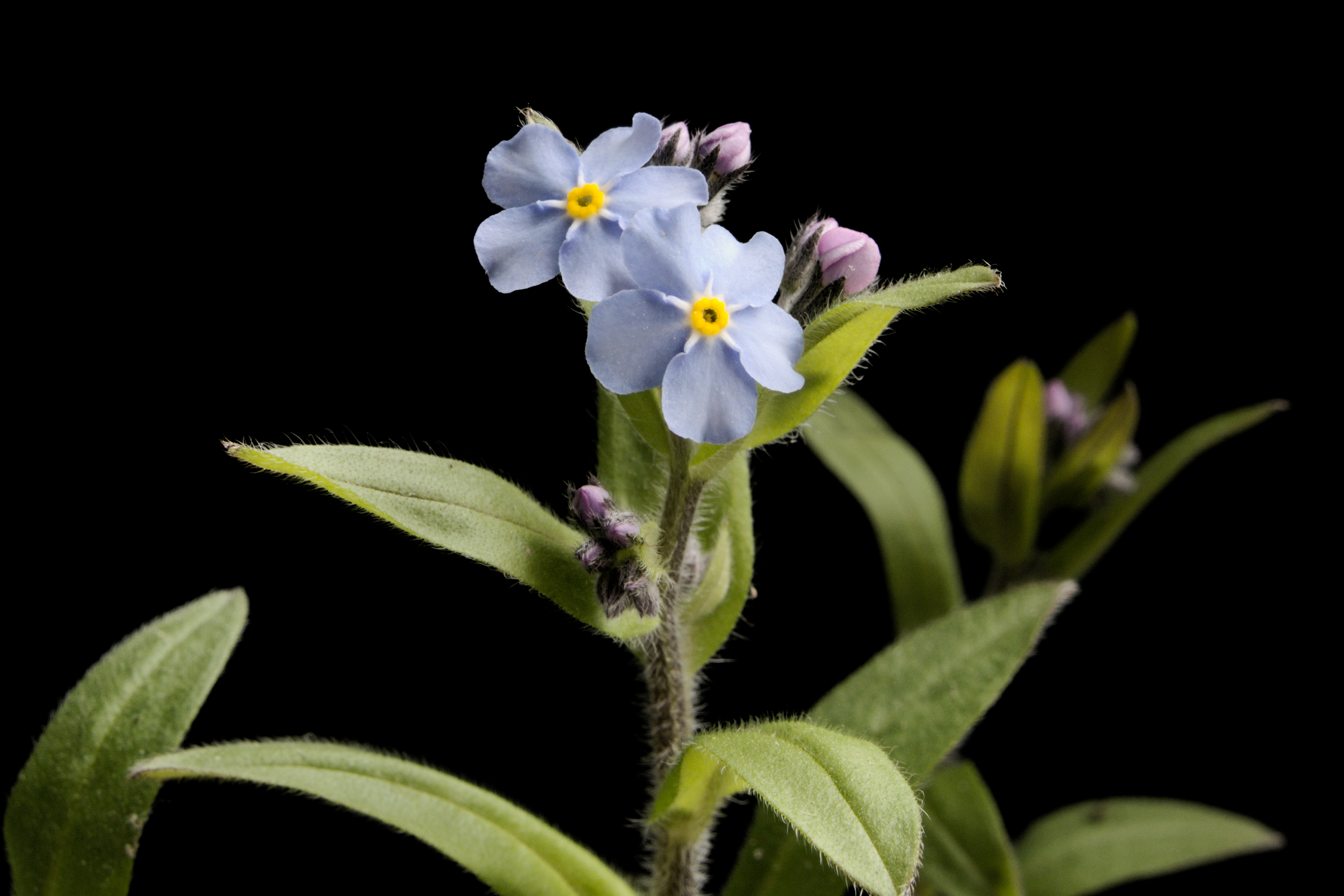
Myosotis alpestris, Russia
