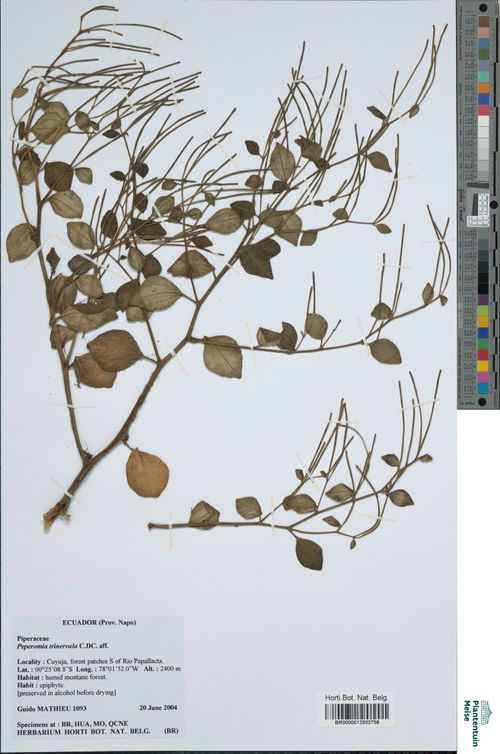

Scientific classification
- Kingdom: Plantae
- Clade: Tracheophytes
- Clade: Angiosperms
- Clade: Magnoliids
- Order: Piperales
- Family: Piperaceae
- Genus: Peperomia
- Species: P. trinervula

Binomial name
- Peperomia trinervula C.DC.

Synonyms
- Peperomia roraimana C.DC.; Peperomia moritzii C.DC.; Peperomia purpurascens Moritzi ex C.DC.

= Peperomia trinervula =

Species of flowering plant

Peperomia trinervula is a species of perennial epiphyte or lithophyte in the genus Peperomia found in Panama and some parts of South America. It primarily grows on wet tropical biomes. Its conservation status is Not Threatened.

== Description ==
The first specimens where collected in Venezuela.

Peperomia trinervula has ovate leaves. The apex is thin, obtuse, and hairy on both sides. It is 3-nerved, whose central nerve is adaxially drawn to the tip. The lateral nerves are subtle. The petiole is pubescent. The catkin has filiform flowers. The peduncle is superior to petioles. The bracts is an elliptic-rounded. The ovary is emergent. The stigma is minute.

The base grows along the ground. The limbs are 0.003 mm long and 0.02 wide. The petioles are 0.007-0.01 mm long.

== Taxonomy and naming ==
It was described in 1869 by Casimir de Candolle in Prodromus Systematis Naturalis Regni Vegetabilis, from specimens collected by Moritzi. It gets its name from the description of the leaves.

== Subtaxa ==
Following subtaxa are accepted.

- Peperomia rotundata var. trinervula C.DC.
- Peperomia trinervula var. roraimana (C.DC.) Trel. & Yunck.
- Peperomia trinervula var. suboppositifolia (C.DC.) Trel. & Yunck.
- Peperomia trinervula var. trinervula (C.DC.) Trel. & Yunck.

== Distribution and Habitat ==
It is found in Panama and parts of South America, specifically Tropical America. It grows on an epiphyte or lithophyte environment and is a perennial herb. In Colombia, its elevation range is 1800 – 3550 meters. It grows on wet tropical biomes.

== Conservation ==
This species is assessed as Not Threatened, in a preliminary report.
