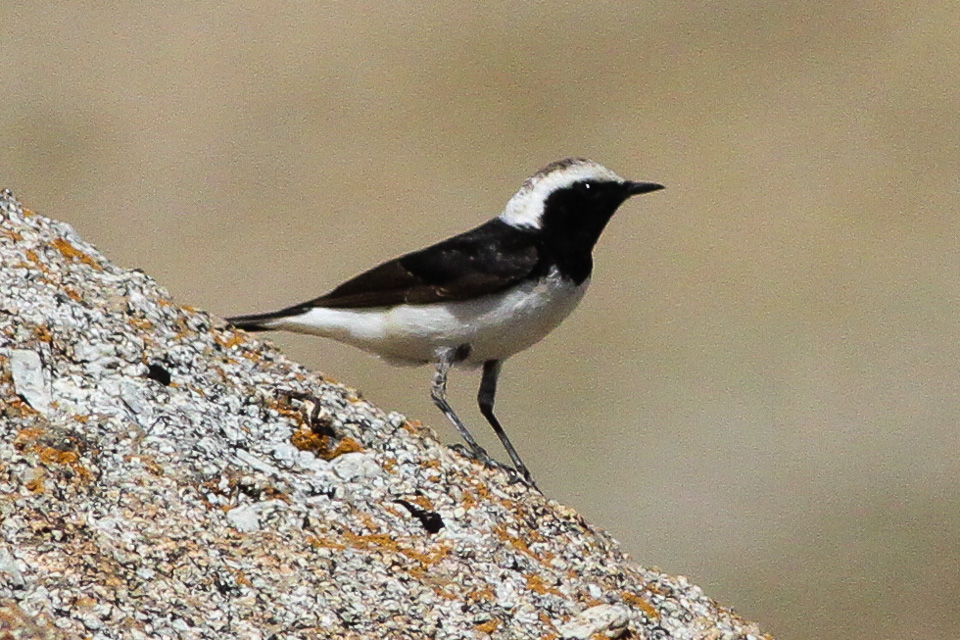
- Male

Conservation status
- Least Concern (IUCN 3.1)

Scientific classification
- Kingdom: Animalia
- Phylum: Chordata
- Class: Aves
- Order: Passeriformes
- Family: Muscicapidae
- Genus: Oenanthe
- Species: O. pleschanka

Binomial name
- Oenanthe pleschanka (Lepechin, 1770)
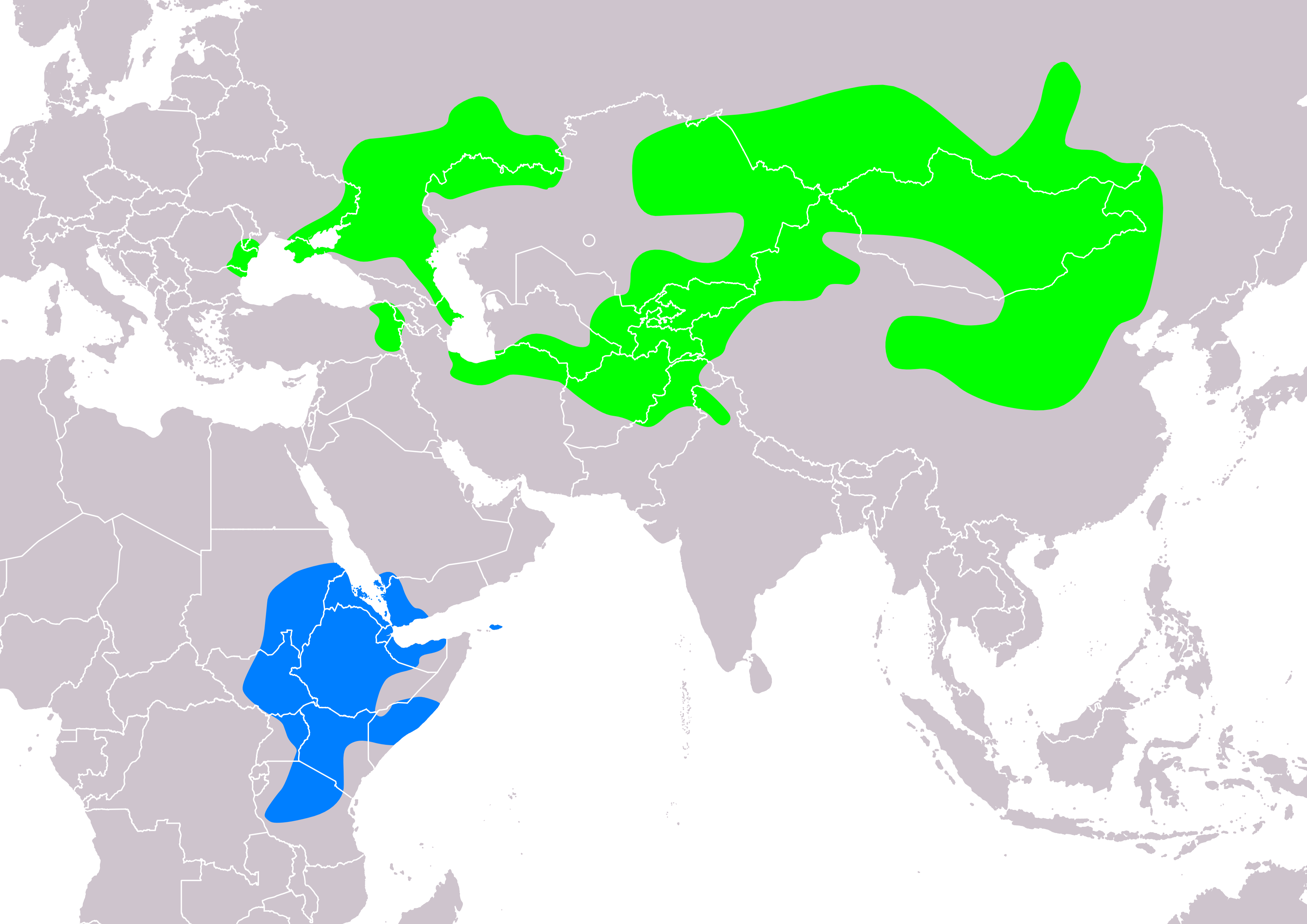
- Range of O. pleschanka Breeding Non-breeding

Synonyms
- Oenanthe leucomela; Oenanthe somalica; Oenanthe vittata

= Pied wheatear =

Species of bird

The pied wheatear (Oenanthe pleschanka) is a wheatear, a small insectivorous passerine bird that was formerly classed as a member of the thrush family Turdidae, but is now more generally considered to be an Old World flycatcher (family Muscicapidae). This migratory central Asiatic wheatear occurs from the extreme southeast of Europe to China, and has been found wintering in India and northeastern Africa. It is a very rare vagrant to western Europe.

The male is a boldly marked white-and-black bird. The white crown tinged with brown contrasts with the black face and throat and white rump. The female is browner, and the head is washed with sandy buff. Females are darker than the females of the northern wheatear, look smaller and show less white on the rump. The tail feathers are white with characteristic black markings, which form an inverted black "T" pattern that resembles the tail of the western black-eared wheatear. This 14 centimetres (5.5 in) bird nests in open, stony, sparsely vegetated regions, laying four to six eggs in a hole, under a stone or in a rock crevice. The pied wheatear primarily eats insects but will also take seeds.

== Etymology ==
The genus name Oenanthe is derived from the Ancient Greek oenos (οίνος) "wine" and anthos (ανθός) "flower". It refers to the northern wheatear's return to Greece in the spring just as the grapevines blossom. Pleschanka is the Russian name for the pied wheatear and refers to the white cap (plesch is a bald spot on the head). "Wheatear" is not derived from "wheat" or any sense of "ear", but is a 16th-century linguistic corruption of "white" and "arse", referring to the prominent white rump found in most species.

== Description ==
The crown, nape and neck of the adult male pied wheatear are pale brown, the feathers having pale tips and white bases. The mantle and scapulars are black with buff tips to the feathers. The back, rump and upper tail-coverts are creamy-white. The central pair of tail feathers are black with white bases but the rest are white with black tips, the outer pair having rather more black than the rest. There is a narrow buff-coloured line extending from the base of the beak to over the eye and the lores, ear coverts, chin, throat and upper breast are black. The rest of the breast is buff, the belly creamy-buff and the underwing coverts and axillaries are black tipped with white. The wing feathers are black with tips and edgings of creamy-buff. The bird moults in late summer and by the following year, the edges of the feathers are abraded and the crown and nape are white and the mantle, scapulars and wings black. The beak, legs and feet are black and the eyes dark brown. The length is about 5.75 inches (146 mm).

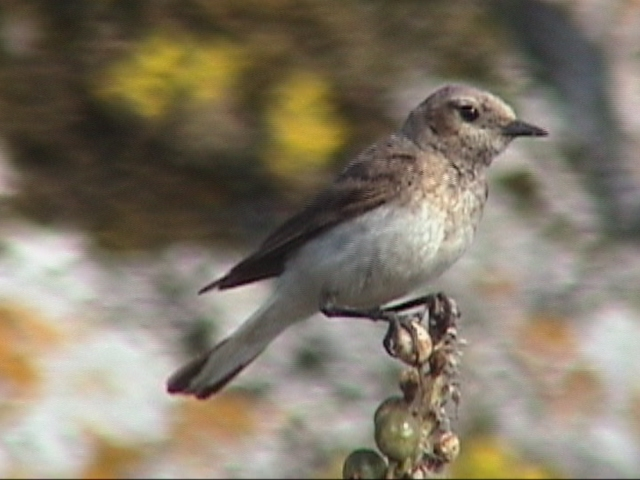
Female in Bulgaria

The adult female is similar to the male but the mantle and scapulars are brown with buff tips rather than black, the tail feathers are brown and white and the wing feathers brown with buff tips. Again, abrasion wears of the tips of the feathers and the bird becomes more uniformly brown and white with creamy buff underparts. The female is slightly smaller than the male. The juvenile is similar to the female but the feathers of the brown upperparts have pale centres near the tips giving the bird a speckled appearance.

The voice is a harsh zack zack. The song is low-pitched and musical and is performed by the male in early summer and again in August. It consists of a variable, imitative series of notes, sometimes lark-like and sometimes whistling, pouring out in a continual stream. It is sung from a perch on a rock or other high place or in the air during flight.

== Distribution and habitat ==
The pied wheatear is native to Southeast Europe and Western Asia. The breeding range extends from Romania and Bulgaria to Siberia, Altai and Mongolia and southwards to the Caucasus, Transcaspia, Turkestan, Iran and Afghanistan. It occurs at altitudes of up to 2,000 metres (6,600 ft) in the Altai and up to 3,000 metres (9,800 ft) in the Tien Shan. It migrates to Northeast Africa, passing through Southwest Asia on the way. In the breeding season it is found in rough open country, steppes with scant vegetation, stony slopes and hilly country. In its winter quarters it is found in similar locations with rock, scree and on plains with thorny scrub. It sometimes visits grassy areas and gardens. It has occurred as a vagrant in Italy, Heligoland and Scotland.

== Behaviour ==
The pied wheatear is rather shy but is conspicuous when spotted. It is not gregarious and single birds or pairs are found in rough, rocky countryside. It likes to perch on a bush or rock, alert and looking around and bobbing its tail up and down. When it spots a prey item it swoops down to the ground briefly to pick it up before returning to its perch. Its diet consists of small invertebrates such as ants, grasshoppers, beetles, flies and moths and their larvae, spiders and mites, and seeds are also eaten.

== Breeding ==
The nest is made in holes in a riverbank, under stones and rocks and in crevices. It is made from dried grass stems and lined with slender roots and a few downy feathers. Four to six greenish-blue eggs with rust-coloured spots on the larger end are laid from early May onwards. They average 19.3 by 15.1 millimetres (0.76 in × 0.59 in) and there is normally a single brood.

== Status ==
The pied wheatear has a wide range across Eastern Europe and Western Asia and is common across that range. There are estimated to be somewhere between 96,000 and 420,000 individuals in Europe. As Europe forms 5 to 24% of the global range, the total population may be in the region of 400,000-8,400,000 individuals. The population is believed to be stable with no particular threats so the bird is rated as being of "Least Concern" by Birdlife International.
