= R. nivalis =

R. nivalis may refer to:

- Ranunculus nivalis, a flowering plant species
- Rubus nivalis, a raspberry species
- Rumex nivalis, a herb species
