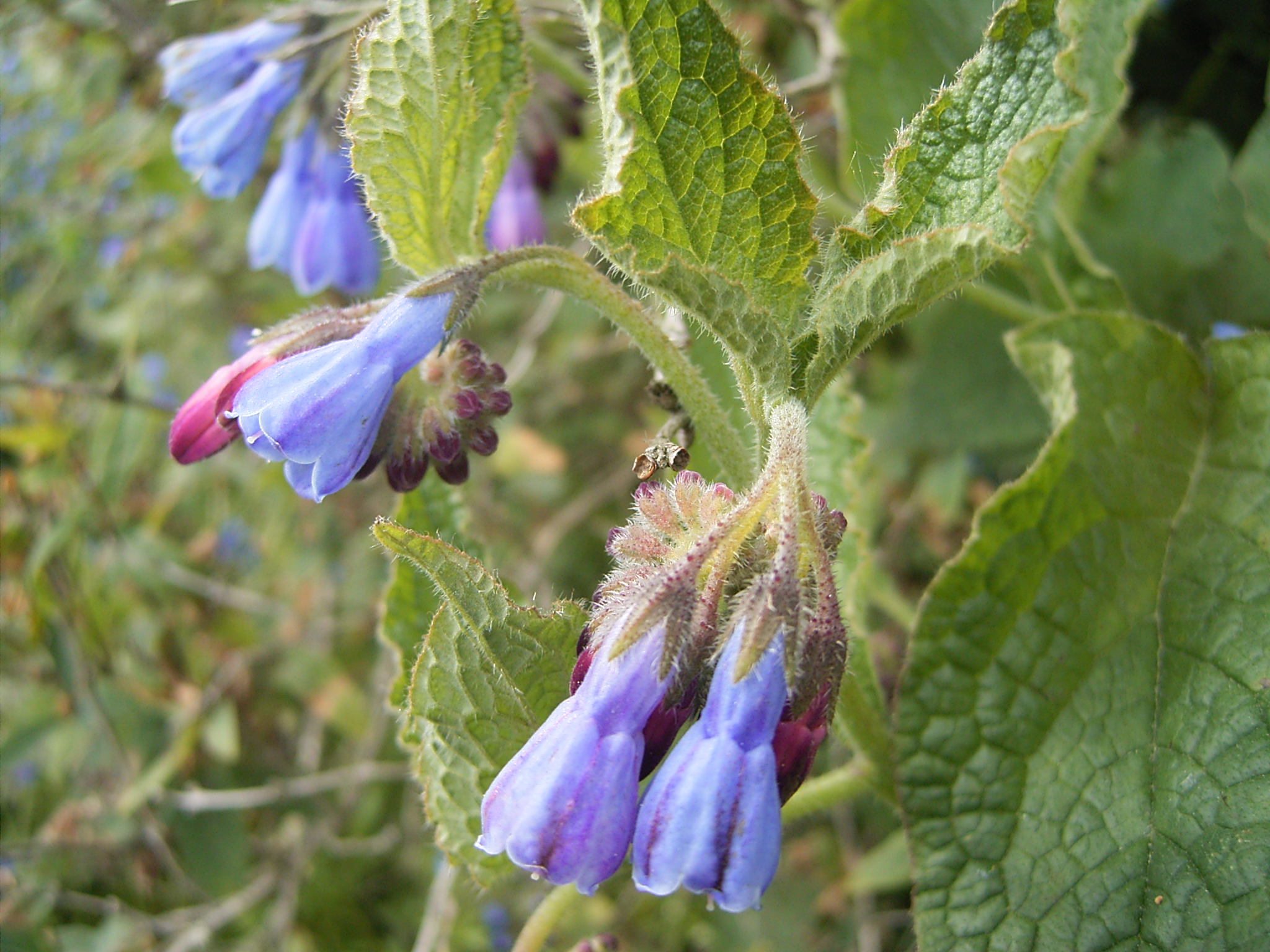

Scientific classification
- Kingdom: Plantae
- Clade: Tracheophytes
- Clade: Angiosperms
- Clade: Eudicots
- Clade: Asterids
- Order: Boraginales
- Family: Boraginaceae
- Genus: Symphytum
- Species: S. asperum

Binomial name
- Symphytum asperum Lepech.

= Symphytum asperum =

Species of plant

Symphytum asperum is a flowering plant of the genus Symphytum in the family Boraginaceae. Common names include rough comfrey and prickly comfrey. It is the tallest Symphytum species. It is native to Asia, and it is known in Europe and North America as an introduced species and sometimes a weed. Symphytum × uplandicum, the naturally occurring hybrid with the common comfrey (Symphytum officinale), is the economically most important kind of comfrey.
