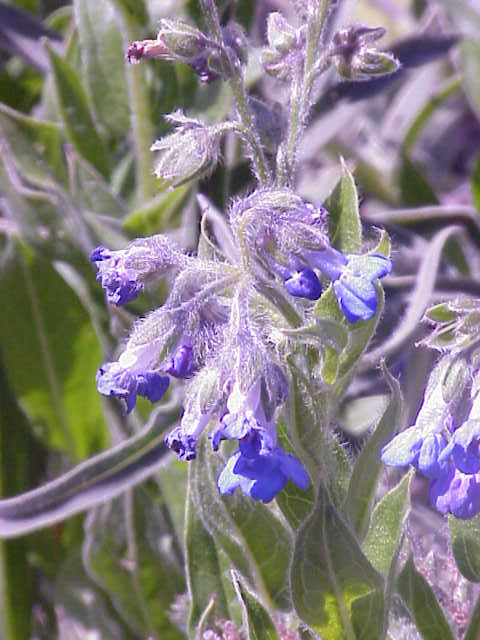
- Pseudomertensia echioides

Scientific classification
- Kingdom: Plantae
- Clade: Embryophytes
- Clade: Tracheophytes
- Clade: Angiosperms
- Clade: Eudicots
- Clade: Asterids
- Order: Boraginales
- Family: Boraginaceae
- Subfamily: Boraginoideae
- Genus: Pseudomertensia; Riedl

Type species
- Pseudomertensia elongata (Decaisne) Riedl

Species
- See text

= Pseudomertensia =

Genus of flowering plants in the borage family

Pseudomertensia is a genus of flowering plants in the family Boraginaceae. They are perennial herbs with blue or bluish purple flowers. Their natural range is from Iran to the Himalayas. None have been found in China or Russia. P. echioides, and the type species for the genus, P. elongata, are occasionally cultivated as ornamentals.

Most sources list about 12 species, but some include as many as 14. Pseudomertensia was once thought to be closely related to Mertensia, but molecular phylogenetic studies have placed it close to Myosotis.

== Species ==
Author citations are from Tropicos.

- Pseudomertensia chitralensis (Riedl)Riedl 1967
- Pseudomertensia echioides (Bentham)Riedl 1967
- Pseudomertensia efornicata (Rechinger f. & Riedl)Riedl 1967
- Pseudomertensia elongata (Decaisne)Riedl 1967
- Pseudomertensia flavescens Rafiq 1996
- Pseudomertensia moltkioides (Royle ex Bentham)es:Syed Muhammad Anwar Kazmi 1970
- Pseudomertensia parviflora (Decaisne)Riedl 1967
- Pseudomertensia sericophylla (Riedl)Y.J.Yasin 1989
- Pseudomertensia trollii (Melchior)R.R.Stewart & Kazmi 1970

== History ==
In 1967, Harald Udo von Riedl erected the genus Pseudomertensia for eight species which, at that time, were recognized in Mertensia. The genus is named for its apparent, but false, relationship with Mertensia.

The species recognized by Riedl were P. chitralensis, P. echioides, P. efornicata, P. elongata, P. parviflora, P. edelbergii, P. primuloides, and P. lindelofioides. The first five of these are still universally recognized. Some authors treat P. edelbergii as a variety of P. trollii, and P. primuloides as a variety of P. moltkioides. Some authors believe that P. lindelofioides is misplaced in Pseudomertensia, and they place it in Lindelofia as Lindelofia olgea. It is indigenous to Turkestan and Afghanistan. Lindelofia longiflora has been sampled in molecular phylogenetic studies, but L. olgea has not.

The distinctive Pakistani species, Pseudomertensia sericophylla is placed by some authors in a monospecific genus as Decalepidanthus sericophyllus. Decalepidanthus is occasionally misspelled. It means "flower with ten scales".

After Pseudomertensia was established in 1967, six more species were described in 1970 by es:Syed Muhammad Anwar Kazmi in the second of a series of seven articles revising the Boraginaceae of Pakistan. A few more species were added later, the last of these being P. flavescens in 1996.

The segregation of Pseudomertensia from Mertensia has been confirmed by cladistic analysis of DNA sequences. These place Pseudomertensia closest to Myosotis, at least among the genera that have been sampled so far. The sampling of genera in taxonomic studies of Boraginaceae has not been sufficient to determine whether Pseudomertensia and Myosotis are sister groups.
