= Trachelanthus =

Trachelanthus may refer to:

- Trachelanthus (plant), a genus of flowering plants in the family Boraginaceae
- Trachelanthus (weevil), a genus of weevils in the family Curculionidae
