= Elisabeth von Matt =

Austrian astronomer

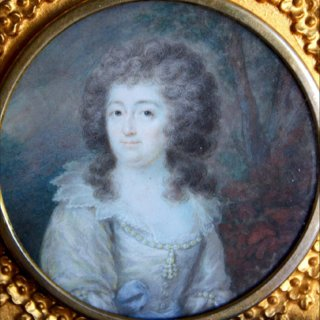
Elisabeth von Matt painted in the Rococo style

Elisabeth von Matt (1762–1814) was an Austrian astronomer active in the late 18th and early 19th century who is regarded as the only female scientist to have her observations published in European astronomy journals during the period. She worked primarily in positional astronomy, documenting the asteroids Pallas and Juno.

== Life ==
Elisabeth von Matt (née Humelauer) was a baroness living in Vienna. There, she built a private observatory and ordered the equipment needed to observe the sky. Her observations were published in Bode's Astronomisches Jahrbuch and Franz Xaver von Zach's Monatliche Correspondenz. In addition to her own contributions to measurements at the time, von Matt supported the advancement of the field of astronomy by opening her observatory to Johann Tobias Bürg, who was her mentor, and assisting in the supply of books and instruments in the community.

== Legacy ==
Austrian botanist Josef August Schultes named the plant genus Mattia in honor of von Matt in 1809. It is now listed as a synonym of Rindera. Then in 1915, Mattiastrum a genus of flowering plants from Middle Asia, belonging to the family Boraginaceae was also named in her honor.

The minor planet 9816 von Matt, discovered in 1960 by Cornelis Johannes van Houten and I. van Houten-Groeneveld, was named after von Matt. Two instruments owned by von Matt—a sextant manufactured by Edward Troughton and a chronometer manufactured by John Arnold (watchmaker)—are held in the collection of the Vienna Observatory at the University of Vienna.
