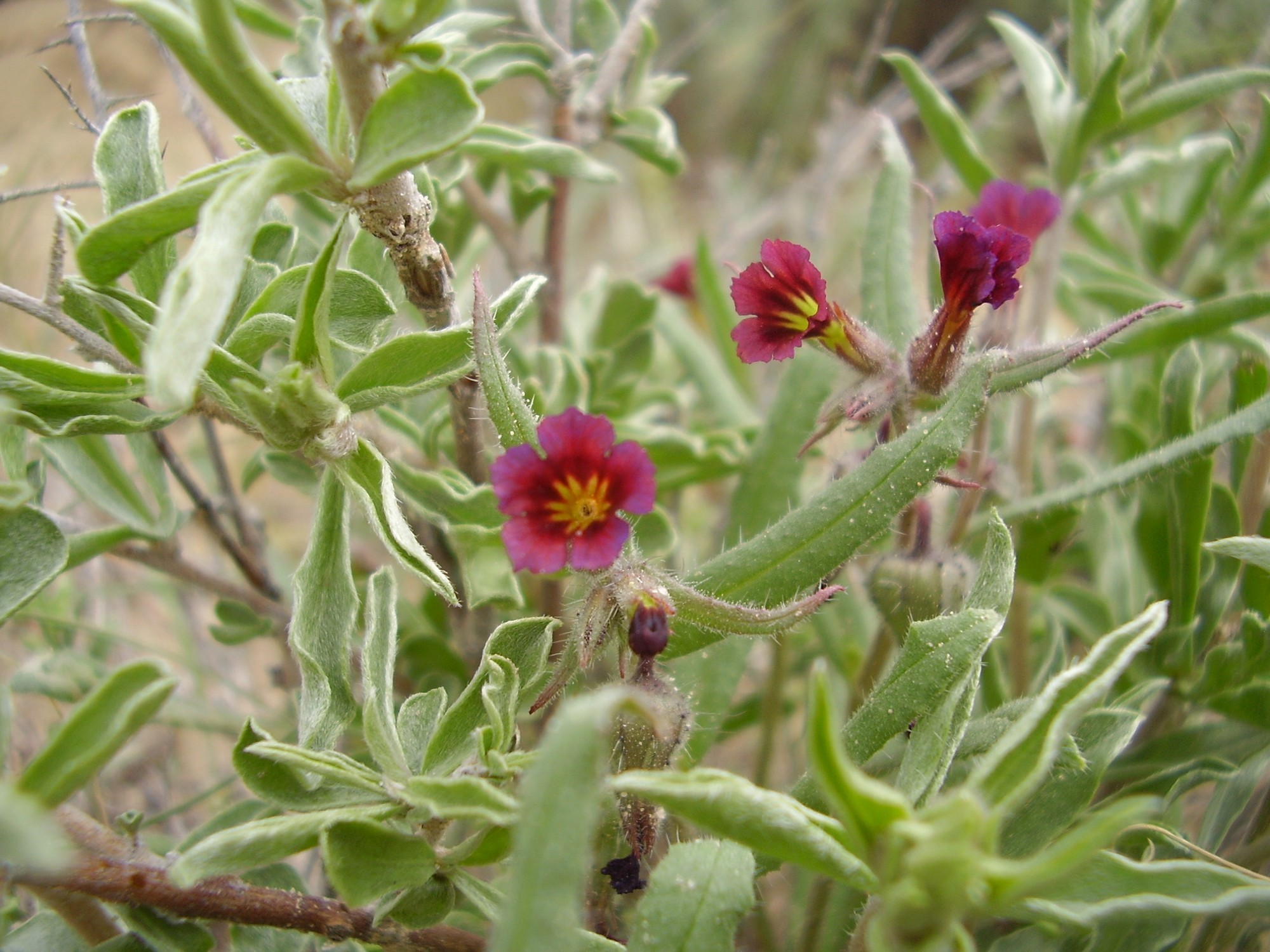

Scientific classification
- Kingdom: Plantae
- Clade: Tracheophytes
- Clade: Angiosperms
- Clade: Eudicots
- Clade: Asterids
- Order: Boraginales
- Family: Boraginaceae
- Genus: Nonea
- Species: N. caspica

Binomial name
- Nonea caspica (Willd.) G.Don

Synonyms
- Anchusa picta M.Bieb.; Echioides caspica (Willd.) Poir.; Echioides picta (M.Bieb.) Poir.; Lycopsis caspica (Willd.) Lehm.; Lycopsis picta Lehm.; Nonea diffusa Boiss. & Buhse; Nonea picta (M.Bieb.) Sweet; Nonea sordida Fisch. & C.A.Mey.; Onosma caspica Willd.

= Nonea caspica =

Species of flowering plant

Nonea caspica is an annual herb in the family Boraginaceae, native from Turkey to Central Asia and Pakistan.

== Distribution ==
It is native to the following countries or regions: Afghanistan, Iran, Iraq, Kazakhstan, Kyrgyzstan, Pakistan, Russia, Tajikistan, Transcaucasia, Turkey, Turkmenistan and Uzbekistan. But it has been introduced in Krasnoyarsk and West Siberia.
