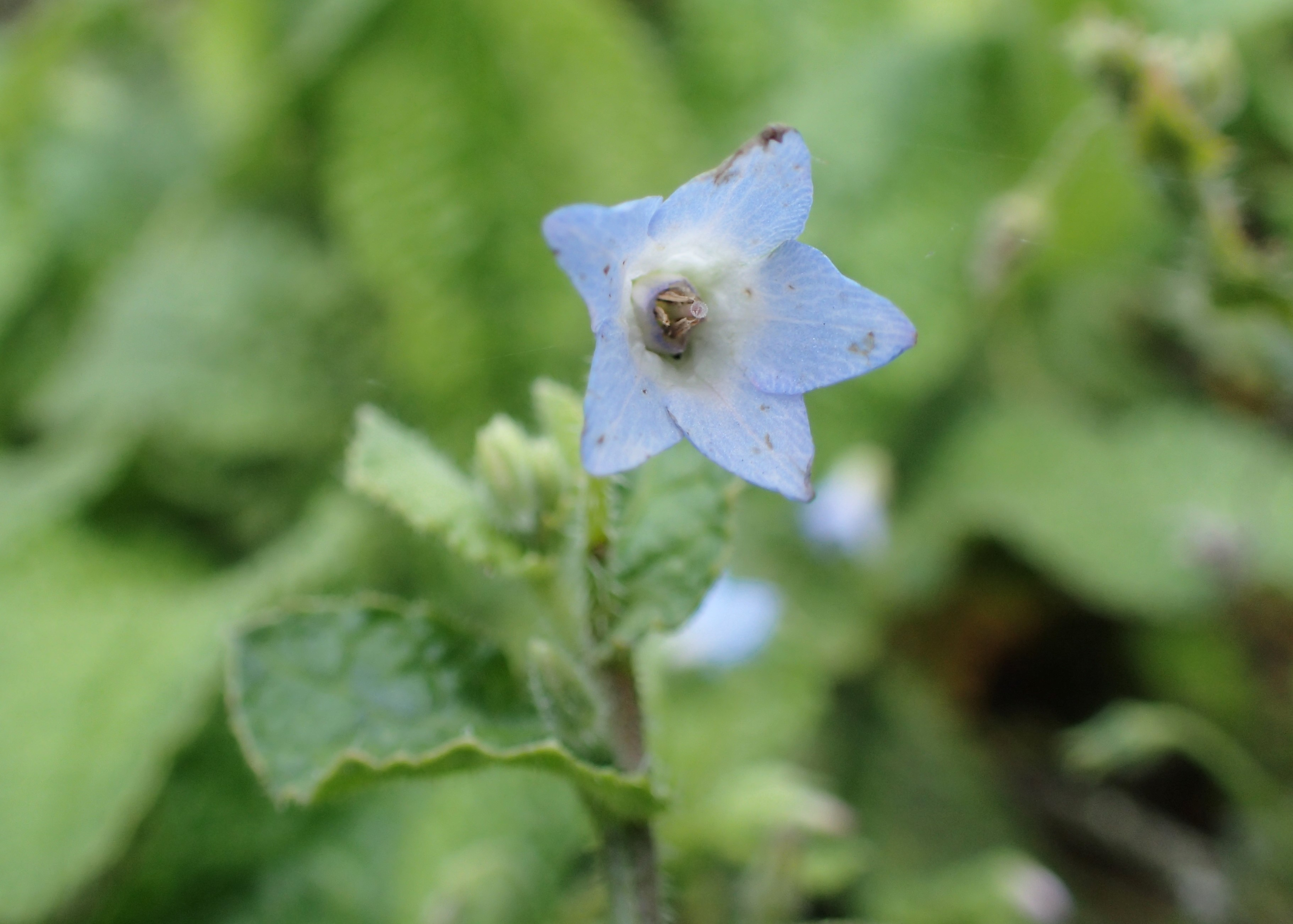

Scientific classification
- Kingdom: Plantae
- Clade: Embryophytes
- Clade: Tracheophytes
- Clade: Spermatophytes
- Clade: Angiosperms
- Clade: Eudicots
- Clade: Asterids
- Order: Boraginales
- Family: Boraginaceae
- Genus: Borago
- Species: B. pygmaea

Binomial name
- Borago pygmaea (Lam. ex DC.) Chater & Greuter (1972)

Synonyms
- Anchusa laxiflora DC. (1805); Campanula pygmaea Lam. ex DC. (1805); Borago laxiflora (DC.) Poir. (1811); Buglossites laxiflorus (DC.) Moris (1845)

= Borago pygmaea =

Species of flowering plant

Borago pygmaea is a species of flowering plant in the family Boraginaceae. It is a biennial or perennial native to the Mediterranean islands of Corsica, Sardinia, and Capraia.
