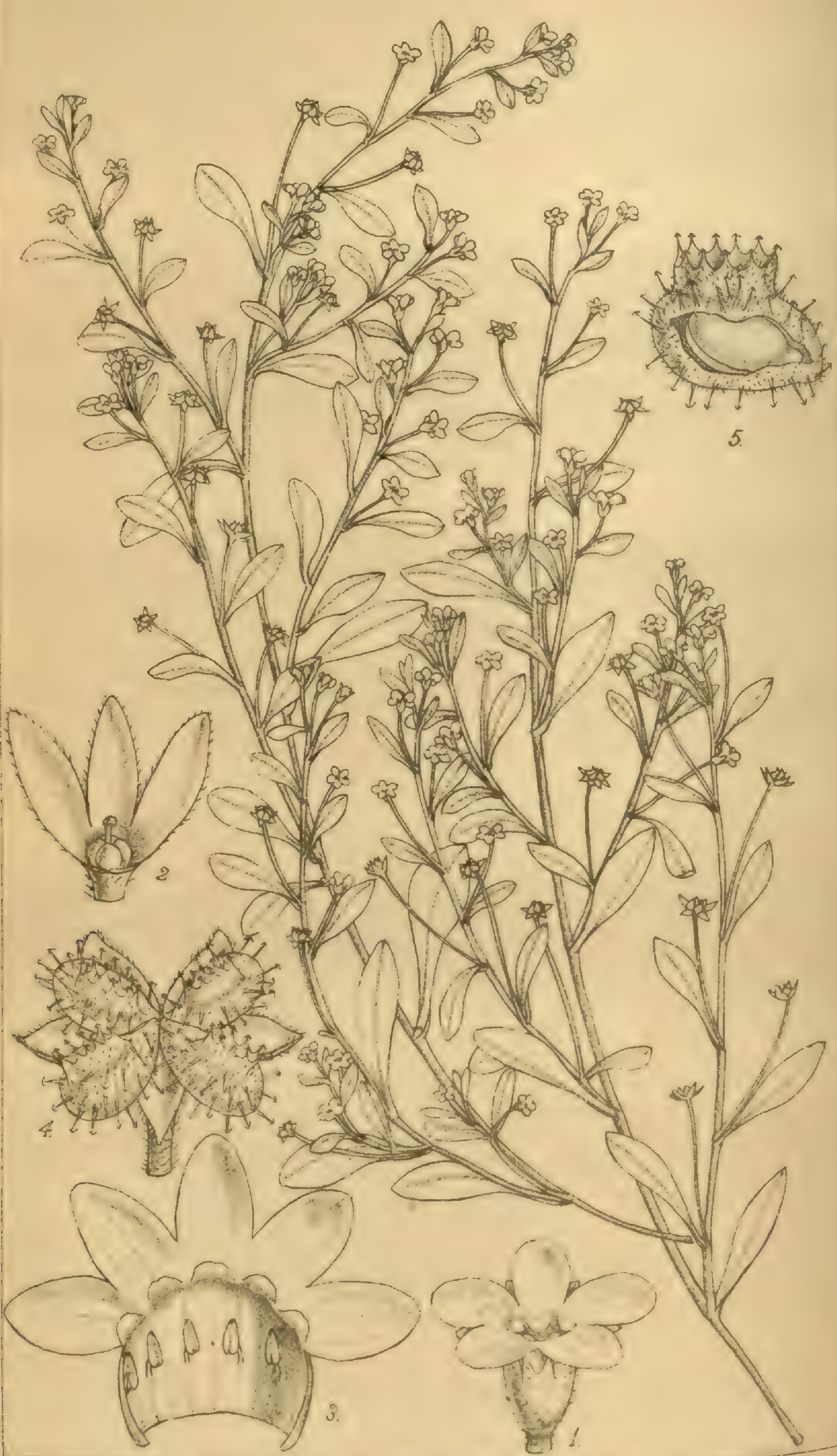
- Actioncarya tibetica

Scientific classification
- Kingdom: Plantae
- Clade: Tracheophytes
- Clade: Angiosperms
- Clade: Eudicots
- Clade: Asterids
- Order: Boraginales
- Family: Boraginaceae
- Subfamily: Boraginoideae
- Genus: Actinocarya; Benth.

Synonyms
- Glochidocaryum W.T.Wang; Metaeritrichium W.T.Wang

= Actinocarya =

Genus of flowering plants

Actinocarya is a small genus of annual herbs in the family Boraginaceae. Species in the genus are found in Pakistan, China, and India.

== Taxonomy ==
The genus is known in China as 锚刺果属 (mao ci guo shu). There are two species in the genus:

- Actinocarya acaulis (W.W.Sm.) I.M.Johnst.
- Actinocarya tibetica C.B.Clarke

== Description ==
The species are annual herbs. They have slender and diffuse stems which sparsely short strigose or subglabrous. Their leaves alternate and are ovate-oblong to spatulate. They have thin pedicels and solitary, axillary flowers. Their calyx is 5-parted, slightly enlarged in fruit, and spreading. Their corolla is rotate-campanulate and the stamens are inserted into its tube; they have five throat appendages and fives lobes of limb spreading. Their ovaries are 4-parted, style are not exserted, and stigmas are subcapitate. They have four nutlets which are narrowly ovoid with glochids.
