= Eritrichium howardii =

Scientific classification
- Kingdom: Plantae
- Clade: Tracheophytes
- Clade: Angiosperms
- Clade: Eudicots
- Clade: Asterids
- Order: Boraginales
- Family: Boraginaceae
- Genus: Eritrichium
- Species: E. howardii

Binomial name
- Eritrichium howardii (A.Gray) Rydb.

Species of flowering plant

Eritrichium howardii, or Howard's alpine forget-me-not, is a rare flowering plant found in the Rocky Mountains area, most notably in Wyoming and Montana. It is a light blue to purplish five-petaled flower with a yellow ring in the middle.

== Description ==
Eritrichum howardii is a densely matted, long-lived perennial herb under 10 centimetres (4 in) tall. The plant often appears stemless. The leaves are densely covered with silvery hairs, and are narrowly oblanceolate with acute tips. The flowers are bright blue and showy, 5 to 9 millimetres (1/4 to 3/8 in) wide, with a yellow center or eye. The flowers are borne in dense clusters at the tip of the stems. The fruit consists of one to four hairy nutlets.

It resembles E. nanum, the leaves of which are more sparsely hairy.

== Distribution and habitat ==
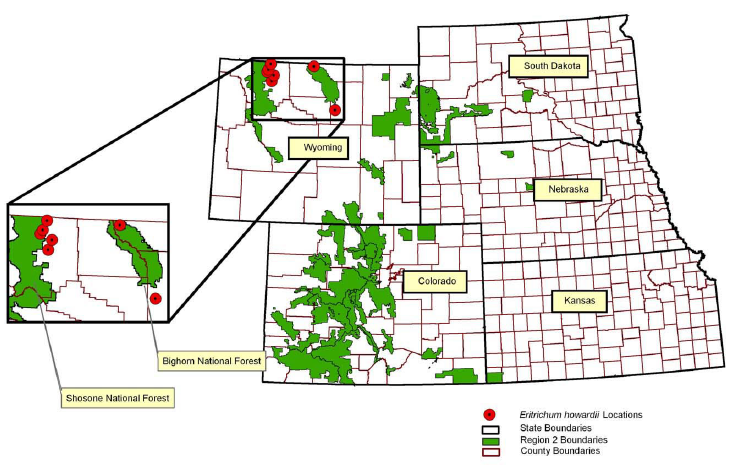
A distribution map for the species

Eritrichium howardii is found in the Rocky Mountain area. It is not a well-studied species, and most information about its distribution comes from informal sightings rather than surveys. The Eritrichium genus is widely distributed through Eurasia, but only three species are found in North America, including E. howardii. Eritrichum howardii’s range lies within the Yellowstone Highlands and Bighorn Mountains sections of the Southern Rocky Mountain Steppe-Open Woodland-Coniferous Forest-Alpine Meadow Province.

Eritrichum howardii is a cushion-like, mat-forming species that tends to occur in more or less open, sparsely vegetated sites with little shade, most often on calcareous soils. In Montana, the species is documented as occurring on open, exposed ridges or grassy slopes. E. howardii is observed in different soil types, including deep red clay, dolomite, and limestone. Elevations range from 1,219–2,651 metres (3,999–8,698 ft).

== Ecology ==
In Montana, it is sometimes associated with Pinus flexilis (limber pine).

== Management ==
The environment described in the Wyoming survey indicates that this plant is most likely quite stress tolerant. It occurs in windswept areas in rough gravely substrate. Potential specific risks that this plant faces are not well understood but, due to its environment, the United States Department of Agriculture assumes that risks may include off-road vehicle recreation, road development, impacts of hikers and pack animals, grazing, and fire. Other potential threats to the species include air pollution (acid rain, nitrogen deposition), extreme weather conditions, and global warming. Eritrichum howardii may also be subject to genetic risk due to the small size and isolated nature of occurrences. Small populations of rare plants may be subject to the deleterious effects of inbreeding or the founder effect. At this time however it does not seem that reliable data on population trends exist for this species, and more study, of this species and others in this climate zone, is needed.
