= Solenanthus reverchonii =

Conservation status
- Critically Endangered (IUCN 3.1)

Scientific classification
- Kingdom: Plantae
- Clade: Tracheophytes
- Clade: Angiosperms
- Clade: Eudicots
- Clade: Asterids
- Order: Boraginales
- Family: Boraginaceae
- Genus: Solenanthus
- Species: S. reverchonii

Binomial name
- Solenanthus reverchonii Degen

Species of plant

Solenanthus reverchonii is a species of plant in the family Boraginaceae. It is endemic to Spain. Its natural habitat is temperate shrubland. It is threatened by habitat loss.
