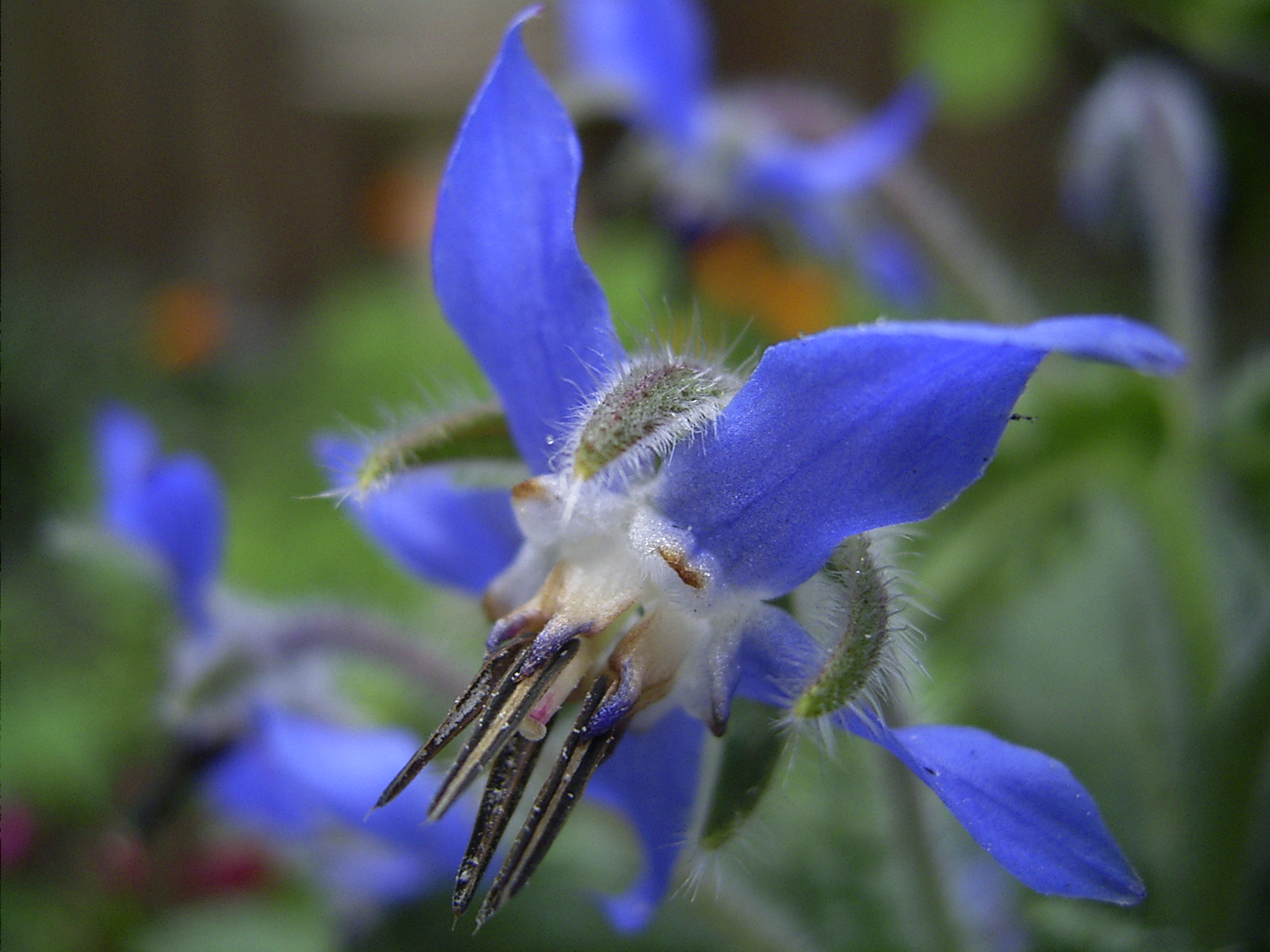
- Borago officinalis flowers

Scientific classification
- Kingdom: Plantae
- Clade: Tracheophytes
- Clade: Angiosperms
- Clade: Eudicots
- Clade: Asterids
- Order: Boraginales
- Family: Boraginaceae
- Subfamily: Boraginoideae
- Genus: Borago; L.

Species
- Borago longifolia Poir. Borago morisiana Bigazzi & Ricceri; Borago officinalis L. Borago pygmaea Chater & Greuter; Borago trabutii Maire

= Borago =

Genus of flowering plants

Borago, or borage, is a genus of five species of herbs native to the Mediterranean, with one species, Borago officinalis, cultivated and naturalized throughout the world.

== Uses ==
Borago officinalis is used medicinally, in companion planting, in cooking, and as an oilseed. Cooked stalks are sometimes eaten as a vegetable. The large, hairy leaves taste mildly of cucumber, and star-shaped purple-blue flowers are prized for their flavour. The leaves are often added to teas and salads, and the flowers have been added to wine (Borage has had a reputation to give one courage since Roman times). The flowers are highly attractive to bees. The hairs covering the plant are said to repel herbivores.

== Description ==
Borages are annual or perennial herbaceous plants with alternate leaves and long-stalked flowers. The inflorescences are branched scorpioid cymes, i.e. subsequent flowers are orientated in a spiral, analogous to the tail of the scorpion.

The corolla is blue or rarely white. Corollas are actinomorphic (star-shaped) with five petals. The corolla tube is short. Throat scales are short, hairless, and emarginated, i.e. with a nick or notch at the apex, standing out from the crown.

The stamens are inserted near the base of the corolla. The anthers are mucronate, with long, pointed appendages, and upright. The stamens protrude through the throat scales The style and capitate stigma do not extend beyond the scales of the throat.

The fruits are obovate nutlets, 7–10 mm, with a thick, ring-shaped collar at the base. Seeds are dispersed by ants.

== Distribution ==
The species of this genus are found in cultivated and rocky areas through the southwestern Mediterranean. The genus is monophyletic and very close genetically to the sister genus Symphytum. Four of the five species are found only in northwest Africa, Corsica, Sardinia, and the Tuscan Archipelago. Only B. officinalis is widely cultivated, and has become naturalized through much of the temperate world (e.g. Argentina, Canada, Chile, United States, Mexico, and Paraguay). B. officinalis was once thought to be native to Syria, but it is probably of North African origin, where other Borago species occur. It is often grown as ornamental.

== Species ==
The genus comprises five species in two subgenera:

Subgenus Borago is characterized by erect herbaceous, wheel-shaped flowers, blue, sometimes white:

- Borago officinalis cultivated throughout the world, native to North Africa
- Borago trabutii endemic to the High Atlas and the Anti-Atlas, Morocco
- Borago longifolia endemic to northern Algeria and Tunisia

Subgenus Buglossites is prostrate and has bright, bell-shaped flowers:

- Borago pygmaea sometimes cultivated, native to Corsica, Sardinia, and the island of Capraia
- Borago morisiana endemic to the island of San Pietro in southwestern Sardinia
