= Suchtelenia calycina =

Scientific classification
- Kingdom: Plantae
- Clade: Tracheophytes
- Clade: Angiosperms
- Clade: Eudicots
- Clade: Asterids
- Order: Boraginales
- Family: Boraginaceae
- Genus: Suchtelenia
- Species: S. calycina

Binomial name
- Suchtelenia calycina (C.A.Mey.) DC. (1846)

Synonyms
- Cynoglossum calycinum C.A.Mey. (1831)

Species of flowering plant

Suchtelenia calycina is a species of flowering plant in the family Boraginaceae. It is an annual native to Iran, Kazakhstan, Turkmenistan, and Uzbekistan.

The genus name of Suchtelenia is in honour of Paul van Suchtelen (1788–1833), a Dutch-born Russian military officer. The Latin specific epithet of calycina is derived from the Greek calycinus, meaning "like a calyx" or "with a prominent calyx". It was first described and published in Pl. Vasc. Gen. Vol.1 on page 188 in 1839. The species was published in Prodr. Vol.10 on page 163 in 1846.

== Varieties ==
Two varieties are accepted.

- Suchtelenia calycina var. acanthocarpa (Kar.) Kuntze – Turkmenistan
- Suchtelenia calycina var. calycina – Iran, Kazakhstan, Turkmenistan, and Uzbekistan. It has 3 known synonyms; Suchtelenia cerinthifolia Kar. ex Meisn., Suchtelenia eriophora Bornm. and Suchtelenia uniserialis Ledeb..
