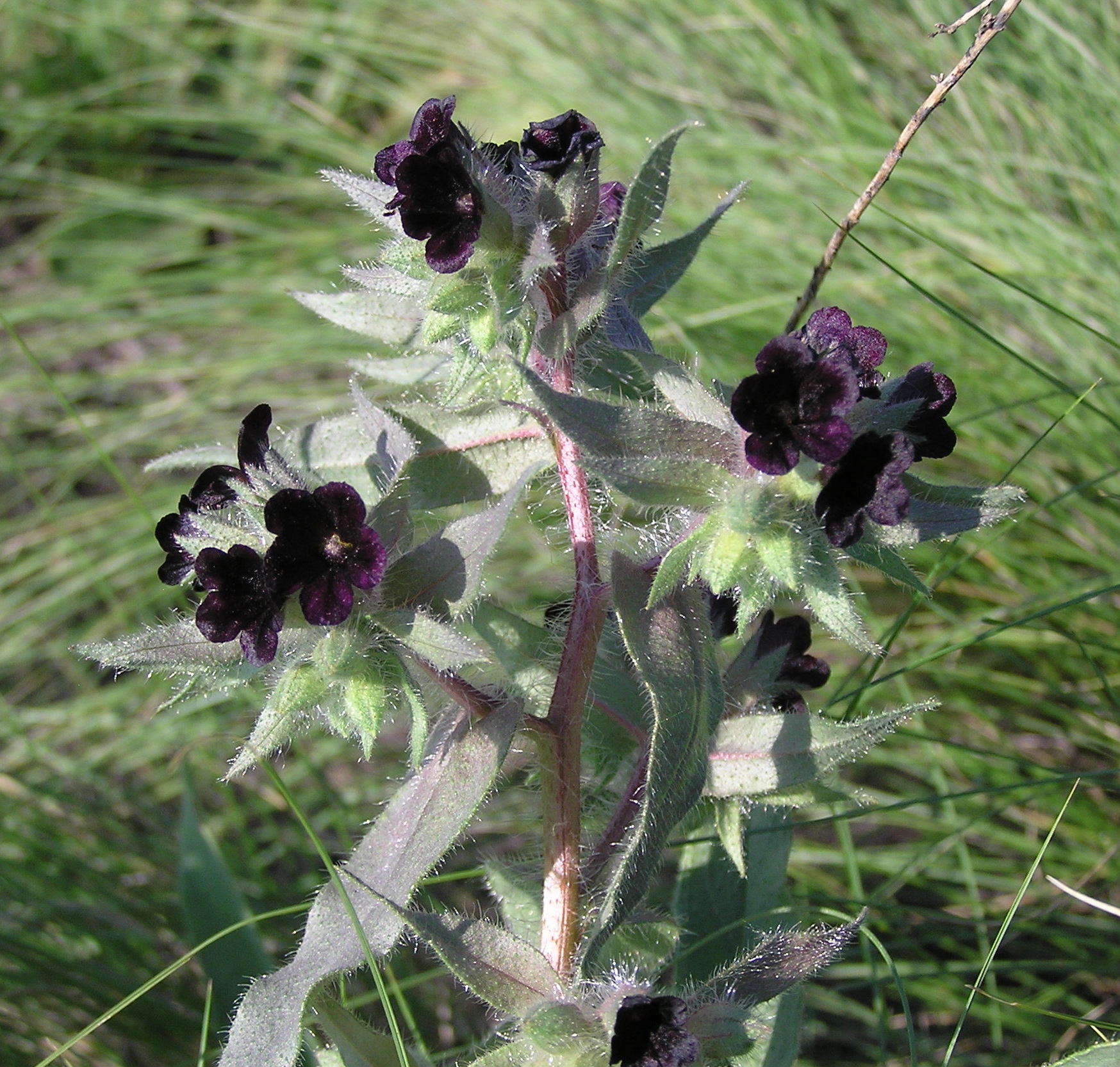
- Nonea rossica

Scientific classification
- Kingdom: Plantae
- Clade: Embryophytes
- Clade: Tracheophytes
- Clade: Spermatophytes
- Clade: Angiosperms
- Clade: Eudicots
- Clade: Asterids
- Order: Boraginales
- Family: Boraginaceae
- Subfamily: Boraginoideae
- Genus: Nonea; Medik.

Synonyms
- Aipyanthus Steven; Echioides Tourn. ex Desf; Elizaldia Willk.; Massartina Maire; Nephrocarya Candargy; Nonnia St.-Lag.; Onochilis Mart.; Oskampia Baill.

= Nonea =

Genus of flowering plants in the borage family

Nonea is a genus of flowering plants in the family Boraginaceae. Sometimes known as monkswort, these are herbaceous perennials or annual plants, native to Europe, Asia and Africa.

The leaves are grayish-green, and the plants are hairy all over.

== Species ==
Nonea includes 45 accepted species.

- Nonea alpestris G.Don
- Nonea anchusoides Boiss. & Buhse
- Nonea anomala Hausskn. & Bornm.
- Nonea armeniaca (Kusn.) Grossh.
- Nonea calceolaris Nikif. & Pazij
- Nonea calycina (Roem. & Schult.) Selvi, Bigazzi, Hilger & Papini
- Nonea caspica (Willd.) G.Don
- Nonea decurrens G.Don
- Nonea dumanii Bilgili & Selvi
- Nonea echioides (L.) Roem. & Schult.
- Nonea edgeworthii DC.
- Nonea flavescens (C.A.Mey.) Fisch. & C.A.Mey.
- Nonea heterostemon Murb.
- Nonea hypoleia Bornm.
- Nonea intermedia Ledeb.
- Nonea iranica Falat. & Pakravan
- Nonea kandaharensis Riedl
- Nonea karsensis Popov
- Nonea longiflora Wettst.
- Nonea lutea Desr.) DC.
- Nonea macrantha (Riedl) A.Baytop
- Nonea macropoda Popov
- Nonea macrosperma Boiss. & Heldr.
- Nonea melanocarpa Boiss.
- Nonea micrantha Boiss. & Reut.
- Nonea minutiflora Riedl
- Nonea monticola (Rech.f.) Selvi & Bigazzi
- Nonea ovczinnikovii Czukav.
- Nonea pallens Petrovic
- Nonea palmyrensis (Post) Sam.
- Nonea persica Boiss.
- Nonea philistaea Boiss.
- Nonea pisidica Selvi, Bigazzi & Hilger
- Nonea polychroma Selvi & Bigazzi
- Nonea × popovii Gusul. & Tarn.
- Nonea pulla (L.) DC.
- Nonea pulmonarioides Boiss. & Balansa
- Nonea rosea (M.Bieb.) Link
- Nonea rossica Steven
- Nonea setosa Roem. & Schult.
- Nonea stenosolen Boiss. & Balansa
- Nonea taurica Ledeb.
- Nonea turcomanica Popov
- Nonea versicolor (Steven) Sweet
- Nonea vesicaria (L.) Rchb.
- Nonea vivianii DC.
