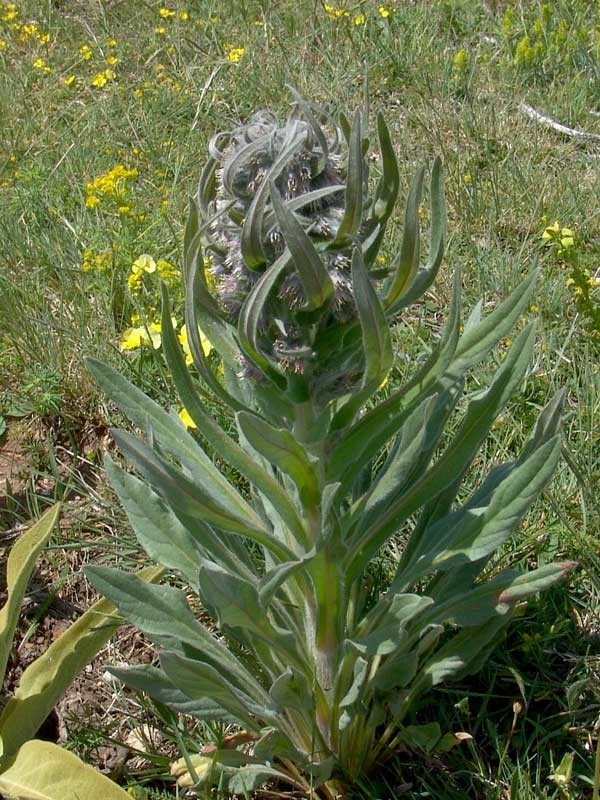
- Solenanthus apenninus

Scientific classification
- Kingdom: Plantae
- Clade: Embryophytes
- Clade: Tracheophytes
- Clade: Spermatophytes
- Clade: Angiosperms
- Clade: Eudicots
- Clade: Asterids
- Order: Boraginales
- Family: Boraginaceae
- Subfamily: Boraginoideae
- Genus: Solenanthus; Ledeb.

Type species
- Solenanthus circinnatus Ledeb.

= Solenanthus =

Genus of flowering plants in the borage family

Solenanthus is a genus of flowering plants in the family Boraginaceae.

Species include:

- Solenanthus albanicus, (Degen & Bald.) Degen & Bald.
- Solenanthus apenninus, (L.) Fisch. & C.A.Mey.
- Solenanthus biebersteinii, DC.
- Solenanthus circinnatus, Ledeb.
- Solenanthus formosus, R.R.Mill
- Solenanthus hupehensis, R.R.Mill
- Solenanthus lanatus, (L.) A.DC.
- Solenanthus minimus, Brand
- Solenanthus pindicus, Aldén
- Solenanthus reverchonii, Degen
- Solenanthus scardicus, Bornm.
- Solenanthus stamineus, (Desf.)Wettst
- Solenanthus turkestanicus, (Regel & Smirnov) Kusn.
