= Moritzia =

Scientific classification
- Kingdom: Plantae
- Clade: Tracheophytes
- Clade: Angiosperms
- Clade: Eudicots
- Clade: Asterids
- Order: Boraginales
- Family: Boraginaceae
- Genus: Moritzia; DC. ex Meisn.

Synonyms
- Meratia A.DC.

Genus of plants

Moritzia is a genus of flowering plants belonging to the family Boraginaceae.

Its native range is Costa Rica to southern tropical America. It is found in Brazil, Colombia, Costa Rica, Ecuador, Panamá, Peru and Venezuela.

The genus name of Moritzia is in honour of Alexander Moritzi (1806–1850), a Swiss naturalist and early proponent of evolution. It was first described and published in Pl. Vasc. Gen. Vol.1 on page 280 in 1840.

== Species ==
According to Kew:

- Moritzia ciliata (Cham.) DC. ex Meisn.
- Moritzia dusenii I.M.Johnst.
- Moritzia lindenii (A.DC.) Benth. ex Gürke
