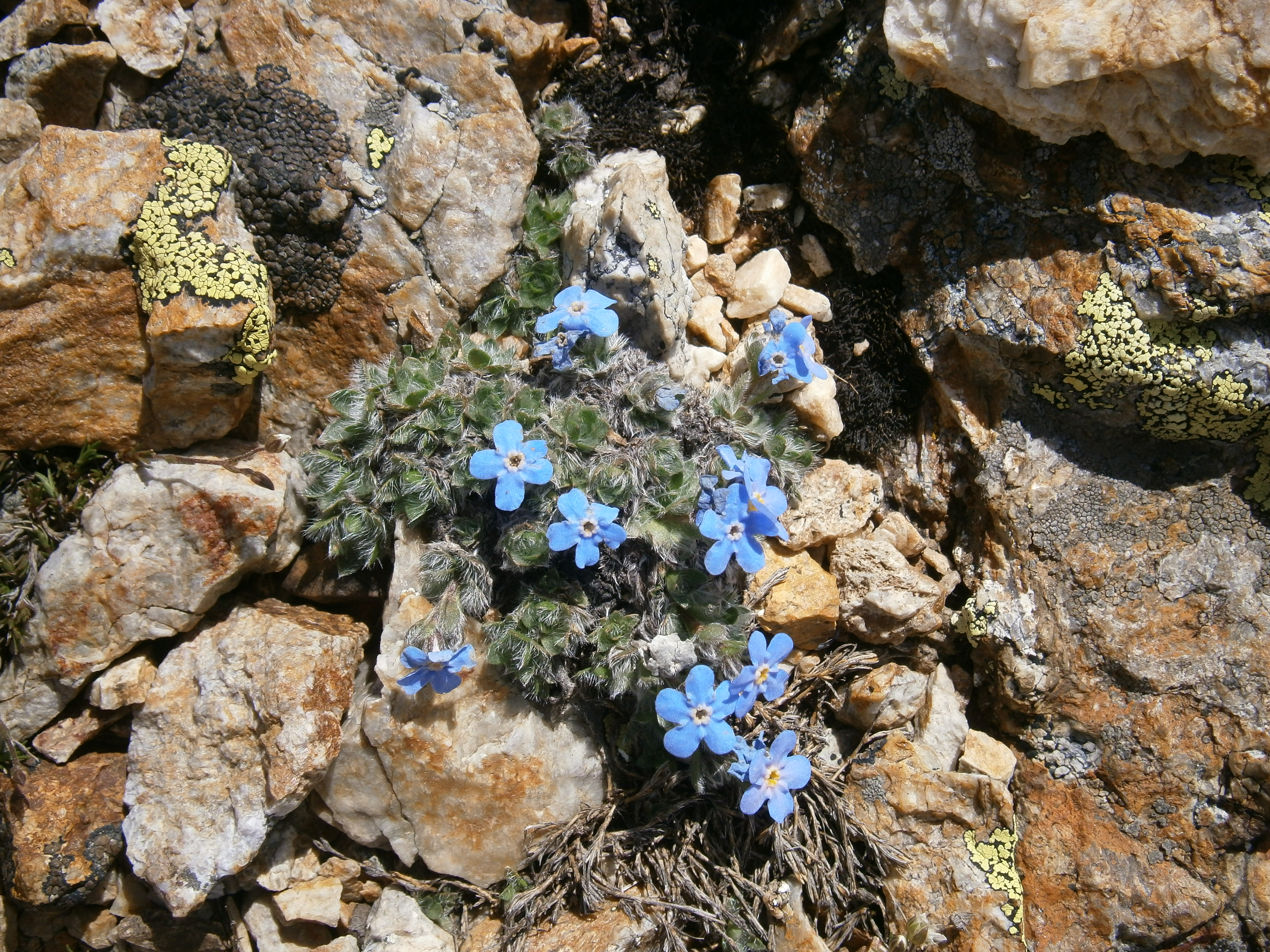
- Eritrichium nanum growing in the Grandes Rousses, Oisans, France

Scientific classification
- Kingdom: Plantae
- Clade: Tracheophytes
- Clade: Angiosperms
- Clade: Eudicots
- Clade: Asterids
- Order: Boraginales
- Family: Boraginaceae
- Genus: Eritrichium
- Species: E. nanum

Binomial name
- Eritrichium nanum (L.) Schrad. ex Gaudin

= Eritrichium nanum =

Species of flowering plant

Eritrichium nanum, the arctic alpine forget-me-not or king-of-the-Alps, is a circumpolar alpine cushion plant which occurs in the European Alps and the North American Rocky Mountains.

== Description ==
This cushion plant grows up to 10 centimetres (4 in) tall. It forms tufts of lanceolate leaves up to 1.5 centimetres (1/2 in) long. Blooming from June to August, the deep blue corollas are five-lobed and funnel-shaped; five yellow pads surround the inner tube opening. The fruit is divided into four nutlets.

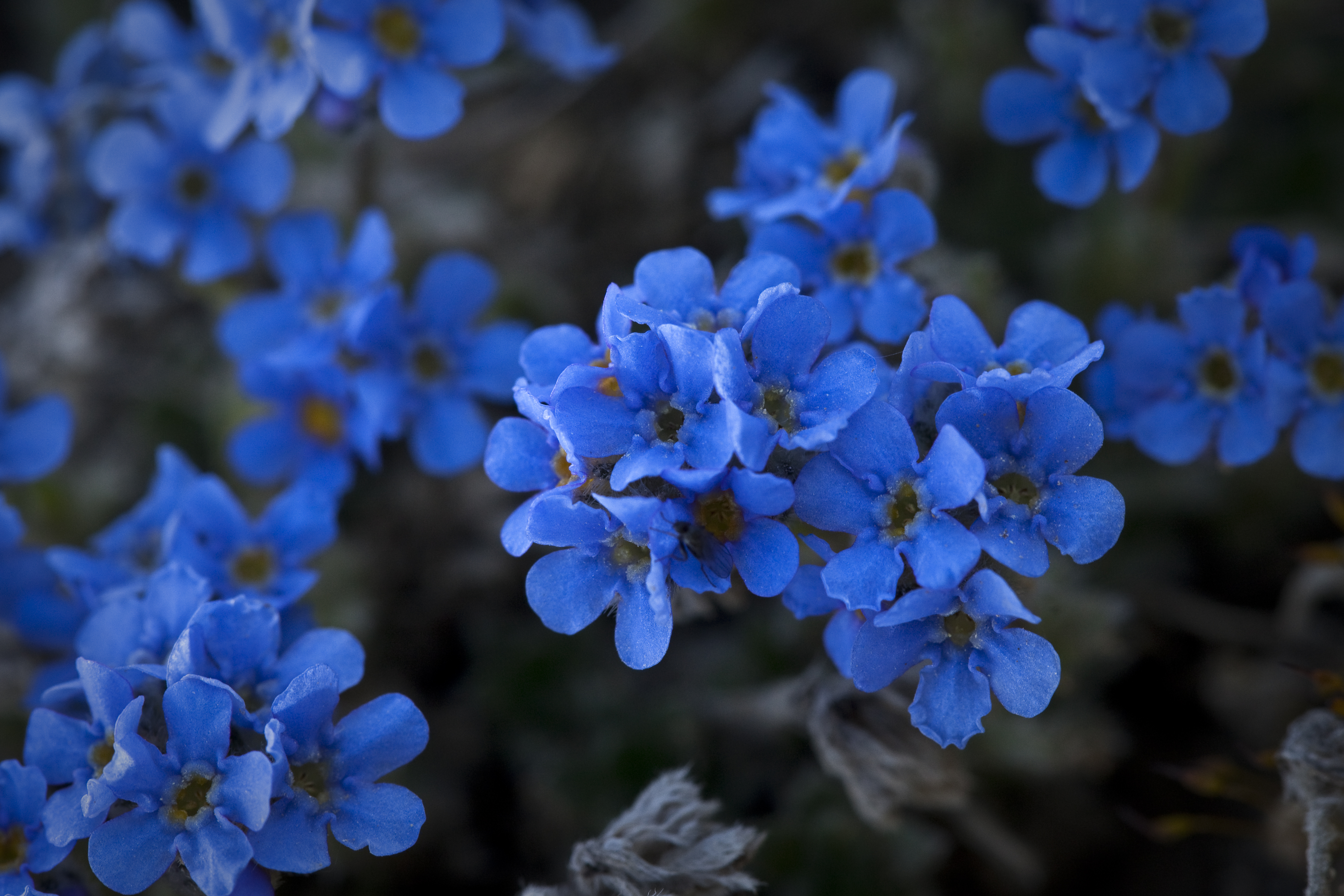
Eritrichium nanum var. aretioides in Alaska

=== Similar species ===
Eritrichium howardii is similar, but has hairs dense enough to cover the leaves.

== Distribution and habitat ==
The plant occurs in the European Alps and western North America from Alaska and along the Rocky Mountains to Oregon, Montana and New Mexico. It grows at elevations of 10,000 feet in an environment of acid rocks, snow gullies and receding glaciers.
