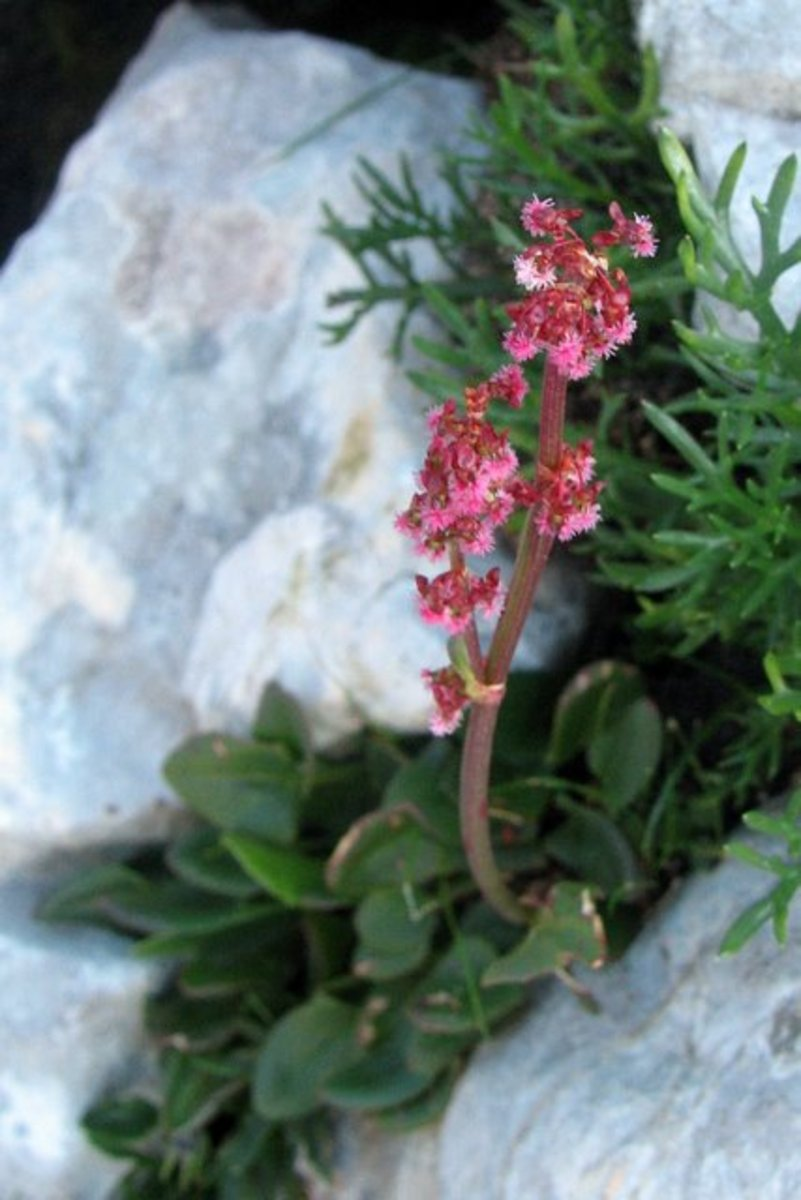

Scientific classification
- Kingdom: Plantae
- Clade: Tracheophytes
- Clade: Angiosperms
- Clade: Eudicots
- Order: Caryophyllales
- Family: Polygonaceae
- Genus: Rumex
- Species: R. nivalis

Binomial name
- Rumex nivalis Hegetschw.

= Rumex nivalis =

Species of flowering plant

Rumex nivalis, commonly called snow dock, is a species of flowering plant in the knotweed family. It is endemic to Europe, where it grows mainly in snowbeds. It is dioecious, with separate male and female plants.

The plant was first discovered by Alexander Moritzi in 1836 in the Swiss Alps. It is most plentiful at 7000 feet above sea level.
