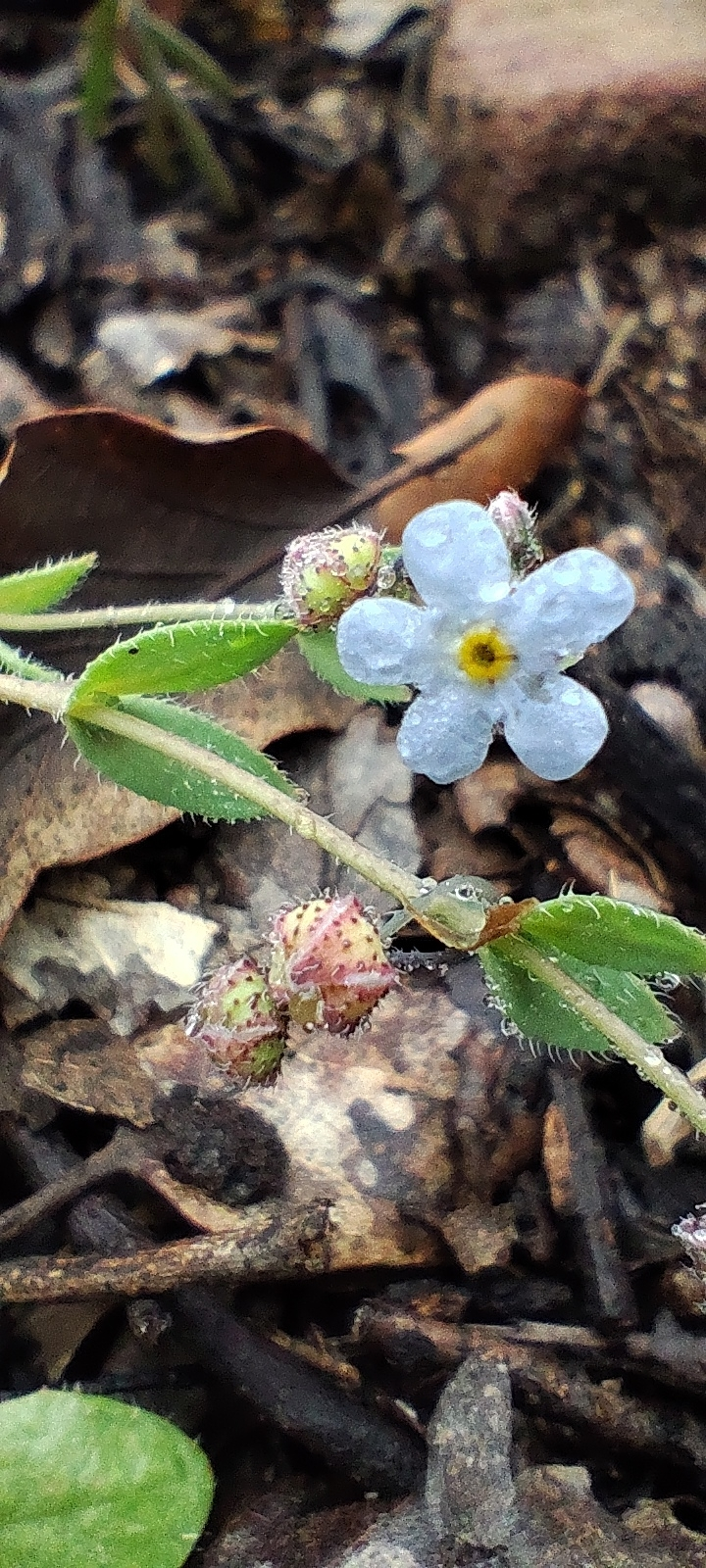
- Flowers and fruits of Gyrocaryum oppositifolium

Conservation status
- Critically Endangered (IUCN 3.1)

Scientific classification
- Kingdom: Plantae
- Clade: Embryophytes
- Clade: Tracheophytes
- Clade: Spermatophytes
- Clade: Angiosperms
- Clade: Eudicots
- Clade: Asterids
- Order: Boraginales
- Family: Boraginaceae
- Genus: Gyrocaryum; Valdés
- Species: G. oppositifolium

Binomial name
- Gyrocaryum oppositifolium Valdés

= Gyrocaryum =

Genus of flowering plants in the borage family

Gyrocaryum is a genus of plant in family Boraginaceae. It contains a single species, Gyrocaryum oppositifolium, which is endemic to Spain. The genus and species were described by Spanish botanist Benito Valdés in 1983. It was considered to be extinct in Andalucía until a population was found in 2025.

== Taxonomy ==
Gyrocaryum is a genus of plant in family Boraginaceae which contains one species, G. oppositifolium, which is endemic to Spain. The genus and species were described in 1983 by Spanish botanist Benito Valdés in the journal Willdenowia. The genus name comprises two latinized Greek words, "gyros" for ring and "caryos" for nut, and was chosen to highlight its distinguishing characteristic, namely the presence of a cartilaginous ring on the fruit. The holotype specimen was collected in Seville in 1982 by Valdés and colleagues, and is housed at herbarium at the University of Seville (herbarium SEV) (SEV 80501).

Since its description, it was thought to be extinct in Andalucía, but a population was found in Sierra Morena National Park in southern Spain in 2025.

== Distribution ==
Its natural habitats are Mediterranean Matorral shrubland, and temperate bunchgrass-grassland. It is threatened by habitat loss.

== Gallery ==
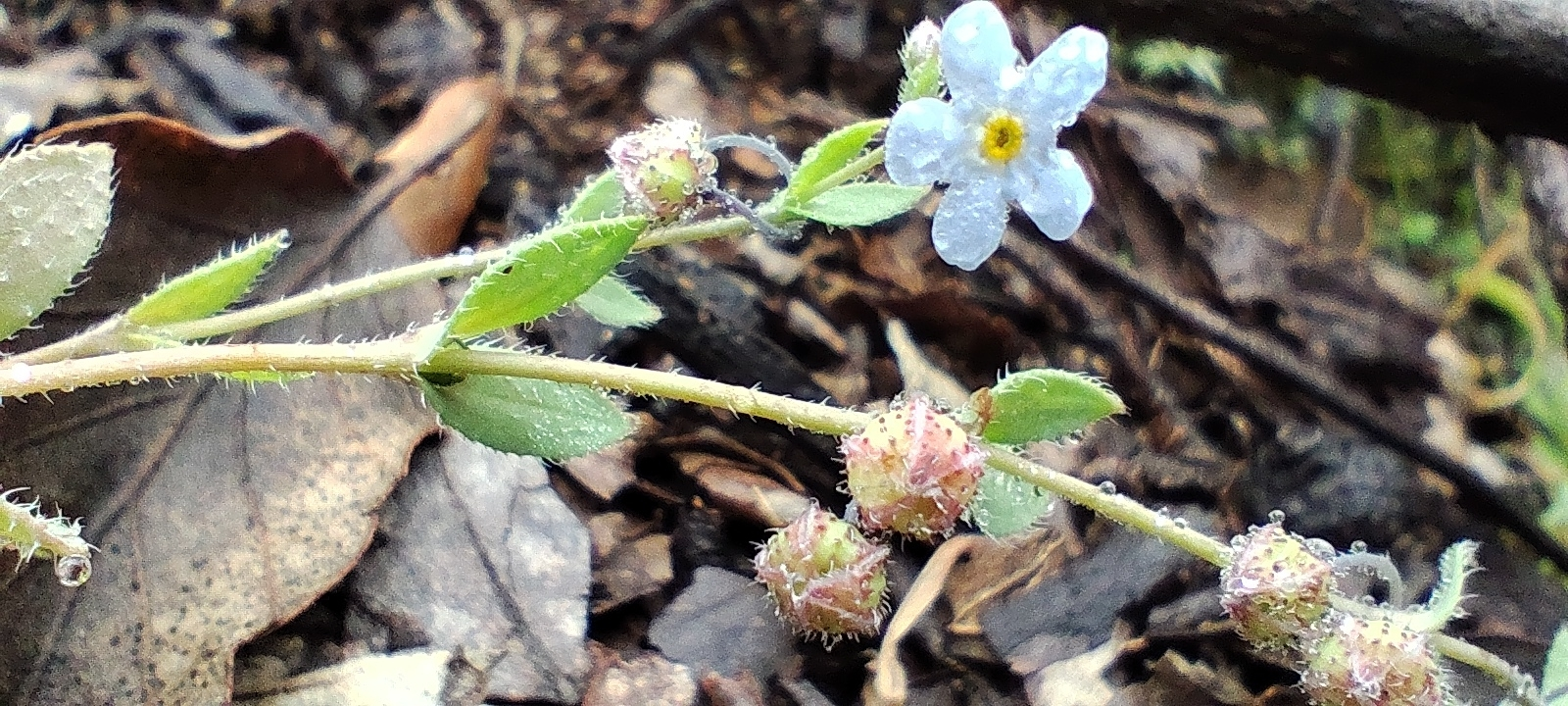
Flower, fruits and bracts
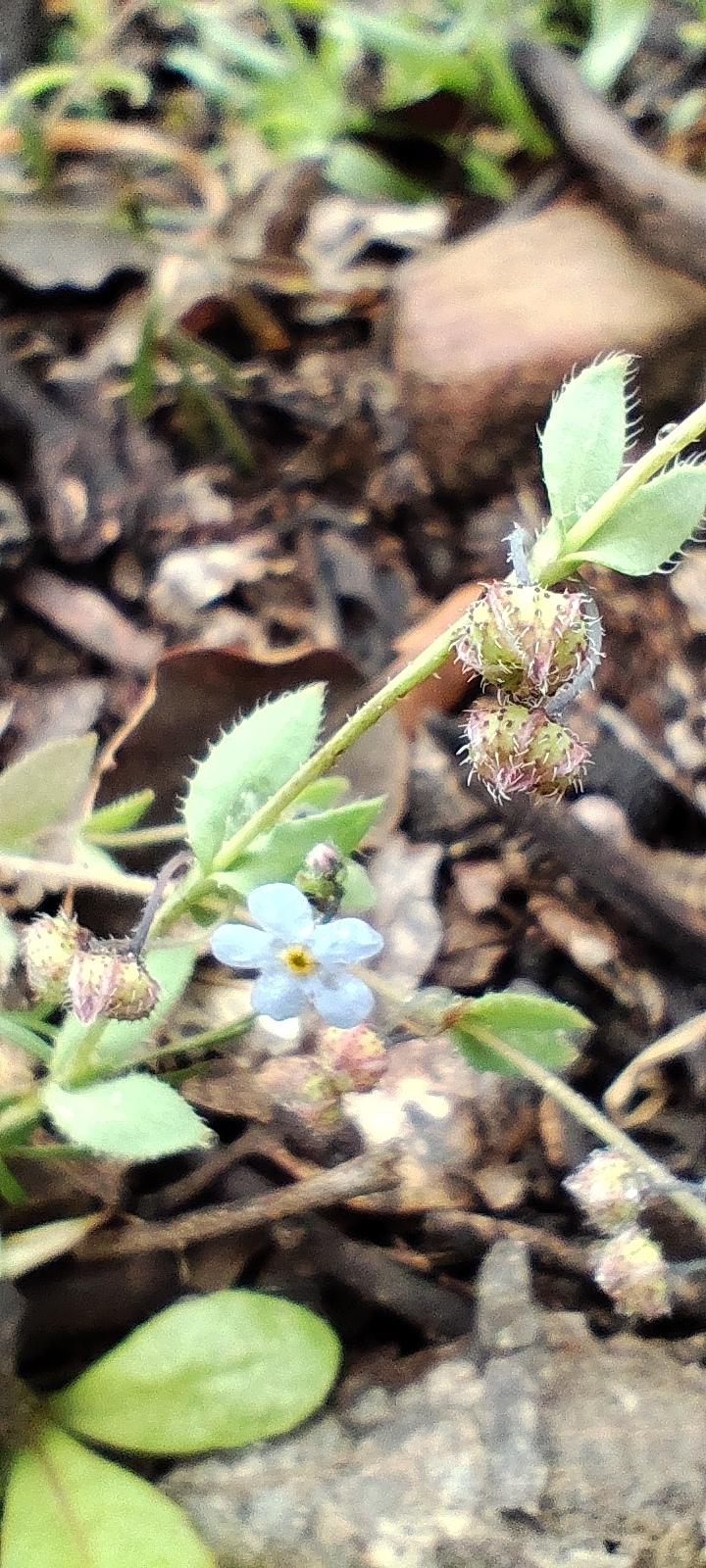
Flower, fruits and bracts

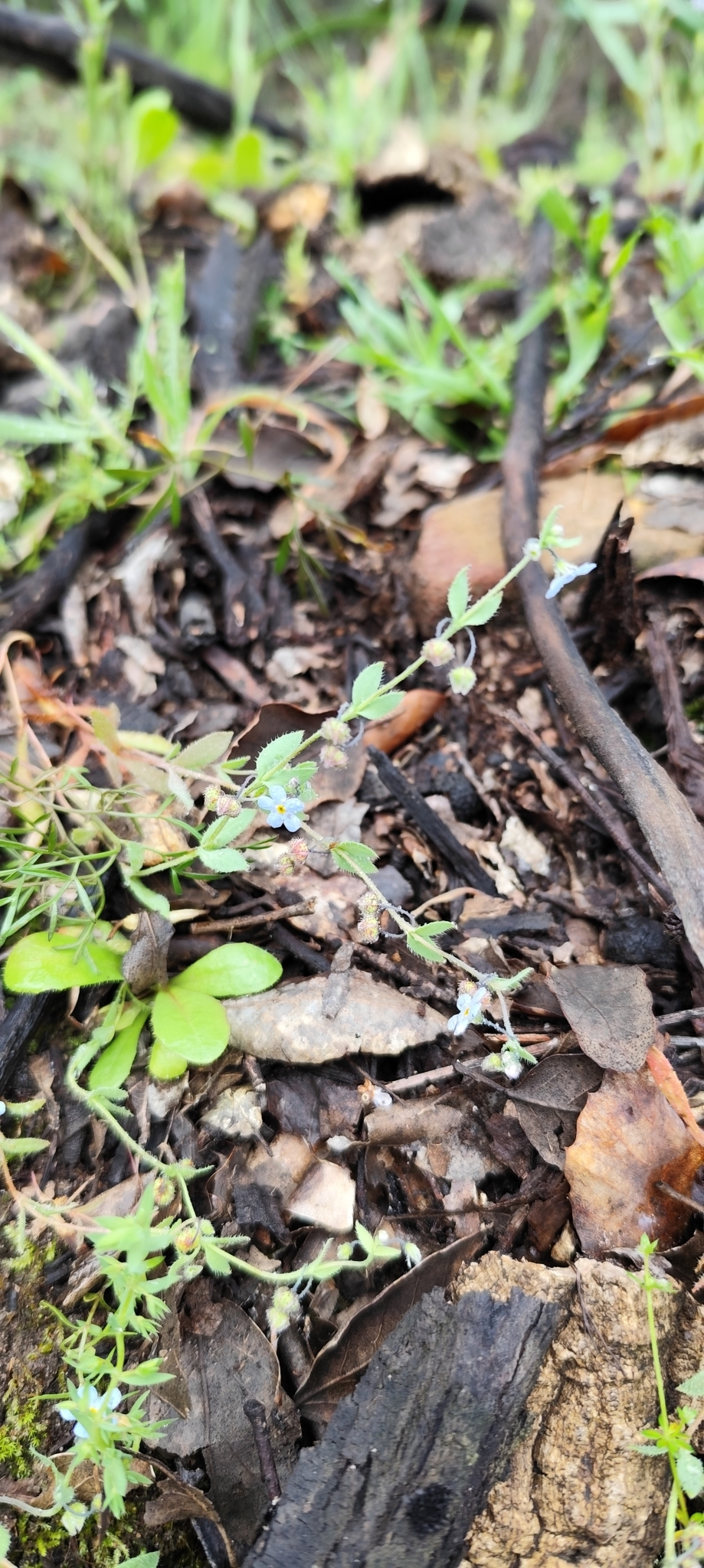
Habit

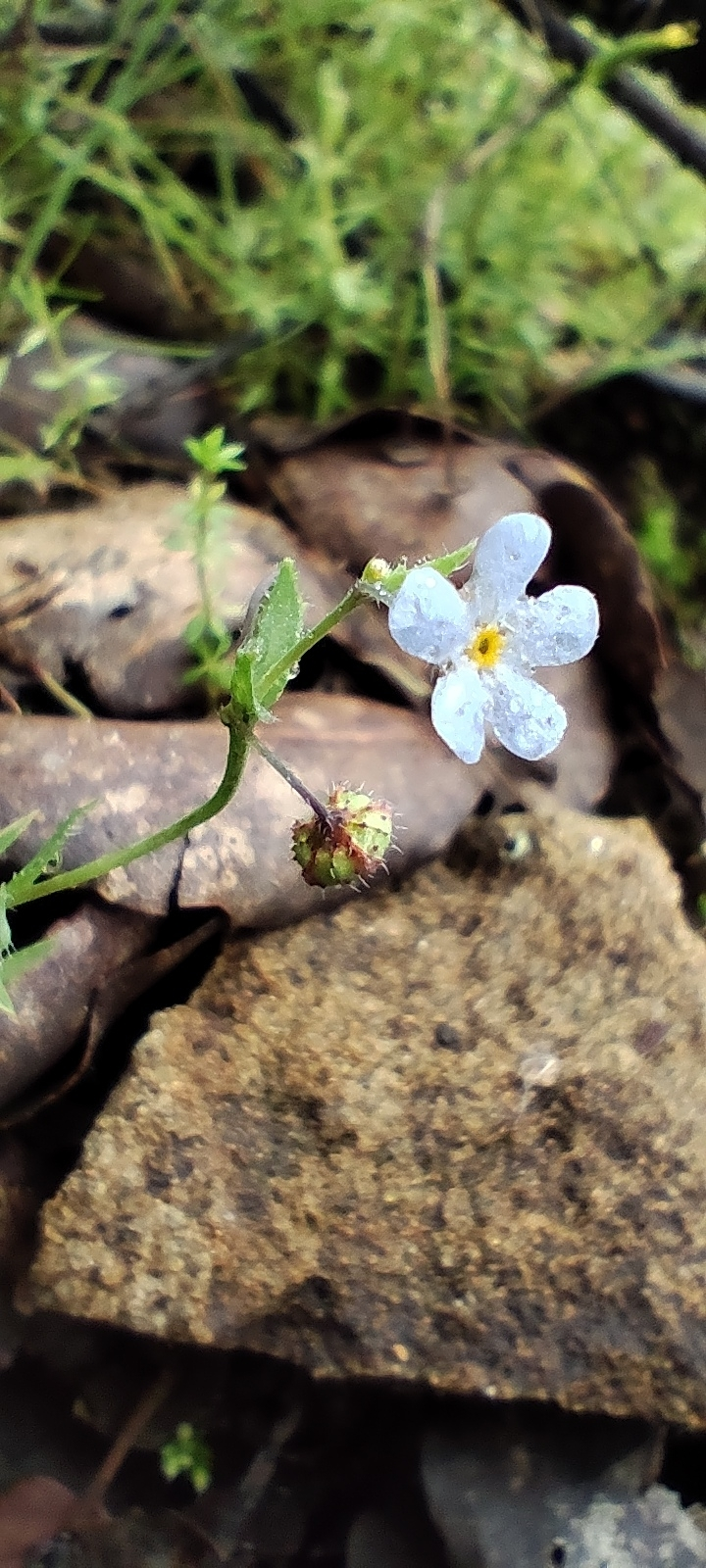
Flower and fruit
