= Alexander Moritzi =

Swiss naturalist (1806–1850)

Alexander Moritzi (1806–1850) was a Swiss naturalist and early proponent of evolution.

Moritzi born in Chur, Graubünden. His Réflexions sur l'espèce en histoire naturelle, which means "Reflections on Species in Natural History," was published in 1842 and republished in 1934. This book, which contains many observations on animals and plants, advocated transmutation of species and is considered a forerunner of the theory of evolution developed by Charles Darwin. However, the book was ignored and did not make an impact like Darwin's.

Snow dock was first discovered by Moritzi in 1836 in the Swiss Alps.

In 1840, DC. ex Meisn. published Moritzia a genus of flowering plants from South America, belonging to the family Boraginaceae in Moritzi's honour.

Alexander Moritzi cooperated with the Swiss botanist Heinrich Zollinger and supported him with the issue and selling of his two series of specimens which superficially resemble exsiccatae, namely Plantae Javanicae 1843–1847 and Plantae Japonicae 1847.

== Selected publications ==
- Réflexions sur l'espèce en histoire naturelle (1842)
