= Mattiastrum =

Scientific classification
- Kingdom: Plantae
- Clade: Tracheophytes
- Clade: Angiosperms
- Clade: Eudicots
- Clade: Asterids
- Order: Boraginales
- Family: Boraginaceae
- Genus: Mattiastrum (Boiss.) Brand

Genus of plants

Mattiastrum is a genus of flowering plants belonging to the family Boraginaceae.

Its native range is Crete to Pakistan. It is found in Afghanistan, Cyprus, East Aegean Is., Iran, Iraq, Kazakhstan, Lebanon-Syria, Pakistan, Palestine and Turkey.

The genus name of Mattiastrum is in honour of Elisabeth von Matt (1762–1814), an Austrian astronomer who is regarded as the only female scientist to have her observations published in European astronomy journals during the late 18th and early 19th century. It was first described and published in Repert. Spec. Nov. Regni Veg. Vol.14 on page 150 in 1915.

== Known species ==
According to Kew:

- Mattiastrum amani Rech.f.
- Mattiastrum artvinense (R.R.Mill) Valdés
- Mattiastrum asperum (Stocks) Brand
- Mattiastrum aucheri (DC. & A.DC.) Brand
- Mattiastrum badghysii Sadat
- Mattiastrum calycinum (Boiss. & Balansa) Brand
- Mattiastrum cappadocicum (Boiss. & Balansa) Brand
- Mattiastrum corymbiforme (DC.) Brand
- Mattiastrum cristatum (Schreb.) Brand
- Mattiastrum dielsii Bornm.
- Mattiastrum dieterlei Sadat
- Mattiastrum erysimifolium (Boiss.) Brand
- Mattiastrum flaviflorum Rech.f. & Riedl
- Mattiastrum formosum Rech.f. & Riedl
- Mattiastrum incanum (Ledeb.) Brand
- Mattiastrum karakoricum Podlech & Sadat
- Mattiastrum karataviense (Pavlov ex Popov) Czerep.
- Mattiastrum kurdistanicum Brand
- Mattiastrum lamprocarpum (Boiss.) Brand
- Mattiastrum laxiflorum (Trautv.) Czerep.
- Mattiastrum leptophyllum (DC.) Brand
- Mattiastrum lithospermifolium (Lam.) Brand
- Mattiastrum longipes (Boiss.) Brand
- Mattiastrum luristanicum (Nábelek) Bornm.
- Mattiastrum modestum (Boiss. & Hausskn.) Brand
- Mattiastrum montbretii Riedl
- Mattiastrum multicaule Rech.f. & Riedl
- Mattiastrum paphlagonicum Bornm.
- Mattiastrum polycarpum Rech.f.
- Mattiastrum racemosum (Schreb.) Brand
- Mattiastrum reuteri (Boiss. & Hausskn.) Brand
- Mattiastrum sessiliflorum Rech.f. & Riedl
- Mattiastrum shepardii (Post & Beauverd) Valdés
- Mattiastrum stenolophum (Boiss.) Brand
- Mattiastrum subscaposum Rech.f. & Riedl
- Mattiastrum turcicum Hamzaoğlu
