= Suchtelenia =

Scientific classification
- Kingdom: Plantae
- Clade: Tracheophytes
- Clade: Angiosperms
- Clade: Eudicots
- Clade: Asterids
- Order: Boraginales
- Family: Boraginaceae
- Genus: Suchtelenia; Kar. ex Meisn. (1839)

Species
- Six; see text

Synonyms
- Heterocaryum A.DC. (1846); Pseudoheterocaryum Kaz.Osaloo & Saadati (2017)

Genus of flowering plants

Suchtelenia is a genus of flowering plant belonging to the family Boraginaceae. It contains six species native to western Asia, the Arabian Peninsula, Central Asia, the Caucasus, and southern European Russia.

The genus name of Suchtelenia is in honour of Paul van Suchtelen (1788–1833), a Dutch-born Russian military officer. The genus was first described and published in Pl. Vasc. Gen. Vol.1 on page 188 in 1839.

== Species ==
Six species are accepted.

- Suchtelenia calycina (C.A.Mey.) DC. – Iran, Kazakhstan, Turkmenistan, and Uzbekistan
- Suchtelenia echinophora (Pall.) Sennikov – southern European Russia and Kazakhstan
- Suchtelenia laevigata (Kar. & Kir.) Sennikov – Central Asia, Iran, Afghanistan, and western Pakistan
- Suchtelenia macrocarpa (Zakirov) Sennikov – Central Asia, Afghanistan, Iran, Iraq, and the Caucasus
- Suchtelenia subsessilis (Vatke) Sennikov – Central Asia, Afghanistan, Pakistan, Iran, Iraq, and southern Israel
- Suchtelenia szovitsiana (Fisch. & C.A.Mey.) Sennikov – Central Asia, Afghanistan, Pakistan, Western Himalaya, Western Asia, and the Arabian Peninsula
