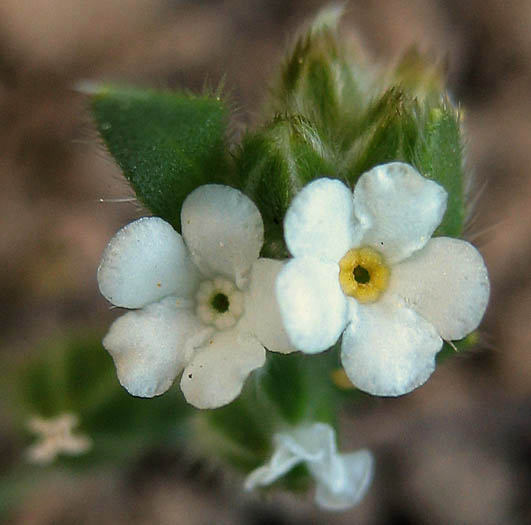
- Eritrichium canescens

Scientific classification
- Kingdom: Plantae
- Clade: Tracheophytes
- Clade: Angiosperms
- Clade: Eudicots
- Clade: Asterids
- Order: Boraginales
- Family: Boraginaceae
- Subfamily: Boraginoideae
- Genus: Eritrichium; Schrad. ex Gaudin

Type species
- Eritrichium nanum (L.) Schrad. ex Gaudin

Species
- 78 accepted species

= Eritrichium =

Genus of flowering plants in the borage family

Eritrichium (alpine forget-me-not) is a genus of flowering plants in the family Boraginaceae. It contains 78 species. Notable members include Eritrichium howardii and Eritrichium nanum.

Its native range stretches from temperate Eurasia, across Alaska to the western central U.S. It is found in Europe (within Austria, France, Italy, Romania, Switzerland and Yugoslavia), in Siberia, (within Altay, Buryatiya, Chita, Krasnoyarsk and Tuva,) in Central Asia (within Kazakhstan, Kyrgyzstan, Tajikistan, Turkmenistan and Uzbekistan), in Western Asia (within Afghanistan, East Himalaya, Iran, Pakistan and West Himalaya), in China (within Inner Mongolia, Manchuria, Nepal, Qinghai, Tibet and Xinjiang,) in Eastern Asia (with Japan and Korea,) in Canada (within Northwest Territories and Yukon) and also in the U.S. (within Alaska, Colorado, Idaho, Montana, New Mexico, Oregon, Utah, Washington and Wyoming).

It was first published in Fl. Helv. vol.2 on page 57 in 1828.

== Species ==
As accepted by Kew:

- Eritrichium acicularum Y.S.Lian & J.Q.Wang
- Eritrichium aldanense Ovczinnikova
- Eritrichium alpinum Ovczinnikova
- Eritrichium arctisibiricum (V.V.Petrovsky) A.P.Khokhr.
- Eritrichium arenosum D.F.Murray
- Eritrichium aretioides (Cham.) DC.
- Eritrichium argenteum W.Wight
- Eritrichium axilliflorum Li Bing Zhang & Yi F.Duan
- Eritrichium baicalense Popov ex Ovczinnikova
- Eritrichium boreale D.F.Murray
- Eritrichium borealisinense Kitag.
- Eritrichium caespitosum Ovcz.
- Eritrichium canum (Benth.) Kitam.
- Eritrichium caucasicum (Albov) Grossh.
- Eritrichium chamissonis A.DC.
- Eritrichium confertiflorum W.T.Wang
- Eritrichium deltodentum Y.S.Lian & J.Q.Wang
- Eritrichium deqinense W.T.Wang
- Eritrichium dubium O.Fedtsch.
- Eritrichium echinocaryum (I.M.Johnst.) Y.S.Lian & J.Q.Wang
- Eritrichium fetisowii Regel
- Eritrichium fruticulosum Klotzsch
- Eritrichium gracillimum Rech.f.
- Eritrichium grandiflorum D.F.Murray
- Eritrichium hemisphaericum W.T.Wang
- Eritrichium howardii (A.Gray) Rydb.
- Eritrichium humillimum W.T.Wang
- Eritrichium huzhuense X.F.Lu & G.R.Zheng
- Eritrichium incanum (Turcz.) A.DC.
- Eritrichium jacuticum Popov
- Eritrichium jenisseense Turcz. ex A.DC.
- Eritrichium kamelinii Ovczinnikova
- Eritrichium kangdingense W.T.Wang
- Eritrichium karavaevii Ovcz.
- Eritrichium latifolium Kar. & Kir.
- Eritrichium laxum I.M.Johnst.
- Eritrichium lianyongshanii Li Bing Zhang & Yi F.Duan
- Eritrichium longifolium Decne.
- Eritrichium longipes Y.S.Lian & J.Q.Wang
- Eritrichium mandshuricum Popov
- Eritrichium medicarpum Y.S.Lian & J.Q.Wang
- Eritrichium mertonii Riedl
- Eritrichium minimum (Brand) H.Hara
- Eritrichium nanum (L.) Gaudin
- Eritrichium nipponicum Makino
- Eritrichium ochotense Jurtzev & A.P.Khokhr.
- Eritrichium oligocanthum Y.S.Lian & J.Q.Wang
- Eritrichium pamiricum B.Fedtsch. ex O.Fedtsch.
- Eritrichium pauciflorum DC.
- Eritrichium pectinatociliatum Y.S.Lian & J.Q.Wang
- Eritrichium pectinatum (Pall.) DC.
- Eritrichium pendulifructum Y.S.Lian & J.Q.Wang
- Eritrichium petiolare W.T.Wang
- Eritrichium pseudolatifolium Popov
- Eritrichium pseudostrictum Popov
- Eritrichium pulvinatum (V.V.Petrovsky) Ovczinnikova
- Eritrichium pulviniforme Popov
- Eritrichium putoranicum Ovczinnikova
- Eritrichium qofengense Y.S.Lian & J.Q.Wang
- Eritrichium relictum Kudab.
- Eritrichium sajanense (Malyschev) Sipliv.
- Eritrichium sericeum (Lehm.) A.DC.
- Eritrichium serxuense W.T.Wang
- Eritrichium sichotense Popov
- Eritrichium sinomicrocarpum W.T.Wang
- Eritrichium spathulatum (Benth.) C.B.Clarke
- Eritrichium splendens Kearney ex W.Wight
- Eritrichium subjacquemontii Popov
- Eritrichium tangkulaense W.T.Wang
- Eritrichium thomsonii (C.B.Clarke) I.M.Johnst.
- Eritrichium thymifolium (A.DC.) Y.S.Lian & J.Q.Wang
- Eritrichium tianschanicum Iljin ex Ovczinnikova
- Eritrichium tschuktschorum Jurtzev & V.V.Petrovsky
- Eritrichium turkestanicum Franch.
- Eritrichium tuvinense Popov
- Eritrichium uralense Serg.
- Eritrichium villosum (Ledeb.) Bunge
- Eritrichium wangwencaii Li Bing Zhang & Yi F.Duan
