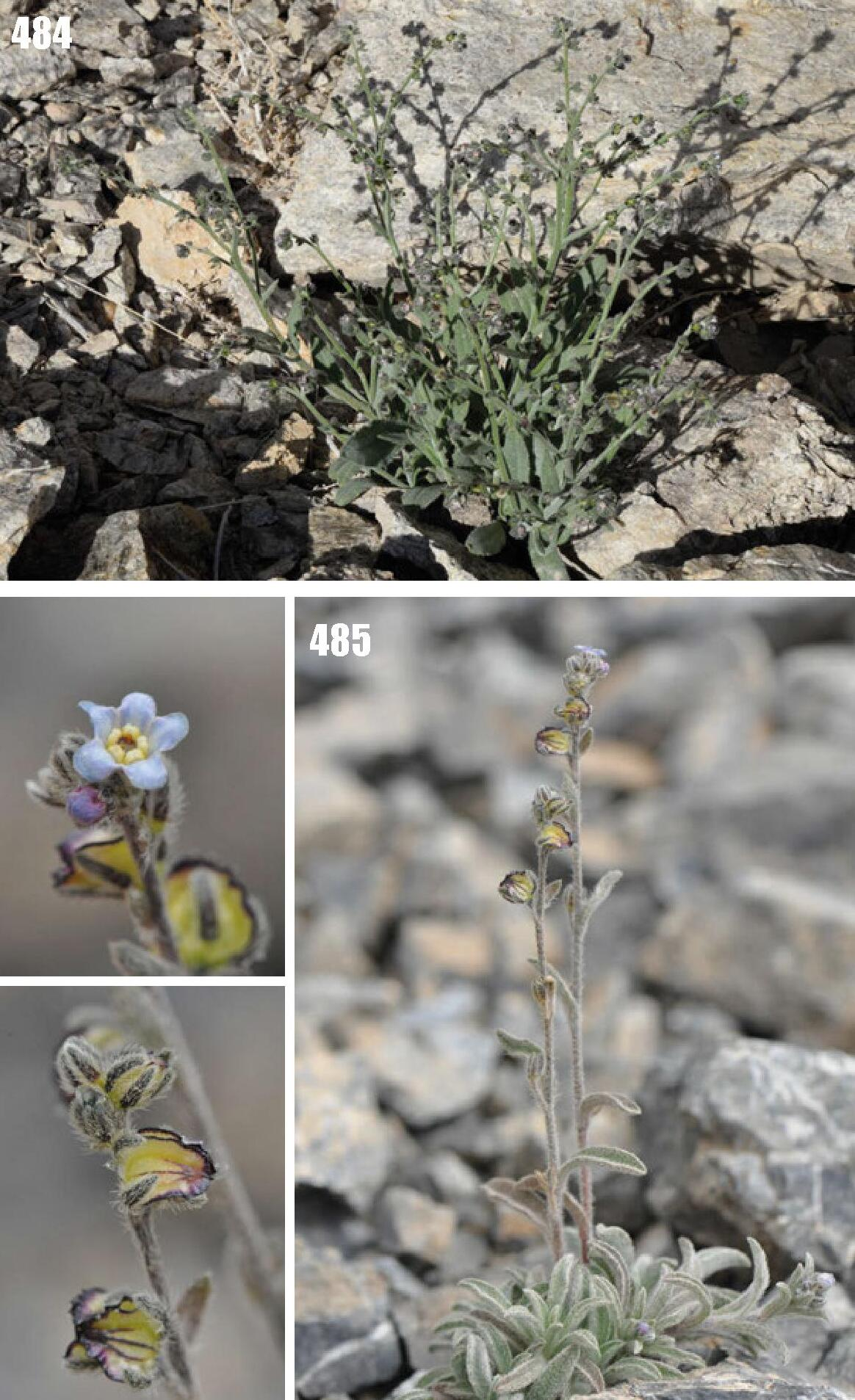
- L. sarawschanica and L. transalaica

Scientific classification
- Kingdom: Plantae
- Clade: Tracheophytes
- Clade: Angiosperms
- Clade: Eudicots
- Clade: Asterids
- Order: Boraginales
- Family: Boraginaceae
- Genus: Lepechiniella; Popov

= Lepechiniella =

Genus of plants

Lepechiniella is a genus of flowering plants belonging to the family Boraginaceae.

Its native range is Iran and Western Himalaya, to Xinjiang (in China). It is also found in the countries of Afghanistan, Kazakhstan, Kyrgyzstan, Pakistan, Tajikistan, Turkmenistan and Uzbekistan.

The genus name of Lepechiniella is in honour of Ivan Lepyokhin (1740–1802), a Russian naturalist, zoologist, botanist and explorer. It was first described and published in V.L.Komarov (ed.), Fl. URSS Vol.19 on page 713 in 1953.

== Known species ==
According to Kew:

- Lepechiniella alatavica (Popov ex Golosk.) Ovczinnikova
- Lepechiniella austrodshungarica Golosk.
- Lepechiniella fursei Riedl
- Lepechiniella korshinskyi Popov
- Lepechiniella lasiocarpa W.T.Wang
- Lepechiniella michaelis Golosk.
- Lepechiniella microcarpa (Boiss.) Riedl
- Lepechiniella minuta (Lipsky) Popov
- Lepechiniella omphaloides (Schrenk) Popov
- Lepechiniella persica (Boiss.) Riedl
- Lepechiniella sarawschanica (Lipsky) Popov
- Lepechiniella saurica (Bajtenov & Kudab.) Ovczinnikova
- Lepechiniella ulacholica (Popov) Ovczinnikova
