= Trachelanthus (plant) =

Scientific classification
- Kingdom: Plantae
- Clade: Embryophytes
- Clade: Tracheophytes
- Clade: Spermatophytes
- Clade: Angiosperms
- Clade: Eudicots
- Clade: Asterids
- Order: Boraginales
- Family: Boraginaceae
- Subfamily: Boraginoideae
- Genus: Trachelanthus; Kunze (1850)

Genus of flowering plants

Trachelanthus is a genus of flowering plants belonging to the family Boraginaceae.

Its native range is Western and Central Asia.

Species:

- Trachelanthus cerinthoides (Boiss.) Kunze
- Trachelanthus foliosus (Paine) Tristram
- Trachelanthus hissaricus Lipsky
- Trachelanthus korolkowii Lipsky
