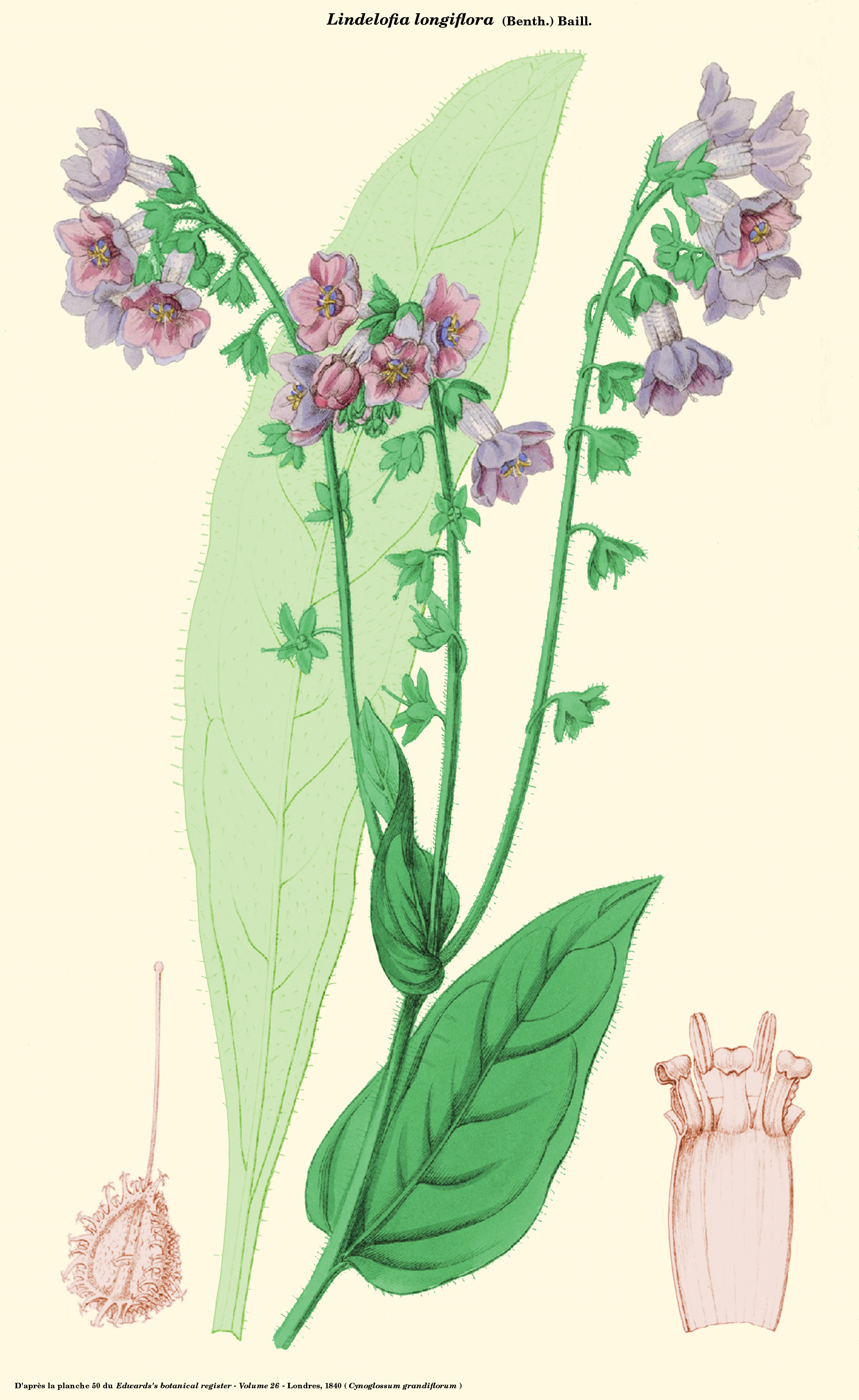
- Lindelofia longiflora

Scientific classification
- Kingdom: Plantae
- Clade: Tracheophytes
- Clade: Angiosperms
- Clade: Eudicots
- Clade: Asterids
- Order: Boraginales
- Family: Boraginaceae
- Genus: Lindelofia; Lehm. (1850)

Synonyms
- Anchusopsis Bisch. (1852)

= Lindelofia =

Genus of plants

Lindelofia is a genus of flowering plants belonging to the family Boraginaceae.

Its native range is Afghanistan to Mongolia and Himalaya.

Species:

- Lindelofia anchusoides (Lindl.) Lehm.
- Lindelofia campanulata Riedl
- Lindelofia capusii (Franch.) Popov
- Lindelofia longiflora (DC.) Baill.
- Lindelofia longipedicellata Riedl
- Lindelofia micrantha Rech.f. & Riedl
- Lindelofia olgae (Regel & Smirn.) Brand
- Lindelofia platycalyx Riedl
- Lindelofia stylosa (Kar. & Kir.) Brand
- Lindelofia tschimganica (Lipsky) Popov
