= Ivan Lepyokhin =

Coordinates: 60°26′N 59°14′E

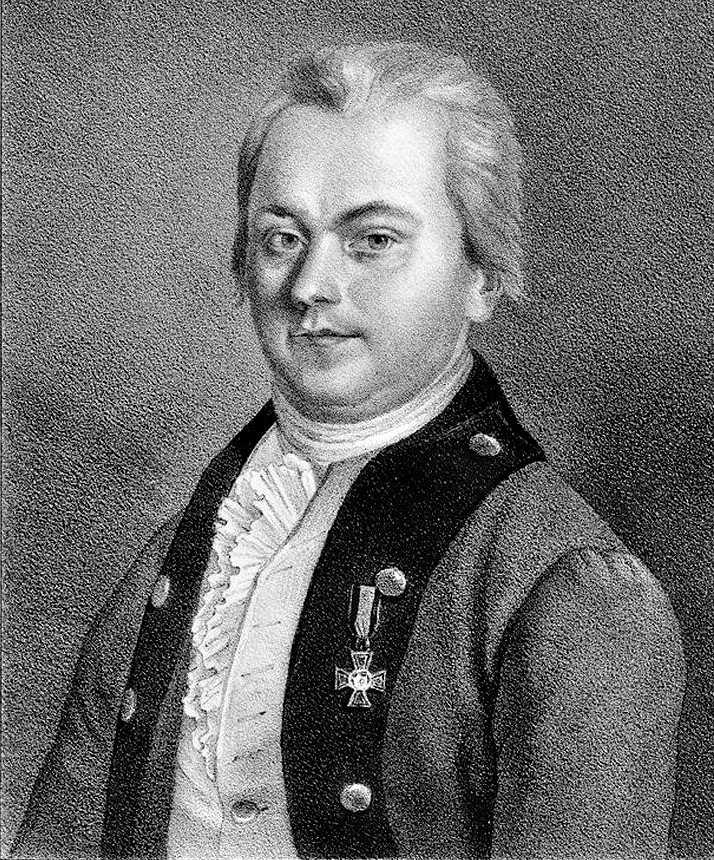
Ivan Lepyokhin

Ivan Ivanovich Lepyokhin (Иван Иванович Лепёхин; 21 September [O.S. 10 September] 1740, in Saint Petersburg – 18 April [O.S. 6 April] 1802, in Saint Petersburg) was a Russian naturalist, zoologist, botanist and explorer.

He began his studies in the Academy of Sciences of Saint-Petersburg and gained his doctorate at faculty of medicine of the University of Strasbourg.

In 1768 he explored the Volga region and the Caspian Sea. In 1769 he went to the Ural Mountains which he explored for five years. In 1774 and 1775 he explored Siberia.

Ivan Lepekhin was the Secretary of the Russian Academy since 1783. His extensive journals, revised and completed by Nikolay Ozeretskovsky, were published in 4 hefty volumes between 1771 and 1805.

Lepekhin was in charge of the Saint Petersburg Botanical Garden from 1774 until his death.

In 1804, his name was honoured in the name Lepechinia from South America, (in the family Lamiaceae) by Carl Ludwig von Willdenow, and then in 1953, Mikhail Grigorevich Popov published a genus of flowering plants from Central Asia, belonging to the family Boraginaceae as Lepechiniella also in his honour.
