= Tyleropappus =

Scientific classification
- Kingdom: Plantae
- Clade: Tracheophytes
- Clade: Angiosperms
- Clade: Eudicots
- Clade: Asterids
- Order: Asterales
- Family: Asteraceae
- Genus: Tyleropappus; Greenm.
- Species: T. dichotomus

Binomial name
- Tyleropappus dichotomus Greenm. ex Gleason

Species of flowering plant

Tyleropappus is a genus of flowering plants belonging to the family Asteraceae. It just contains one species, Tyleropappus dichotomus Greenm. ex Gleason

Its native range is Venezuela. It is found in high altitude mountain regions.

== Description ==
They are dichotomously (forking into two equal branches) branched sub-shrubs, 0.4–1 m (1 ft 4 in – 3 ft 3 in) tall with leaves clustered towards stem apex. The stems are hirtellous (minutely hirsute) and densely covered with leaf scars. The leaves are simple, spirally inserted, sessile or short petiolate (have small leaf stalks). The leaf blades are linear to lanceolate, stiff, 1 veined to weakly pinnately veined. The upper surface of the leaf is glabrous, with the lower surface punctate glandular. It has entire margins which are revolute. The flowers are terminal (at the ends of branches).

== Taxonomy ==
The genus name of Tyleropappus is in honour of Sidney Frederick Tyler (1907–1993), American banker and cattle rancher. He was also a supporter of charitable organizations. Umberto Quattrocchi has a different name reason; Greek tyleros meaning callous and pappos meaning fluff, downy appendage. The Latin specific epithet of dichotomus means split in two; from dichotomous. Both the genus and the sole species were first described and published in Bull. Torrey Bot. Club Vol.58 on page 486 in 1931.

It was once thought to be a synonym of Calea L..
