= Podocalea =

Scientific classification
- Kingdom: Plantae
- Clade: Tracheophytes
- Clade: Angiosperms
- Clade: Eudicots
- Clade: Asterids
- Order: Asterales
- Family: Asteraceae
- Subfamily: Asteroideae
- Tribe: Neurolaeneae
- Subtribe: Neurolaeninae
- Genus: Podocalea; Pruski

Species
- 18; see text

Genus of flowering plants

Podocalea is a genus of flowering plants in the family Asteraceae. It includes 18 species native to South America, ranging from northern Brazil to Bolivia and Northeastern Argentina. They are perennial herbs or cymose-capitulate subshrubs, with proximally disposed opposite leaves and typically with few stems. Species are mostly native to the basin of the Paraná River, with some native to the Tocantins River basin of Amazonia.

The species were formerly placed in genus Calea section Monanthocalea. In 2023 John F. Pruski placed them in the new genus Podocalea.

== Species ==
18 species are accepted.

- Podocalea abbreviata (Pruski & Urbatsch) Pruski
- Podocalea angustifolia (Gardner) Pruski
- Podocalea asclepiifolia (Hassl.) Pruski
- Podocalea bakeriana (Chodat) Pruski
- Podocalea cabrerae (Pruski) Pruski
- Podocalea camporum (Krasch.) Pruski
- Podocalea catalaonensis (Krasch.) Pruski
- Podocalea cuneifolia (DC.) Pruski
- Podocalea formosa (Chodat) Pruski
- Podocalea multiplinervia (Less.) Pruski
- Podocalea oligocephala (DC.) Pruski
- Podocalea paraguayensis (Kuntze) Pruski
- Podocalea pedunculosa (DC.) Pruski
- Podocalea pohliana (Sch.Bip. ex Baker) Pruski
- Podocalea rupicola (Chodat) Pruski
- Podocalea tomentosa (Gardner) Pruski
- Podocalea uniflora (Less.) Pruski
- Podocalea verticillata (Klatt) Pruski
