= Brasilia (disambiguation) =

Brasília is the capital of Brazil.

Brasilia may also refer to:

- 293 Brasilia, Main belt asteroid
- Embraer EMB 120 Brasilia, twin-turboprop commuter airliner, produced by Embraer of Brazil
- Volkswagen Brasília, compact car made in Brazil
- Brasília (footballer) (born 1977), full name Cristiano Pereira de Souza, Brazilian footballer
- Plano Piloto (officially named Brasília until 1997), Administrative region of the Federal District
- Wésley Brasilia (born 1981), Brazilian footballer
- Autódromo Internacional Nelson Piquet (Brasília), racing circuit formerly called Autódromo de Brasília, and still commonly referred to by its previous name
- Brasilia G.M.Barroso, a genus of flowering plants, synonym of Lemmatium DC.
