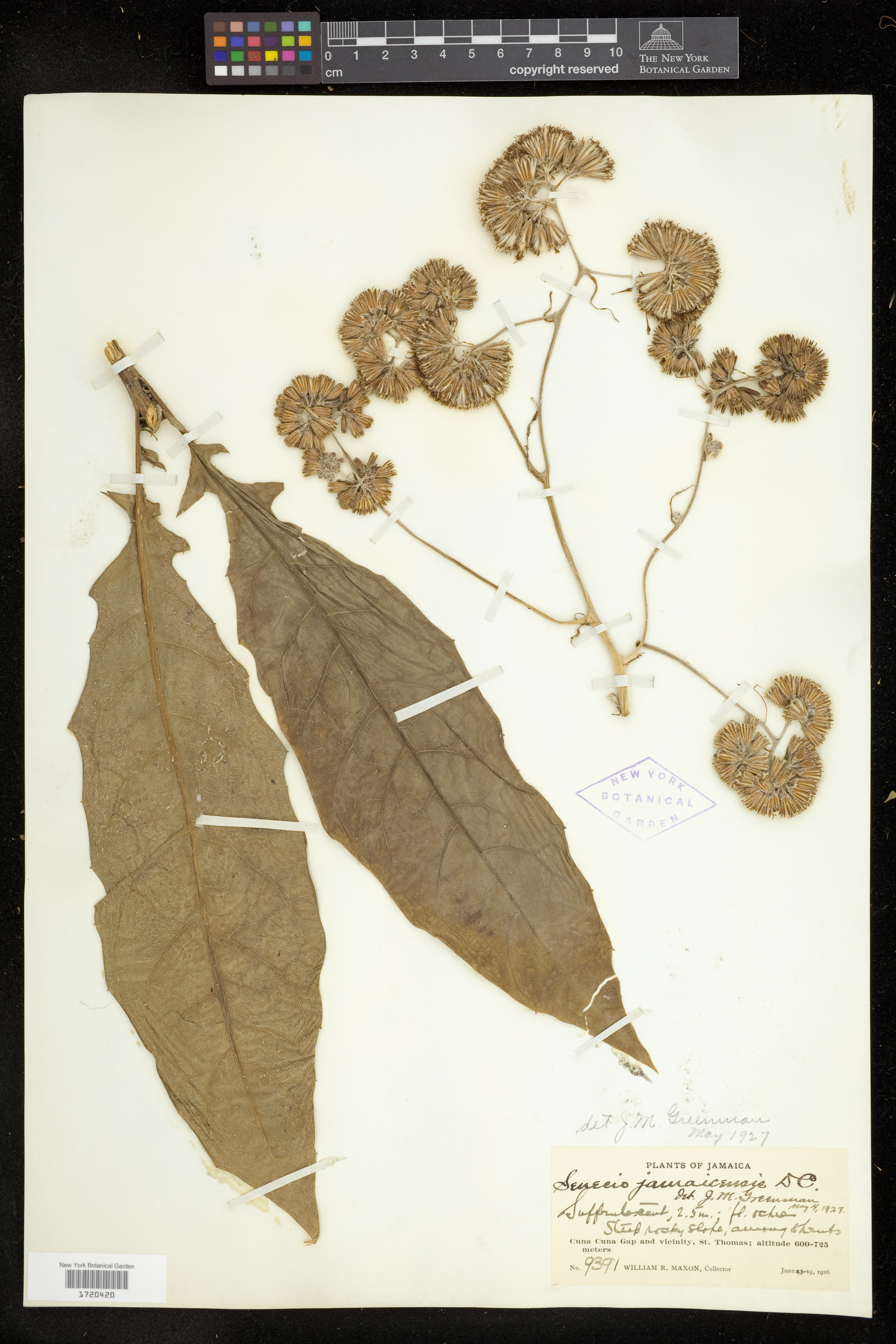

Scientific classification
- Kingdom: Plantae
- Clade: Embryophytes
- Clade: Tracheophytes
- Clade: Angiosperms
- Clade: Eudicots
- Clade: Asterids
- Order: Asterales
- Family: Asteraceae
- Subfamily: Asteroideae
- Tribe: Senecioneae
- Genus: Jacmaia; B.Nord.
- Species: J. incana

Binomial name
- Jacmaia incana (Sw.) B.Nord.

Synonyms
- Cineraria incana Sw.

= Jacmaia =

Genus of flowering plants in the daisy family

Jacmaia is a genus of flowering plants in the daisy family. This generic name is an anagram derived from Jamaica.

== Systematics ==
The genus Jacmaia comprises only one recognized species, Jacmaia incana, native to Jamaica.

The following species, formerly included in Jacmaia, are now subsumed in Jessea and Odontocline:

- Jacmaia cooperi (Greenm.) C.Jeffrey – Jessea cooperi (Greenm.) H.Rob. & Cuatrec.
- Jacmaia laciniata (Sw.) C.Jeffrey – Odontocline laciniata (Sw.) B.Nord.
- Jacmaia megaphylla (Greenm.) C.Jeffrey – Jessea megaphylla (Greenm.) H.Rob. & Cuatrec.
- Jacmaia multivenia (Benth.) C.Jeffrey – Jessea multivenia (Benth. ex Benth.) H.Rob. & Cuatrec.
