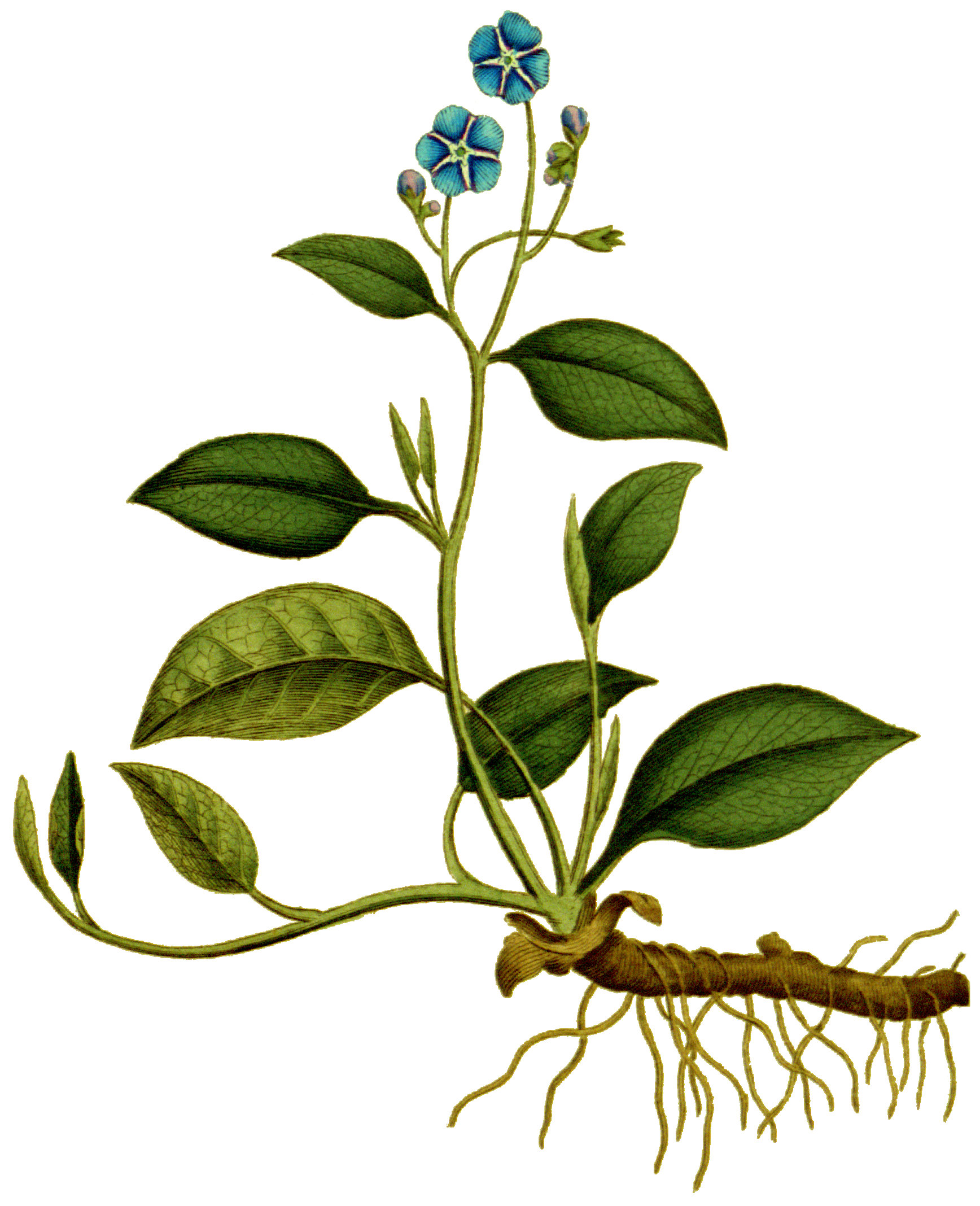
- Omphalodes verna

Scientific classification
- Kingdom: Plantae
- Clade: Embryophytes
- Clade: Tracheophytes
- Clade: Spermatophytes
- Clade: Angiosperms
- Clade: Eudicots
- Clade: Asterids
- Order: Boraginales
- Family: Boraginaceae
- Subfamily: Boraginoideae
- Genus: Omphalodes; Mill. (1754)

Type species
- Omphalodes verna Moench

Species
- 11; see text

Synonyms
- Omphalium Wallr. (1822), nom. superfl.; Picotia Roem. & Schult. (1819), nom. superfl.; Umbilicaria Heist. ex Fabr. (1759), nom. superfl.

= Omphalodes =

Genus of flowering plants in the borage family

Omphalodes (navelwort) is a genus of flowering plants in the family Boraginaceae. It includes eleven species native to Europe and western Asia. In spring they produce blue or white flowers similar to forget-me-nots.

Both the Greek Omphalodes (navel-like) and the English "navelwort" refer to the shape of the seeds.

O. verna and cultivars of O. cappadocica are grown in gardens for their blue flowers which in spring appear above the leaves in loose sprays. They are woodland plants, preferring some shade.

== Species ==
11 species are accepted.

- Omphalodes cappadocica (Willd.) DC.
- Omphalodes davisiana Kit Tan & Sorger
- Omphalodes heterophylla Rech.f. & Riedl
- Omphalodes kusnezowii Kolak.
- Omphalodes luciliae Boiss.
- Omphalodes nedimeae Aykurt & Sümbül
- Omphalodes nitida (Willd.) Hoffmanns. & Link
- Omphalodes ripleyana P.H.Davis
- Omphalodes runemarkii Strid & Kit Tan
- Omphalodes rupestris Rupr. ex Boiss.
- Omphalodes verna Moench

== Systematics ==
The genus Omphalodes traditionally contained many species that have been split-off in 2014 and 2016. The Japanese "Omphalodes" and "Omphalodes scorpioides" turned out not to be closely related to Omphalodes, and were separated as distinct genera, Nihon and Memoremea respectively. Serrano et al. separated the Iberian annual species as Iberodes. This left the remainder of species from Western Eurasia as sister to New World species, including the Chatham Islands (off the coast of New Zealand) endemic species Myosotidium hortensia. The clade of the New World species also included the Juan Fernández Islands (off the coast of Chile) endemic Selkirkia berteroi and three species formerly placed in Cynoglossum, which were then transferred to a more broadly circumscribed genus Selkirkia. The majority of the North American "Omphalodes" species were then split-off as Mimophytum.

Omphalodes in its strict sense comprises Western Eurasian perennial species with a creeping rhizome.

== Gallery ==
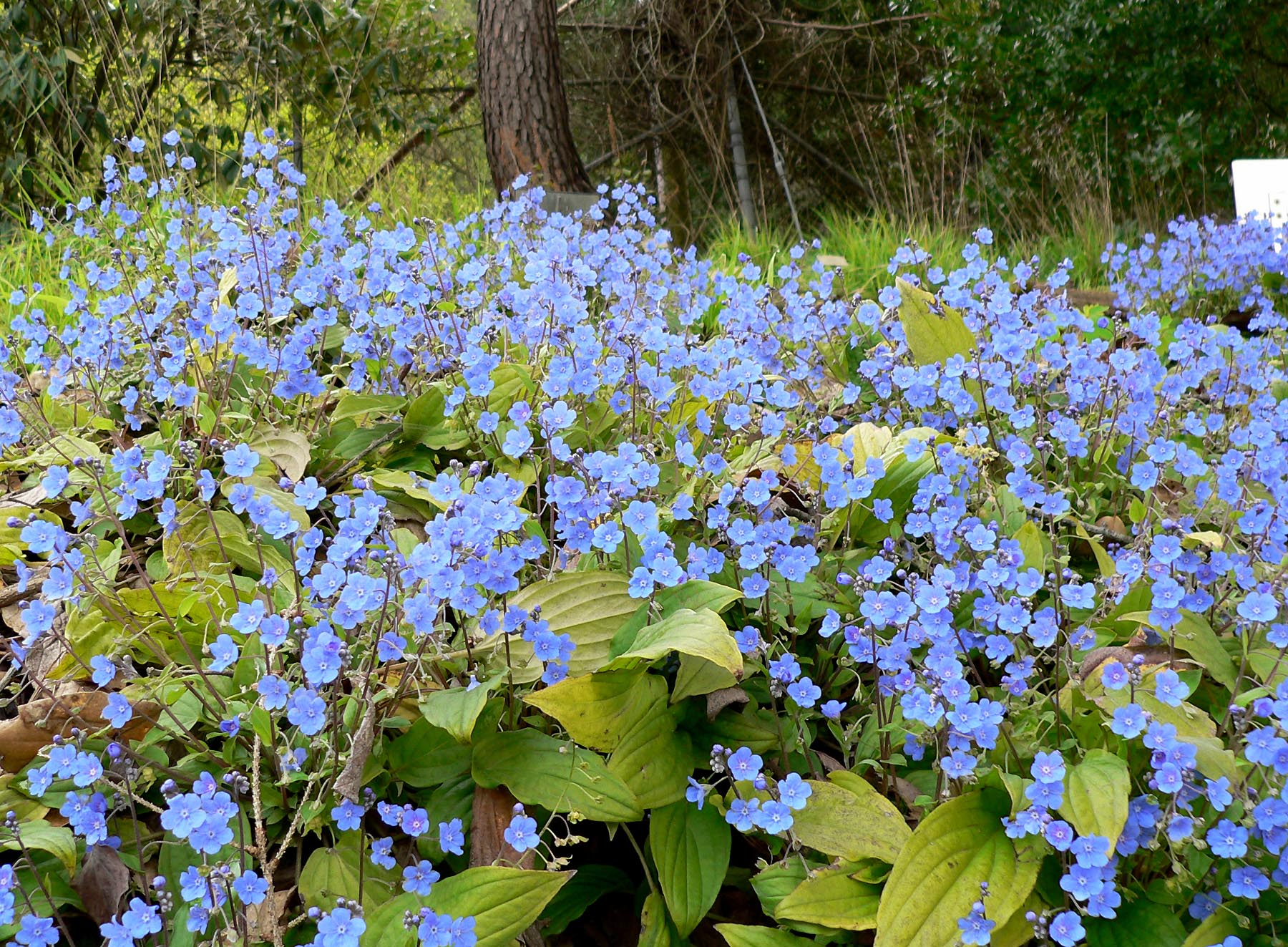
Omphalodes cappadocica

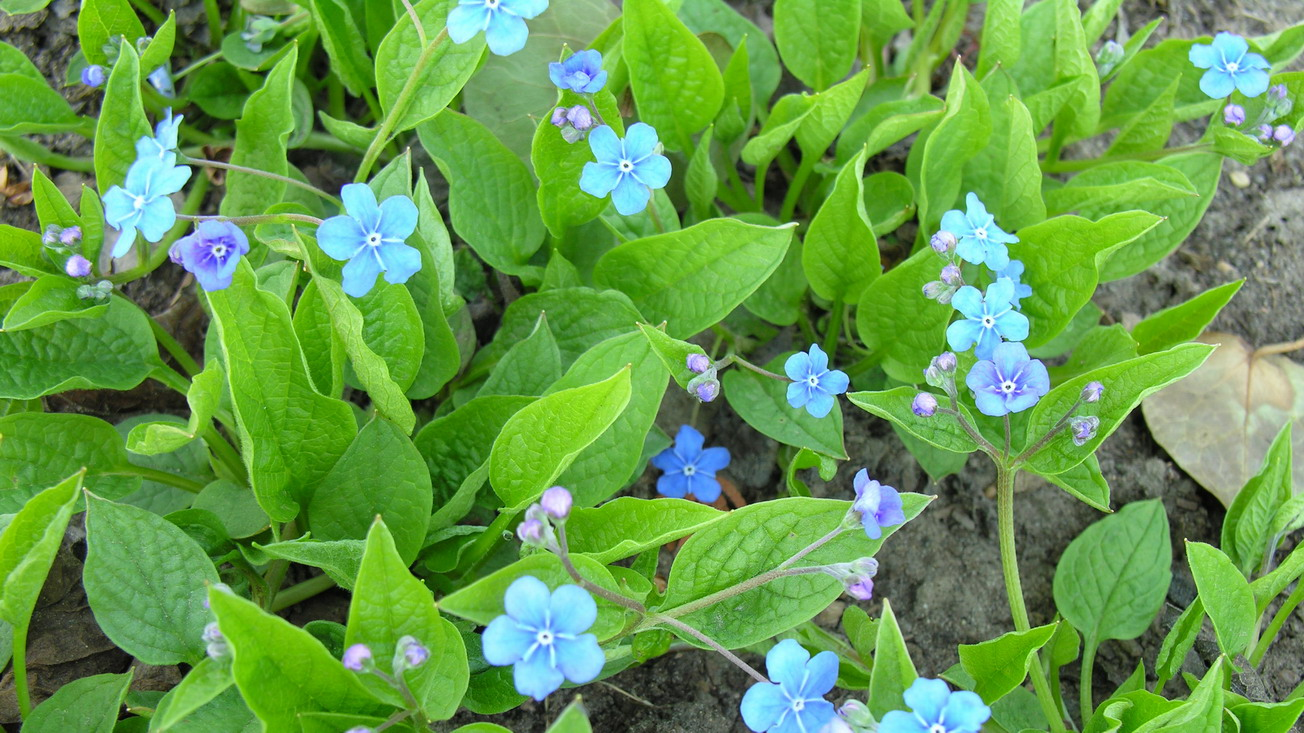
Omphalodes verna
