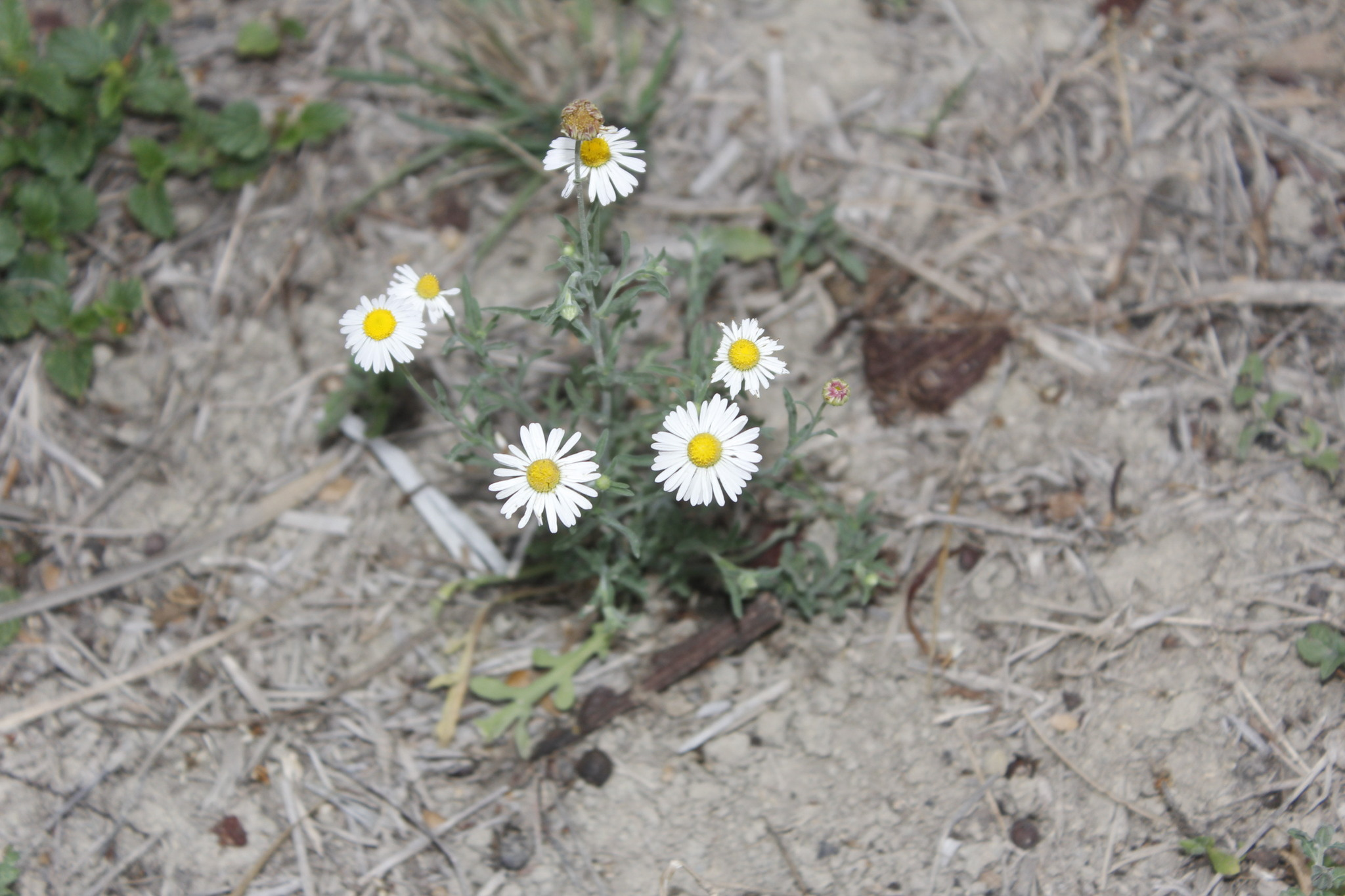
- In Nuevo León, Mexico

Scientific classification
- Kingdom: Plantae
- Clade: Tracheophytes
- Clade: Angiosperms
- Clade: Eudicots
- Clade: Asterids
- Order: Asterales
- Family: Asteraceae
- Genus: Erigeron
- Species: E. versicolor

Binomial name
- Erigeron versicolor (Greenm.) G.L.Nesom

Synonyms
- Synonymy: Achaetogeron chihuahuensis Larsen; Achaetogeron versicolor Greenm.; Erigeron geiseri var. calcicola Shinners; Erigeron gilensis Wooton & Standl.; Erigeron mimegletes Shinners

= Erigeron versicolor =

Species of flowering plant

Erigeron versicolor is a rare North American species of flowering plant in the family Asteraceae known by the common names bald-fruit fleabane and changing fleabane. It is native to the southwestern United States (Arizona, New Mexico, Texas) and northern and central Mexico as far south as Michoacán.

Erigeron versicolor grows in scattered locations usually in moist places such as the edges of ponds, marshes, and creeks. It is an annual or perennial herb up to 80 centimeters (32 inches) tall. One plant can produce as few as one flower head or as many as 100. Each head contains 60–110 white ray florets surrounding numerous yellow disc florets.
