= O. commutata =

O. commutata may refer to:

- Omphalodes commutata, a flowering plant
- Orbea commutata, a flowering plant
- Oxalis commutata, a herbaceous plant
