= Laceanthos =

Scientific classification
- Kingdom: Plantae
- Clade: Embryophytes
- Clade: Tracheophytes
- Clade: Spermatophytes
- Clade: Angiosperms
- Clade: Eudicots
- Clade: Asterids
- Order: Asterales
- Family: Asteraceae
- Subfamily: Asteroideae
- Tribe: Neurolaeneae
- Subtribe: Neurolaeninae
- Genus: Laceanthos; Pruski

Species
- 8; see text

Genus of flowering plants

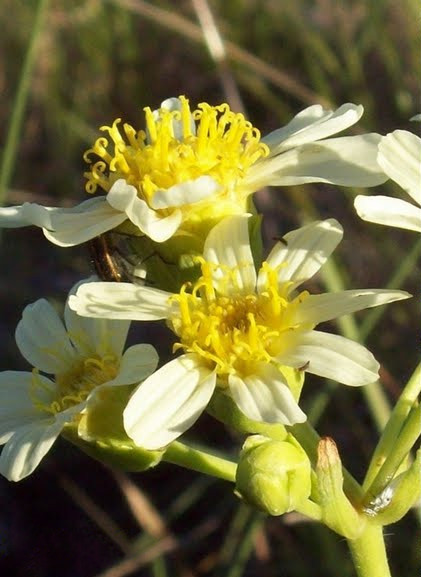
Laceanthos cymosus

Laceanthos is a genus of flowering plants in the family Asteraceae. It includes eight species native to South America, ranging from northern Brazil to Bolivia and northeastern Argentina.

The species were formerly placed in genus Calea section Haplocalea. In 2023 John F. Pruski placed placed them in the new genus Laceanthos.

== Species ==
Eight species are accepted.

- Laceanthos acaulis (Baker) Pruski
- Laceanthos chapadensis (Malme) Pruski
- Laceanthos crenatus (Chodat) Pruski
- Laceanthos cymosus (Less.) Pruski
- Laceanthos hasslerianus (Chodat) Pruski
- Laceanthos mediterraneus (Vell.) Pruski
- Laceanthos reticulatus (Gardner) Pruski
- Laceanthos rhombifolius (S.F.Blake) Pruski
