= Neurolenin B =

Identifiers
CAS Number	67506-30-3
3D model (JSmol)	Interactive image
ChEBI	CHEBI:66621
ChEMBL	ChEMBL1173219
ChemSpider	25059553
PubChem CID	49799795
CompTox Dashboard (EPA)	DTXSID701336063
- InChI: InChI=1S/C22H30O8/c1-11(2)9-17(25)30-19-18-13(4)21(26)29-15(18)10-12(3)7-8-16(24)22(6,27)20(19)28-14(5)23/h7-8,11-12,15,18-20,27H,4,9-10H2,1-3,5-6H3/b8-7-/t12-,15+,18-,19-,20+,22+/m0/s1 Key: UVRIFAYGSSDVER-MBZNIOTRSA-N
- SMILES: C[C@@H]/1C[C@@H]2[C@@H]([C@@H]([C@H]([C@](C(=O)/C=C1)(C)O)OC(=O)C)OC(=O)CC(C)C)C(=C)C(=O)O2

Properties
Chemical formula	C_{22}H_{30}O_{8}
Molar mass	422.474 g·mol^{−1}
- Except where otherwise noted, data are given for materials in their standard state (at 25 °C [77 °F], 100 kPa). Infobox references

Neurolenin B is an antimalarial chemical isolated from Neurolaena lobata and Austroeupatorium inulifolium.
