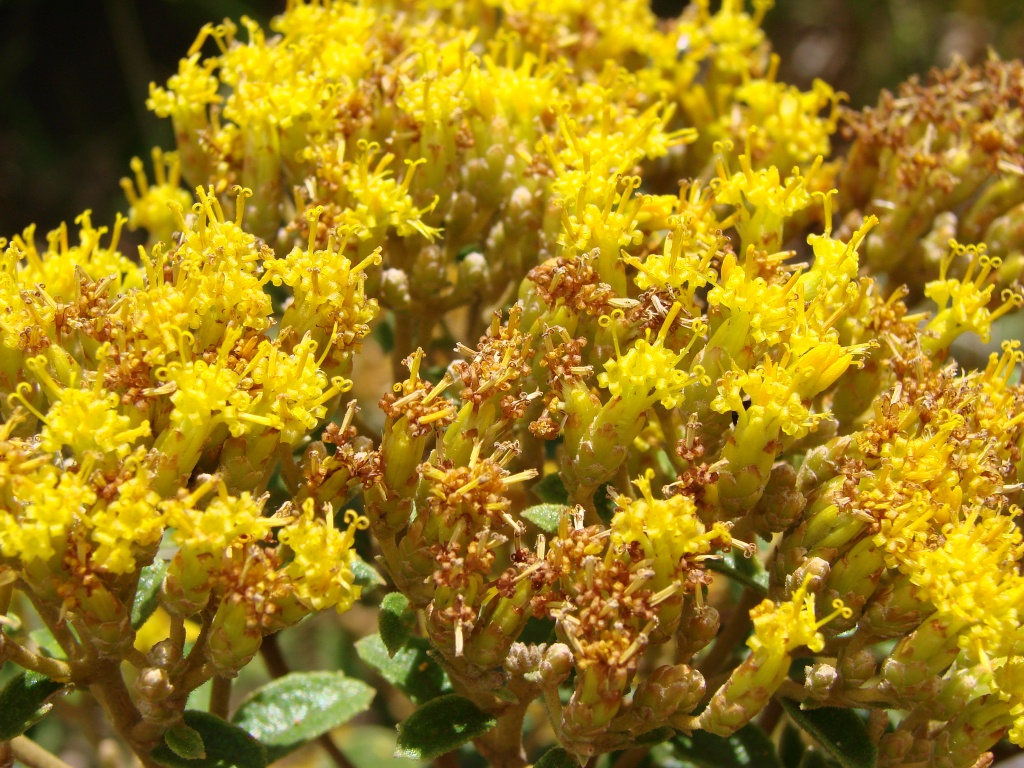
- Calea rotundifolia

Scientific classification
- Kingdom: Plantae
- Clade: Tracheophytes
- Clade: Angiosperms
- Clade: Eudicots
- Clade: Asterids
- Order: Asterales
- Family: Asteraceae
- Subfamily: Asteroideae
- Tribe: Neurolaeneae
- Genus: Calea; L.

Type species
- Calea jamaicensis (L.) L.

Synonyms
- Amphicalea (DC.) Gardner; Aschenbornia S.Schauer; Caleacte R.Br. ex Steud.; Geissopappus Benth.; Leontophthalmum Willd.; Meyeria DC.; Mocinna Lag.; Schomburghia DC.; Stenophyllum Sch.Bip. ex Benth. & Hook.f.; Trinchinettia Endl.; Tyleropappus Greenm.

= Calea (plant) =

Genus of flowering plants

Calea is a genus of flowering plants in the aster family, Asteraceae. They are distributed in tropical and subtropical regions in Mexico, Central America, and South America.

Extracts of Calea species have produced antifungal, anti-inflammatory, cytotoxic, larvicidal, antiplasmodial, and antihypertensive effects in experiments. Some species are used in traditional medicine and ritual. Calea clematidea is used to treat influenza. Calea ternifolia is used in Mexico to treat dysentery and fever, and native peoples use it to influence their dreams.

== Species ==
161 species are accepted.

- Calea abbreviata Pruski & Urbatsch
- Calea abelioides S.F.Blake
- Calea acaulis Baker
- Calea aldamoides G.H.L. da Silva, Bringel & A.M.Teles
- Calea angosturana Hieron.
- Calea angusta S.F.Blake
- Calea anomala Hassl.
- Calea arachnoidea G.A.R.Silva & J.N.Nakaj.
- Calea asclepiifolia Hassl.
- Calea bahiensis (Mattf.) H.Rob.
- Calea bakeriana Chodat
- Calea berteroana DC.
- Calea bishopii H.Rob.
- Calea breviflora
- Calea brittoniana Pruski
- Calea bucaramangensisPruski & Urbatsch
- Calea cabrerae Pruski
- Calea caleoides (DC.) H.Rob.
- Calea camani Maguire & K.D.Phelps
- Calea candolleana Baker
- Calea chapadensis Malme
- Calea clausseniana Baker
- Calea chodatii Hassl.
- Calea clematidea Baker
- Calea colombiana Gand.
- Calea coriacea DC.
- Calea coridifolia Pruski
- Calea coronopifolia Sch.Bip. ex Krasch.
- Calea × crassa V.R.Bueno & G.Heiden
- Calea crassifolia Standl. & Steyerm.
- Calea crenata Chodat
- Calea crocinervosa Wussow, Urbatsch & G.A.Sullivan
- Calea cuneifolia DC.
- Calea cymosa Less.
- Calea dalyi Pruski & Urbatsch
- Calea densiflora Pruski & Urbatsch
- Calea diamantinensis G.A.R.Silva & J.N.Nakaj.
- Calea diffusa Pruski
- Calea divaricata Benth.
- Calea divergens Sch.Bip. ex Baker
- Calea elongata Baker
- Calea esposi Maguire & K.D.Phelps
- Calea ferruginea Baker
- Calea fluviatilis S.F.Blake
- Calea formosa Chodat
- Calea fruticosa (Gardner) Urbatsch, Zlotsky & Pruski
- Calea funkiana V.R.Bueno & G.Heiden
- Calea gardneriana Baker
- Calea gargantae Cuatrec.
- Calea gentianoides DC.
- Calea graminifolia Sch.Bip. ex Krasch.
- Calea grandiflora V.R.Bueno & G.Heiden
- Calea granitica Pruski
- Calea grazielae J.U.Santos
- Calea harleyi H.Rob.
- Calea harlingii H.Rob.
- Calea hassleriana Chodat
- Calea hatschbachii Pruski & D.J.N.Hind
- Calea heteropappa Pruski & Urbatsch
- Calea huanchacana Pruski
- Calea huigrensis S.F.Blake
- Calea hymenolepis Baker
- Calea hypericifolia Baker
- Calea ilienii Malme
- Calea intermedia Pruski & Urbatsch
- Calea irwinii G.M.Barroso
- Calea jamaicensis (L.) L.
- Calea jelskii Hieron.
- Calea kingii H.Rob.
- Calea kirkbridei H.Rob.
- Calea kristiniae Pruski
- Calea kunhardtii Maguire
- Calea lantanoides Gardner
- Calea lemmatioides Sch.Bip. ex Baker
- Calea linearifolia Maguire & Wurdack
- Calea longifolia Baker
- Calea longipedicellata B.L.Rob. & Greenm.
- Calea lucida Maguire & Wurdack
- Calea lucidivenia Gleason & S.F.Blake
- Calea lutea Pruski & Urbatsch
- Calea marginata S.F.Blake
- Calea martiana Baker
- Calea mediterranea (Vell.) Pruski
- Calea melissifolia Baker
- Calea microphylla Baker
- Calea monocephala Dusén
- Calea montana Klatt
- Calea morii H.Rob.
- Calea multiplinervia Less.
- Calea myrtifolia (DC.) Baker
- Calea nana Maguire
- Calea neblinensis (Maguire & Wurdack) Pruski
- Calea nelsonii B.L.Rob. & Greenm.
- Calea nematophylla Pruski
- Calea nervosa G.M.Barroso
- Calea nitida Less.
- Calea oaxacana (B.L.Turner) B.L.Turner
- Calea oliveri B.L.Rob. & Greenm.
- Calea orbiculata Maguire & Aristeg.
- Calea ottohuberi Pruski
- Calea oxylepis Baker
- Calea papposa Malme
- Calea paraguayensis (Kuntze) Deble
- Calea × parviantha V.R.Bueno & G.Heiden
- Calea parvifolia Baker
- Calea perijaensis Cuatrec.
- Calea perimbricata Cuatrec.
- Calea peruviana Benth. ex S.F.Blake
- Calea phelpsiae Lasser & Maguire
- Calea phyllolepis Baker
- Calea pilosa Baker
- Calea pinheiroi H.Rob.
- Calea pinnatifida (R.Br. ex Steud.) DC.
- Calea pohliana Sch.Bip. ex Baker
- Calea politii Maguire
- Calea polycephala (Baker) H.Rob.
- Calea punctata Maguire & Wurdack
- Calea purpurea G.M.Barroso
- Calea quadrifolia Pruski & Urbatsch
- Calea ramosissima Baker
- Calea repanda V.R.Bueno, Gostel & G.Heiden
- Calea reticulata Gardner
- Calea rhombifolia S.F.Blake
- Calea robinsoniana Pruski
- Calea rojasiana Chodat
- Calea rotundifolia (Less.) Baker
- Calea rupicola Chodat
- Calea saxatilis Cuatrec.
- Calea semirii Pruski & D.J.N.Hind
- Calea senecioides Baker
- Calea septuplinervia Hieron.
- Calea serrata Less.
- Calea sessiliflora Less.
- Calea sessilifolia V.R.Bueno & G.Heiden
- Calea sickii (G.M.Barroso) Urbatsch, Zlotsky & Pruski
- Calea sipapoana Maguire
- Calea solidaginea Kunth
- Calea stenophylla Baker
- Calea subcordata S.F.Blake
- Calea subintegerrima (Malme) V.R.Bueno & G.Heiden
- Calea sublantanoides V.M.Badillo
- Calea szyszylowiczii Hieron.
- Calea ternifolia Kunth
- Calea teucriifolia Baker
- Calea tocantina Pruski
- Calea tolimana Hieron.
- Calea triantha (Vell.) Pruski
- Calea tricephala Maguire
- Calea tridactylita Sch.Bip. ex Krasch.
- Calea trujilloi V.M.Badillo
- Calea ulei Hieron.
- Calea umbellulata Hochr.
- Calea uniflora Less.
- Calea urticifolia (Mill.) DC.
- Calea venosa Pruski
- Calea verticillata (Klatt) Pruski
- Calea villosa Sch.Bip. ex Baker
- Calea wedelioides S.F.Blake
- Calea yariguiensis Rodr.-Cabeza & S.Díaz
- Calea yuruparina Cuatrec.

=== Formerly placed here ===
In 2023 John F. Pruski reclassified many Calea species into the new genera Laceanthos (formerly Calea sect. Haplocalea), Podocalea (formerly Calea sect. Monanthocalea), and Tepuipappus, and into the revived genera Lemmatium, Meyeria, and Tonalanthus. As of June 2025, Plants of the World Online still considers Meyeria to be a synonym of Calea.

- Tonalanthus megacephalus (B.L.Rob. & Greenm.) Pruski (as Calea megacephala B.L.Rob. & Greenm.)

Names brought to synonymy

- Calea elegans DC., a synonym for Perymenium acuminatum, a plant found in Mexico

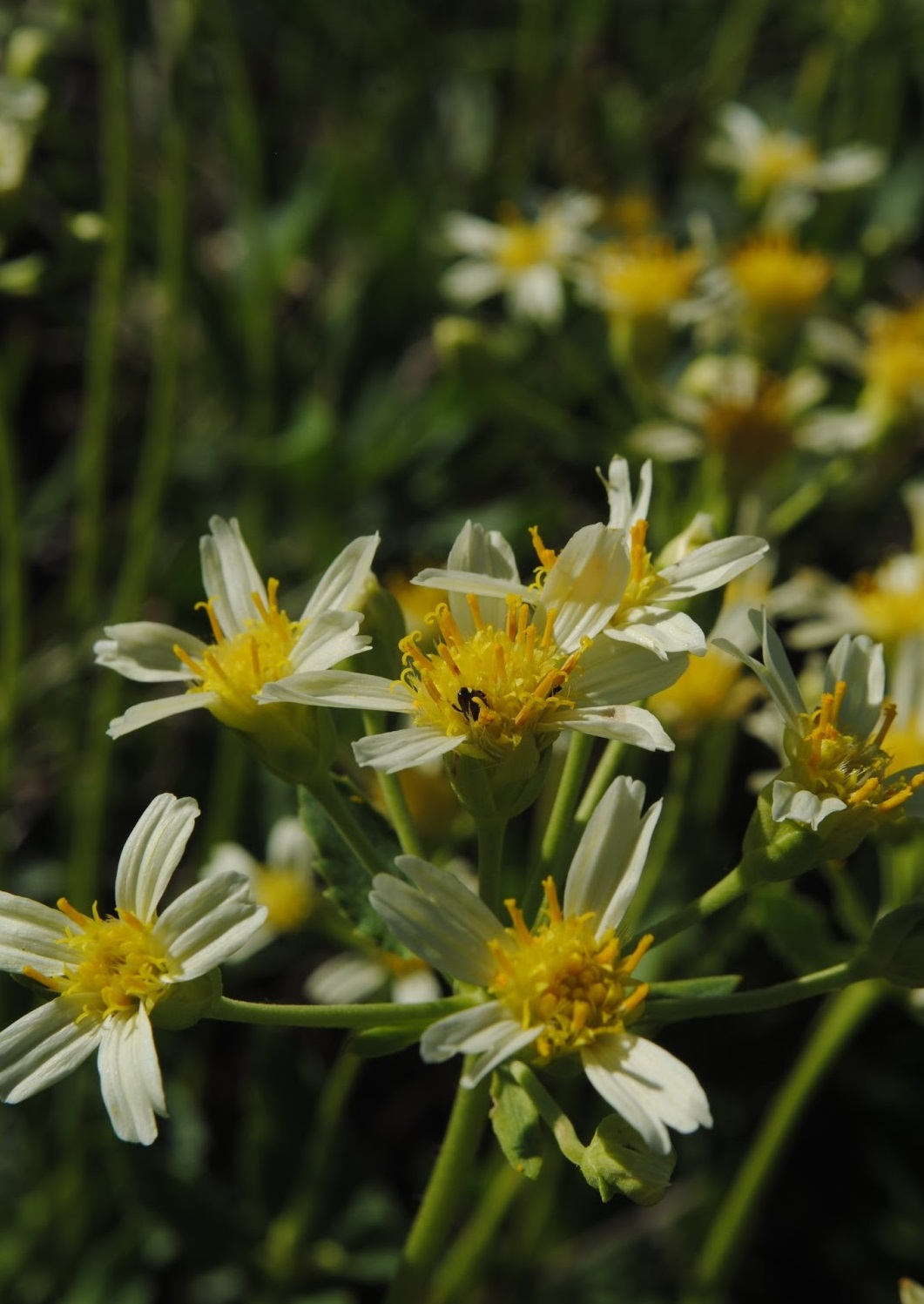
Calea cymosa

Calea ternifolia
