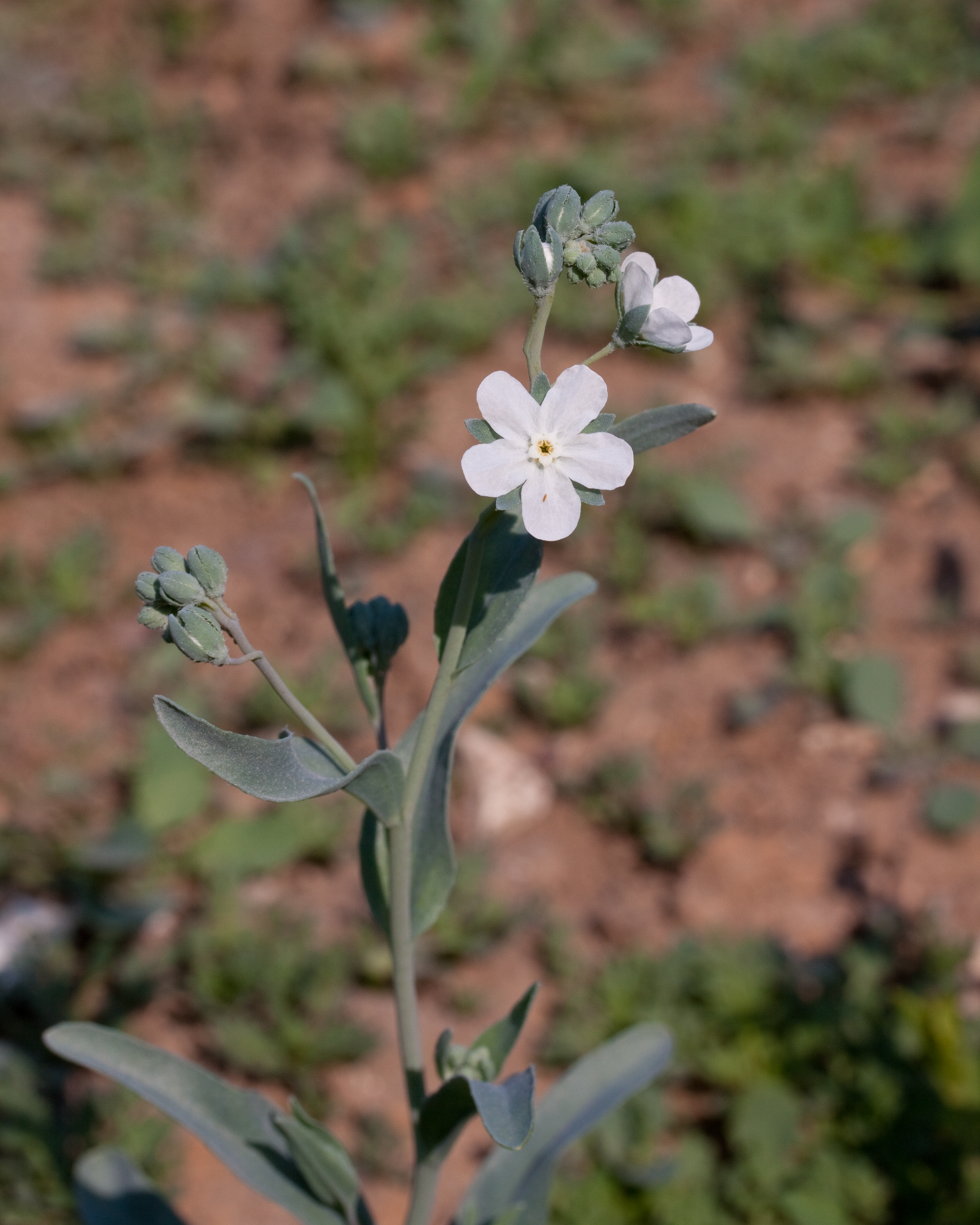
- Iberodes linifolia

Scientific classification
- Kingdom: Plantae
- Clade: Embryophytes
- Clade: Tracheophytes
- Clade: Spermatophytes
- Clade: Angiosperms
- Clade: Eudicots
- Clade: Asterids
- Order: Boraginales
- Family: Boraginaceae
- Subfamily: Cynoglossoideae
- Tribe: Omphalodeae
- Genus: Iberodes; Serrano, R. Carbajal & S. Ortiz

Species
- See text

= Iberodes =

Genus of flowering plants

Iberodes is a genus of flowering plants in the family Boraginaceae native to southwest Europe. The whiteflower navelwort is part of this genus. Most specimens are from the Iberian Peninsula. The genus was previously thought to be part of Omphalodes, and in 2016 was moved to its own. Iberodes kuzinskyana was assessed as vulnerable in 2010 and is now assessed as critically endangered by the Portuguese Botanical Society.

== Systematics ==
The recently added genus comprises about 5 species and 2 subspecies:

- Iberodes brassicifolia (Lag.) Serrano, R. Carbajal & S. Ortiz
- Iberodes commutata (G. López) Serrano, R. Carbajal & S. Ortiz
- Iberodes kuzinskyana (Willk.) Serrano, R. Carbajal & S. Ortiz
- Iberodes linifolia (L.) Serrano, R. Carbajal & S. Ortiz, the Whiteflower navelwort
- Iberodes littoralis (Lehm.) Serrano, R. Carbajal & S. Ortiz
  - Iberodes littoralis subsp. littoralis
  - Iberodes littoralis subsp. gallaecica (Laínz) Serrano, R. Carbajal & S. Ortiz
