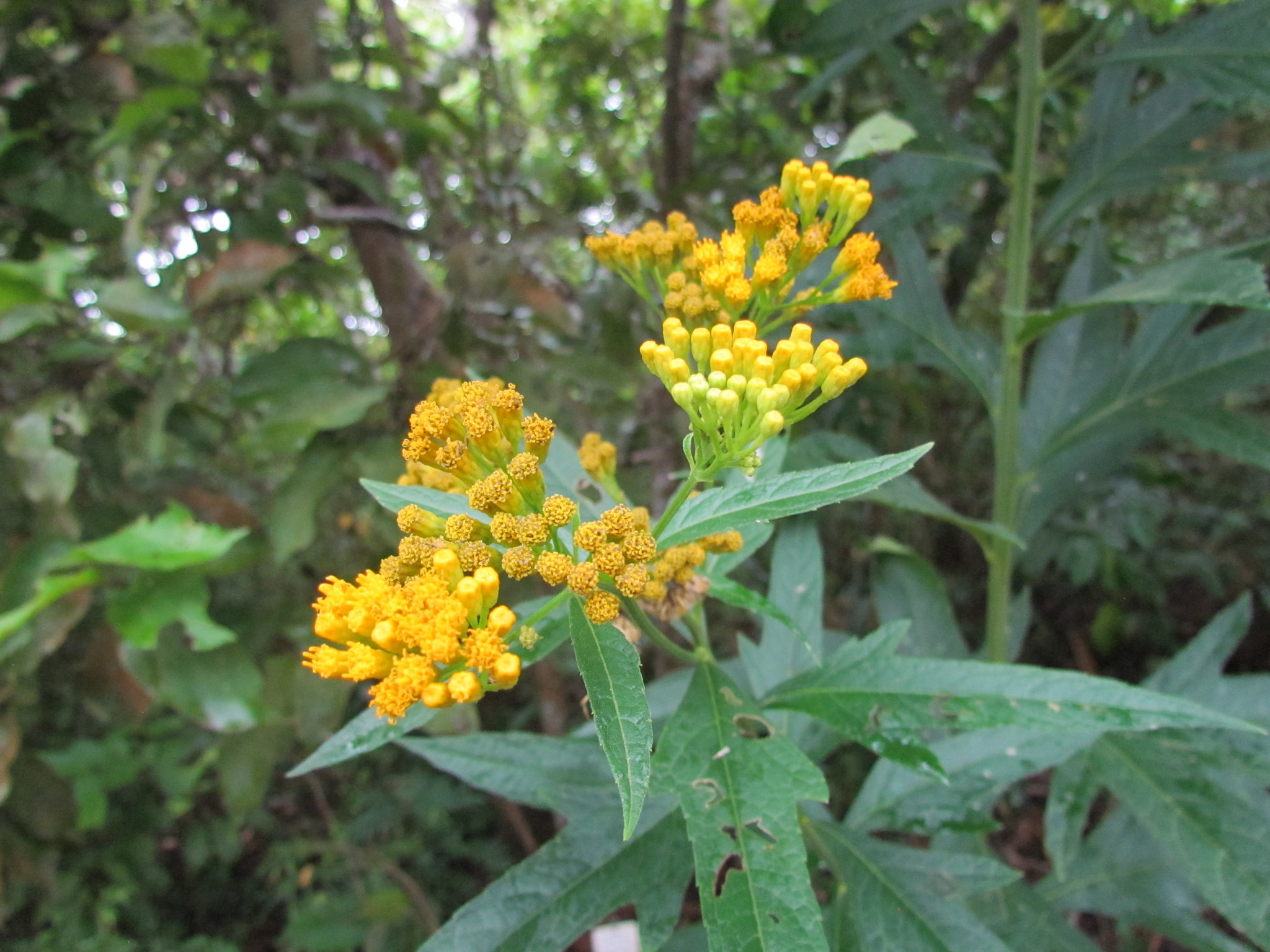
- Neurolaena lobata

Scientific classification
- Kingdom: Plantae
- Clade: Tracheophytes
- Clade: Angiosperms
- Clade: Eudicots
- Clade: Asterids
- Order: Asterales
- Family: Asteraceae
- Subfamily: Asteroideae
- Tribe: Neurolaeneae
- Genus: Neurolaena; R.Br. 1817 not B.L.Turner 1982

Type species
- Conyza lobata L.

Synonyms
- Neurochlaena Less.

= Neurolaena =

Genus of flowering plants

Neurolaena is a genus of flowering plants native to the Americas in the tribe Neurolaeneae within the family Asteraceae. The species that fall under this taxonomic genus occur from Mexico to Bolivia, including the Caribbean islands. The majority of Neurolaena are restricted to montane environments.

== Species ==
Species include:

- Neurolaena balsana - Guerrero
- Neurolaena cobanensis - Chiapas, Guatemala, Nicaragua, Costa Rica
- Neurolaena fulva - Chiapas, Oaxaca
- Neurolaena intermedia - Guatemala
- Neurolaena lamina - Oaxaca, Veracruz
- Neurolaena lobata - Chiapas, Oaxaca, Central America, West Indies, South America, Florida
- Neurolaena macrocephala - Oaxaca, Veracruz
- Neurolaena macrophylla - Guatemala, Chiapas
- Neurolaena oaxacana - Oaxaca
- Neurolaena schippii - Belize, Guatemala, Honduras
- Neurolaena venturana - Veracruz
- Neurolaena wendtii - Veracruz
- Neurolaena curtipalea - Yarumal, department of Antioquía, Colombia

=== formerly included ===
- Neurolaena indenii Sch.Bip. ex A.Gray - Schistocarpha eupatorioides (Fenzl) Kuntze
- Neurolaena liebmannii Sch.Bip. ex Klatt - Schistocarpha bicolor Less.
- Neurolaena lindenii Sch.Bip. ex A.Gray - Schistocarpha eupatorioides (Fenzl) Kuntze
- Neurolaena tenuifolia Sch.Bip. ex Klatt - Bartlettina karwinskiana (DC.) R.M.King & H.Rob.

(See Bartlettina and Schistocarpha.)
