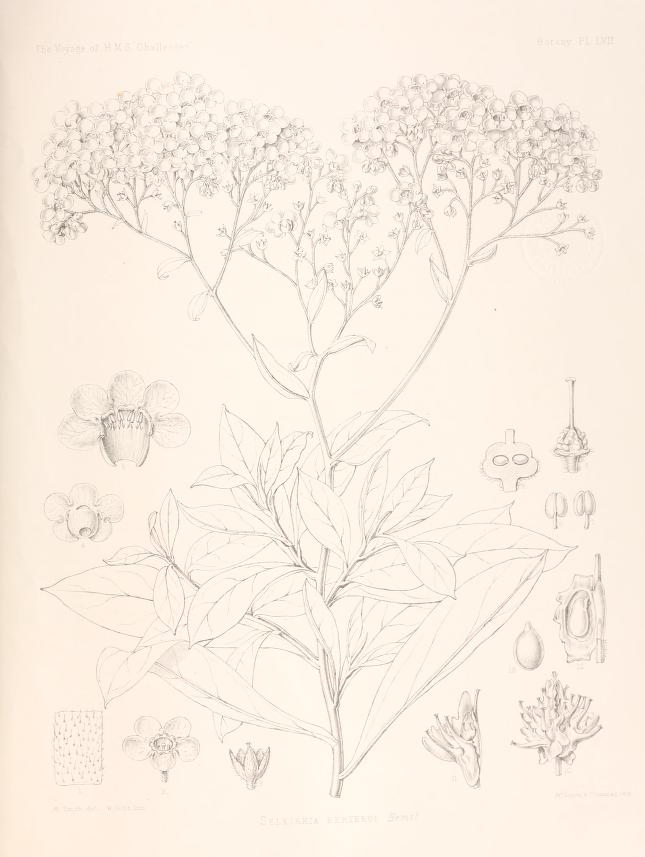
- Selkirkia berteroi

Scientific classification
- Kingdom: Plantae
- Clade: Tracheophytes
- Clade: Angiosperms
- Clade: Eudicots
- Clade: Asterids
- Order: Boraginales
- Family: Boraginaceae
- Subfamily: Boraginoideae
- Genus: Selkirkia; Hemsl., 1884

Type species
- Selkirkia berteroi (Colla) Hemsl.

= Selkirkia (plant) =

Genus of flowering plants

Selkirkia is a genus of flowering plants in the family Boraginaceae. Three species occur on the South American mainland and one, Selkirkia berteroi (sometimes written berteri), the first of the genus to be reported, is an endemic on Robinson Crusoe Island off the coast of Chile. It was previously considered a monotypic genus.

== Morphology ==
Selkirkia species are perennial, either a shrub (S. berteroi) or decumbent, ascending or erect herbs to subshrubs. The leaves are ovate to lanceolate, and mostly occurring along the stem, not in rosettes. The corolla is white (S. berteroi) or blue to violet. The fruits consist of four nutlets, which are beset with barbed glochids, and superficially similar to the fruits of hound's tongues. The fruits of S. berteroi are somewhat winged and seemingly attached to the style but in fact, like the other three species, on a pyramidal gynobase.

== Distribution and conservation ==
The four species occur in forested areas of South America and Robinson Crusoe Island. Selkirkia berteroi is an endemic shrub on Robinson Crusoe Island, and due to the narrow distribution to be considered critically endangered according to IUCN criteria. Selkirkia trianae is a species in the undergrowth of dense, primary cloud forests of Colombia and Ecuador. Although there are not many data, land conversion into pastures might pose a threat to the species. The remaining two species, Selkirkia limense and Selkirkia pauciflora occur in the forests of the Mediterranean climates of Chile. They are likely endangered (not officially assessed though) due to deforestation and land conversion for agriculture.

== Systematics ==
Boraginaceae systematics relied strongly on fruit morphology, so all four species were initially thought to belong to Cynoglossum, where the four nutlets typically are beset with barbed glochidia. However, fruit morphology turned out to be unreliable for classification. When Selkirkia pauciflora (under its illegitimate name Cynoglossum paniculatum) was found to be closely related to Myosotidium hortensia and Omphalodes, Serrano et al. placed the species into a new genus, Mapuchea. However, after inclusion of the two other native South American "Cynoglossum" species and Selkirkia berteroi, it turned out that these four species are closely related to each other and sister to Myosotidium hortensia. Due to the similar growth habit (more or less shrubby) and the glochidiate nutlets, the four species are now considered as more widely circumscribed genus Selkirkia.
