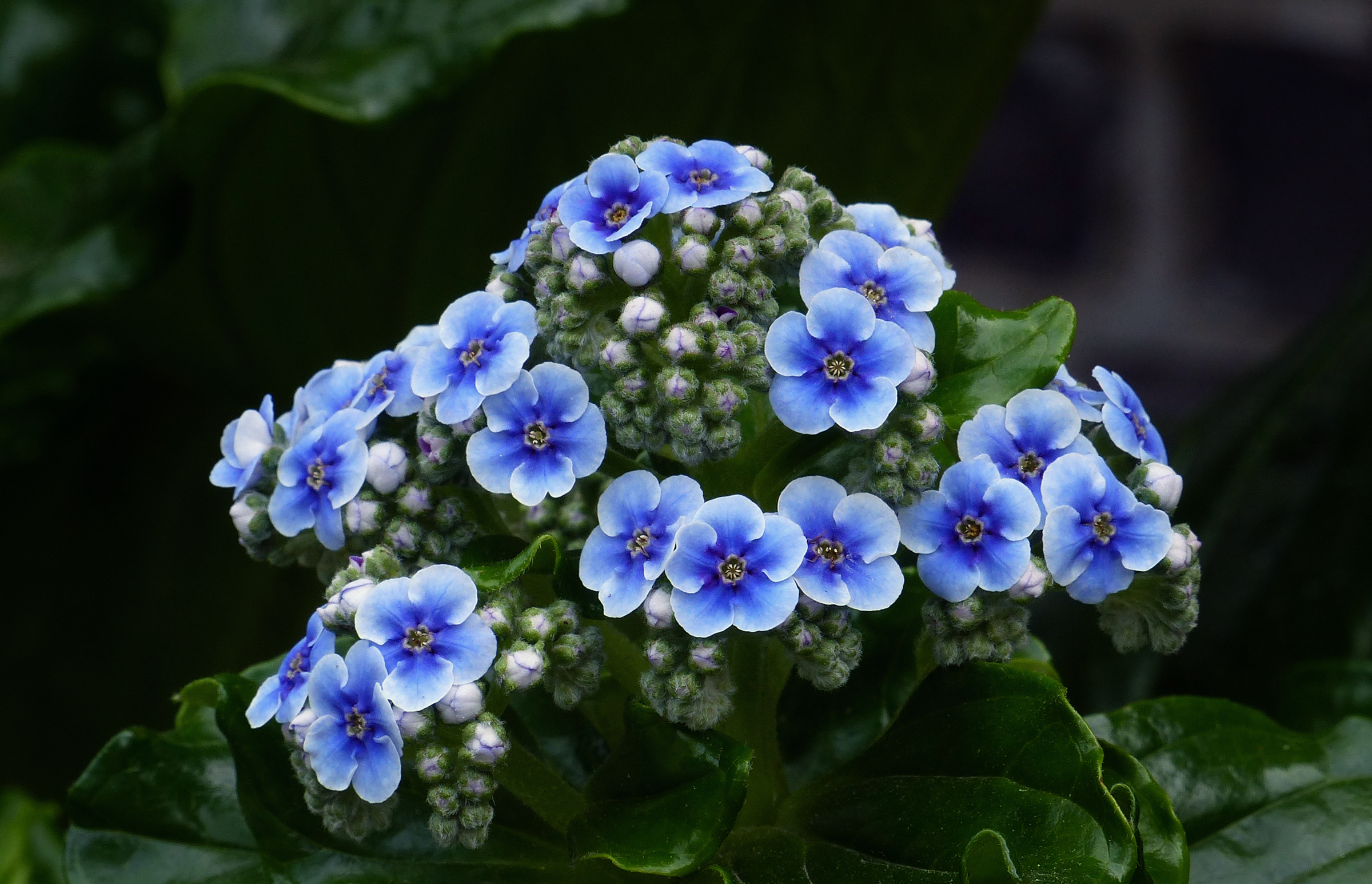

Scientific classification
- Kingdom: Plantae
- Clade: Embryophytes
- Clade: Tracheophytes
- Clade: Spermatophytes
- Clade: Angiosperms
- Clade: Eudicots
- Clade: Asterids
- Order: Boraginales
- Family: Boraginaceae
- Genus: Myosotidium; Hook.
- Species: M. hortensia

Binomial name
- Myosotidium hortensia (Decne.) Baill.

Synonyms
- Myosotis hortensia Decne. Cynoglossum cyaneum Hook.f. Cynoglossum nobile Hook.f. Myosotidium nobile (Hook.f.) Hook.

= Myosotidium =

Monotypic genus of plants in the borage family

Myosotidium is a genus of plants belonging to the family Boraginaceae. This genus is represented by the single species Myosotidium hortensia, the Chatham Islands lily, giant forget-me-not or Chatham Islands forget-me-not, which is endemic to the Chatham Islands, New Zealand. In the Māori language, it is known by the name kopukapuka.

The biogeography is yet unresolved, but its ancestors may have originated from the American continent, as Myosotidium hortensia was found to be sister to the South American plant genus Selkirkia and both genera being sister to the North American genus Mimophytum. Myosotidium hortensia is a fleshy herb with large orbicular somewhat fleshy leaves and apparently parallel leaf venation. The inflorescence bears numerous blue flowers in the late spring. The relatively large blackish seeds are winged. It is much planted as a garden ornamental flower in New Zealand and elsewhere. In addition to the blue-flowered species, 'Alba', a white flowered cultivar is also popular in cultivation. In its natural habitat, M. hortensia occurs near beaches under the direct influence of sea-water spray and sea-winds.
