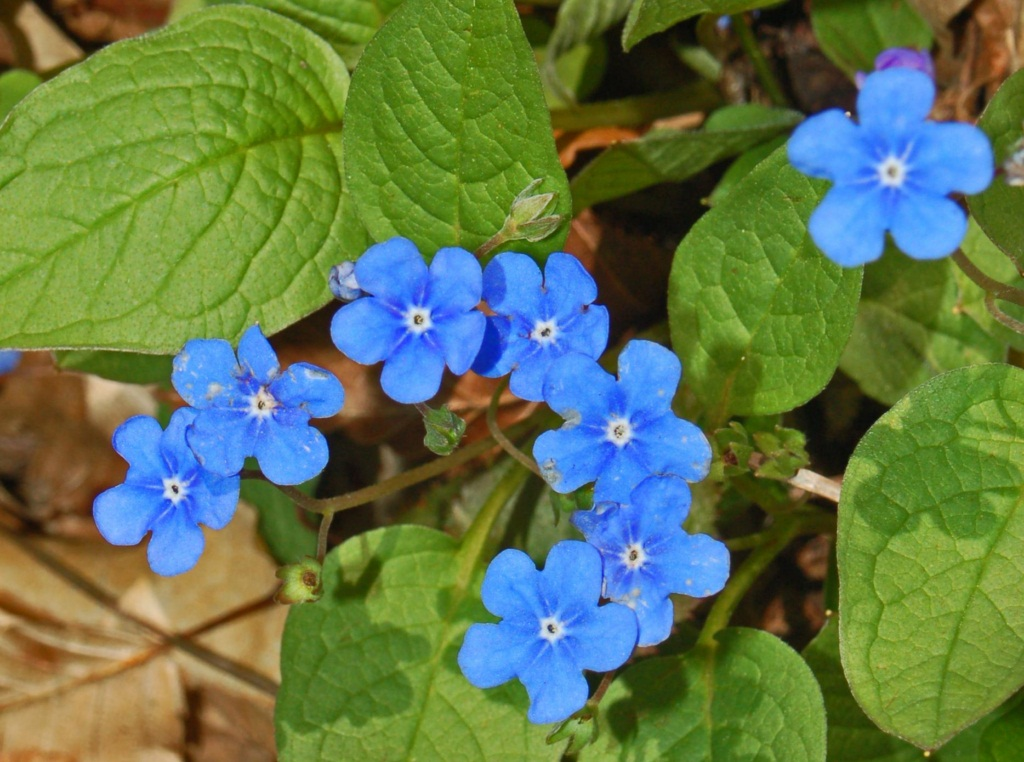

Scientific classification
- Kingdom: Plantae
- Clade: Tracheophytes
- Clade: Angiosperms
- Clade: Eudicots
- Clade: Asterids
- Order: Boraginales
- Family: Boraginaceae
- Genus: Omphalodes
- Species: O. verna

Binomial name
- Omphalodes verna Moench

Synonyms
- Cynoglossum omphaloides L.

= Omphalodes verna =

Species of flowering plant

Omphalodes verna, the creeping navelwort or blue-eyed-Mary, is a rhizomatous herbaceous perennial plant in the genus Omphalodes belonging to the family Boraginaceae.

== Etymology ==
The genus name Omphalodes derives from the Greek word omphalòs, meaning navel, referring to the shape of the small fruits, while the name verna of the species, deriving from the Latin vernus, refers to the early blooming flowers.

== Description ==
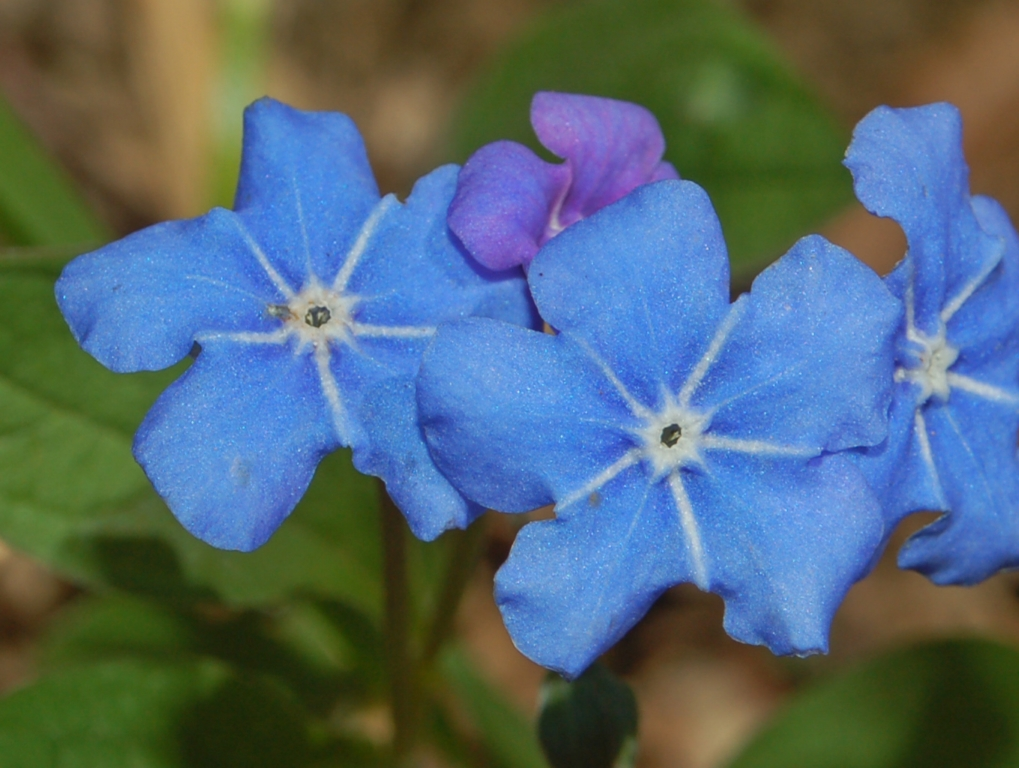

Omphalodes verna can reach 20–30 centimetres (7.9–11.8 in) in height. The stem snakes across the ground (hence the alternative name of creeping forget-me-not). The overwintering buds are situated just below the soil surface (hemicryptophyte). This species can spread quickly, it is hard to uproot and by some accounts may even be invasive, but mostly coexists with other plants well.

Its leaves are grooved, semi-evergreen and medium green, about 30 millimetres (1.2 in) long and 20 millimetres (0.79 in) wide. They are veiny, with fine hairs and oval to heart in shape, and pointed at the tip.

In Spring the plant produces clusters of 3-5 petiolated small, light blue hermaphrodite flowers with white or yellow star-shaped centers. The wheel-shaped corolla is fused and five-lobed and has a diameter of 7–15 millimetres (0.28–0.59 in). These plants bloom from March through May. The mericarps are hairy and navel-shaped, about 2 millimetres (0.079 in) long.

Creeping navelwort is cultivated in many countries as an ornamental plant. It may be easily propagated from seeds. It may be confused with forget-me-not (Myosotis sp.), as flowers are very similar, but it can be distinguished by its much larger and coarser, slightly prickly leaves, its firm grip with the ground, and its quite different fruits, which are not covered in fine hooked hairs to assist in transport as forget-me-not fruits are.

== Distribution ==
It is widespread in central and south-eastern Europe, excluding the Pyrenees. It is also present in Quebec, Canada.

== Habitat ==
This species typically grows in the shade of trees, in fresh mountain forests (especially beech), wastelands and scrublands. The plant prefers sandy or clay loam and moist soils in shady places, at an altitude of 0–1,300 metres (0–4,265 ft) above sea level.

== Gallery ==
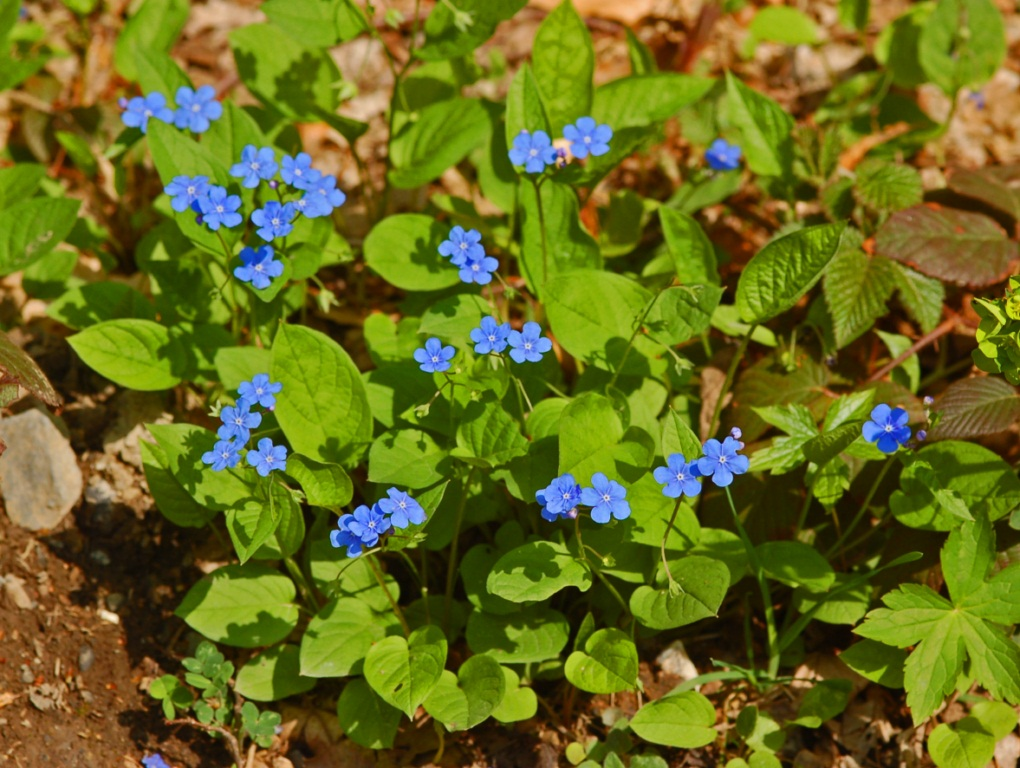

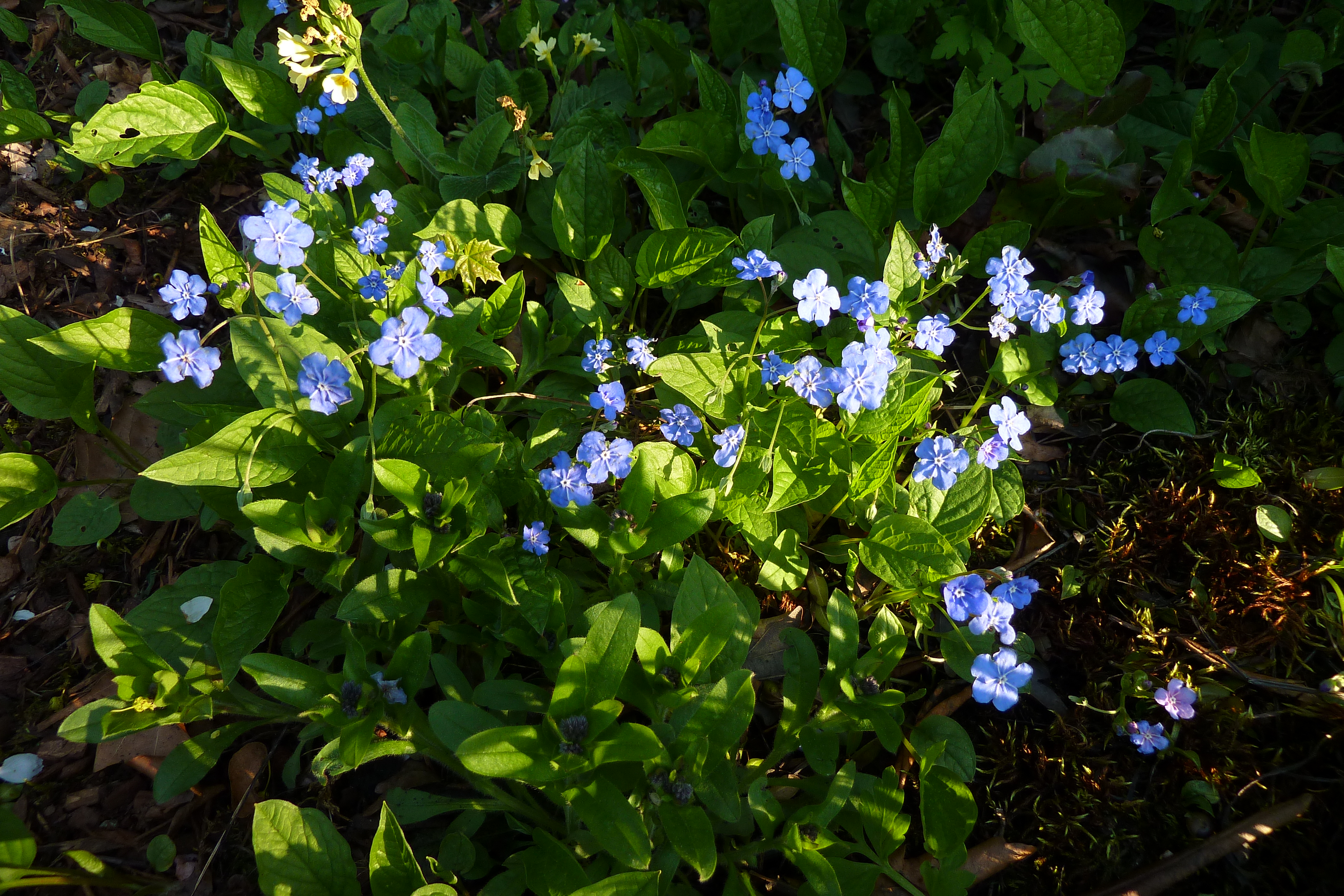

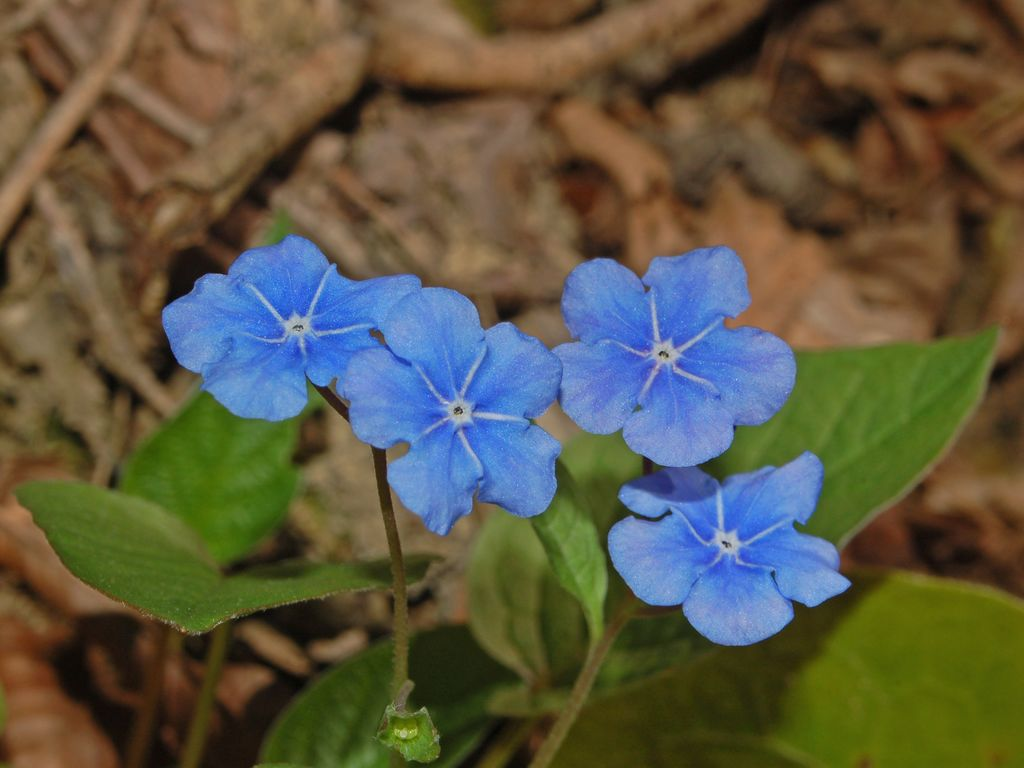

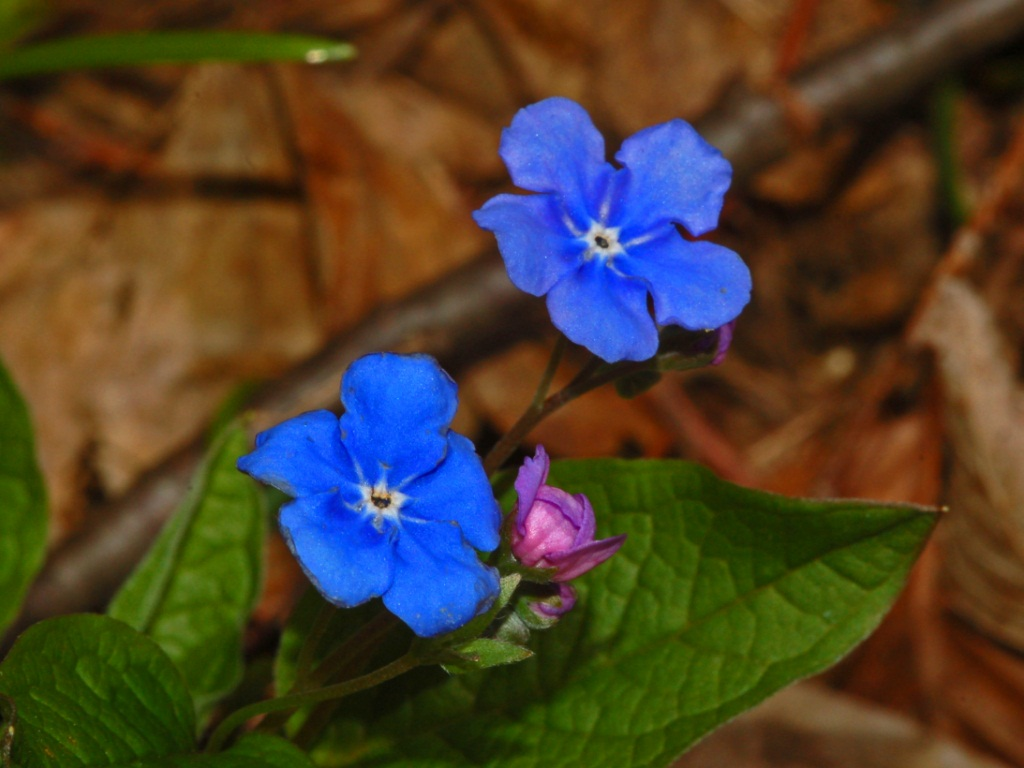

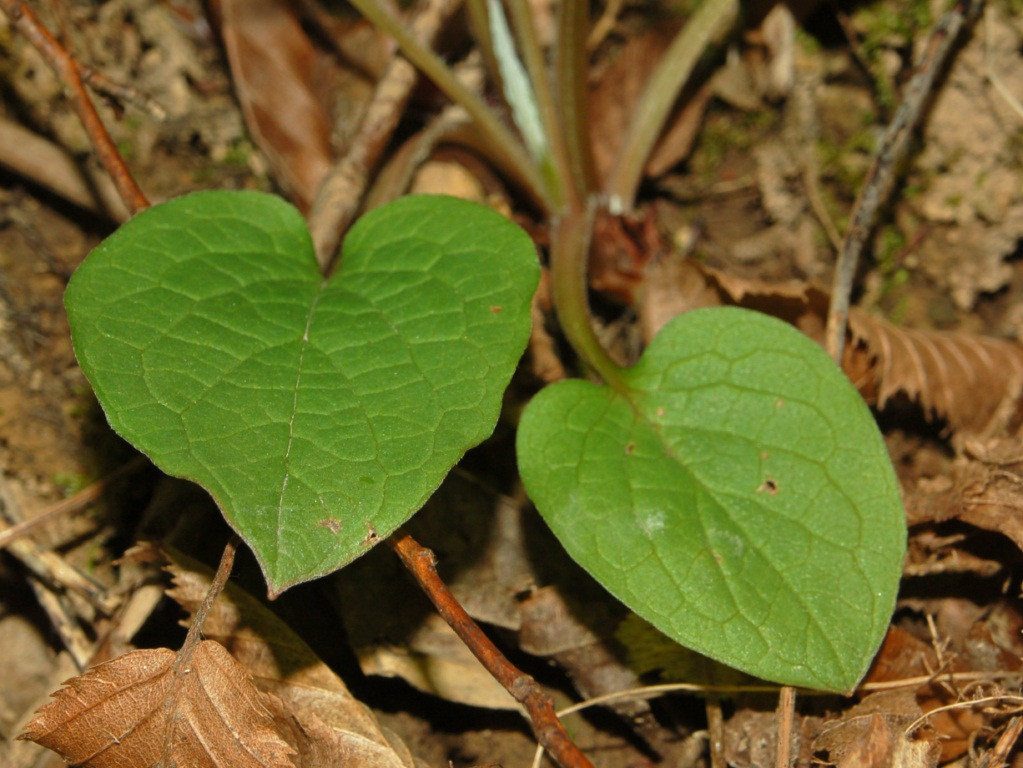
