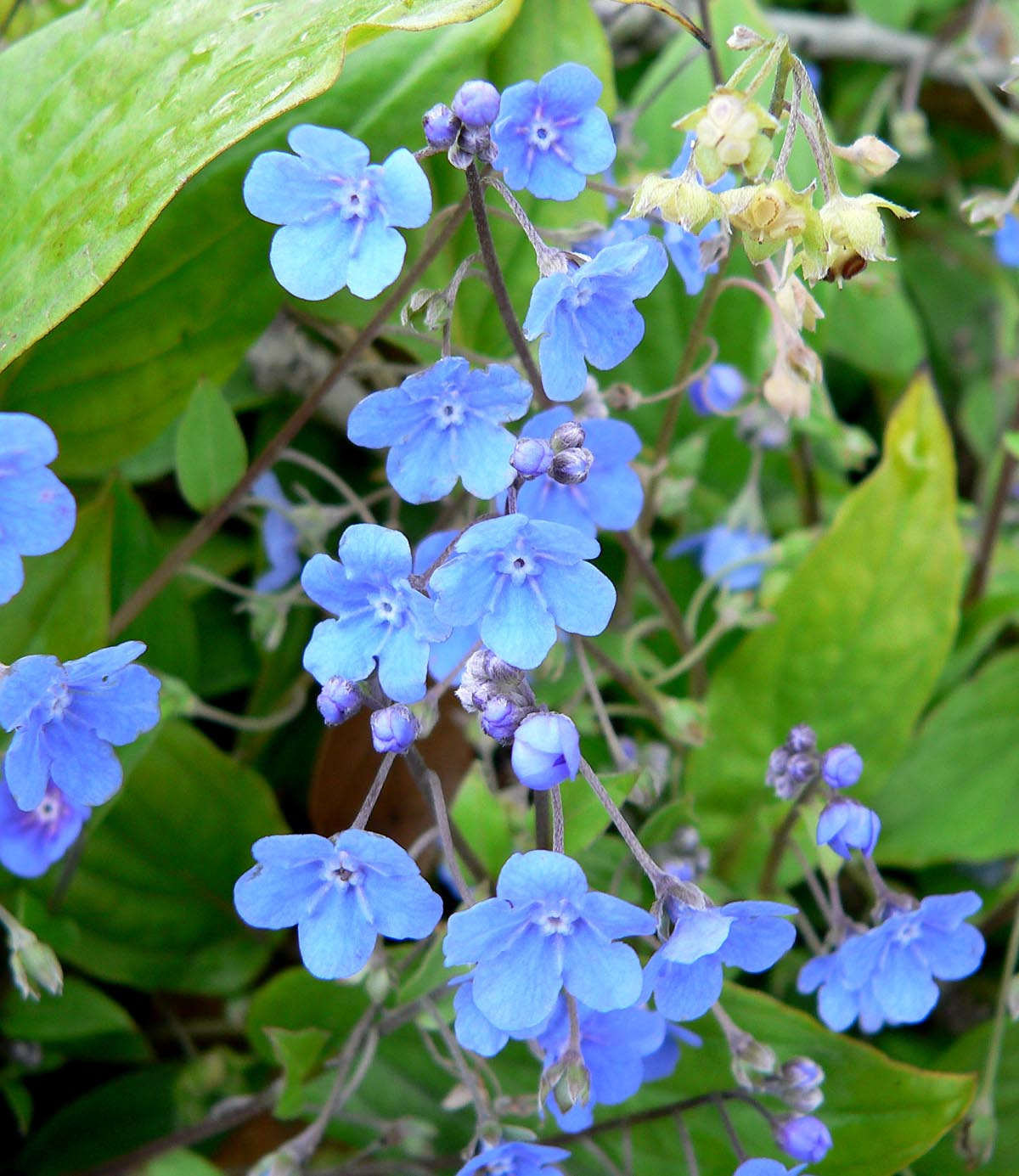
- University of California Botanical Garden

Scientific classification
- Kingdom: Plantae
- Clade: Tracheophytes
- Clade: Angiosperms
- Clade: Eudicots
- Clade: Asterids
- Order: Boraginales
- Family: Boraginaceae
- Genus: Omphalodes
- Species: O. cappadocica

Binomial name
- Omphalodes cappadocica DC.

= Omphalodes cappadocica =

Species of flowering plant

Omphalodes cappadocica, the Cappadocian navelwort, is a species of flowering plant in the family Boraginaceae, native to woodland habitats in Turkey. It is an evergreen perennial growing to 25 cm (10 in) tall by 40 cm (16 in) wide, with slightly hairy, oval pointed leaves and loose terminal racemes of bright blue flowers with white eyes, similar to forget-me-nots, appearing in spring.

This plant is valued in cultivation as groundcover for moist, shady situations, such as woodland plantings. The species and the cultivar 'Cherry Ingram' are recipients of the Royal Horticultural Society's Award of Garden Merit.

== Etymology ==
Omphalodes is derived from Greek and means 'navel-like'; this is a reference to the shape of the fruit of navel wort.

Cappadocica means 'from Cappadocia, Asia Minor (Turkey).
