= Staurochlamys =

Scientific classification
- Kingdom: Plantae
- Clade: Tracheophytes
- Clade: Angiosperms
- Clade: Eudicots
- Clade: Asterids
- Order: Asterales
- Family: Asteraceae
- Subfamily: Asteroideae
- Tribe: Neurolaeneae
- Genus: Staurochlamys; Baker
- Species: S. burchellii

Binomial name
- Staurochlamys burchellii Baker

Genus of plants

Staurochlamys is a genus of flowering plants in the tribe Neurolaeneae within the family Asteraceae.

Species

The only known species is Staurochlamys burchellii, native to Brazil (States of Tocantins, Goiás, Maranhão, Piauí)
