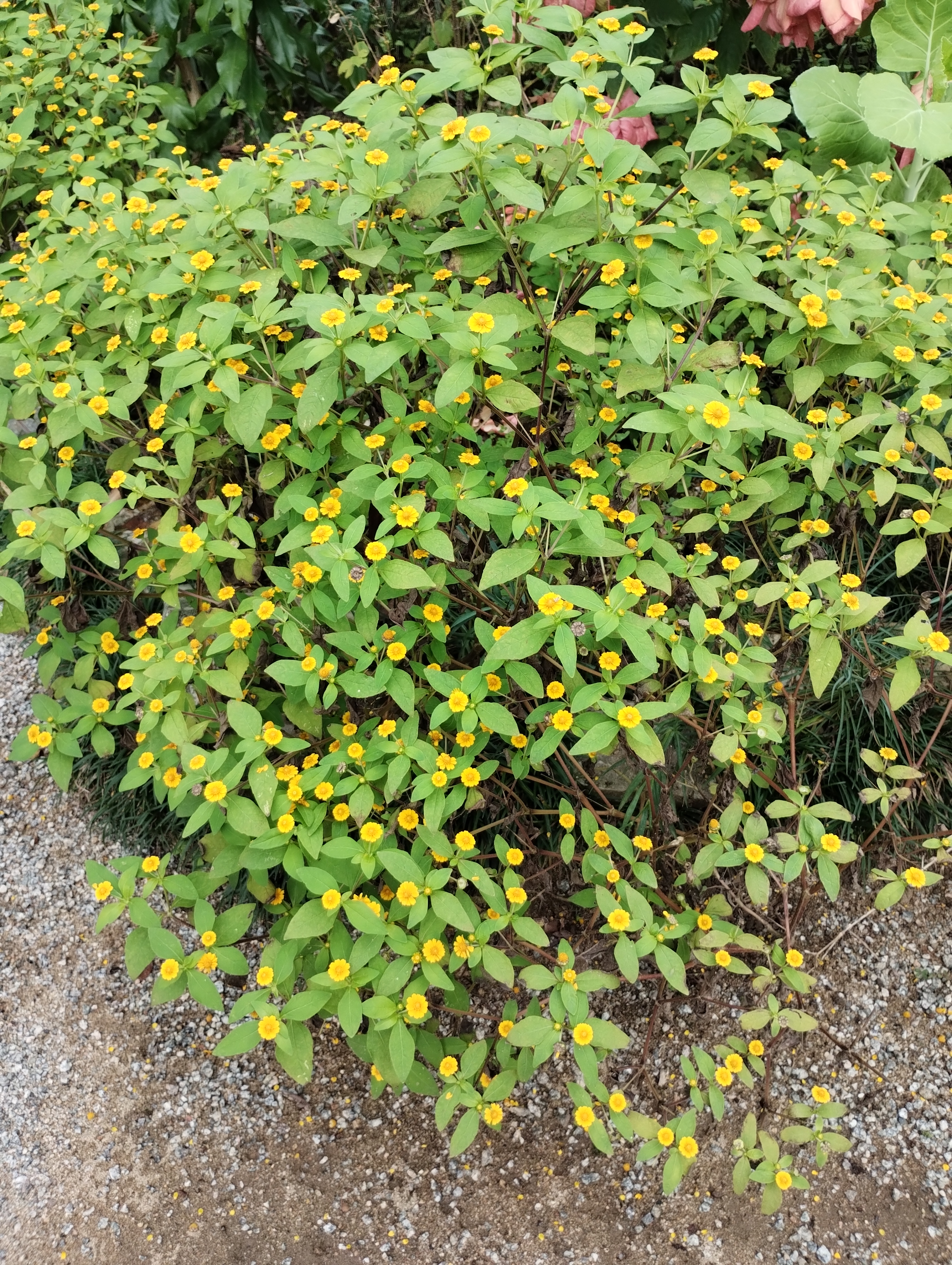
- Unxia suffruticosa

Scientific classification
- Kingdom: Plantae
- Clade: Embryophytes
- Clade: Tracheophytes
- Clade: Spermatophytes
- Clade: Angiosperms
- Clade: Eudicots
- Clade: Asterids
- Order: Asterales
- Family: Asteraceae
- Subfamily: Asteroideae
- Tribe: Neurolaeneae
- Genus: Unxia; L.f.

Type species
- Unxia camphorata L.f.

= Unxia (plant) =

Genus of plants

Unxia L.f. is a genus of flowering plants in the family Asteraceae.

Species:

- Unxia camphorata L.f.
- Unxia suffruticosa (Baker) Stuessy
