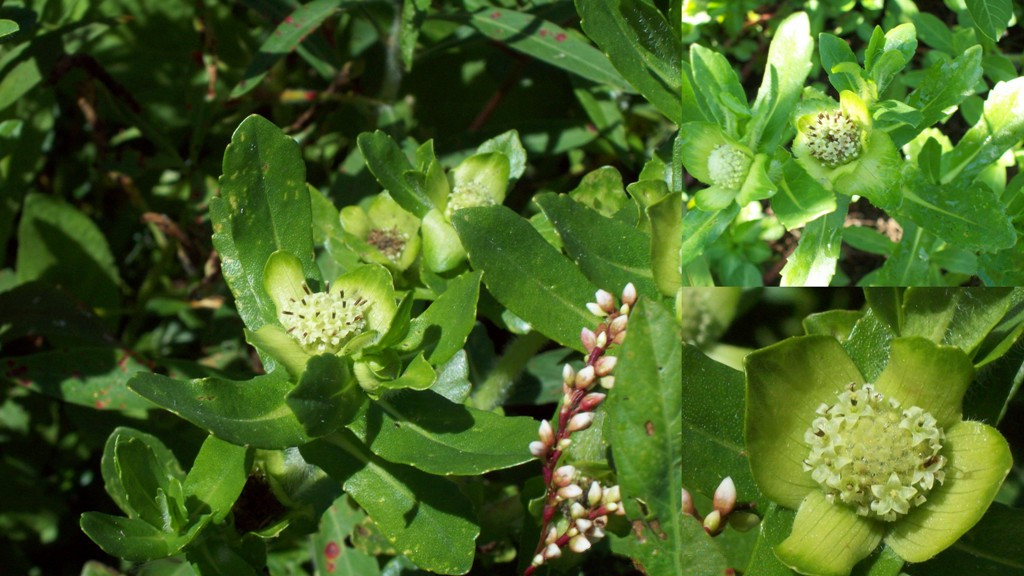
- Endyra fluctuans

Scientific classification
- Kingdom: Plantae
- Clade: Embryophytes
- Clade: Tracheophytes
- Clade: Angiosperms
- Clade: Eudicots
- Clade: Asterids
- Order: Asterales
- Family: Asteraceae
- Subfamily: Asteroideae
- Tribe: Neurolaeneae
- Genus: Enydra; Lour.

Type species
- Enydra fluctuans Lour.

Synonyms
- Cryphiospermum P.Beauv.; Hingtsha Roxb.; Meyera Schreb.; Phyllimena Blume ex DC.; Sobreyra Ruiz & Pav.; Tetraotis Reinw.; Wahlenbergia Schumach.

= Enydra (plant) =

Genus of flowering plants

Enydra is a genus of flowering plants in the Asteraceae, or daisy, family. They are native to the Asian, African and American Tropics and Sub-Tropics.

Species

- Enydra fluctuans Lour. – Asian and African Subtropics & Tropics, naturalised extensively American Tropics
- Enydra integrifolia Gardner – Venezuela
- Enydra radicans (Willd.) Lack – Ethiopia, W. Tropical Africa, Peru, Brazil (Ceará, Pernambuco, Bahia)
- Enydra sessilifolia (Ruiz & Pav.) Cabrera – Peru to Ecuador, Galápagos, Mexico (Tabasco)
- Enydra sessilis DC. – Argentina (Corrientes) to Brazil (Rio Grande do Sul), Caribbean, introduced to Madagascar
