= Memoremea =

Scientific classification
- Kingdom: Plantae
- Clade: Tracheophytes
- Clade: Angiosperms
- Clade: Eudicots
- Clade: Asterids
- Order: Boraginales
- Family: Boraginaceae
- Genus: Memoremea; A.Otero, Jim.Mejías, Valcárcel & P.Vargas (2014)
- Species: M. scorpioides

Binomial name
- Memoremea scorpioides (Haenke) A.Otero, Jim.Mejías, Valcárcel & P.Vargas (2014)

Synonyms
- Cynoglossum scorpioides Haenke (1789); Omphalium scorpioides (Haenke) Roth (1827); Omphalodes scorpioides (Haenke) Schrank (1812); Picotia scorpioides (Haenke) Roem. & Schult. (1819)

Genus of plants

Memoremea scorpioides is a species of flowering plant belonging to the family Boraginaceae. It is the sole species in genus Memoremea. Its native range is eastern-central and eastern Europe.

The species was first named Cynoglossum scorpioides by Thaddäus Haenke in 1789. It was later renamed Omphalodes scorpioides. A 2014 phylogenetic study concluded that the species formed a distinct lineage from the other species in Omphalodes, and it was placed in the new genus Memoremea.
