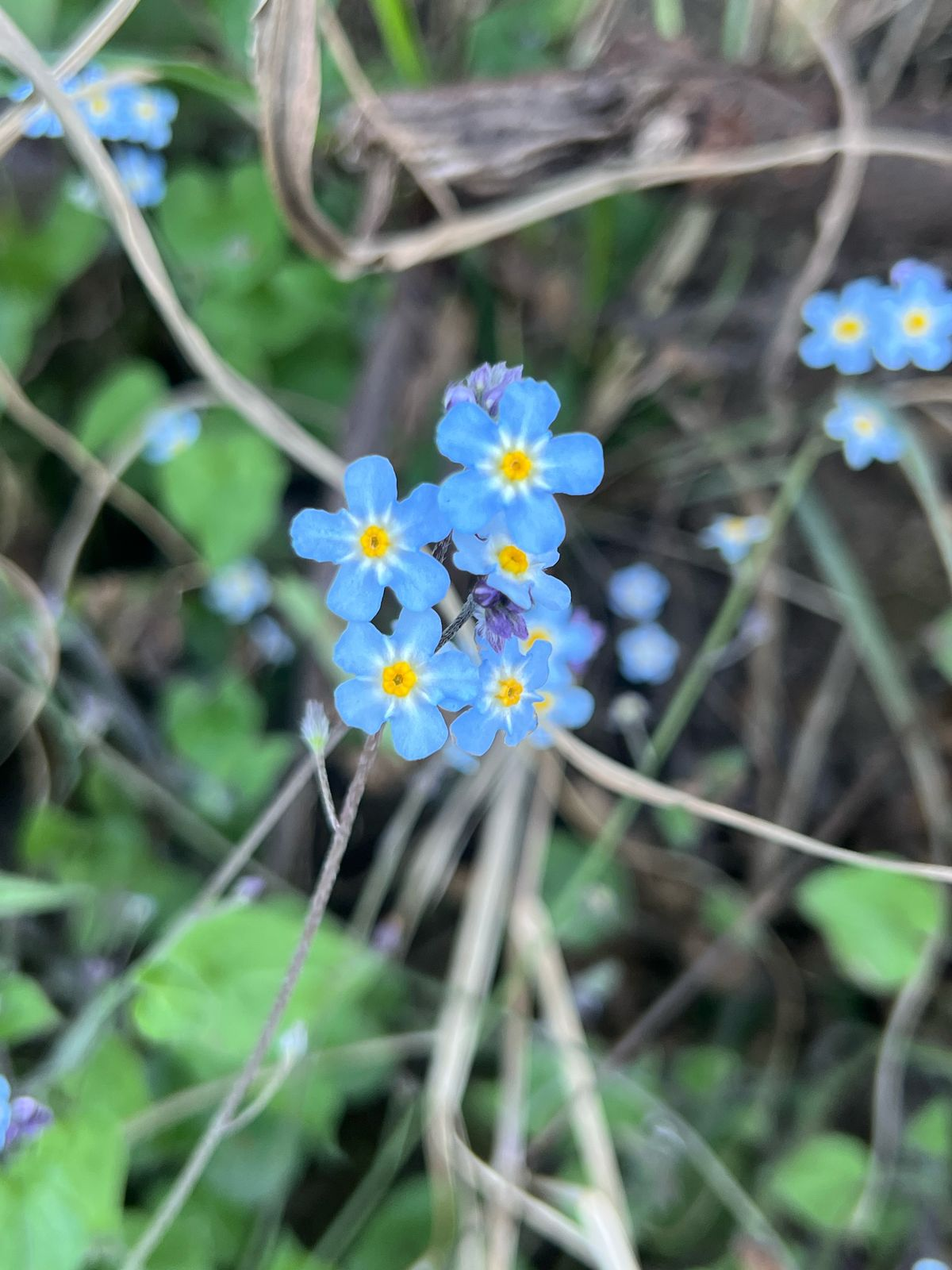
- Mimophytum sp.

Scientific classification
- Kingdom: Plantae
- Clade: Embryophytes
- Clade: Tracheophytes
- Clade: Spermatophytes
- Clade: Angiosperms
- Clade: Eudicots
- Clade: Asterids
- Order: Boraginales
- Family: Boraginaceae
- Subfamily: Boraginoideae
- Genus: Mimophytum; Greenm. (1905)

Type species
- Mimophytum omphalodoides Greenm.

Species
- 11; see text

= Mimophytum =

Genus of flowering plants in the borage family

Mimophytum is a genus of flowering plants in the family Boraginaceae. The species are native to northeastern Mexico and adjacent areas of Texas, United States. They are similar to the closely related genus Omphalodes but a distinct group.

== Morphology ==
Mimophytum species are (sub-)perennial herbs, either with a rhizome or erect. The leaves have petioles and are heart-shaped or rhombic. They produce blue flowers similar to forget-me-nots. The fruits consist of four winged nutlets. The nutlet wing can be turned upwards, creating a navel-like shape, similar to the fruits of Omphalodes. In two species, M. alienum and M. alienoides, there are two differently shaped fruits: two navel-like nutlets and two nutlets with flat wings. In three species, M. omphalodoides, M. benitomartinezii, and M. richardsonii, the wings of the navel-shaped nutlets are beset with small barbed glochidia.

== Species ==
11 species are accepted.

- Mimophytum alienoides (G.L.Nesom) Holstein & Weigend
- Mimophytum alienum (A.Gray ex Hemsl.) R.R.Mill ex Holstein & Weigend
- Mimophytum australe (G.L.Nesom) R.R.Mill ex Holstein & Weigend
- Mimophytum benitomartinezii Pérez-Calix & Pat.-Sicil.
- Mimophytum cardiophyllum (A.Gray ex Hemsl.) R.R.Mill ex Holstein & Weigend
- Mimophytum carranzae (G.L.Nesom) Holstein & Weigend
- Mimophytum chiangii (L.C.Higgins) Holstein & Weigend
- Mimophytum erectum (I.M.Johnst.) A.Otero, Jim.Mejías, Valcárcel & P.Vargas
- Mimophytum mexicanum (S.Watson) R.R.Mill ex Holstein & Weigend
- Mimophytum omphalodoides Greenm.
- Mimophytum richardsonii (G.L.Nesom) G.L.Nesom

== Systematics ==
The barbed glochidia on the nutlet wing was a character that led Greenman to describe his new species, Mimophytum omphalodoides, in new genus. However, Greenman already recognized the similarity of many characters of his new species to Omphalodes. The species without these glochidiate nutlet wings were considered as belonging to Omphalodes, but the similarity was always recognized. New phylogenetic work showed that the native Mexican and Texan "Omphalodes" species are a clade, distinct from the true Omphalodes from Europe. A later phylogenetic placement of the type species of Mimophytum within the North American clade of Omphalodes confirmed the suggested close relationship, leading to the taxonomic transfer of most of the native North American Omphalodes names to Mimophytum. A single remaining Omphalodes species from Mexico, O. erecta was initially excluded from this process, because it is morphologically too deviant to infer an unequivocal classification to Mimophytum from morphology alone. A phylogenetic study published in 2019 confirmed that O. erecta belongs to the Mimophytum clade, and it was renamed Mimophytum erectum.
