= Nihon (plant) =

Scientific classification
- Kingdom: Plantae
- Clade: Tracheophytes
- Clade: Angiosperms
- Clade: Eudicots
- Clade: Asterids
- Order: Boraginales
- Family: Boraginaceae
- Tribe: Cynoglosseae
- Genus: Nihon; A.Otero, Jim.Mejías, Valcárcel & P.Vargas (2014)

Species
- Nihon akiensis (Kadota) A.Otero, Jim.Mejías, Valcárcel & P.Vargas; Nihon japonicum (Thunb.) A.Otero, Jim.Mejías, Valcárcel & P.Vargas; Nihon krameri (Franch. & Sav.) A.Otero, Jim.Mejías, Valcárcel & P.Vargas; Nihon laevispermum (Nakai) A.Otero, Jim.Mejías, Valcárcel & P.Vargas; Nihon proliferum (Ohwi) A.Otero, Jim.Mejías, Valcárcel & P.Vargas

Genus of flowering plants

Nihon is a genus of flowering plants in the family Boraginaceae. It includes five species native to Japan (5 species) and Korea (1 species).

- Nihon akiensis (Kadota) A.Otero, Jim.Mejías, Valcárcel & P.Vargas – Japan (Honshu)
- Nihon japonicum (Thunb.) A.Otero, Jim.Mejías, Valcárcel & P.Vargas – central and southern Japan
- Nihon krameri (Franch. & Sav.) A.Otero, Jim.Mejías, Valcárcel & P.Vargas – southern Korea and Japan (southern Hokkaido and northern and central Honshu)
- Nihon laevispermum (Nakai) A.Otero, Jim.Mejías, Valcárcel & P.Vargas – Japan (central Honshu)
- Nihon proliferum (Ohwi) A.Otero, Jim.Mejías, Valcárcel & P.Vargas – Japan (western and central Honshu)

The species in the genus were previously placed in genus Omphalodes. A 2014 phylogenetic study concluded that these five formed a distinct lineage. The new genus was given the name Nihon, the Japanese name for Japan.
