= Calea huigrensis =

Conservation status
- Endangered (IUCN 3.1)

Scientific classification
- Kingdom: Plantae
- Clade: Tracheophytes
- Clade: Angiosperms
- Clade: Eudicots
- Clade: Asterids
- Order: Asterales
- Family: Asteraceae
- Genus: Calea
- Species: C. huigrensis

Binomial name
- Calea huigrensis S.F.Blake

Species of flowering plant

Calea huigrensis is a species of flowering plant in the aster family, Asteraceae. It is endemic to Ecuador, where it is known from two collections made in Chimborazo Province over 80 years ago. It is a shrub which was recorded in dry habitat in the Andes. It is threatened by habitat destruction.
