= Calea kingii =

Conservation status
- Vulnerable (IUCN 3.1)

Scientific classification
- Kingdom: Plantae
- Clade: Tracheophytes
- Clade: Angiosperms
- Clade: Eudicots
- Clade: Asterids
- Order: Asterales
- Family: Asteraceae
- Genus: Calea
- Species: C. kingii

Binomial name
- Calea kingii H.Rob.

Species of flowering plant

Calea kingii is a species of shrub in the aster family, Asteraceae. It is endemic to Ecuador, where it is known from five subpopulations in the high-elevation forests of the central Andes. It is threatened by habitat destruction.
