= Greenmaniella =

Scientific classification
- Kingdom: Plantae
- Clade: Tracheophytes
- Clade: Angiosperms
- Clade: Eudicots
- Clade: Asterids
- Order: Asterales
- Family: Asteraceae
- Subfamily: Asteroideae
- Tribe: Neurolaeneae
- Genus: Greenmaniella; W.M.Sharp
- Species: G. resinosa

Binomial name
- Greenmaniella resinosa (S.Wats.) W.M.Sharp

Synonyms
- Zaluzania resinosa S.Wats.

Genus of flowering plants

Greenmaniella is a genus of flowering plants in the daisy family.

The genus is named in honor of US botanist Jesse More Greenman (1867-1951), formerly of the Missouri Botanical Garden.

Species

There is only one known species, Greenmaniella resinosa, native to the state of Nuevo León in northeastern Mexico.
