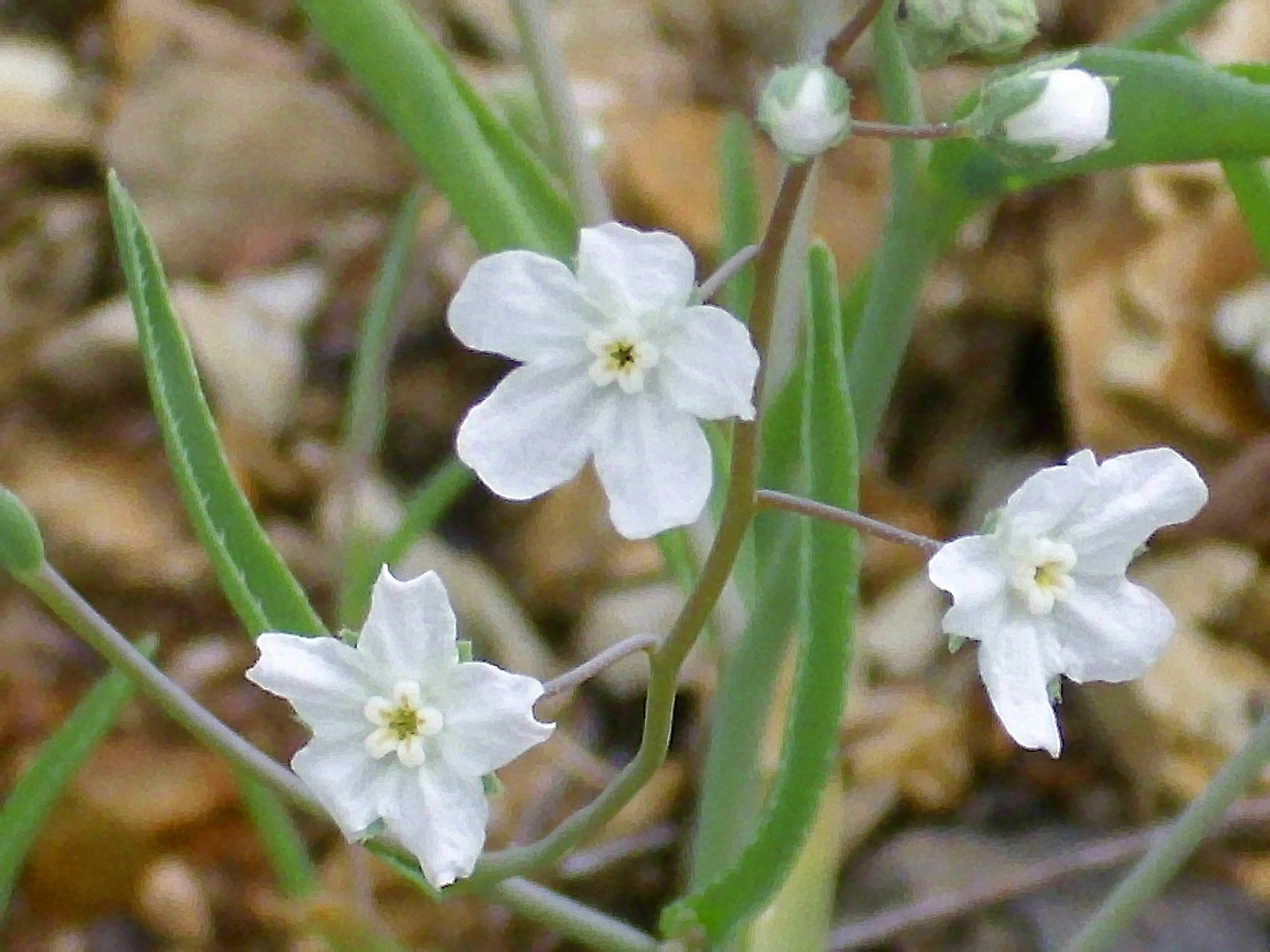

Scientific classification
- Kingdom: Plantae
- Clade: Tracheophytes
- Clade: Angiosperms
- Clade: Eudicots
- Clade: Asterids
- Order: Boraginales
- Family: Boraginaceae
- Genus: Iberodes
- Species: I. linifolia

Binomial name
- Iberodes linifolia L.

= Iberodes linifolia =

Species of flowering plant

Iberodes linifolia (syn. Omphalodes linifolia), also known as Venus's navelwort, white-flower navelwort and petite bourrache, is an annual species of flowering plant native to the Iberian Peninsula and western France, but has naturalized elsewhere in Europe, North Africa, North America and Chile. The plant is small, growing to 30–40 cm (12–16 in) tall by 15 cm (6 in) wide, with blue-green foliage and tiny white or off-white flowers in Spring and Summer. It is distributed throughout dry open areas in full sun.

The Latin specific epithet linifolia means “with leaves like flax (Linum)”.

Under the name Omphalodes linifolia, this plant has gained the Royal Horticultural Society's Award of Garden Merit.
