= Heptanthus =

Scientific classification
- Kingdom: Plantae
- Clade: Tracheophytes
- Clade: Angiosperms
- Clade: Eudicots
- Clade: Asterids
- Order: Asterales
- Family: Asteraceae
- Subfamily: Asteroideae
- Tribe: Neurolaeneae
- Genus: Heptanthus; Griseb.

Genus of flowering plants

Heptanthus is a genus of Cuban flowering plants in the sunflower family.

Species

All the species are endemic to Cuba.

- Heptanthus brevipes Griseb.
- Heptanthus cochlearifolius Griseb.
- Heptanthus cordifolius Britton
- Heptanthus lobatus Britton
- Heptanthus ranunculoides Griseb.
- Heptanthus shaferi Britton
- Heptanthus yumuriensis Borhidi
