= Lemmatium =

Scientific classification
- Kingdom: Plantae
- Clade: Tracheophytes
- Clade: Angiosperms
- Clade: Eudicots
- Clade: Asterids
- Order: Asterales
- Family: Asteraceae
- Subfamily: Asteroideae
- Tribe: Neurolaeneae
- Subtribe: Neurolaeninae
- Genus: Lemmatium; DC.

Synonyms
- Brasilia G.M.Barroso

Genus of flowering plants

Lemmatium is a genus of flowering plants in the family Asteraceae. It includes 16 species native to South America, ranging from northeastern and central Brazil to northeastern Argentina.

The genus was first described by Augustin Pyramus de Candolle in 1836. It was later synonymized with genus Calea as Calea sect. Lemmatium. In 2023 John F. Pruski resurrected the genus.

== Species ==
16 species are accepted.

- Lemmatium arachnoideum (G.A.R.Silva & J.N.Nakaj.) Pruski
- Lemmatium brittonianum (Pruski) Pruski
- Lemmatium clematideum (Baker) Pruski
- Lemmatium diamantinense (G.A.R.Silva & J.N.Nakaj.) Pruski
- Lemmatium divergens (Sch.Bip. ex Baker) Pruski
- Lemmatium fruticosum (Gardner) Pruski
- Lemmatium grazielae (J.U.Santos) Pruski
- Lemmatium intermedium (Pruski & Urbatsch) Pruski
- Lemmatium irwinii (G.M.Barroso) Pruski
- Lemmatium lemmatioides (Sch.Bip. ex Baker) Pruski
- Lemmatium morii (H.Rob.) Pruski
- Lemmatium nitidum (Less.) Pruski
- Lemmatium oxylepis (Baker) Pruski
- Lemmatium rotundifolium (Less.) DC.
- Lemmatium sickii (G.M.Barroso) Pruski
- Lemmatium wedelioides (Baker) Pruski
