= Calea harlingii =

Conservation status
- Vulnerable (IUCN 3.1)

Scientific classification
- Kingdom: Plantae
- Clade: Tracheophytes
- Clade: Angiosperms
- Clade: Eudicots
- Clade: Asterids
- Order: Asterales
- Family: Asteraceae
- Genus: Calea
- Species: C. harlingii

Binomial name
- Calea harlingii H.Rob.

Species of flowering plant

Calea harlingii is a species of flowering plant in the aster family, Asteraceae. It is endemic to Ecuador, where it is known only from one population discovered in Loja Province in 1980. It is a shrub or subshrub that grows in low-elevation forests in the Andes. It is threatened by habitat destruction.
