= Tonalanthus =

Scientific classification
- Kingdom: Plantae
- Clade: Tracheophytes
- Clade: Angiosperms
- Clade: Eudicots
- Clade: Asterids
- Order: Asterales
- Family: Asteraceae
- Tribe: Neurolaeneae
- Subtribe: Neurolaeninae
- Genus: Tonalanthus; Brandegee
- Species: T. megacephalus

Binomial name
- Tonalanthus megacephalus (B.L.Rob. & Greenm.) Pruski

Synonyms
- Calea megacephala B.L.Rob. & Greenm. (1896) (basionym); Calea megacephala var. pachutlana B.L.Turner; Tonalanthus aurantiacus Brandegee

Genus of flowering plants

Tonalanthus is a genus of flowering plants in the family Asteraceae. It contains a single species, Tonalanthus megacephalus, a perennial native to Chiapas and Oaxaca in southern Mexico.
