= Iberodes commutata =

Scientific classification
- Kingdom: Plantae
- Clade: Tracheophytes
- Clade: Angiosperms
- Clade: Eudicots
- Clade: Asterids
- Order: Boraginales
- Family: Boraginaceae
- Genus: Iberodes
- Species: I. commutata

Binomial name
- Iberodes commutata (G.López) M.Serrano, R.Carbajal & S.Ortiz (2016)

Synonyms
- Omphalodes commutata G.López (1980)

Species of plant

Iberodes commutata is a species of flowering plant in the family Boraginaceae. It is an annual endemic to Cádiz and Málaga provinces of southern Spain. It has a conical receptacle. This delicate white to pale violet plant grows exclusively on limestone soils in the mountainous regions of southern Spain. Initially mistaken for other similar species, it was only recognized as distinct in 1980, with its current scientific name being assigned in 2016 after taxonomic reclassification.

== Description ==
Omphalodes commutata is an annual herbaceous plant that is predominantly glabrous (hairless), except for tiny white glandular bumps and a few coarse hairs along the leaf margins. The stem grows erect—often with a slight zig-zag or flexuous habit—and remains unbranched in its lower half, branching only from the middle or upper nodes. The basal leaves are spatulate to spatulate-lanceolate (broadly spoon-shaped, tapering into a stalk) with blunt tips, whereas the upper leaves are ovate to narrowly ovate (egg-shaped to narrow egg-shaped) and have bases that partially clasp the stem (subamplexicaul).

Flowers are borne in bractless racemes—unbranched clusters of flowers along a central axis—each on a spreading, almost hairless stalk (pedicel) up to 1 cm long, with a few hairs near the tip. The calyx (the collective sepals) is covered in small wart-like projections or dense, appressed hairs and ends in five lance-shaped lobes fringed with hairs (subciliate). The corolla (the collective petals) is white or pale violet and forms a tubular throat and lobes that extend well beyond the calyx. Fruiting results in two smooth, shiny nutlets—hard, one-seeded units typical of the borage family (Boraginaceae)—which are oval, hairless, and feature an entire margin that is only slightly incurved.

== Taxonomy ==
Specimens of this plant were long confused with the widespread Omphalodes pavoniana under the names Cynoglossum brassicifolium Lag. and Omphalodes amplexicaulis Lehm., later treated as Omphalodes brassicifolia (Lag.) Sweet and O. amplexicaulis auct. non Lehm. In his 1980 protologue, López González lectotypified both C. brassicifolium and O. amplexicaulis, demonstrating that material matching their descriptions actually belongs to O. pavoniana, and recognised the Andalusian limestone‐dwelling plants as a separate species, which he named Omphalodes commutata.

The lectotype of Cynoglossum brassicifolium (now synonymised under O. pavoniana) is specimen MA 94698 at the Real Jardín Botánico de Madrid, and that of Omphalodes amplexicaulis is MEL 90926 at the National Herbarium of Victoria (Melbourne). The holotype of O. commutata is MA 210998, collected 30 April 1977 near Ronda (Málaga Province) by Fuertes, Ladero, López & Navarro.
