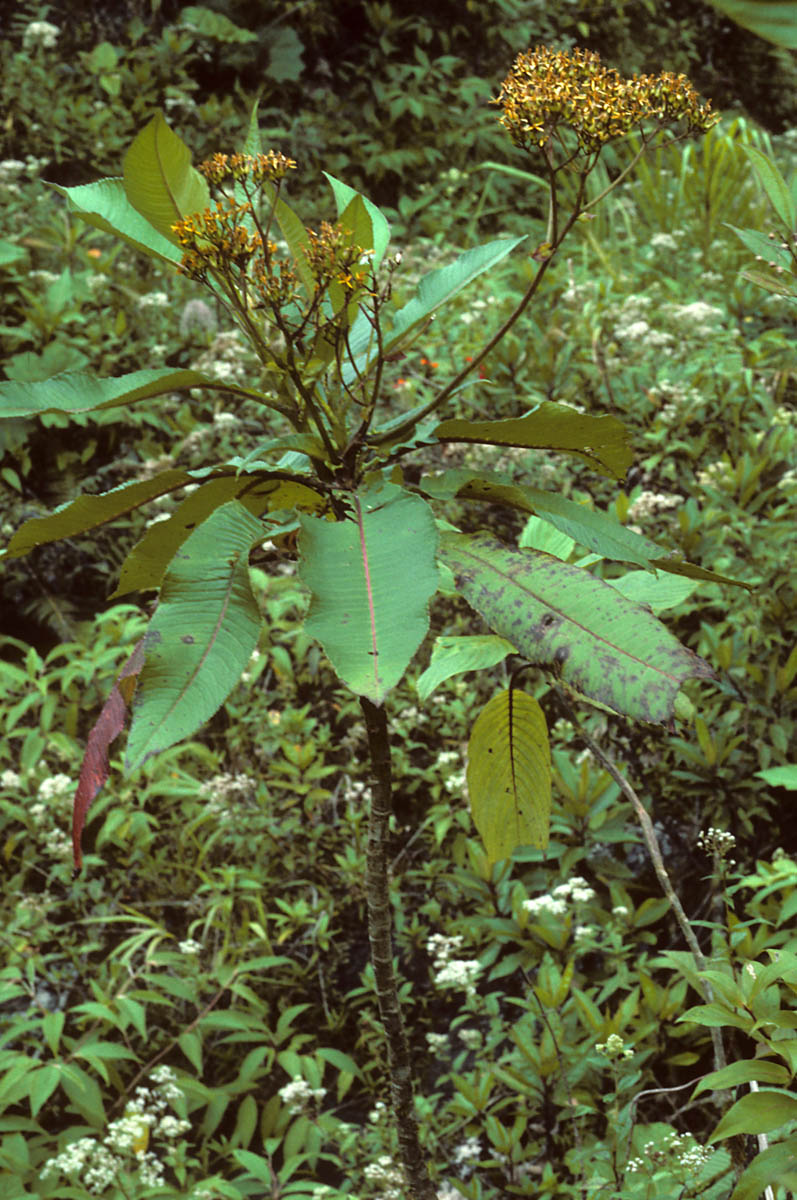
- Jessea cooperi

Scientific classification
- Kingdom: Plantae
- Clade: Embryophytes
- Clade: Tracheophytes
- Clade: Angiosperms
- Clade: Eudicots
- Clade: Asterids
- Order: Asterales
- Family: Asteraceae
- Subfamily: Asteroideae
- Tribe: Senecioneae
- Genus: Jessea; H.Rob & Cuatrec (1994)

Type species
- Jessea multivenia (Benth. ex Benth.) H.Rob & Cuatrec

= Jessea =

Genus of flowering plants in the daisy family

Jessea is a genus of Central American plants in the tribe Senecioneae within the sunflower family, closely related to Senecio.

The genus is named in honor of US botanist Jesse More Greenman (1867–1951), formerly of the Missouri Botanical Garden.

Species

- Jessea cooperi (Greenm.) H.Rob. & Cuatrec. – Panama, Costa Rica
- Jessea gunillae B.Nord. – Costa Rica
- Jessea megaphylla (Greenm.) H.Rob. & Cuatrec. – Panama, Costa Rica
- Jessea multivenia (Benth. ex Benth.) H.Rob. & Cuatrec. – Costa Rica
