= Tepuipappus =

Scientific classification
- Kingdom: Plantae
- Clade: Tracheophytes
- Clade: Angiosperms
- Clade: Eudicots
- Clade: Asterids
- Order: Asterales
- Family: Asteraceae
- Subfamily: Asteroideae
- Tribe: Heliantheae
- Subtribe: Verbesininae
- Genus: Tepuipappus; Pruski

Genus of flowering plants

Tepuipappus is a genus of flowering plant in the family Asteraceae. It includes six species endemic to southern Venezuela. The species are moderately- or simply-branched shrubs 0.3 to 3 meters tall. They are native to the Sipapo-Yutajé-Complex of tepuis, specifically occurring on Cerros Autana, Camani, Coro-Coro, Cuao, Guanay, Sipapo, Yaví, and Serrania Yutajé. Tepuis are flat-topped mountains with a flora and fauna distinct from the surrounding piedmont and lowlands.

John F. Pruski described the genus in 2023, and placed it in subtribe Verbesininae of tribe Heliantheae.

== Species ==
Six species are accepted.

- Tepuipappus camani (Maguire & K.D.Phelps) Pruski – Cerro Camani
- Tepuipappus esposi (Maguire & K.D.Phelps) Pruski – Cerro Guanay
- Tepuipappus kunhardtii (Maguire) Pruski – Cerro Sipapo, Cerro Autana, and Cerro Cuao
- Tepuipappus orbiculatus (Maguire & Aristeg.) Pruski – Cerro Yutajé and Cerro Coro Coro
- Tepuipappus phelpsiae (Lasser & Maguire) Pruski – Cerro Yaví
- Tepuipappus punctatus (Maguire & Wurdack) Pruski – Cerro Yutajé
