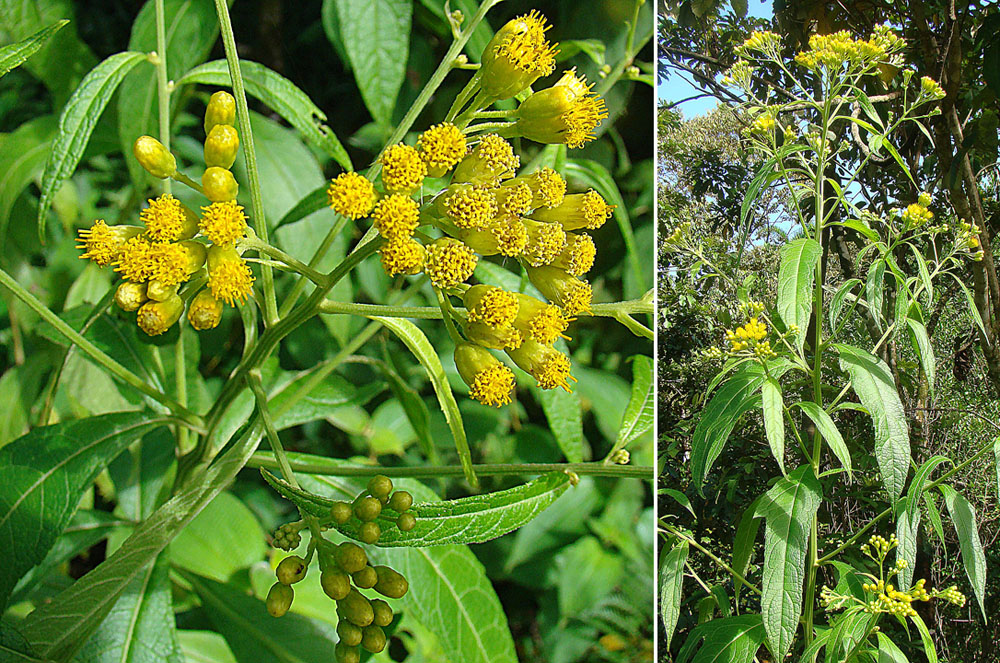
- Neurolaena lobata

Scientific classification
- Kingdom: Plantae
- Clade: Tracheophytes
- Clade: Angiosperms
- Clade: Eudicots
- Clade: Asterids
- Order: Asterales
- Family: Asteraceae
- Subfamily: Asteroideae
- Tribe: Neurolaeneae; Rydb.

= Neurolaeneae =

Tribe of plants

Neurolaeneae is a tribe of flowering plants in the subfamily Asteroideae of the family Asteraceae.

Neurolaeneae genera recognized by the Global Compositae Database as of April 2022:

- Calea L.
- Enydra Lour.
- Greenmaniella W.M.Sharp
- Heptanthus Griseb.
- Neurolaena R.Br.
- Staurochlamys Baker
- Tonalanthus Brandegee
- Unxia L.f.
