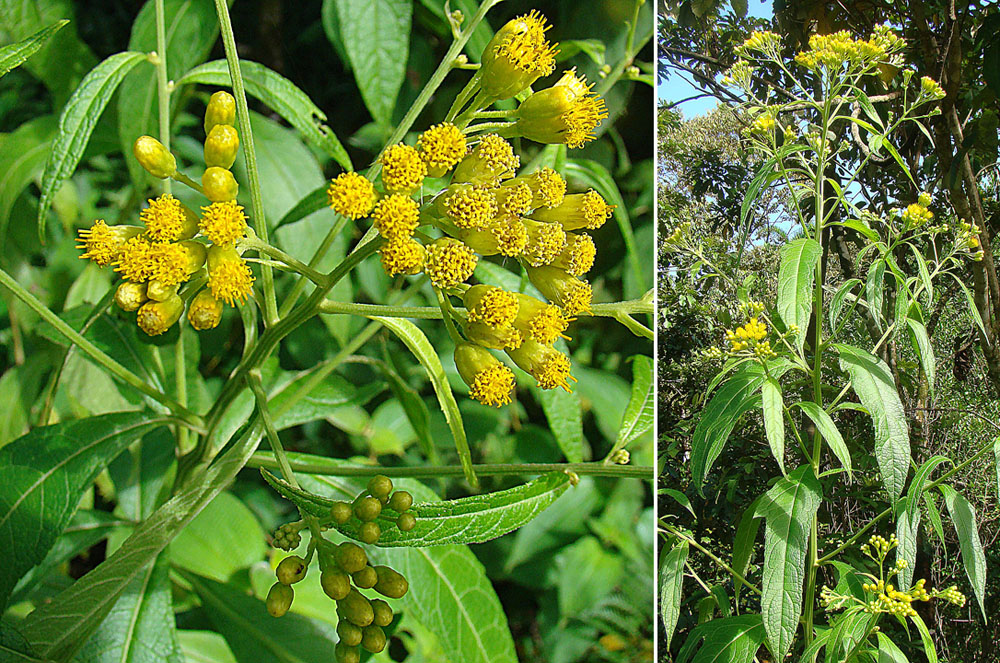

Scientific classification
- Kingdom: Plantae
- Clade: Tracheophytes
- Clade: Angiosperms
- Clade: Eudicots
- Clade: Asterids
- Order: Asterales
- Family: Asteraceae
- Genus: Neurolaena
- Species: N. lobata

Binomial name
- Neurolaena lobata (L.) R.Br. ex Cass.

Synonyms
- Calea lobata (L.) Sw.; Calea suriani Cass.; Conyza lobata L.; Conyza symphytifolia Mill.; Critonia chrysocephala (Klatt) R.M. King & H. Rob.; Eupatorium chrysocephalum Klatt; Eupatorium valverdeanum Klatt; Neurolaena fulva B.L. Turner; Neurolaena integrifolia Cass.; Neurolaena integrifolia Klatt; Neurolaena suriani (Cass.) Cass.; Pluchea symphytifolia (Mill.) Gillis

= Neurolaena lobata =

Species of flowering plant

Neurolaena lobata, commonly known as jackass bitters, is a species of perennial flowering plant in the family Asteraceae. It is found in Mexico, Central America, South America, and the West Indies.

== Distribution and habitat ==
Neurolaena lobata occurs from southern Mexico to South America, and in the West Indies. In Mexico it has been reported from the states of Campeche, Chiapas, Tabasco, Quintana Roo, and Oaxaca. It is found throughout Central America. In South America, it has been reported from Bolivia, Colombia, Ecuador, Peru, Venezuela, and the Guyanas. In the Caribbean, it has been reported from Cuba, Trinidad, and the Bahamas.

Neurolaena lobata grows in a wide variety of habitats including fields, pastures, riverbanks, roadsides, clearings, and sometimes in oak forests. It is found from sea level to 1,400 meters in elevation.

== Description ==
Neurolaena lobata is an herb which grows 1–4 meters tall. The leaves are long and slender when young, but typically have three points when mature. The flowers, which appear in clusters at the end of stems, are small and yellow.

== Use in traditional medicine ==
Neurolaena lobata is considered an important plant in folk medicine and is one of the most commonly used plants in Maya medicine. Traditional uses include: the treatment of wounds and infections; the prevention and treatment of a variety of parasitic ailments such as malaria, ringworm, and amoebiasis; treatment of inflammatory conditions; and as an insect repellent or fungicide. The leaves are known to contain flavonoids and sesquiterpene lactones.
