= Jesse More Greenman =

American botanist (1867–1951)

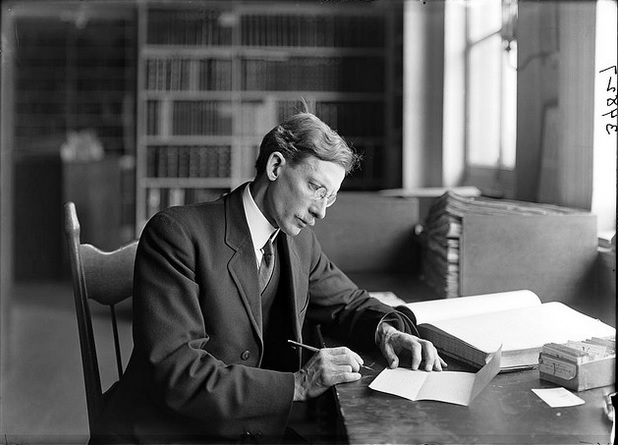
- Jesse More Greenman in 1912
- Born: December 27, 1867
- Died: January 20, 1951 (aged 83)
- Occupation: Botanist
- Years active: 1890–1943

Jesse More Greenman (December 27, 1867 – January 20, 1951) was an American botanist. He specialized in tropical flora, with emphasis on plants from Mexico and Central America. He was an authority on the genus Senecio and noted for his work at the Missouri Botanical Garden.

== Life and career ==
Greenman was born in North East, Pennsylvania. Greenman earned his baccalaureate from the University of Pennsylvania 1893, then became an instructor for a year. In 1894 he went to Harvard University studying and working in the Gray Herbarium until 1899 when he earned his master's degree. There he began a long association with Benjamin Lincoln Robinson. In 1901 he earned his Ph.D. from the University of Berlin. He then taught at Harvard from 1902–1905. In 1902 he married Anne Turner, who was born in 1875 and died in 1936. Subsequently, he worked as an assistant to the curator of the Department of Botany of the Natural History Museum in Chicago and as an Assistant Professor of Botany at the University of Chicago. He began working at the Missouri Botanical Garden as curator in 1913, remaining there until his retirement in 1943. While he was curator, the collection of flora there grew from 600,000 to about 1,500,000. He was also a professor of botany at Washington University. He suffered a severe stroke in 1945. Greenman and his wife had two sons, Jesse Greenman, Jr. and Milton T. Greenman. Milton accompanied him on his trip to Central America in 1922.

== Honors ==
Beginning in 1968, the "Jesse M. Greenman Award" is awarded by the "Missouri Botanical Garden Herbarium" in his honor for an academic paper "...judged best in vascular plant or bryophyte systematics based on a doctoral dissertation that was published during the previous year".

"The genera Greenmania P. Hieronymus and Greenmaniella W.M. Sharp were both named after him. Senecio multivenius Benth., S. cooperi Greenm., and S. megaphyllus Greenm. were reclassified in the new genus Jessea H. Robinson and J. Cuatrecases in Greenman's honor."

== Publications ==
- 1938. Studies of South American Senecios. 28 pp.
- 1929. A New Variety of Senecio aureus L. 2 pp.
- 1929. New Agaves from Southwestern United States
- 1918. A New Selaginella from Mexico
- 1917. Two exotic Compositae in North America. 4 pp.
- 1916. A New Senecio from Jamaica. 2 pp.
- 1915. The Yareta Or Vegetable Sheep of Peru
- 1914. Descriptions of North American Senecioneae
- 1912. I. New species of Cuban Senecioneae. II. Diagnoses of new species and notes on other spermatophytes, chiefly from Mexico and Central America. Fieldiana. Botany series v. 2, Nº 8 Art.
- 1911. Some Canadian Senecios. 5 pp.
- 1908. The Generic Name Goldmania
- 1908. Notes on the Genus Senecio. 69 pp.
- 1907. New Or Noteworthy Spermatophytes From Mexico, Central America, And The West Indies. Kessinger Publishing, LLC, ISBN 0-548-89531-7.
- 1906. Studies in the Genus Citharexylum. 190 pp. Field Columbian Museum Publication 117, Bot.series, Vol. 2 Nº 4.
- 1906. Two New Species from Northwestern America
- 1905. A New Krynitzkia
- 1905. Descriptions of Spermatophytes from the Southwestern United States, Mexico, and Central America. Contributions from the Gray Herbarium of Harvard Univ 31. Editor Acad. 36 pp.
- 1904. Notes on Southwestern and Mexican Plants
- 1904. Diagnoses and Synonymy of Mexican and Central American Spermatophytes. Proc. of the Am. Academy of Arts and Sci. 40. Editor Acad. 25 pp.
- 1903. New and otherwise noteworthy Angiosperms from Mexico and Central America. Contrib. from the Gray Herbarium, Harvard Univ. 25. Editor Gray Herb. of Harvard Univ. 120 pp.
- 1901. The Genus Senecio in New England. 5 pp.
- 1900. New Species and Varieties of Mexican Plants. 315 pp.
- 1899. Northwestern Plants, Chiefly from Oregon. 6 pp.
