= List of Boraginales of South Africa =

List of flowering plants in the order Boraginales recorded from South Africa

Boraginales is a valid taxonomic name at the rank of order for a group of flowering plants. It includes Boraginaceae and closely related asterid families. The Boraginales include about 125 genera, 2,700 species and its herbs, shrubs, trees and lianas (vines) have a worldwide distribution. In the 2016 APG IV system Boraginales is an order with only one family Boraginaceae, which includes the former family Codonaceae. At the time of the APG IV consensus there was insufficient support to divide this monophyletic group further.

The anthophytes are a grouping of plant taxa bearing flower-like reproductive structures. They were formerly thought to be a clade comprising plants bearing flower-like structures. The group contained the angiosperms - the extant flowering plants, such as roses and grasses - as well as the Gnetales and the extinct Bennettitales.

23,420 species of vascular plant have been recorded in South Africa, making it the sixth most species-rich country in the world and the most species-rich country on the African continent. Of these, 153 species are considered to be threatened. Nine biomes have been described in South Africa: Fynbos, Succulent Karoo, desert, Nama Karoo, grassland, savanna, Albany thickets, the Indian Ocean coastal belt, and forests.

The 2018 South African National Biodiversity Institute's National Biodiversity Assessment plant checklist lists 35,130 taxa in the phyla Anthocerotophyta (hornworts (6)), Anthophyta (flowering plants (33534)), Bryophyta (mosses (685)), Cycadophyta (cycads (42)), Lycopodiophyta (Lycophytes(45)), Marchantiophyta (liverworts (376)), Pinophyta (conifers (33)), and Pteridophyta (cryptogams (408)).

One family is represented in the literature. Listed taxa include species, subspecies, varieties, and forms as recorded, some of which have subsequently been allocated to other taxa as synonyms, in which cases the accepted taxon is appended to the listing. Multiple entries under alternative names reflect taxonomic revision over time.

== Boraginaceae ==
Family: Boraginaceae

=== Afrotysonia ===
Genus Afrotysonia:

- Afrotysonia africana (Bolus) Rauschert, endemic
- Afrotysonia glochidiata (R.R.Mill) R.R.Mill, indigenous

=== Amsinckia ===
Genus Amsinckia:

- Amsinckia calycina (Moris) Chater, not indigenous
- Amsinckia menziesii (Lehm.) A.Nelson & J.F.Macbr. not indigenous
- Amsinckia retrorsa Suksd. not indigenous

=== Anchusa ===
Genus Anchusa:

- Anchusa azurea Mill. not indigenous
- Anchusa capensis Thunb. indigenous
- Anchusa riparia A.DC. indigenous

=== Buglossoides ===
Genus Buglossoides:

- Buglossoides arvensis (L.) I.M.Johnst. not indigenous

=== Codon ===
Genus Codon:

- Codon royenii L. indigenous
- Codon schenckii Schinz, indigenous

=== Coldenia ===
Genus Coldenia:

- Coldenia procumbens L. indigenous

=== Cordia ===
Genus Cordia:

- Cordia africana Lam. indigenous
- Cordia caffra Sond. indigenous
- Cordia grandicalyx Oberm. indigenous
- Cordia monoica Roxb. indigenous
- Cordia ovalis R.Br. ex A.DC. indigenous
- Cordia quercifolia Klotzsch, indigenous
- Cordia sinensis Lam. indigenous

=== Cynoglossum ===
Genus Cynoglossum:

- Cynoglossum alticola Hilliard & B.L.Burtt, indigenous
- Cynoglossum amabile Stapf & J.R.Drumm. not indigenous
- Cynoglossum austroafricanum Hilliard & B.L.Burtt, indigenous
- Cynoglossum geometricum Baker & C.H.Wright, indigenous
- Cynoglossum hispidum Thunb. indigenous
- Cynoglossum lanceolatum Forssk. indigenous
- Cynoglossum obtusicalyx Retief & A.E.van Wyk, endemic
- Cynoglossum spelaeum Hilliard & B.L.Burtt, indigenous

=== Echiostachys ===
Genus Echiostachys:

- Echiostachys ecklonianus (H.Buek) Levyns, endemic
- Echiostachys incanus (Thunb.) Levyns, endemic
- Echiostachys spicatus (Burm.f.) Levyns, endemic

=== Echium ===
Genus Echium:

- Echium candicans L.f. not indigenous; cultivated, invasive
- Echium plantagineum L. not indigenous, invasive
- Echium simplex DC. not indigenous
- Echium vulgare L. not indigenous, invasive

=== Ehretia ===
Genus Ehretia:

- Ehretia alba Retief & A.E.van Wyk, indigenous
- Ehretia amoena Klotzsch, indigenous
- Ehretia obtusifolia Hochst. ex A.DC. indigenous
- Ehretia rigida (Thunb.) Druce, indigenous
  - Ehretia rigida (Thunb.) Druce subsp. nervifolia Retief & A.E.van Wyk, indigenous
  - Ehretia rigida (Thunb.) Druce subsp. rigida, endemic
  - Ehretia rigida (Thunb.) Druce subsp. silvatica Retief & A.E.van Wyk, endemic

=== Heliotropium ===
Genus Heliotropium:

- Heliotropium amplexicaule Vahl, not indigenous, invasive
- Heliotropium burmanni Roem. & Schult. accepted as Heliotropium tubulosum E.Mey. ex A.DC. present
- Heliotropium capense Lehm. accepted as Heliotropium supinum L. present
- Heliotropium ciliatum Kaplan, indigenous
- Heliotropium curassavicum L. not indigenous
- Heliotropium europaeum L. not indigenous, invasive
- Heliotropium giessii Friedr.-Holzh. indigenous
- Heliotropium hereroense Schinz, indigenous
- Heliotropium indicum L. not indigenous
- Heliotropium lineare (A.DC.) Gurke, indigenous
- Heliotropium nelsonii C.H.Wright, indigenous
- Heliotropium ovalifolium Forssk. indigenous
- Heliotropium steudneri Vatke, indigenous
- Heliotropium strigosum Willd. indigenous
- Heliotropium supinum L. not indigenous
- Heliotropium tubulosum E.Mey. ex A.DC. indigenous
- Heliotropium zeylanicum (Burm.f.) Lam. indigenous

=== Lappula ===
Genus Lappula:

- Lappula capensis (A.DC.) Gurke, indigenous
- Lappula cynoglossoides (Lam.) Gurke, accepted as Lappula capensis (A.DC.) Gurke, present
- Lappula eckloniana Brand, accepted as Lappula capensis (A.DC.) Gurke, present
- Lappula heteracantha Ledeb. not indigenous
  - Lappula squarrosa (L.) Dumort. subsp. heteracantha (Ledeb.) Chater, accepted as Lappula heteracantha Ledeb. not indigenous

=== Lithospermum ===
Genus Lithospermum:

- Lithospermum affine A.DC. endemic
- Lithospermum afromontanum Weim. indigenous
- Lithospermum cinereum A.DC. indigenous
- Lithospermum diversifolium A.DC. indigenous
- Lithospermum flexuosum Lehm. indigenous
- Lithospermum hirsutum E.Mey. ex A.DC. endemic
- Lithospermum inornatum A.DC. accepted as Lithospermum cinereum A.DC. present
- Lithospermum papillosum Thunb. indigenous
- Lithospermum scabrum Thunb. endemic

=== Lobostemon ===
Genus Lobostemon:

- Lobostemon argenteus (P.J.Bergius) H.Buek, endemic
- Lobostemon belliformis M.H.Buys, endemic
- Lobostemon bolusii Levyns, accepted as Lobostemon capitatus (L.) H.Buek, present
- Lobostemon capitatus (L.) H.Buek, endemic
- Lobostemon collinus Schltr. ex C.H.Wright, endemic
- Lobostemon curvifolius H.Buek, endemic
- Lobostemon daltonii M.H.Buys, endemic
- Lobostemon decorus Levyns, endemic
- Lobostemon echioides Lehm. endemic
- Lobostemon fruticosus (L.) H.Buek, endemic
- Lobostemon glaber (Vahl) H.Buek, endemic
- Lobostemon glaucophyllus (Jacq.) H.Buek, endemic
- Lobostemon gracilis Levyns, endemic
- Lobostemon grandiflorus (Andrews) Levyns, accepted as Lobostemon regulareflorus (Ker Gawl.) M.H.Buys, present
- Lobostemon hispidus DC. & A.DC. accepted as Lobostemon glaber (Vahl) H.Buek, present
- Lobostemon horridus Levyns, endemic
- Lobostemon hottentoticus Levyns, endemic
- Lobostemon inconspicuus Levyns, accepted as Lobostemon capitatus (L.) H.Buek, present
- Lobostemon laevigatus (L.) H.Buek, endemic
- Lobostemon lucidus (Lehm.) H.Buek, endemic
- Lobostemon marlothii Levyns, endemic
- Lobostemon montanus H.Buek, endemic
- Lobostemon muirii Levyns, endemic
- Lobostemon oederiaefolius A.DC. endemic
- Lobostemon paniculatus (Thunb.) H.Buek, endemic
- Lobostemon paniculiformis A.DC. endemic
- Lobostemon pearsonii Levyns, accepted as Lobostemon glaucophyllus (Jacq.) H.Buek, endemic
- Lobostemon regulareflorus (Ker Gawl.) M.H.Buys, endemic
- Lobostemon sanguineus Schltr. endemic
- Lobostemon stachydeus A.DC. indigenous
- Lobostemon strigosus (Lehm.) H.Buek, endemic
- Lobostemon trichotomus (Thunb.) DC. endemic
- Lobostemon trigonus (Thunb.) H.Buek, endemic

=== Myosotis ===
Genus Myosotis:

- Myosotis afropalustris C.H.Wright, indigenous
- Myosotis arvensis (L.) Hill, not indigenous, invasive
- Myosotis discolor Pers. not indigenous
- Myosotis galpinii C.H.Wright, indigenous
- Myosotis graminifolia A.DC. indigenous
- Myosotis semiamplexicaulis A.DC. indigenous
- Myosotis stricta Link ex Roem. & Schult. not indigenous, invasive
- Myosotis sylvatica Hoffm. not indigenous

=== Phacelia ===
Genus Phacelia:

- Phacelia artemisioides Griseb. not indigenous

=== Rochelia ===
Genus Rochelia:

- Rochelia disperma (L.f.) K.Koch, not indigenous

=== Symphytum ===
Genus Symphytum:

- Symphytum bulbosum K.F.Schimp. not indigenous

=== Trichodesma ===
Genus Trichodesma:

- Trichodesma africanum (L.) Lehm. indigenous
- Trichodesma angustifolium Harv. indigenous
  - Trichodesma angustifolium Harv. subsp. angustifolium, indigenous
- Trichodesma physaloides (Fenzl) A.DC. indigenous
- Trichodesma zeylanicum (Burm.f.) R.Br. indigenous

=== Wellstedia ===
Genus Wellstedia:

- Wellstedia dinteri Pilg. indigenous
  - Wellstedia dinteri Pilg. subsp. dinteri, indigenous
  - Wellstedia dinteri Pilg. var. dinteri, accepted as Wellstedia dinteri Pilg. subsp. dinteri, present
  - Wellstedia dinteri Pilg. var. gracilior Hunt, accepted as Wellstedia dinteri Pilg. subsp. gracilior (D.R.Hunt) Retief & A.E.van Wyk

=== Wigandia ===
Genus Wigandia:

- Wigandia caracasana Kunth, accepted as Wigandia urens (Ruiz & Pav.) Kunth var. caracasana (Kunth) Gibson, not indigenous, invasive
- Wigandia urens (Ruiz & Pav.) Kunth var. caracasana (Kunth) Gibson, not indigenous, invasive
