= Beaut =

Beaut or Beauts may refer to:

- Buffalo Beauts, a professional women's ice hockey team based in Amherst, New York, United States
- Jigsaw (Marvel Comics), a fictional character known as "the Beaut" before his disfigurement
- Norman "Beaut" McGregor, protagonist of the 1917 novel Marching Men by Sherwood Anderson
- Joseph Humphreys (1872–1936), American boxing official and announcer nicknamed "Joe the Beaut"

== See also ==
- Lobostemon belliformis, a plant species also known as the beaut healthbush
- Beauty
- Beaud
