= Hoplestigma pierreanum =

Conservation status
- Critically Endangered (IUCN 2.3)

Scientific classification
- Kingdom: Plantae
- Clade: Tracheophytes
- Clade: Angiosperms
- Clade: Eudicots
- Clade: Asterids
- Order: Boraginales
- Family: Hoplestigmataceae
- Genus: Hoplestigma
- Species: H. pierreanum

Binomial name
- Hoplestigma pierreanum Gilg

Species of flowering plant

Hoplestigma pierreanum is a species of plant in the family Hoplestigmataceae. It has also been placed in the family Boraginaceae s.l. It is endemic to Cameroon. Its natural habitat is subtropical or tropical dry forests. It is threatened by habitat loss.
