= Wellstedia socotrana =

Conservation status
- Vulnerable (IUCN 3.1)

Scientific classification
- Kingdom: Plantae
- Clade: Tracheophytes
- Clade: Angiosperms
- Clade: Eudicots
- Clade: Asterids
- Order: Boraginales
- Family: Wellstediaceae
- Genus: Wellstedia
- Species: W. socotrana

Binomial name
- Wellstedia socotrana Balf.f. (1884)

Species of plant

Wellstedia socotrana is a species of flowering plant in the family Wellstediaceae. It is a subshrub native to northeastern Somalia and southern Socotra.
