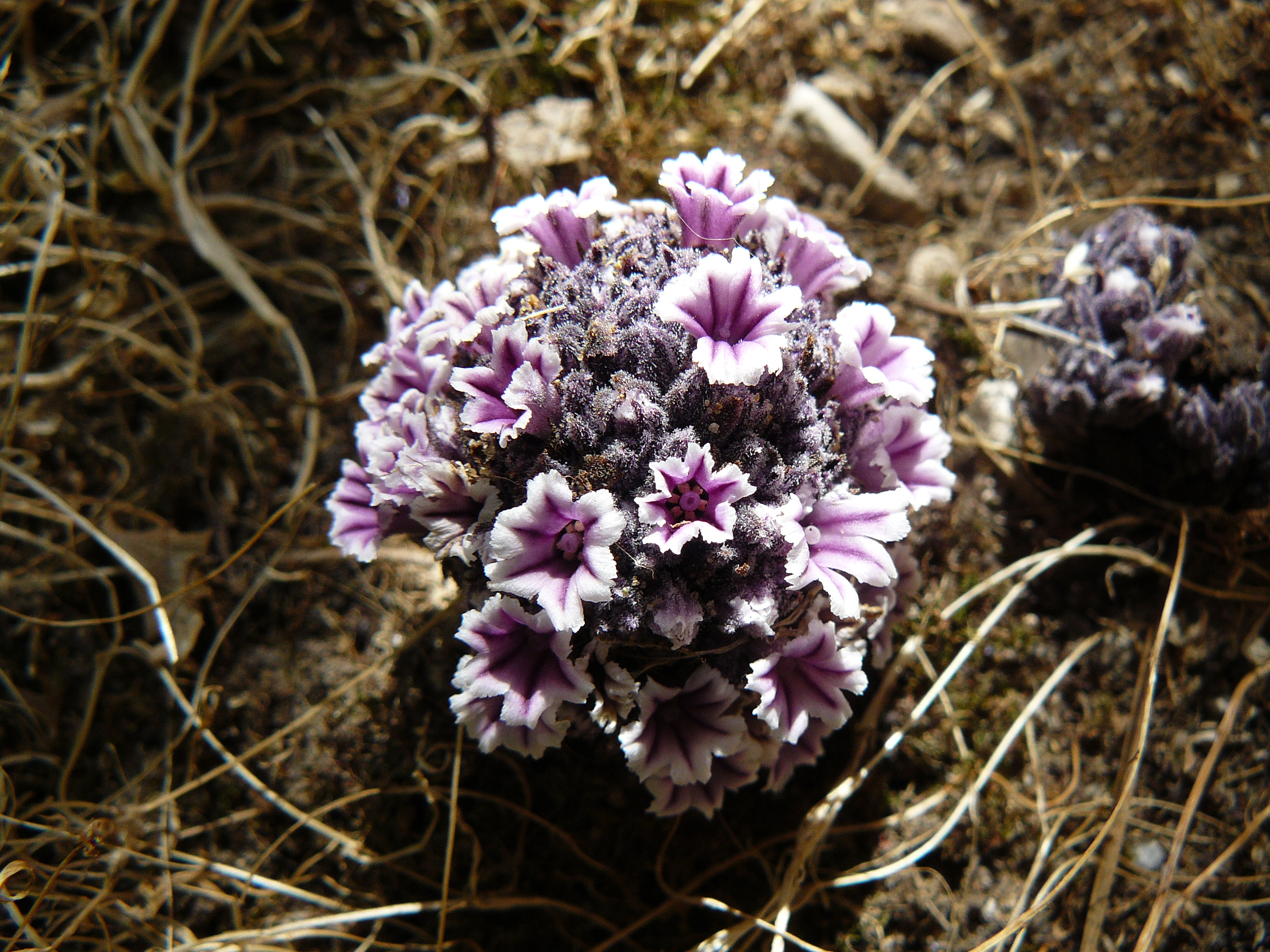

Conservation status
- Vulnerable (NatureServe)

Scientific classification
- Kingdom: Plantae
- Clade: Tracheophytes
- Clade: Angiosperms
- Clade: Eudicots
- Clade: Asterids
- Order: Boraginales
- Family: Lennoaceae
- Genus: Pholisma
- Species: P. arenarium

Binomial name
- Pholisma arenarium Nutt. ex Hook.

= Pholisma arenarium =

Species of flowering plant

Pholisma arenarium is a species of flowering plant in the family Lennoaceae. It is known by several common names, including desert Christmas tree, scaly-stemmed sand plant, and purple sand food. As the name implies, the loaf-like part of the root is edible. It is native to northwestern Mexico, Arizona and southern California, where it grows in many habitat types, including desert, chaparral, and sandy coastal dunes. It is a fleshy perennial herb taking a compact cylindrical or ovate shape up to 20 or 30 centimeters tall above ground, often with part of the stem below the sandy surface. It is a parasitic plant growing on the roots or of various shrubs such as burrobush, Yerba Santa, California croton, rabbitbrush, and ragweeds. As a heterotroph which derives its nutrients from other plants, it lacks chlorophyll and is brownish-gray or whitish in color. There are hairy, glandular, pointed leaves along the surface of the plant. Flowers emerge between them, each roughly one centimeter wide, the rounded corolla lavender to deep or bright purple with a white margin.
