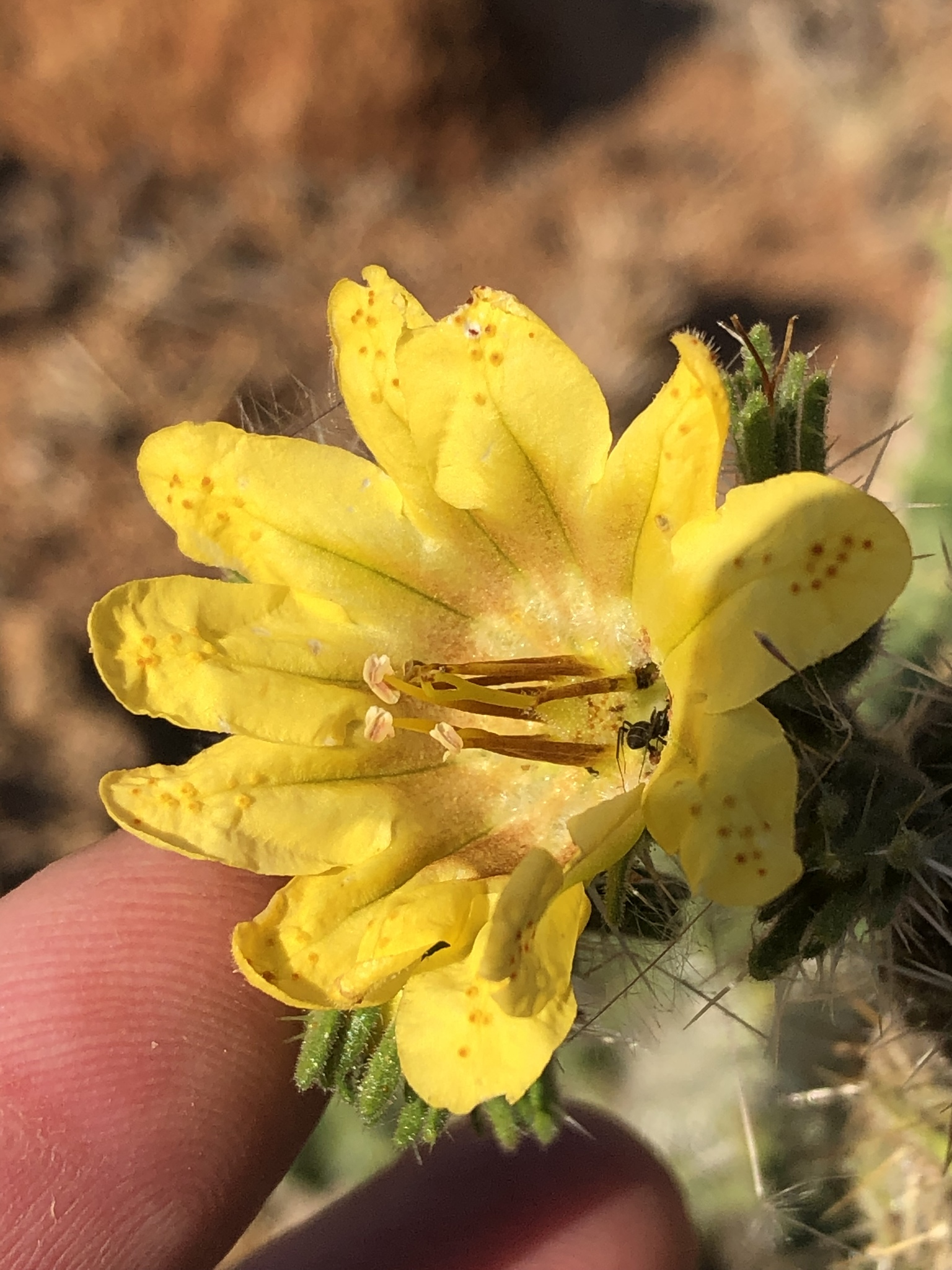

Conservation status
- Least Concern (SANBI Red List)

Scientific classification
- Kingdom: Plantae
- Clade: Tracheophytes
- Clade: Angiosperms
- Clade: Eudicots
- Clade: Asterids
- Order: Boraginales
- Family: Codonaceae
- Genus: Codon
- Species: C. schenckii

Binomial name
- Codon schenckii Schinz (1888)

Synonyms
- Codon luteum Marloth & Engl. (1888)

= Codon schenckii =

Flowering plant endemic to Namibia

Codon schenckii is a species of flowering plant in the genus Codon. It is native to Namibia and the Northern Cape Province of South Africa. It is also known by the name yellow nectarcup.

== Description ==
Codon schenckii is similar in appearance to Codon royenii but with smaller flowers; its corolla are slightly campanulate and 15-18 mm long; they are pale to bright yellow, with reddish dots near the apex of the lobes. It is rain dependent.

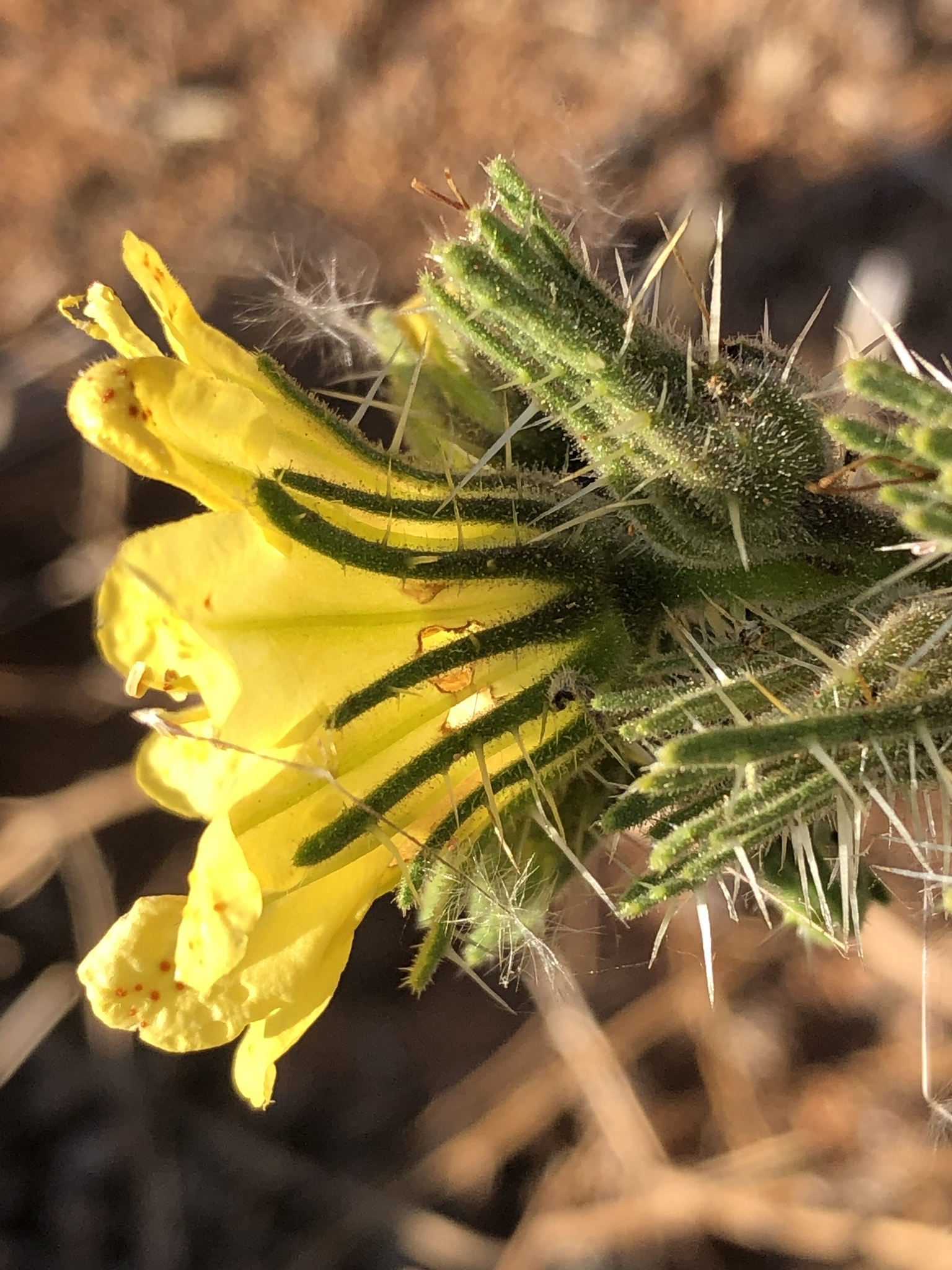

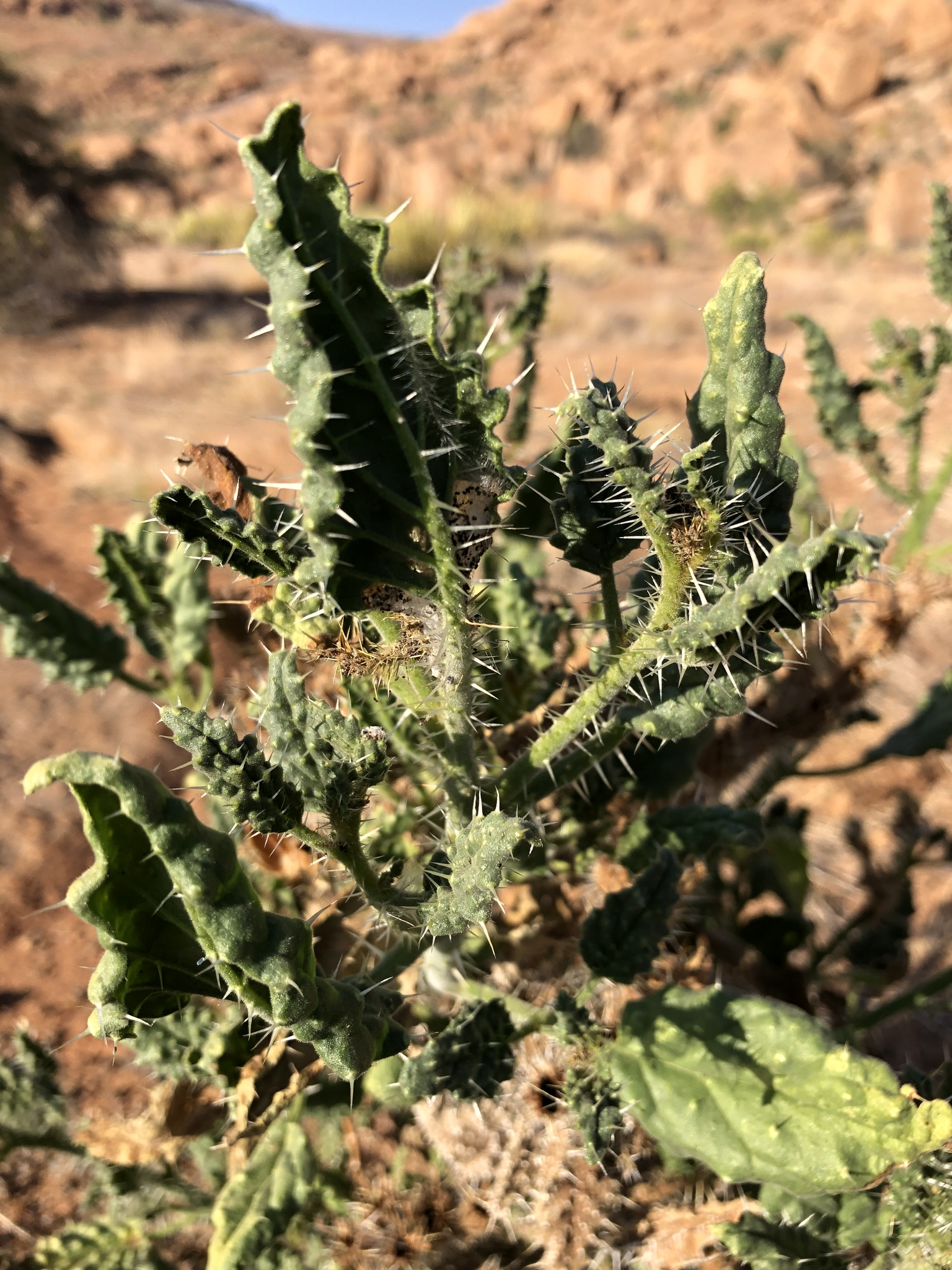

== Distribution ==
Codon schenckii is found in western Namibia and down to the Richtersveld of South Africa.

== Habitat ==
Codon schenckii is found on sandy watercourses and rocky slopes.

== Ecology ==
Its flowers are visited by Eoanthidium turnericum.

== Conservation status ==
Codon schenckii is classified as Least Concern, as it is widespread and not in danger of extinction. It is widespread and common across the desert areas of Namibia, but rare and restricted to the Richtersveld in South Africa.
