= Lobostemon cinereus =

Scientific classification
- Kingdom: Plantae
- Clade: Tracheophytes
- Clade: Angiosperms
- Clade: Eudicots
- Clade: Asterids
- Order: Boraginales
- Family: Boraginaceae
- Genus: Lobostemon
- Species: L. cinereus

Binomial name
- Lobostemon cinereus DC. & A.DC.

Synonyms
- Echium cinereum (DC.) I.M.Johnst.

Species of plant

Lobostemon cinereus, the ash healthbush, is a species belonging to the forget-me-not family. It is endemic to the Cape Provinces of South Africa.

== Description ==
This species is similar in appearance to Lobostemon trichotomus. It is a shrublet that grows up to 30–100 cm (0.98–3.28 ft) in height. The elongated lance shaped leaves are stalkless leaves are somewhat leathery and are covered in ash-coloured leaves on both the upper and lower surfaces. These hairs are the basis of its species name (with cinis meaning ashes in Latin). The leaves also have bulbous-based hairs on lower surface.

Flowers are present between August and November. They are white, or sometimes pale pink, and are borne in cymes. They may be hairy or hairless on the outer surface. The staminal scales are slightly triangular with staminal scales.

== Distribution and habitat ==
It is found from Port Nolloth to Heerenlogement and the Cedarberg, where it grows on sandy flats and slopes.
