= Lobostemon collinus =

Scientific classification
- Kingdom: Plantae
- Clade: Tracheophytes
- Clade: Angiosperms
- Clade: Eudicots
- Clade: Asterids
- Order: Boraginales
- Family: Boraginaceae
- Genus: Lobostemon
- Species: L. collinus

Binomial name
- Lobostemon collinus Schltr. ex C.H.Wright

Synonyms
- Echium schlechteri I.M.Johnst.; Lobostemon collinus Schltr.

Species of Boraginaceae endemic to fynbos in South Africa

Lobostemon collinus, the pyjamabush or iron healthbush, is a species belonging to the forget me not family. It is known only from the fynbos biome of the Western Cape of South Africa.

== Description ==
This shrublet grows 20–40 cm (0.66–1.31 ft) tall. The stalkless leaves are leathery and oblong. They may or may not be hairy. Flowers are present between September and August. The pale blue flowers are borne in cymes and are hairy on the outside. The staminal scales are ridge-like and lack lobes. The style is hairy.

== Distribution and habitat ==
This species is found in five locations between Elim and Bredasdorp. It is only known from Elim Ferricrete Fynbos. It grows on stony coastal flats.

== Conservation ==
This species is classed as endangered by the South African National Biodiversity Institute (SANBI). Its habitat has historically been severely ploughed for the cultivation of wheat and proteas. This is ongoing in the Bredasdorp region. It is also threatened by invasive alien plants. The only subpopulation in Elim occurs on a road verge and is threatened by road expansion.
