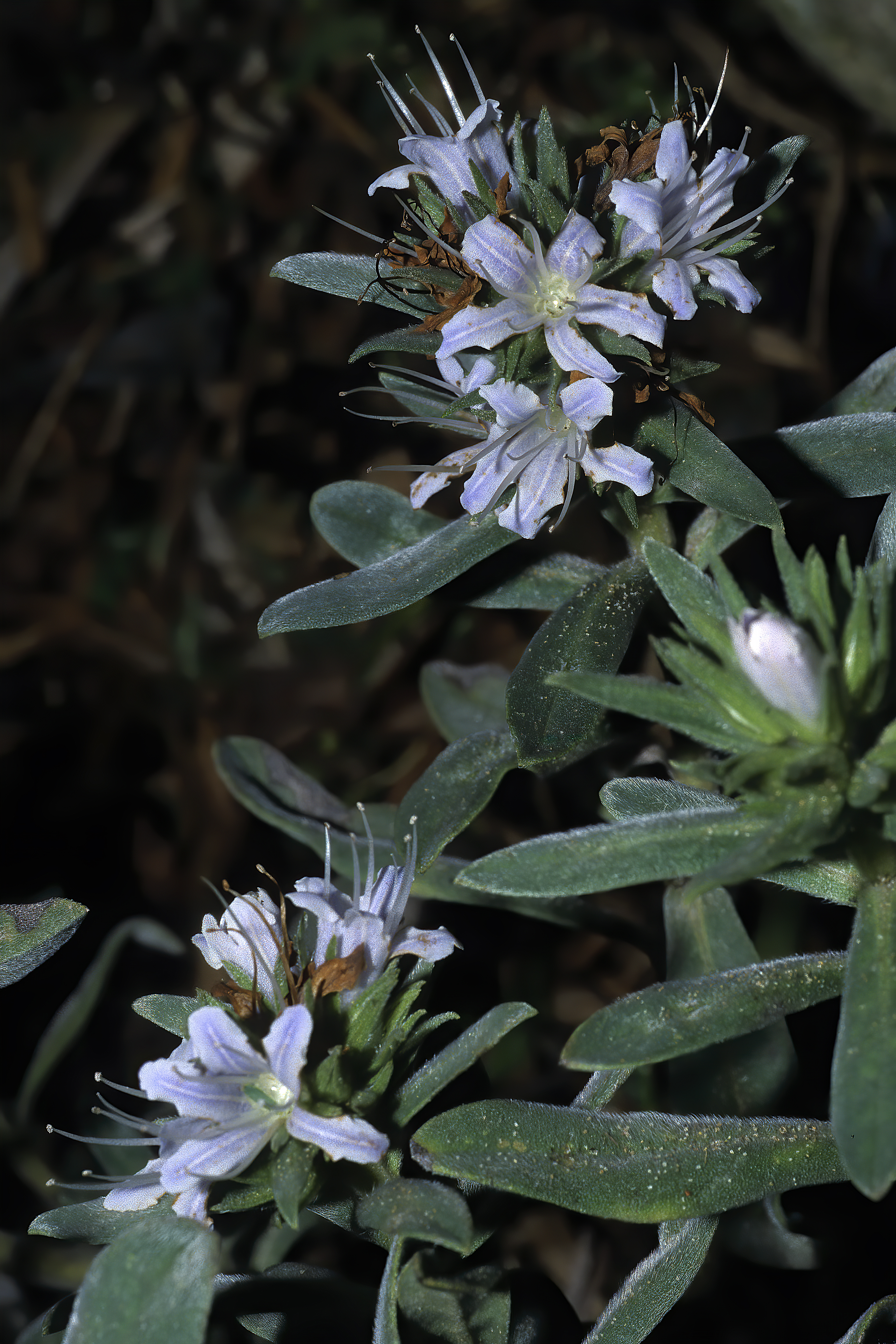
- Lobostemon montanus from the Kirstenbosch National Botanical Garden, Cape Town, South Africa

Scientific classification
- Kingdom: Plantae
- Clade: Tracheophytes
- Clade: Angiosperms
- Clade: Eudicots
- Clade: Asterids
- Order: Boraginales
- Family: Boraginaceae
- Genus: Lobostemon
- Species: L. montanus

Binomial name
- Lobostemon montanus (DC.) H.Buek

Synonyms
- Echium montanum DC.; Echium sprengelianum (H.Buek) DC.; Lobostemon sprengelianus H.Buek

= Lobostemon montanus =

Boraginaceae species endemic to the Cape Floristic Region of South Africa

Lobostemon montanus, the turquoise bush bugloss, mountain lobostemon or agtdaegeneesbos, is a South African species belonging to the forget-me-not family.

== Description ==
=== Growth form ===
This branching shrub typically grows 0.8–1.2 m (2.6–3.9 ft) tall, although it may reach a height of 1.5 m (4.9 ft). It spreads up to 2 m (6.6 ft) wide. The woody branches are hairless, while the terminal, upward growing herbaceous branches are hairy.

=== Leaves ===
The stalkless hairy leaves are a silvery-green colour and are oval or oblong, widening towards the tip. The leaves cover the entire plant to ground level, forming rosettes at the ends of branches.

=== Flowers ===
Flowers are borne in large inflorescences at the top of the shrub between June and September. The individual flowers are loosely arranged to form a globose (spherical) unit, spreading slightly in fruiting stage. The flowers are short and tubular, bell- or funnel-shaped. They are blue or turquoise, with stamens that stick out of the top, past the petals. The stamens are usually purple, contrasting with the pale petals. The staminal scales occur well below the throat of the corolla tube (about 1 mm (0.039 in) above the base) and are reduced to rounded ridges and lack lateral lobes. The area between scales is also hairy.

== Distribution and habitat ==
This species is endemic to the Western Cape of South Africa, where it occurs in the Cape Floristic Region. It is found in mountainous areas between the Cape Peninsula and Onrus. It is currently most abundant in localities around False Bay. Populations are also known from Hermanus, the Atlantic seaboard of the Cape Peninsula, and from the lower northern slopes of Table Mountain, where the type specimen for this species was collected. It is fairly common on mountains, rocky outcrops and along the coast, where it occurs on sandstone soils. It is also frequently found in disturbed areas, for example, along roads.

== Ecology ==
The blue flowers attract bees and also birds, particularly the orange-breasted sunbird, the lesser double-collared sunbird, and the cape sugarbird. Baboons have also been observed to eat the flowers.

While individuals may resprout from the lower stems or the trunk after fire if not too badly burnt, this species mainly recolonises through seeds. They reseed themselves most prolifically after a fire.

== Cultivation ==
Lobostemon montanus is relatively easy to grow in most gardens. It requires well-drained soils in a sunny position and does particularly well in rockeries and on embankments. It is a suitable plant for a coastal garden as the thick, hairy leaves protect it from the salt-laden wind. These thick, leathery leaves also make it highly drought resistant. It is, however, not cold tolerant and will need to be protected from frost.

It can be grown from cuttings or from seeds. Cuttings from the tips of branches or thin side shoots root taken in spring or autumn well provided that they are not kept too wet. They should root after about two or three months if placed in a sandy bed that receives the cooler morning sun and are sprayed occasionally, whenever they look stressed. Plants grow from fresh seeds collected from old flower heads that have turned a brownish-grey. Treat the seeds with hot water and thereafter with smoke to simulate fire in order to aid germination. Seeds should be sown in late summer or in spring.

== Conservation ==
Although this species has a narrow distribution, it is a common species within its range. The South African National Biodiversity Institute (SANBI) has classified this species as least concern.
