= Lobostemon echioides =

Scientific classification
- Kingdom: Plantae
- Clade: Tracheophytes
- Clade: Angiosperms
- Clade: Eudicots
- Clade: Asterids
- Order: Boraginales
- Family: Boraginaceae
- Genus: Lobostemon
- Species: L. echioides

Binomial name
- Lobostemon echioides Lehm.

Synonyms
- Echium buekii I.M.Johnst.; Echium diversifolium (H.Buek) I.M.Johnst.; Echium echioides (Lehm.) I.M.Johnst.; Echium fastigiatum (H.Buek) I.M.Johnst.; Echium microphyllum (H.Buek) I.M.Johnst.; Echium nitidum (Bolus) I.M.Johnst.; Echium pubiflorum (C.H.Wright) I.M.Johnst.; Echium trichotomum Thunb.; Echium virgatum (H.Buek) I.M.Johnst.; Lobostemon diversifolius H.Buek; Lobostemon elongatus H.Buek; Lobostemon fastigiatus H.Buek; Lobostemon lehmannianus H.Buek; Lobostemon microphyllus H.Buek; Lobostemon nitidus Bolus; Lobostemon nitidus Bolus ex C.H.Wright; Lobostemon pubiflorus C.H.Wright; Lobostemon virgatus H.Buek

Species of plant from South Africa

Lobostemon echioides is a species of flowering plant in the family Boraginaceae. Commonly referred to as the common healthbush, it is the mostly widely distributed species in its genus. It is endemic to the Cape Provinces of South Africa, where it is found growing between Namaqualand and the Karoo and the Eastern Cape.

== Description ==
This resprouting shrub or undershrub grows about 20–80 cm (7.9–31.5 in) tall. The stalkless leaves are narrow and hairy and are often soft and silvery.

Flowers are mainly present from August to October but have been found year round. Plants flowering from February to May seem to be confined to the southern parts of the distribution, where small amounts of rain are available throughout the year. The flowers are small (petals are 17–30 mm (0.67–1.18 in) long) and violet-blue. They are hairy on the outside and are borne in may flowered cymes. The buds are arranged in two distinct rows, spreading greatly in the fruiting stage. The stamens protrude beyond the petals. The staminal scales are triangular with lateral lobes. The staminal scales inserted at the throat of the corolla tube, about 2–3 mm (0.079–0.118 in) above the base of the corolla tube

== Distribution and habitat ==
This is the most widely distributed Lobostemon species, occurring across the range of the genus. It grows from Namaqualand and the Karoo through to the Eastern Cape. It prefers drier habitats and is absent from wetter areas. It grows on stony slopes and flats in mostly sandstone derived soils.

== Ecology ==
As with other Lobostemon species, the common healthbush is able to resprout after a fire.
