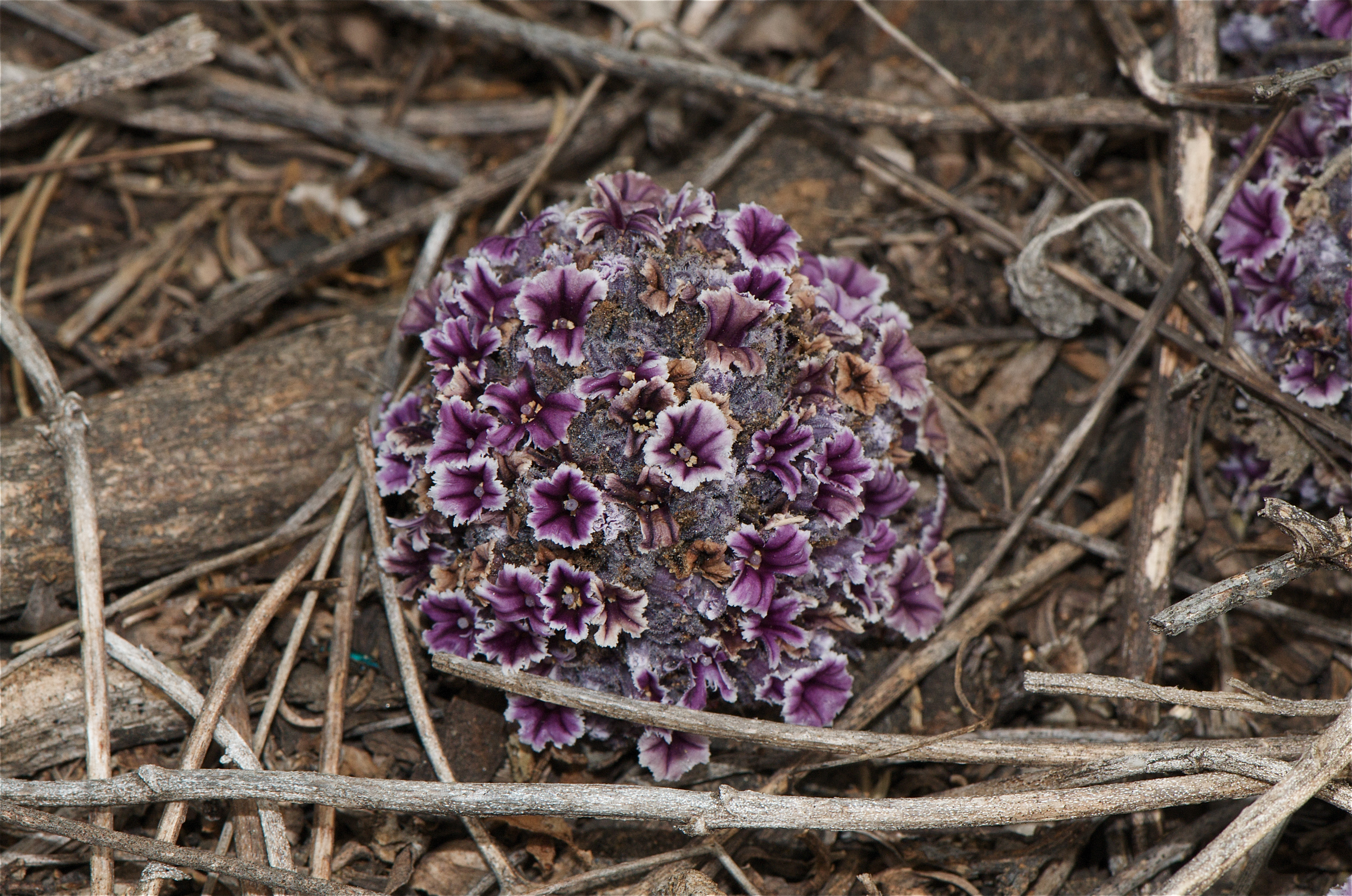
- Pholisma arenarium

Scientific classification
- Kingdom: Plantae
- Clade: Tracheophytes
- Clade: Angiosperms
- Clade: Eudicots
- Clade: Asterids
- Order: Boraginales
- Family: Lennoaceae
- Genus: Pholisma; Nutt. ex Hook. (1844)

Species
- Pholisma arenarium Nutt.; Pholisma culiacana (Dressler & Kuijt) Yatsk.; Pholisma sonorae (Torr.) Yatsk.

Synonyms
- Ammobroma Torr. (1867)

= Pholisma =

Genus of flowering plants

The genus Pholisma consists of three species of desert-dwelling, primarily subterranean plants. Pholisma belongs to the family Lennoaceae. (It may also be placed in a broadly circumscribed family Boraginaceae s.l.)

Most notable of the genus is Pholisma sonorae, native to the southwestern United States and Mexico. The species is without chlorophyll and lives as a parasite on the roots of a number of desert species. Other species include Pholisma arenarium, the "desert Christmas tree", and Pholisma culiacana.
