= Lobostemon decorus =

Scientific classification
- Kingdom: Plantae
- Clade: Tracheophytes
- Clade: Angiosperms
- Clade: Eudicots
- Clade: Asterids
- Order: Boraginales
- Family: Boraginaceae
- Genus: Lobostemon
- Species: L. decorus

Binomial name
- Lobostemon decorus Levyns

Boraginaceae species endemic to South Africa

Lobostemon decorus, the Rooiberg healthbush, is a species belonging to the forget-me-not family. It is endemic to the Western Cape of South Africa.

== Description ==
This shrublet grows 50–100 cm (1.6–3.3 ft) tall. The stalkless leaves are hairy near the tips. They are narrow and oblong in shape.

Funnel-shaped flowers are present between August and October. They are blue with hairs on the outside and are borne in cymes. The flower buds are loosely arranged to form a globose unit, spreading slightly as they mature. There at least three flowers per cymule. Each flower is 17–30 mm (0.67–1.18 in) long, with the anterior petal lobes being larger than the rest. The anthers are borne on short filaments and the stamens only rarely protrude past the petals. The staminal scales are ridge-like and do not have lateral lobes. They occur well below the throat of the corolla tube, being inserted about 4.5–5 mm (0.18–0.20 in) above the base.

This species has been confused with Lobostemon marlothii. There are, however a few features that can be used to distinguish between the two. Lobostemon decorus has a longer calyx, fewer flowers per inflorescence, pale blue flowers (compared to deep blue with a pinkish base in L. marlothii) and narrowly oblong leaves (compared to the wider and often more lance-like leaves in L. marlothii).

== Distribution and habitat ==
This species is found growing at Touwsberg and Rooiberg, where it grows on sandstone slopes. It usually occurs at an altitude greater than 700 m (2,300 ft).
