= Hoplestigma =

Scientific classification
- Kingdom: Plantae
- Clade: Tracheophytes
- Clade: Angiosperms
- Clade: Eudicots
- Clade: Asterids
- Order: Boraginales
- Family: Hoplestigmataceae
- Genus: Hoplestigma; Pierre

Type species
- Hoplestigma klaineanum Pierre

Species
- See text.

Genus of flowering plants

Hoplestigma is a genus of flowering plants in the family Hoplestigmataceae. It is the only genus in the family. It has also been placed in the family Boraginaceae s.l. Its two species are native to Cameroon, Gabon, Ivory Coast and Liberia in western tropical Africa.

== Taxonomy ==
The genus Hoplestigma was established by Jean Baptiste Louis Pierre in 1899. The genus name Hoplestigma is derived from the Greek hople, "a hoof or a cloven hoof" and stigma, "a flower stigma". The botanical name is a reference to the deeply bifid style.

The family placement of the genus has varied. It was traditionally included in Boraginaceae sensu lato, as it was in the APG IV system, and by Plants of the World Online as of December 2025. A study of pollen in 1989 suggested that Hoplestigma might be related to the family Ehretiaceae (= Boraginaceae subfamily Ehretioideae). In a 2014 molecular phylogenetic study based on chloroplast DNA, Hoplestigma formed a strongly supported clade with Coldenia and genera that have been placed in the family Cordiaceae (= Boraginaceae subfamily Cordioideae) and the authors recommended that Hoplestigma and Coldenia be included in Cordiaceae. In 2016, the Boraginales Working Group placed Hoplestigma in its own family Hoplestigmataceae.

=== Species ===
As of December 2025, two species were recognized:

- Hoplestigma klaineanum Pierre
- Hoplestigma pierreanum Gilg

Both are rare trees of lowland jungle in West and Central Africa.
