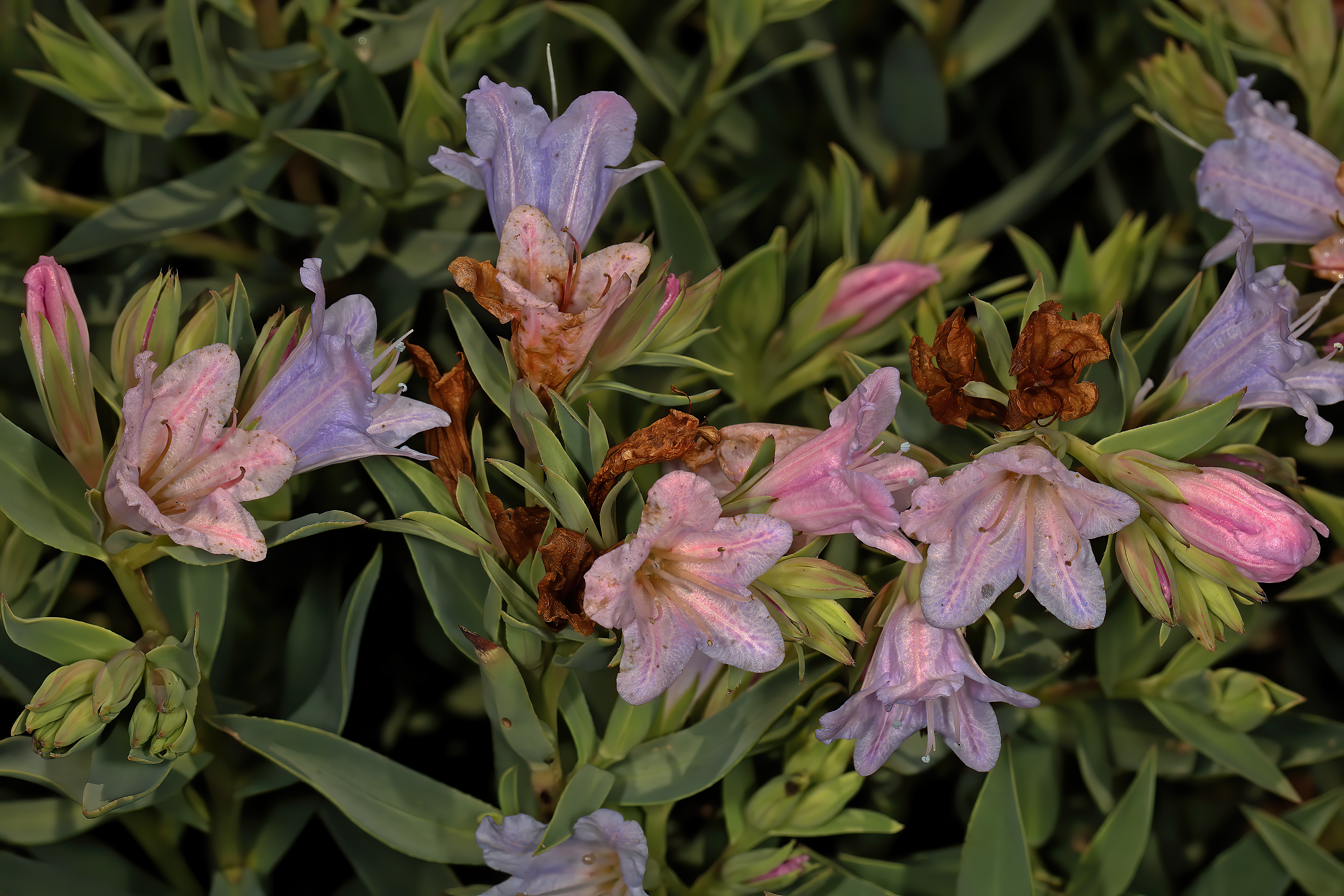

Scientific classification
- Kingdom: Plantae
- Clade: Embryophytes
- Clade: Tracheophytes
- Clade: Angiosperms
- Clade: Eudicots
- Clade: Asterids
- Order: Boraginales
- Family: Boraginaceae
- Genus: Lobostemon
- Species: L. glaucophyllus

Binomial name
- Lobostemon glaucophyllus (Jacq.) H.Buek

Synonyms
- Cynoglossum papillosum (Thunb.) Thunb.; Echium angustifolium Thunb.; Echium falcatum Lam.; Echium glaber Thunb.; Echium glabrum Thunb.; Echium glaucophyllum Jacq.; Echium laevigatum Lam.; Echium papillosum Thunb.; Echium swartzii Lehm.; Lobostemon dregei A.DC.; Lobostemon falcatus Druce; Lobostemon glaber (Thunb.) A.DC.; Lobostemon swartzii (Lehm.) H.Buek; Penthysa glauca Raf.

= Lobostemon glaucophyllus =

Species of plant from South Africa

Lobostemon glaucophyllus, the smooth-leaved bush bugloss or grey healthbush, is a South African plant species belonging to the forget-me-not family. It is endemic to South Africa's Cape Provinces.

== Description ==
This resprouting shrub grows up to 1 m (3.3 ft) tall. The stemless leaves are oblong or lance-like in shape. While the tops of the leaves appear hairless, they are covered in sparse hairs that are largely confined to the margin and apex.

Flowers are present between July and October. They are borne in cymes and are blue or pink to cream in colour. The young young flowering axis is unelongated with the flower buds loosely arranged to form a globose unit. These may or may not spread greatly in the fruiting stage. There are five (or rarely six) stamens which protrude slightly. The staminal scales are rounded and are located about a quarter of a way up the corolla tube.

== Distribution and habitat ==
While it is endemic to South Africa, this species is relatively widely distributed, occurring from Spektakelberg near Springbok in the north to Kleinmond in the south. There is also an isolated population in the Gamka Mountain Reserve. It frequently occurs on granitic soils in the southern parts of its range, where leaves tend to be larger. It also occurs in the more limey soils of the sand plain fynbos, the sandstone soils of the mountain fynbos and the sandy soils of the western coastal plains.
