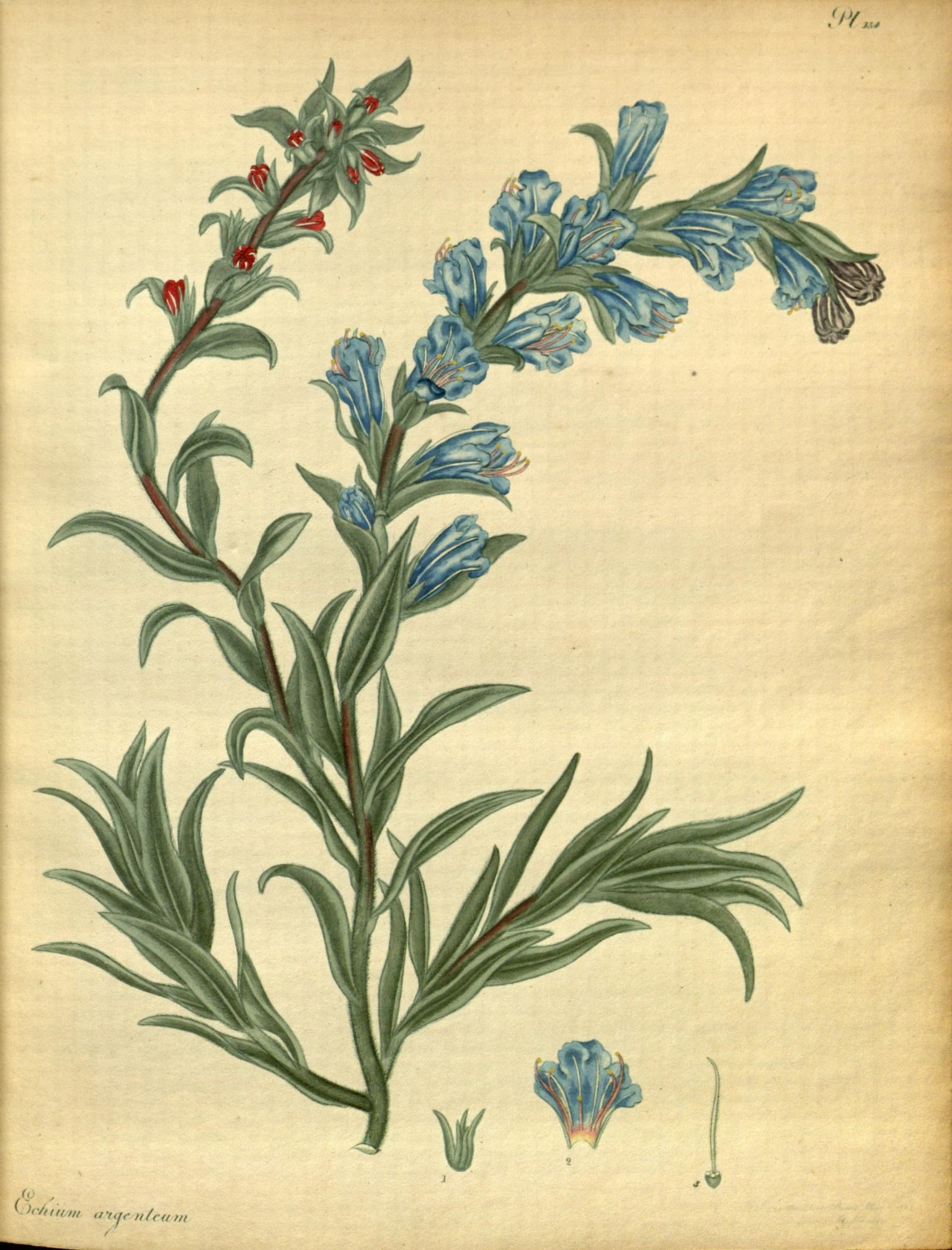

Scientific classification
- Kingdom: Plantae
- Clade: Tracheophytes
- Clade: Angiosperms
- Clade: Eudicots
- Clade: Asterids
- Order: Boraginales
- Family: Boraginaceae
- Genus: Lobostemon
- Species: L. argenteus

Binomial name
- Lobostemon argenteus (P.J.Bergius) H.Buek

Synonyms
- Echium argenteum P.J.Bergius; Echium argenteum Roth; Echium ferocissimum Andr.; Echium ferox Pers.; Echium fruticosum Jacq.; Echium fruticosum var. major Sims; Echium pilicaule (C.H.Wright) I.M.Johnst.; Echium zeyheri (H.Buek) Eckl.; Echium zeyheri (H.Buek) Eckl. ex Steud.; Lobostemon ferocissimus (Andr.) DC.; Lobostemon montanus subsp. minor C.H.Wright; Lobostemon montanus var. minor C.H.Wright; Lobostemon pilicaulis C.H.Wright; Lobostemon zeyheri H.Buek; Oplexion ferox (Pers.) Raf.

= Lobostemon argenteus =

Species of plant endemic to South Africa

Lobostemon argenteus, or the silver healthbush, blue rocket bugloss or disselblaarluibos, is a species in the forget-me-not family that is endemic to South Africa.

== Description ==
This shrublet grows up to 1 m (3.3 ft) in height, although more typically it will be 30–60 cm (0.98–1.97 ft) tall. The stalkless leaves are lance shaped and possess long and short hairs. The bright blue, funnel shaped flowers grow in a spike-like inflorescence, with a single flower growing from each bract. This feature can be used to differentiate this from the similar Lobostemon stachydeus, which has two flowers per bract. The five petals of each flower are hairless on the outside. The five stamens are shortly fused with the petals. The staminal scales occur well below the entrance of the corolla tube, and are reduced to ridges. They lack lateral lobes. Flowers are present between July and February, with peak flowering occurring from August to November. The inflorescences are cymous, meaning that the flowers mature from to bottom. Flowering specimens have been collected as late as April in the Caledon region.

== Distribution and habitat ==
This species exhibits a disjunct distribution, occurring in three distinct regions, suggesting it may have been more widespread in the past. It has a relatively wide distribution, occurring between Clanwilliam and Makhanda. Recent resampling, however, has failed to find specimens in the areas around Kamiesberg or outside of Makhanda. It is found on shale and sandstone slopes. Typically it prefers drier slopes.
