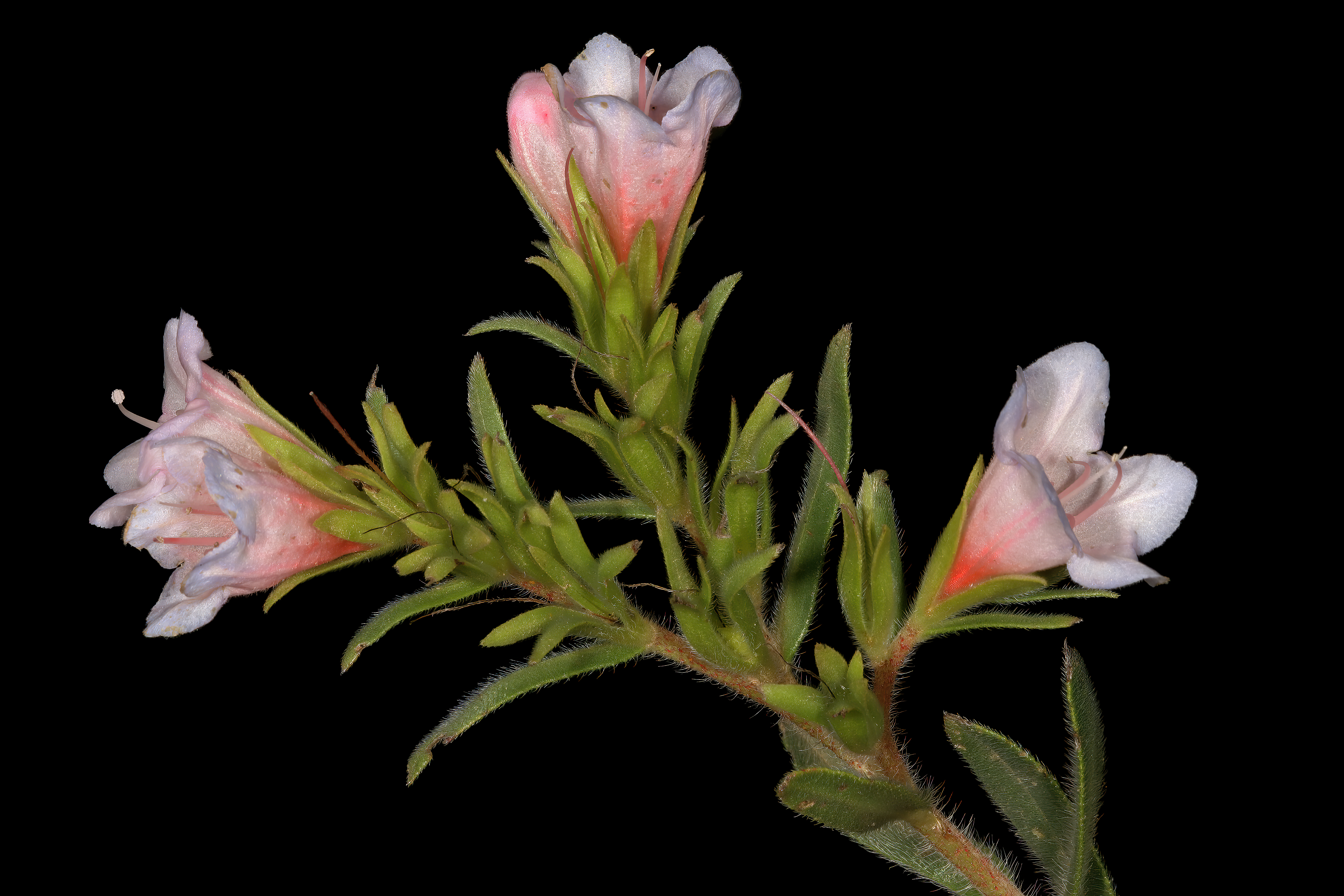

Scientific classification
- Kingdom: Plantae
- Clade: Tracheophytes
- Clade: Angiosperms
- Clade: Eudicots
- Clade: Asterids
- Order: Boraginales
- Family: Boraginaceae
- Genus: Lobostemon
- Species: L. fruticosus

Binomial name
- Lobostemon fruticosus (L.) H.Buek

Synonyms
- Echium africanum Pers.; Echium bergianum E.Mey.; Echium bergianum E.Mey. ex DC.; Echium frondosum Salisb.; Echium fruticosum L.; Echium fruticosum subsp. major Lehm.; Echium fruticosum subsp. minor Curtis; Echium fruticosum var. major Lehm.; Echium fruticosum var. minor Curtis; Echium fruticosum var. minor Sims; Echium longifolium hort.; Echium longifolium hort. ex DC.; Echium obovatum (DC.) I.M.Johnst.; Echium scabrum Thunb.; Echium spathulatum Drège; Echium spathulatum Drège ex DC.; Lobostemon fruticosus subsp. bergianus A.DC.; Lobostemon fruticosus var. bergerianus DC.; Lobostemon fruticosus var. bergianus DC. & A.DC.; Lobostemon lasiophyllus DC.; Lobostemon obovatus DC.; Lobostemon scaber (Thunb.) A.DC.

= Lobostemon fruticosus =

Species of plant from South Africa

Lobostemon fruticosus, also known as the eightday healthbush or pyjamabush, is a species of medicinal plant endemic to the Cape Provinces of South Africa. It is considered to be ecologically and economically important but is declining due to overexploitation.

== Description ==
This shrub grows 50–80 cm (20–31 in) high. It has many long branches emerging from the base. The lower stems are woody while the younger branches towards the tips are soft and are red in colour. The stalkless leaves are narrow and oval shaped, ending in pointed tips. Both the herbaceous stems and the leaves are covered in white hairs.

Flowers are present between May and December. The bell-shaped flowers range from pink to blue in colour and are borne in compound cymes. The colour is variable, but typically the inside and back are pink, washing into blue tips. The young flowering axis is compact with the flower buds loosely arranged to form a globose unit. They spread slightly in the fruiting stage. The stamens are dissimilar in length and typically do not protrude past the rest of the flower. The staminal scales are ridge-like and do not have lateral lobes. They are inserted well below the throat of the corolla tube, 2.5–3.5 mm (0.098–0.138 in) above the base of the corolla tube

The seeds are four little nutlets with spiny tips.

It is easily confused with Lobostemon curvifolius but differs in several small ways. Both long and short hairs are present (compared to uniform hairs), the flowers are smaller (18–23 mm (0.71–0.91 in) compared to 25–28 mm (0.98–1.10 in)) and the leaves are a slightly different shape.

== Distribution and habitat ==
This species is largely confined to the west of the Cape Fold Mountains, where it is found between Namaqualand and the Cape Peninsula. There are, however, also plants in Worcester. Plants are found on sandstone slopes or sandy or shale flats. It is common in Renosterveld due to its preference for shale-derived soils, but agricultural activities have largely confined the species to road verges.

== Ecology ==
The eightday healthbush is often found growing in large groups of individuals. This species is frequently pollinated by bees. Seeds, however, are often of poor quality and germination rates can be low. Like other Lobostemon species, it is a resprouter and can regrow after a fire.

== Medicinal use ==
This species is important in traditional medicine and was used by the KhoiKhoi, the settlers and the Malay people for a variety of conditions. It was mainly used to treat external wounds (including burns and ulcers) and skin conditions. This plant was also commonly used to treat blood poisoning and was at least occasionally to treat stomachaches. A tea made of the leaves of this species was also used as a cure for ringworm in both humans and other animals.

The leaves were applied as a general use plaster. They would, for example, be chewed or pounded into a paste and applied to the injury. The leaves have been shown to have antibacterial properties. They have been shown to be effective against several pathogens, including Bacillus subtilis, Staphylococcus aureus, Escherichia coli, Klebsiella pneumoniae, Pseudomonas aeruginosa and Salmonella typhi. The leaves and twigs also have anti-inflammatory properties. A total of 13 compounds have been isolated, all of which were found to be significantly anti-inflammatory. The concentrations of these compounds seem to vary by region and tend to be highest in the Western Cape.

This plant has also since been shown to have anti-cancer properties and induce apoptosis in lung cancer. It was also found to have similar effects on pancreatic cancer.

This plant was also used in combination with other species. The fresh leaves and branch tips were, for example, used with Psoralea decumbens and Hermannia hyssopifolia to make an ointment to treat erysipelas. The leaves and flowers were also fried in butter with the leaves of Melianthus major and Melianthus comosus and the bulbs of Cyanella lutea to make an ointment for wounds. It was also mixed with Melianthus comosus and Galenia africana to form a watery lotion which was used to treat syphilis.

== Conservation ==
While the conservation status of this species has not formally been assessed, it is believed to be declining. Populations have become fewer and more scattered. This is likely due to overexploitation for medicinal use. Not only are plants removed, but natural regeneration was found to be lower due to the overexploitation of the leaves affecting the root system before flowering and poor seed germination. Stem cuttings are generally found to have a greater success in terms of the recruitment of new plants, although these would simply be clones of the parent plant and as such would not contribute to the genetic diversity of the species.

== Cultivation ==
Although the wild populations of this species seem to be declining, it remains a popular garden plant. This is the only Lobostemon species to be popularly grown as the others can be difficult and unpredictable. While it can be grown from seeds, these are usually difficult to get ahold of. Cuttings of resprouting, non-flowering stems in spring and autumn seem to work best for propagation, although this depends on the substrate that the plant is being planted in. Cuttings planted peat perform best in Autumn, while those planted in sand-polystyrene perform best in spring. The application of plant growth regulators further improve the chance of successful propagation. While many cultivated plants are available, wild plants still dominate the traditional medicine market.
