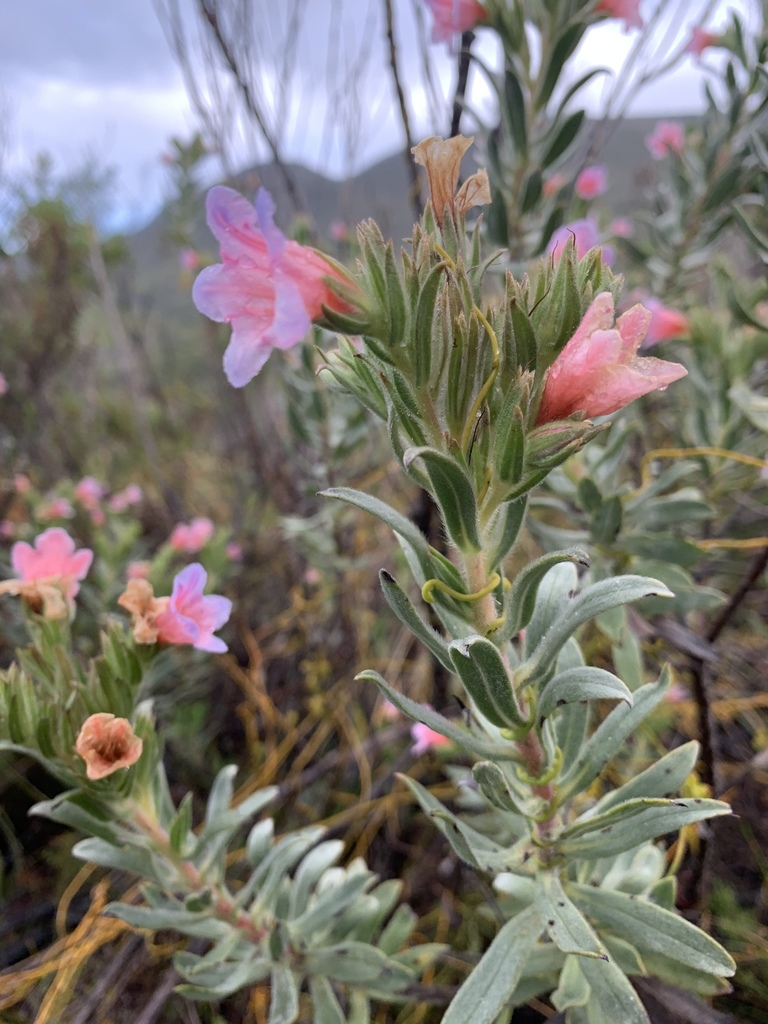

Scientific classification
- Kingdom: Plantae
- Clade: Tracheophytes
- Clade: Angiosperms
- Clade: Eudicots
- Clade: Asterids
- Order: Boraginales
- Family: Boraginaceae
- Genus: Lobostemon
- Species: L. curvifolius

Binomial name
- Lobostemon curvifolius H.Buek

Synonyms
- Echium curvifolium (H.Buek) I.M.Johnst; Lobostemon magnisepalum N.E.Br.

= Lobostemon curvifolius =

Species of plant

Lobostemon curvifolius, the largeflower healthbush, is a species of the forget-me-not family from South Africa.

== Description ==
Lobostemon curvifolius is a resprouting shrub which grows up to 30–60 cm (0.98–1.97 ft) in height. It is frequently confused with Lobostemon fruticosus. The leaves are covered in silvery hairs that lie against the surface on both the upper and lower faces. The midvein is prominent on the underside. The pointed leaf tips may curve back towards the plant.

Flowers are present between August and November. The large (greater than 30 mm (1.2 in)) bell-shaped flowers are borne in compound cincinni with at least three flowers per cymule. The five the sepals are oblong, similar in width and are not fused to each other. The five petals are violet-blue or pink. They are hairy on the outside. The staminal scales are ridge-like and lack lateral lobes. They occur well below the throat of the corolla tube, 3 mm (0.12 in) above the base.

== Habitat and distribution ==
This species is restricted to the fynbos region of the Western Cape of South Africa. It is found from Caledon and Stanford in the Overberg region to Cape Infanta. It does not appear to be restricted to certain soil types and has been found on sandstone, limestone and sandy flats. It has been found in a variety of fynbos habitats, including Kogelberg Sandstone Fynbos near Houw Hoek, Overberg Sandstone Fynbos between Caledon to Agulhas, Sand Fynbos near Bredasdorp, and De Hoop Limestone Fynbos and Potberg Sandstone Fynbos to the east.
