= Lobostemon daltonii =

Scientific classification
- Kingdom: Plantae
- Clade: Tracheophytes
- Clade: Angiosperms
- Clade: Eudicots
- Clade: Asterids
- Order: Boraginales
- Family: Boraginaceae
- Genus: Lobostemon
- Species: L. daltonii

Binomial name
- Lobostemon daltonii Buys

Species of Boraginaceae from South Africa

Lobostemon daltonii, the Infanta healthbush, is a species of the forget-me-not family endemic to the Cape Provinces of South Africa.

== Description ==
This shrublet grows 30–100 cm (0.98–3.28 ft) tall. It has an alternate branching pattern and the herbaceous branches are sparsely hairy. The stalkless leaves are leathery and usually sparsely (rarely very) hairy. When sparsely hairy, the hairs are largely confined to the margins, the midvein and the tip of the leaf. They are oval shaped with a narrower end at the base. The sides may curve downwards (particularly in basal leaves) or upwards.

Flowers are present between August and November and are borne in cymes, with the young buds arranged in two distinct rows. They are blue with conspicuous brown hairs at the tips of the sepals when they are young. The petals are dissimilar in length, with the two anterior lobes being larger than any of the other three petals. The outside of the flower is hairy. The stamens protrude past the petals in adult flowers. The staminal scales are ridge-like.

== Distribution and habitat ==
This species is found between Potberg (De Hoop) and Cape Infanta, where it grows on limestone flats. It is known from only four sites. It seems to prefer the loamy soils in the transition zone between Mountain Fynbos and South and South-west Coast Renosterveld.

== Conservation ==
This species is classified as endangered by the South African National Biodiversity Institute (SANBI). Despite its already restricted range, the population continues to decline as a result of agricultural expansion, development of holiday homes and the spread of invasive alien acacias.
