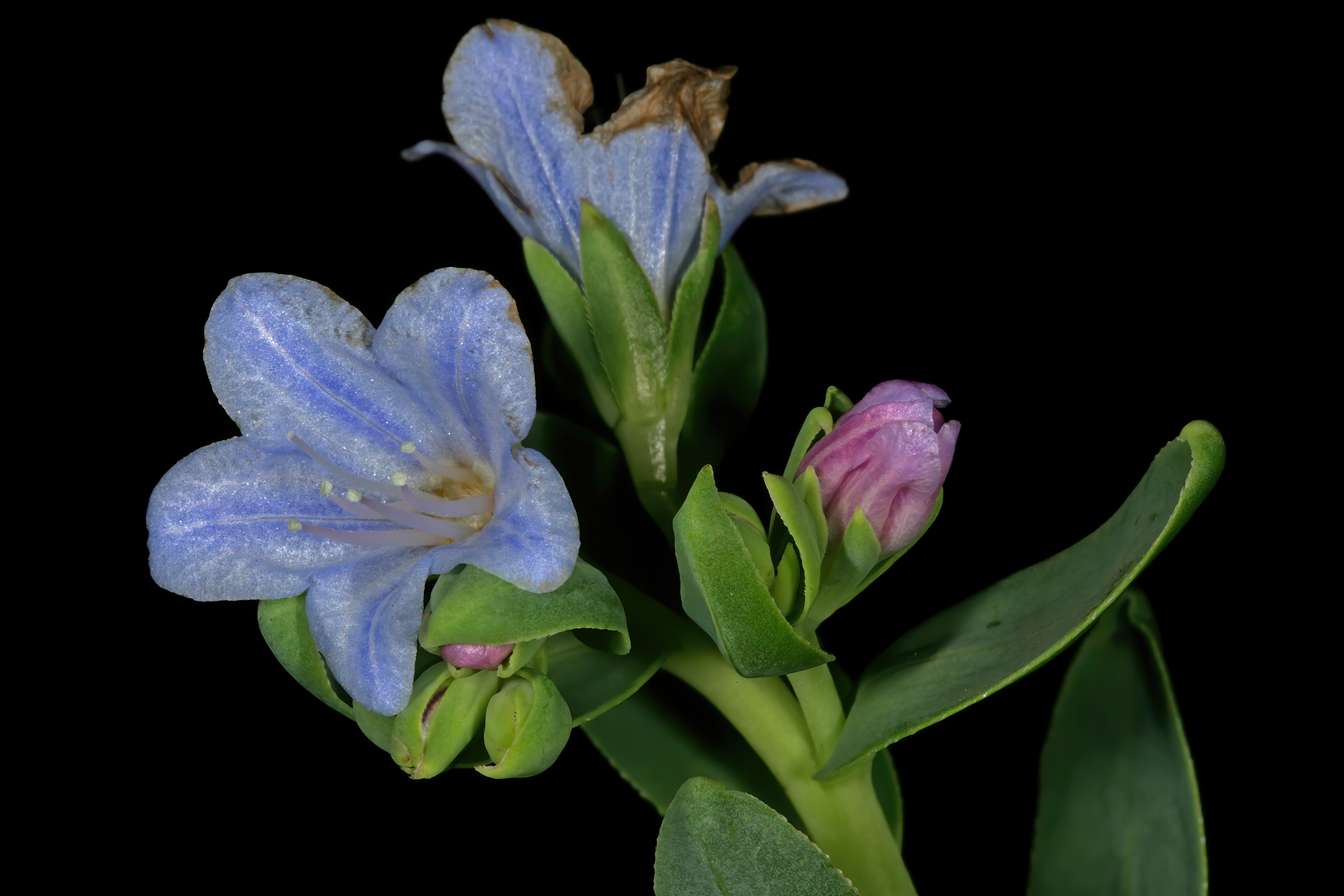
- Lobostemon glaucophyllus

Scientific classification
- Kingdom: Plantae
- Clade: Tracheophytes
- Clade: Angiosperms
- Clade: Eudicots
- Clade: Asterids
- Order: Boraginales
- Family: Boraginaceae
- Genus: Lobostemon; Lehm. (1830)

Species
- 30; see text

Synonyms
- Echiopsis Rchb. (1837); Echiostachys Levyns (1934); Isorium Raf. (1837); Lobostema Spreng.; Oplexion Raf. (1838); Penthysa Raf. (1838); Traxara Raf. (1838)

= Lobostemon =

Genus of flowering plants

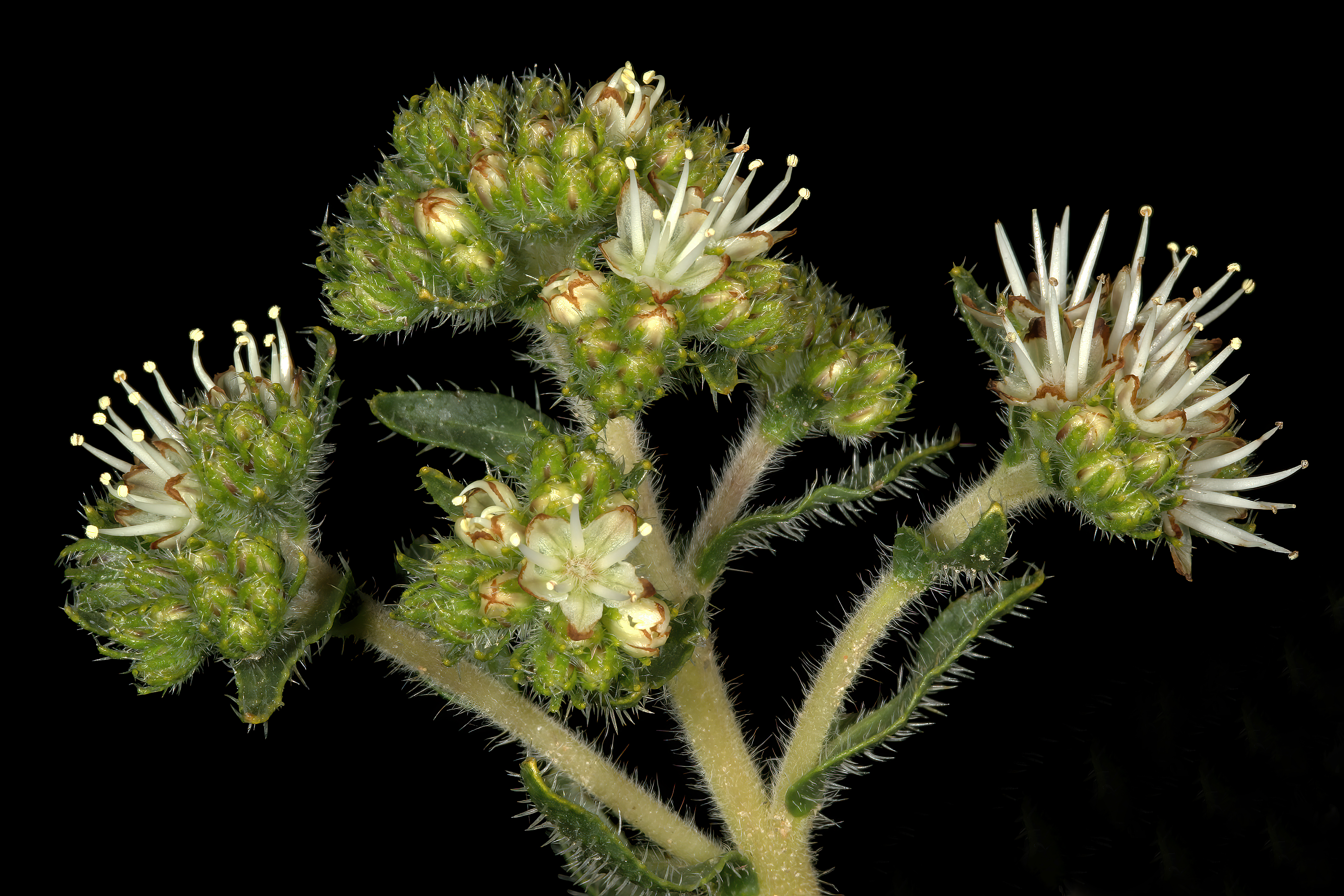
Lobostemon capitatus

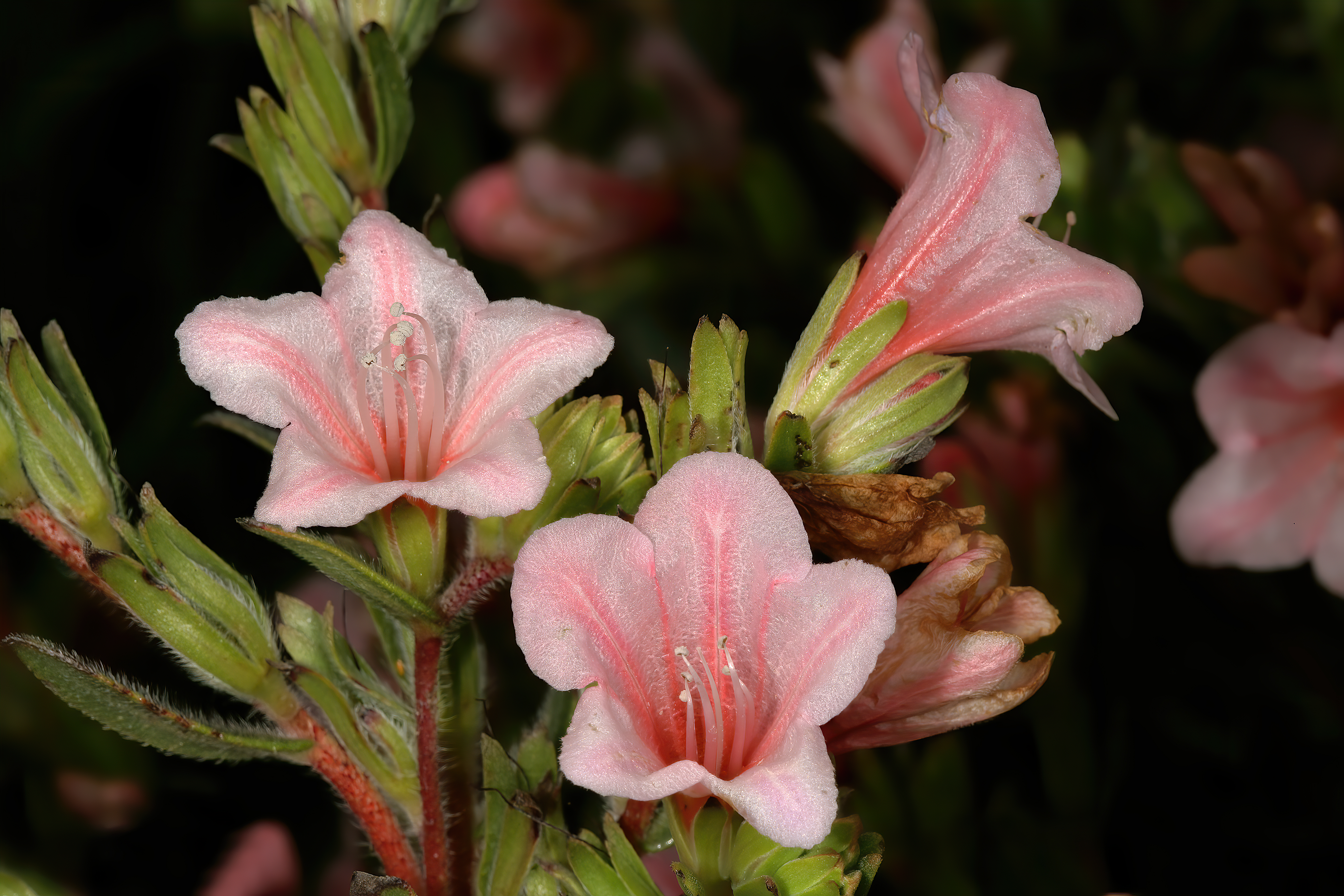
Lobostemon fruticosus

Lobostemon is a genus of flowering plants belonging to the family Boraginaceae. It is endemic to the Cape Provinces of South Africa. The majority of species are limited to the winter rainfall area of the country, from Springbok to Mossel Bay. In Afrikaans these species are known as agtdaegeneesbos, or loosely translated, bush that will heal in eight days. As this name suggests, many species have medicinal properties. This is best known from Lobostemon fruticosus, which is used for treating wounds, blood poisoning, ringworm, skin diseases and syphilis.

== Taxonomy ==
This genus belongs to the forget-me-not family, Boraginaceae. It is closely related to the European genus Echium but differs by the presence of staminal scales in Lobostemon. The genus name is derived from Latin lobos, meaning lobe, and the Greek word stemon, meaning stamen.

== Description ==
This genus is made up of perennial shrubs with alternate leaves that may be hairless or hairy. Plants become densely flowered in early spring. The flowers have 5 sepals, petals, and stamens and are usually bell-shaped. The sepals are mostly free (unfused) and are often dissimilar in size. The staminal filaments are typically well-developed, but they may be reduced to ridges or mere swellings and hairy. The stamen filaments are free from petals or variously fused above staminal scales.

== Distribution and habitat ==
This genus is endemic to the Cape Provinces of South Africa. It is confined to the winter rainfall area from Springbok to Mossel Bay, but several species have ranges that extend further eastward along the coast to about Makhanda, where rain occurs throughout the year.

== Ecology ==
Plants in this genus are resprouters, re-emerging most frequently after a fire. The majority of the species in this genus are pollinated by insects, although those with red flowers tend to be pollinated by birds instead.

== Species ==
The following species are recognised:

- Lobostemon argenteus (P.J.Bergius) H.Buek – Blue rocket bugloss
- Lobostemon belliformis Buys – Gouriqua lobostemon
- Lobostemon capitatus (L.) H.Buek – Brush healthbush
- Lobostemon cinereus DC. & A.DC. – Ash healthbush
- Lobostemon collinus Schltr. ex C.H.Wright – Pajama bush
- Lobostemon curvifolius H.Buek – Largeflower healthbush
- Lobostemon daltonii Buys – Infanta healthbush
- Lobostemon decorus Levyns – Rooiberg healthbush
- Lobostemon echioides Lehm. – Common healthbush
- Lobostemon ecklonianus H.Buek
- Lobostemon fruticosus (L.) H.Buek – Eightday healthbush
- Lobostemon glaber (Vahl) H.Buek – Renoster healthbush
- Lobostemon glaucophyllus (Jacq.) H.Buek – Smooth-leaved bush bugloss
- Lobostemon gracilis Levyns – Robertson healthbush
- Lobostemon hottentoticus Levyns – Helderberg healthbush
- Lobostemon laevigatus (L.) H.Buek – Arid healthbush
- Lobostemon lucidus (Lehm.) H.Buek – Limestone healthbush
- Lobostemon marlothii Levyns – Kleinkaroo healthbush
- Lobostemon montanus H.Buek – Turquoise bush bugloss
- Lobostemon muirii Levyns – Ugly eightday curebush
- Lobostemon oederifolius DC. & A.DC. – Hairy healthbush
- Lobostemon paniculatus (Thunb.) H.Buek – Horrid healthbush
- Lobostemon paniculiformis DC. & A.DC. – Heuwel healthbush
- Lobostemon regulariflorus (Ker Gawl.) Buys – Kloof healthbush
- Lobostemon sanguineus Schltr. – Potberg eightday curebush
- Lobostemon spicatus (Burm.f.) H.Buek
- Lobostemon stachydeus DC. & A.DC. – Karoo healthbush
- Lobostemon strigosus (Sw.) H.Buek – Western Karoo healthbush
- Lobostemon trichotomus (Thunb.) DC. & A.DC. – Bokkeveld healthbush
- Lobostemon trigonus (Thunb.) H.Buek – Eastern healthbush
