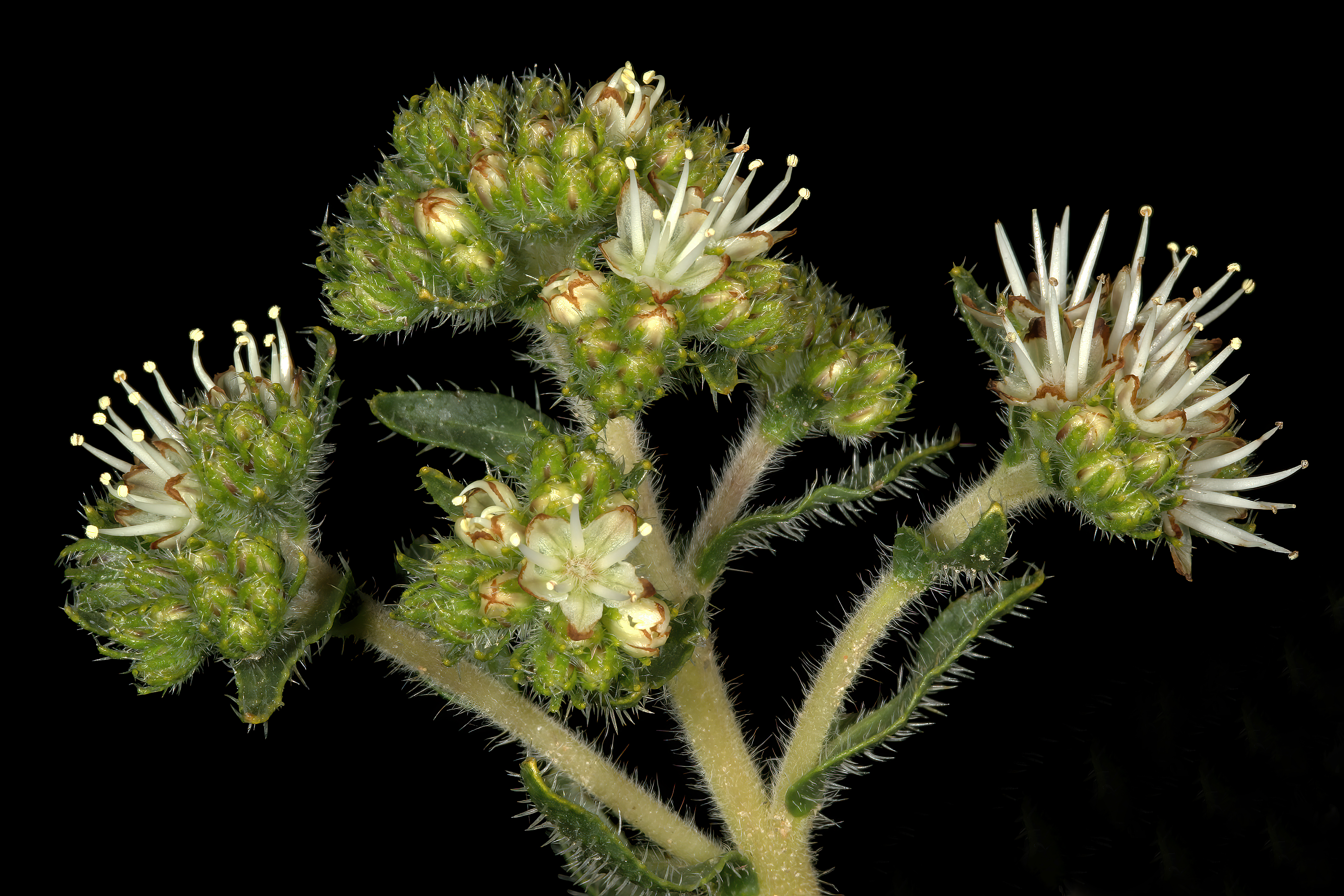

Conservation status
- Vulnerable (SANBI Red List)

Scientific classification
- Kingdom: Plantae
- Clade: Tracheophytes
- Clade: Angiosperms
- Clade: Eudicots
- Clade: Asterids
- Order: Boraginales
- Family: Boraginaceae
- Genus: Lobostemon
- Species: L. capitatus

Binomial name
- Lobostemon capitatus (L.) H.Buek

Synonyms
- Echium capitatum L.; Echium capitiforme (DC.) I.M.Johnst.; Echium cephaloideum (DC.) I.M.Johnst.; Echium hispidum Burm.fil.; Echium sphaerocephalum Vahl; Lobostemon bolusii Levyns; Lobostemon capitiformis DC.; Lobostemon cephaloides DC.; Lobostemon cephaloideus DC., 1846; Lobostemon inconspicuus Levyns; Lobostemon sphaerocephalus (Vahl) H.Buek; Traxara capitata (L.) Raf.

= Lobostemon capitatus =

Species of plant from South Africa

Lobostemon capitatus is a species belonging to the forget-me-not family. It is endemic to the Western Cape of South Africa, where it is found between Porterville and Bredasdorp.

== Description ==
Lobostemon capitatus is a shrub that grows 30–60 cm (0.98–1.97 ft) tall, sometimes reaching a height of up to 80 cm (2.6 ft). The branches are more or less equally spaced and the herbaceous branches are hairy. The leaves are slender, tapering to a point. The undersides of the leaves are covered in hairs. The upper face is hairless or has only a few sparse hairs. The flowers are cream with purple markings. They are small, reaching a length of about 7 mm (0.28 in).They grow as a capitate cyme, meaning that large number of sessile flowers grow from a suppressed rachis. The flower buds arranged in two distinct parallel rows and don't spreading much in fruiting stage. The stamens protrude past the petals in adult flowers. They are typically all of similar length, although one may be shorter than the others. The staminal scales are well developed. They are triangular with lateral lobes. They occur at the throat of the corolla tube, 2–3 mm (0.079–0.118 in) above the base. The area between them is hairy.

== Distribution and habitat ==
This species is endemic to the Western Cape of South Africa, where it is found between Porterville and Bredasdorp where it occurs on shale slopes and flats. It primarily occurs in Renosterveld in the northern parts of its distribution and in Elim Ferricrete Fynbos towards the south east. It is known from fifteen fragmented subpopulations.

== Conservation ==
The South African National Biodiversity Institute (SANBI) has classified Lobostemon capitatus as vulnerable. The small populations continue to decline, largely due to agriculture and urban development, especially in the Durbanville area.
