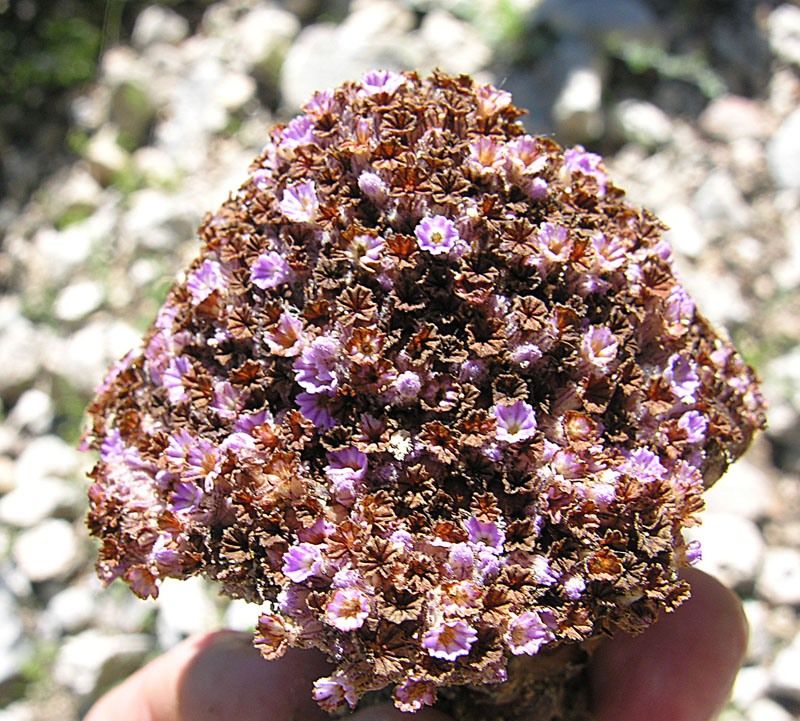
- Oaxaca Province, Mexico

Scientific classification
- Kingdom: Plantae
- Clade: Tracheophytes
- Clade: Angiosperms
- Clade: Eudicots
- Clade: Asterids
- Order: Boraginales
- Family: Lennoaceae
- Genus: Lennoa
- Species: L. madreporoides

Binomial name
- Lennoa madreporoides Lex.

Synonyms
- Corallophyllum caeruleum Kunth; Lennoa caerulea (Kunth) E.Fourn.; Lennoa madreporoides subsp. australis Steyerm.; Lennoa madreporoides var. caerulea (Kunth) Steyerm.; Lennoa madreporoides f. caerulea (Kunth) Yatsk.; Lennoa madreporoides subsp. pringlei Suess.; Lennoa madreporoides subsp. reichei Suess.; Lennoa madreporoides subsp. schaffneri Suess.

= Lennoa =

Genus of plants

Lennoa is a monotypic genus of flowering plants belonging to the family Lennoaceae. Its only known species is Lennoa madreporoides. The genus may also be placed in a broadly circumscribed family Boraginaceae.

The native range of Lennoa madreporoides is Mexico to Venezuela. It is found in the countries of Colombia, Costa Rica, Guatemala, Mexico, Nicaragua and Venezuela. It is found on hillside elevations from 1,000–1,350 m (3,280–4,430 ft) above sea level.

It has the common name of flor de tierra (or “flower of the earth”). It is a root parasite, usually found growing on roots of the Mexican sunflower (Tithonia). The oval mushroom-like stem is 5–15 cm (2–6 in) tall and is covered at maturity with small round, or star-like flowers, which are lavender, or violet with yellow throats. They bloom in the fall (autumn).

The genus name of Lennoa is in honour of Joaquín Leño, a Mexican independence fighter. It has one known synonym Corallophyllum Kunth. The species has the Latin specific epithet of madreporoides which refers to the genus Madrepora (which in Latin means "mother of pores") and the Greco-Roman suffix -oides ("similar to"), due to its resemblance to this genus of corals.

Both the genus and the species were first described and published in P.de La Llave & J.M.de Lexarza, Nov. Veg. Descr. Vol.1 on page 7 in 1824.

== Other sources ==
- Breedlove, DE 1986. Flora of Chiapas. Florist Listings. Mexico 4: i - v, 1–246.
- CONABIO. 2009. Taxonomic catalog of Mexican species. 1. In Capital Nat. Mexico. CONABIO, Mexico City.
- Davidse, G., M. Sousa Sánchez, S. Knapp & F. Chiang Cabrera. 2012. Verbenaceae. 4 (2): 453–473. In G. Davidse, M. Sousa Sánchez, S. Knapp & F. Chiang * * Cabrera (eds.) Fl. Mesoamer .. Missouri Botanical Garden Press, St. Louis.
- Gibson, DN 1970. Lennoaceae. In Standley, PC & LO Williams (eds.), Flora of Guatemala - Part IX, Numbers 1 and 2. Fieldiana, Bot. 24 (9 / 1–2): 96–99.
- Grayum, MH 2007. Lennoaceae. In: Manual of Plants of Costa Rica. Vol. 6. BE Hammel, MH Grayum, C. Herrera & N. Zamora (eds.). Monogr. Syst. Bot. Missouri Bot. Gard. 111: 187-188.
- Hokche, O., PE Berry & O. Huber. (eds.) 2008. New Cat. Fl. Vasc. Venezuela 1–860. Botanical Institute of Venezuela Foundation, Caracas.
- Stevens, WD, C. Ulloa Ulloa, A. Pool & OM Montiel Jarquín. 2001. Flora of Nicaragua. Monogr. Syst. Bot. Missouri Bot. Gard. 85: i-xlii,.
