= Lobostemon glaber =

Scientific classification
- Kingdom: Plantae
- Clade: Tracheophytes
- Clade: Angiosperms
- Clade: Eudicots
- Clade: Asterids
- Order: Boraginales
- Family: Boraginaceae
- Genus: Lobostemon
- Species: L. glaber

Binomial name
- Lobostemon glaber (Vahl) H.Buek

Synonyms
- Echium glabrum Vahl; Echium hispidum Thunb.; Echium vahlii Roem. & Schult.; Lobostemon hispidus (Thunb.) DC.; Lobostemon verrucosus var. dregei DC.; Lobostemon verrucosus var. pauciflorus DC.

Species of plant from South Africa

Lobostemon glaber, the renoster healthbush, is a species of plant from South Africa. It is in the forget-me not family.

== Description ==
This shrub grows 30–60 cm (12–24 in) tall. It has both woody and herbaceous branches. The herbaceous branches and the stemless lance-like leaves are hairy. The hairs are not of uniform length. They may be either of two size classes or fall along a continuous spectrum of lengths.

White or pale pink funnel-shaped flowers are present between August and November. They are borne in cymes. The buds are loosely arranged to form a globose unit or are arranged in two distinct parallel rows, spreading greatly in fruiting stage. The anterior petals are longer and have larger lobes than the rest. They are not hairy. The staminal scales are triangular with lateral lobes. They are inserted below the throat of the corolla tube, 3.8–4.5 mm (0.15–0.18 in) above the base of the corolla tube.

It may be confused with Lobostemon trichotomus, but the hairs on the mericarpids (nutlets) of Lobostemon glaber are diagnostic.

== Distribution and habitat ==
This species is found growing from the Koue Bokkeveld to the Cape Peninsula and Witteberg. It is found growing on shale soils and rocky slopes.

== Ecology ==
This species is popularly visited by bees. It produces a large quantity of nectar, making it a high reward species. Like other Lobostemon species, it is able to resprout after a fire.
