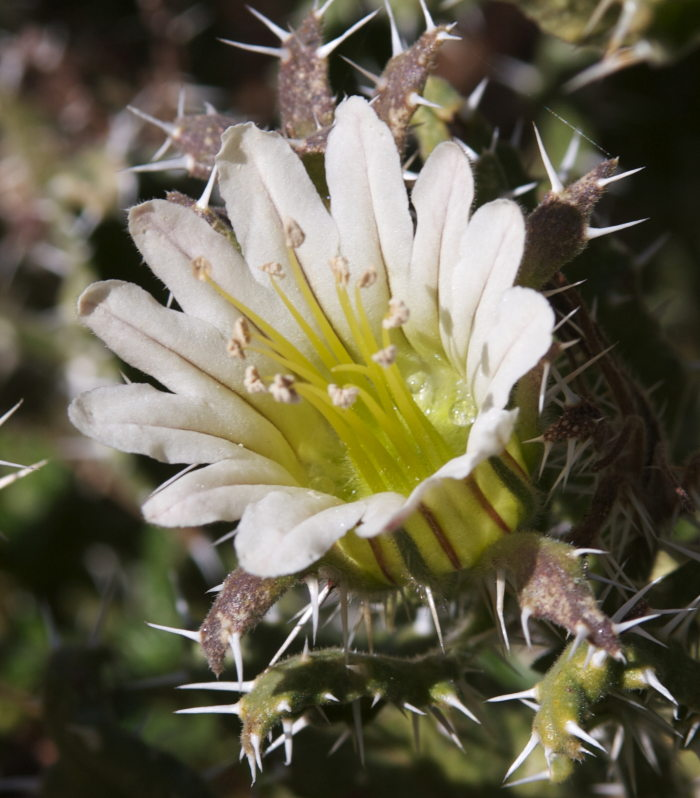
- Codon royenii

Scientific classification
- Kingdom: Plantae
- Clade: Tracheophytes
- Clade: Angiosperms
- Clade: Eudicots
- Clade: Asterids
- Order: Boraginales
- Family: Codonaceae
- Genus: Codon; L.

= Codon (plant) =

Genus of flowering plants

Codon is a small genus of plants from South Africa in the family Codonaceae in the order Boraginales. It is the only genus in the family, and comprises two species.

== Description ==
Codon species are annual to perennial herbs. The whole plants are densely covered with strong mineralised, unicellular trichomes on cystolithic foot-cells. The plants grow from strong taproots.

The flowers are tetracyclic and polymerous. The whorls are 10- to 20-merous with a high variability even within one individual plant. Most common are 12-merous flowers. The sepals are free. The petals are fused up to three quarter of their length. The bases of the filaments are fused with the base of the corolla. The fused parts of the filaments form septa. These septa form separate nectar chambers. The gynoecium is superior and consists of two carpels. The base of the gynoecium forms a lobed nectary disc. Each lobe is covered with nectarostomata and secretes nectar in the nectar chambers. The flowers are bell-shaped and white in C. royenii and saucer-shaped and yellow in C. schenckii.

The fruit is an apical-loculicidal capsule. Seeds are reticulately sculptured.

== Taxonomy ==
Codon has been placed in the families Hydrophyllaceae and Boraginaceae. Phylogenetic analysis in 2014 placed it as sister group to the Wellstediaceae and Boraginaceae s.str, and the separate family Codonaceae was proposed. As of December 2025, placement in Codonaceae is accepted by most taxonomic sources, but not by Plants of the World Online which retains Boraginaceae.

=== Species ===
As of December 2025, the genus includes two species:

| Image | Scientific name | Distribution |
|---|---|---|
| | Codon royenii L. | Cape Provinces, Namibia |
| | Codon schenckii Schinz | Cape Provinces, Namibia |
