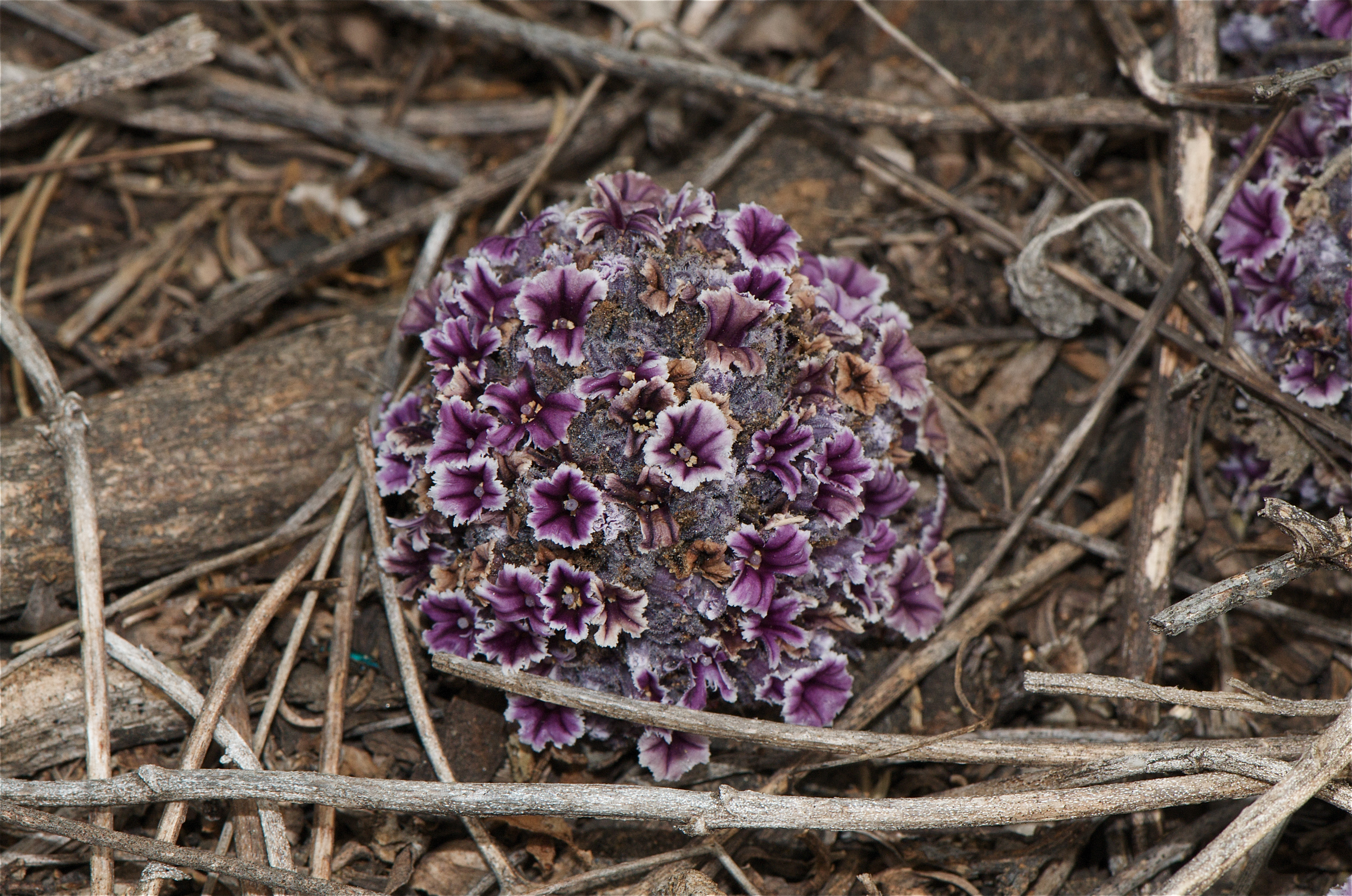
- Pholisma arenarium

Scientific classification
- Kingdom: Plantae
- Clade: Tracheophytes
- Clade: Angiosperms
- Clade: Eudicots
- Clade: Asterids
- Order: Boraginales
- Family: Lennoaceae; Solms

Genera
- See text.

= Lennoaceae =

Family of flowering plants

Lennoaceae is a family in the order Boraginales. Its members are parasitic flowering plants of southwestern North America and northwestern South America. It has also been treated as the subfamily Lennooideae of the family Boraginaceae s.l.

== Description ==
Members of this family are succulent, herbaceous plants with no chlorophyll. The leaves are reduced to short scales, and the plants are entirely parasitic on the roots of their hosts, which are typically Clematis, Euphorbia or various woody Asteraceae.

== Taxonomy ==
The relationships of this family to other plants has been uncertain. It was traditionally treated at family rank as Lennoaceae, and placed in different orders by different authors, including Lamiales (in the Cronquist system) and Solanales (Dahlgren system). More recently, molecular phylogenetic publications grouped it within the clade "Euasterids I", and in the APG II system, it was demoted to a subfamily of the family Boraginaceae. In 2016, the Boraginales Working Group revived Lennoaceae. As of December 2025, the family was accepted by World Flora Online.

=== Genera ===
As of December 2025, World Flora Online accepted two genera:

- Lennoa Lex.
- Pholisma Nutt. ex Hook.

The two genera have around four species, including the desert Christmas tree, Pholisma arenarium, and sandfood, Pholisma sonorae.

== Distribution ==
The family has a disjunct distribution, occurring in Colombia as well as a separate area in southwestern North America, covering parts of California, Arizona and Mexico.
