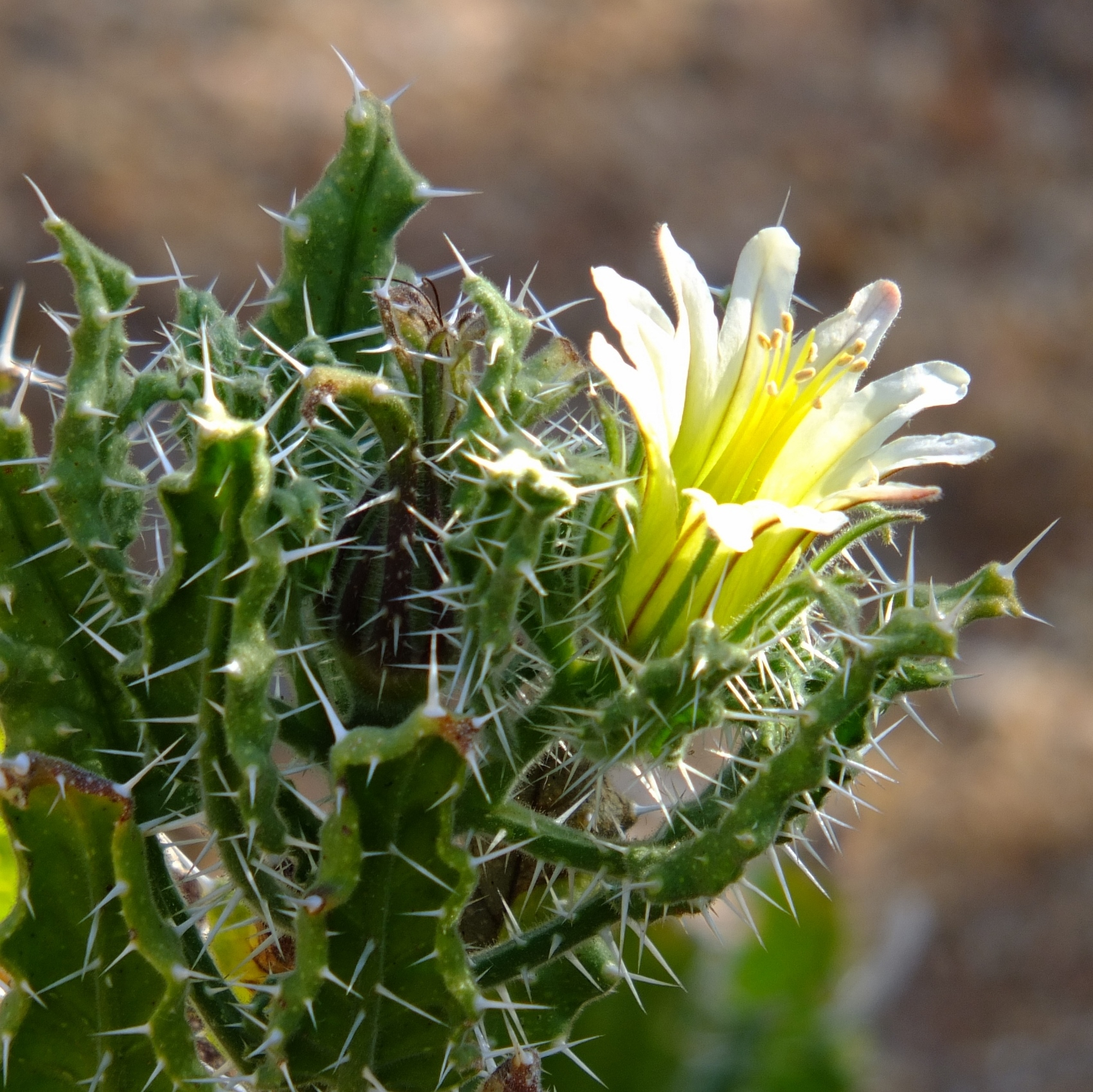

Conservation status
- Least Concern (SANBI Red List)

Scientific classification
- Kingdom: Plantae
- Clade: Tracheophytes
- Clade: Angiosperms
- Clade: Eudicots
- Clade: Asterids
- Order: Boraginales
- Family: Codonaceae
- Genus: Codon
- Species: C. royenii

Binomial name
- Codon royenii L. (1767)

Synonyms
- Codon aculeatum Gaertn. (1790)

= Codon royenii =

Flowering plant endemic to Namibia

Codon royenii is a species of flowering plant in the genus Codon. It is native to Namibia and the Northern Cape Province of South Africa. It is also known by the names honey bush or white nectarcup, or in Afrikaans as heuningbos and suikerkelk (meaning sugar cup).

== Description ==
Codon royenii is an annual or multi-seasonal herb, reaching up to 1.3 m high.

== Distribution ==
Codon royenii is found in Namibia and the Northern Cape, from central Namibia to Gordonia through Namaqualand to Loeriesfontein, Biedouw Mountains, and the Tanqua Karoo.

== Conservation status ==
Codon royenii is classified as Least Concern.
