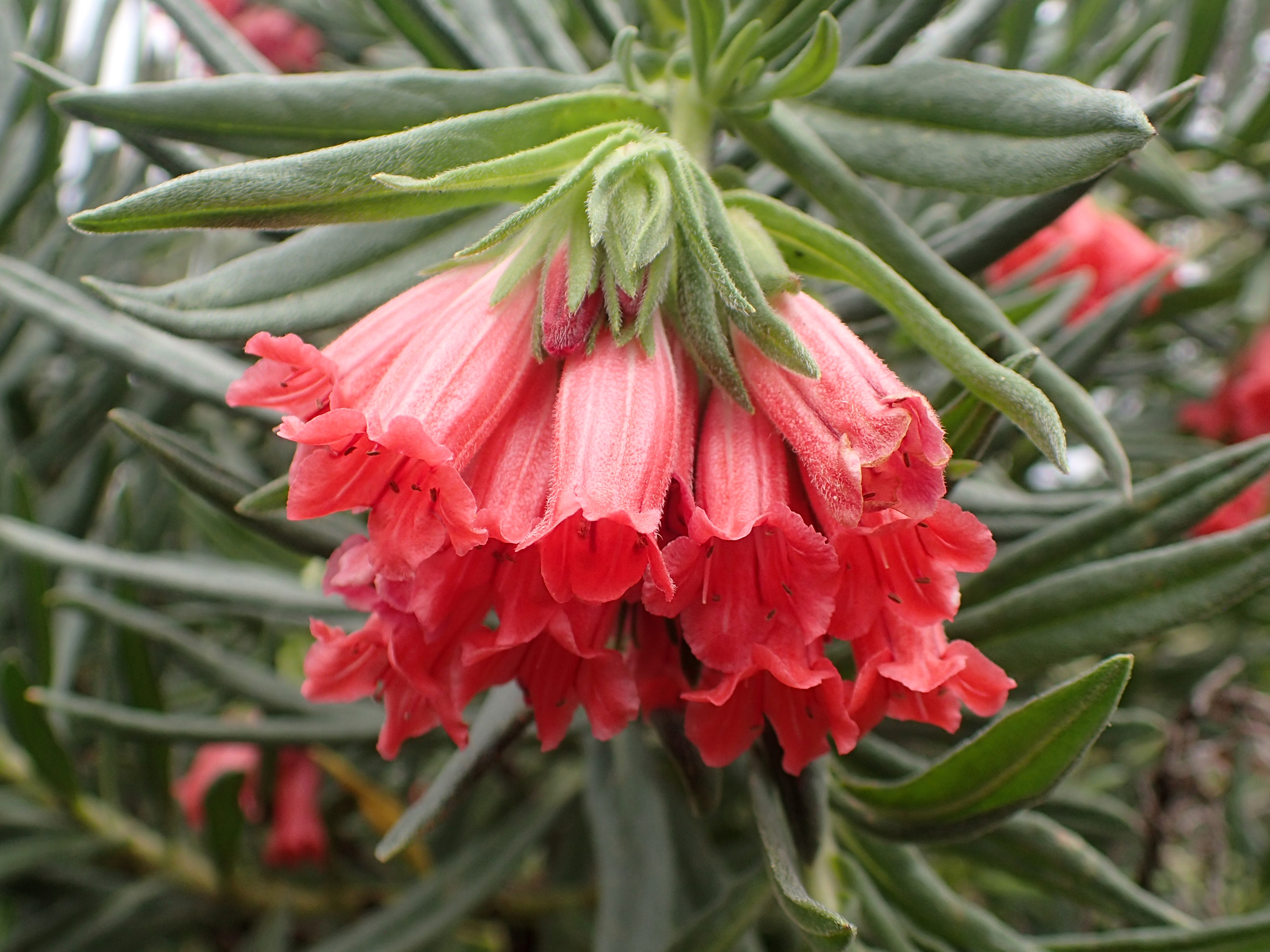

Scientific classification
- Kingdom: Plantae
- Clade: Tracheophytes
- Clade: Angiosperms
- Clade: Eudicots
- Clade: Asterids
- Order: Boraginales
- Family: Boraginaceae
- Genus: Lobostemon
- Species: L. belliformis

Binomial name
- Lobostemon belliformis Buys

= Lobostemon belliformis =

Critically endangered species of plant endemic to South Africa

Lobostemon belliformis, the Gouriqua lobostemon or beaut healthbush, is a critically endangered species in the forget-me-not family. It is known from a single locality on the Riversdale Plain in South Africa.

== Description ==
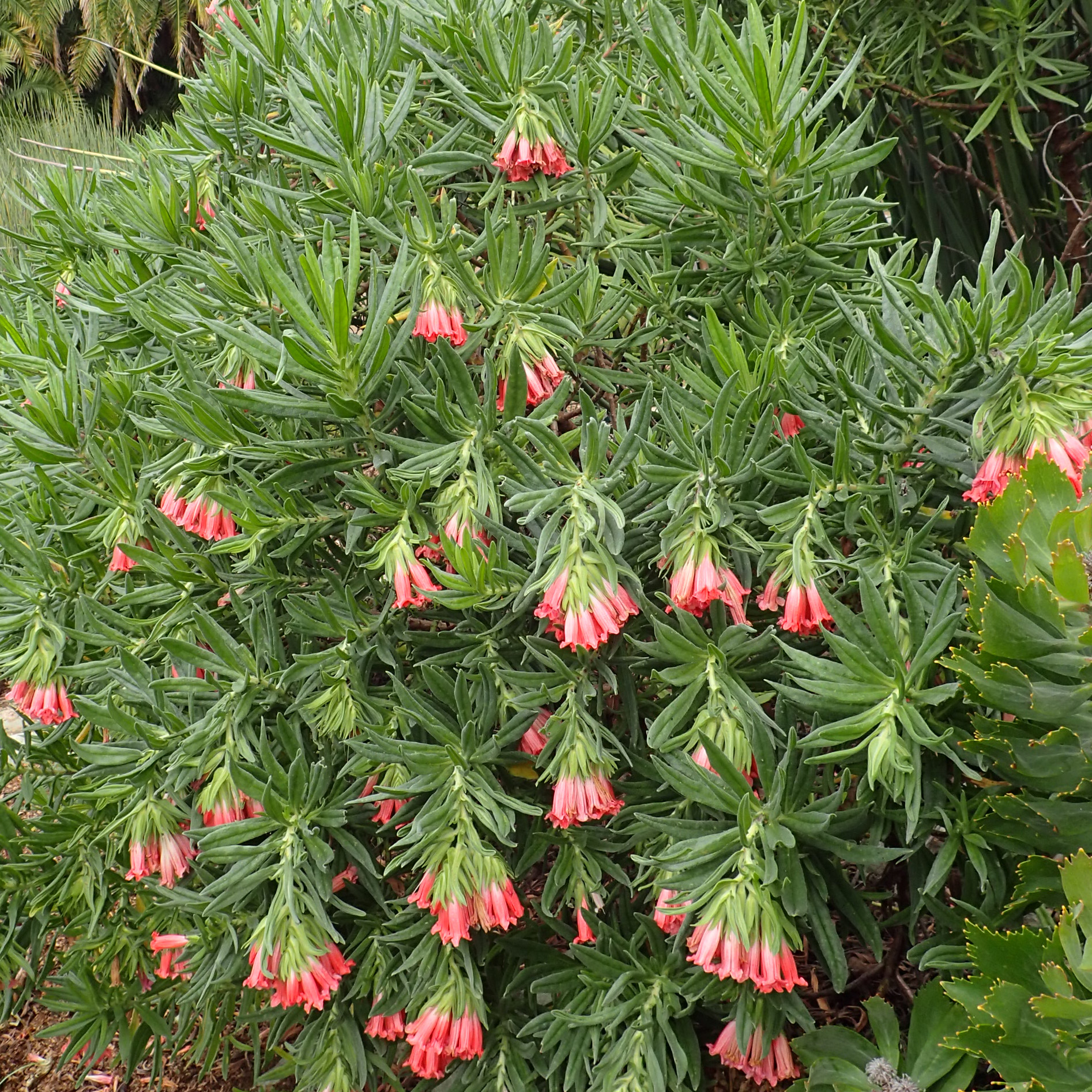
Lobostemon belliformis growth form

This species is a woody shrub that has a thick basal trunk. It branches freely to and form a bright green mound with a rounded habit, growing up to about 2 m (6.6 ft) wide and 1–1.5 m (3.3–4.9 ft) high. The herbaceous branches are covered in hairs. The hair-covered leaves are long and oval-shaped. These hairs give them a rough texture.

The tubular pink or red flowers flare wider at the mouth before opening. They are large (petals are approximately 44–45 mm (1.7–1.8 in) in length) and the outward facing sides of the petals are covered in hairs. They are borne in cymes at the ends of branches between July and October. The stamens are slightly dissimilar in length and the staminal scales are inserted well below the throat of the corolla tube, 3 mm (0.12 in) above the base. The staminal scales are reduced to swellings and they lack lateral lobes. The seeds appear as four little nutlets that have spiny tips.

== Distribution and habitat ==
This species is known from the Gourits River. In present times, it is a highly restricted species and is known from one small sandstone outcrop on the Riversdale Plain. Historically, it was also found on coastal limestone.

== Ecology ==
This appears to be a slow growing species that escapes fire by growing on rocky outcrops and by having thick bark. The generation time is expected to be around 40 years, which is long for a species that lives in an ecosystem in which fire plays such a pivotal role. Over time, plants tend to get increasingly woody and produce fewer flowers. They re-seed in large numbers following a fire. Some shrubs may also resprout after fire if they are not too badly burnt.

The flowers attract both birds and bees, particularly the orange-breasted sunbird, the lesser double-collared sunbird, and the cape sugarbird.

== Conservation ==
This species has been classified as critically endangered by the South African National Biodiversity Institute (SANBI). Over 80% of the plants habitat has been lost since 1980 to mining. The census that was conducted for its red list status listing (published in 2005) found only 22 extant individuals at a single site. While this site is not currently being mined, the risk of this occurring remains a threat. It is also threatened by alien species.

== Cultivation ==
Because of how rare this species is, it is generally speaking, not as commercially available as other species of this genus. It grows best in well-drained sandy soil in warm, sunny areas, particularly on embankments and in rockeries. It requires protection from frost and is not cold-tolerant. When plants begin to lose leaves and die, pruning back about a third of the plant may allow for resprouting from the older wood, particularly if additional compost is provided at the same time.

Plants can be grown from cuttings or from seeds. Cuttings taken from the tips of branches do not root well and should instead be taken from the spindly side shoots re-sprouting from the older wood. Ideally they should be taken in Spring or Autumn. Care must be taken to ensure that they are not allowed to get too wet as they do rot easily. Fresh seeds collected when the old flower heads turn brownish-grey. They should be pretreated with hot water and smoke to simulate fire in order to aid germination.
