= Joseph Humphreys =

American boxing official & announcer (1872-1936)

Joe Humphreys
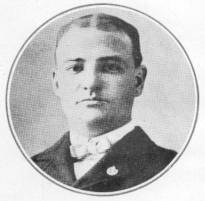
- Born: Joseph Edward Humphreys; October 18, 1872; New York City, United States
- Died: July 10, 1936 (aged 63); Fair Haven, New Jersey, US
- Other name: Joe the Beaut
- Occupation: Boxing announcer
- Known for: Popular fight announcer and boxing official during the early 20th century.
- Children: 1

Joseph Edward Humphreys (October 17, 1872 – July 10, 1936) was an American boxing official and announcer. He was one of the most popular fight announcers from the turn of the 20th century up until the 1930s. In his near 50-year career, Humphreys was estimated to have announced over 20,000 boxing matches and officiated many of the top prize fights of the era as the longtime official ring announcer at the old Madison Square Garden from 1925 up to his death in 1936.

== Biography ==
Joseph Edward Humphreys was born in New York City on October 17, 1872. He grew up at 54 Oliver Street on the Lower East Side, not far from the birthplace of future Governor of New York Alfred E. Smith, and who later was a childhood friend. His father died when he was 11 years old and became a newsboy to help support his family. During his years as a newsboy, he was known as a "lusty-lunged youngster" whose voice led him to obtain a position at the New York Produce Exchange as a broker's page. To make some extra money, Humphreys also began singing in clubs, smokers and benefits. At age 15, he was a bartender and later became a mascot of the old Nonpareil Athletic Club where he was originally introduced to boxing. It was while performing at Gus Maisch's Little Casino in 1888, a popular establishment near New Bowery, that he agreed to be a last minute replacement as the night's official ring announcer when the regular man was unable to appear. Humphreys became an instant success and became a full-time announcer.

By the early 20th century, Humphreys had become the single most popular boxing announcer in the New York-area. Harry Grayson, boxing writer for the New York World-Telegram once wrote, "Joe Humphreys had voice, presence, personality, tact, and razorblade Irish wit". He was particularly known for his distinctive and colorful announcing style, mannerisms and catchphrases, most notably, "the win-ah and new champion!" when announcing a title change. He was also able to silence noisy and unruly crowds by shouting "Quiet please!" following with a "mollifying spread of his arms".

In August 1910, he and actor Raymond Hitchcock purchased the original Chinese Theatre in Chinatown, Manhattan and turned it into the first movie theatre in the area. The movie house failed to catch on in the Chinese-American community, partly due to the ongoing Tong wars, and they eventually sold the property to the New York Rescue Society for use as a mission.

He also developed both close friendships and friendly rivalries with fellow announcers Tim Hurst and Charles J. Harvey, outlasting Harvey when he retired from announcing to become secretary of the New York Boxing Commission following the passage of the Frawley Law in 1911 and eventually became a manager. When Tex Rickard began promoting boxing at the old Madison Square Garden in 1925, Humphreys was hired as official ring announcer and was present at many of the top prize fights held at the venue including Jack Dempsey's bouts against Georges Carpentier, Luis Firpo and Gene Tunney. He was a major fan of Gene Tunney and Jack Dempsey, regarding the latter as "the most devastating fighter ever to step in the ring". He often claimed that Dempsey's bout against Firpo was "the most exciting he had ever witnessed".

Humphreys was also highly skilled at using current events during his performances. For example, during the Jack Sharkey vs. Jim Maloney on May 20, 1927, he asked the crowd of 40,000 at Yankee Stadium to stand and observe a moment of silence for Charles Lindbergh who had left earlier that day on his transatlantic flight from New York to Paris.

Humphreys also became involved behind the scenes and was associated with Sam H. Harris in the management of then world bantamweight and featherweight champion Terry McGovern. Upon his request, his granddaughter Terry was named in McGovern's honor. In 1929, he publicly stated that he intended to remain an announcer for 50 years. He was never known to take any special care for his voice, save chewing on a cough drop or when his throat became dry, and was opposed to using microphones when they were first introduced at Madison Square Garden.

Humphreys suffered a serious stroke in June, 1933 which sidelined him for only two months. He resumed his role August 17 of that year at Madison square garden. He made a few remarks to an enthusiastic crowd. At the third meeting between Barney Ross and Jimmy McLarnin in 1935, he was unable to enter the ring and had to do his introductory announcements from ringside. However, he was so ill that he was unable to attend the championship bout between Max Baer and James J. Braddock on June 13, 1935, and missed the first major fight in his career.

He spent a month in the hospital and made his in-ring return at Yankee Stadium, welcomed by the 95,000 fans in attendance, to announce Max Baer-Joe Louis fight on September 24, 1935. Humphreys continued working at Madison Square Garden during the 1935–36 season, but announced only the main events. Although he lived most of his life in New York City, where he exclusively performed during his career, Humphreys spent his later years in Red Bank, New Jersey and New Rochelle, New York.

In late-June 1936, Humphreys fell seriously ill and was confined to his home in Fair Haven, New Jersey for three weeks. On the morning of July 10, he apparently collapsed from heat and was unable to speak coherently. Falling into a coma at around 2:00 pm, he died an hour and a half later. His son and daughter-in-law, as well as his grand daughter Terry, were at his bedside at the time of his death.

In 1997, Humphreys was inducted into the International Boxing Hall of Fame as a "non-participant".
