= Beaud =

Beaud is a French surname. Notable people with the surname include:

- Clément Beaud (born 1980), Cameroonian former footballer
- Marie-Claude Beaud (1946–2024), French exhibition curator and director of art institutions
