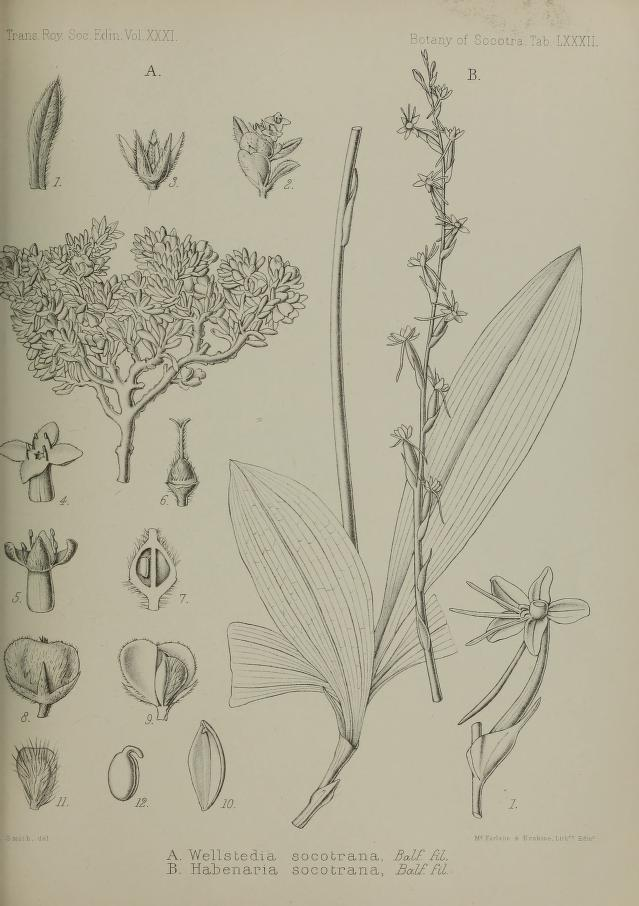
- Wellstedia socotrana (left)

Scientific classification
- Kingdom: Plantae
- Clade: Tracheophytes
- Clade: Angiosperms
- Clade: Eudicots
- Clade: Asterids
- Order: Boraginales
- Family: Wellstediaceae; Novák
- Genus: Wellstedia; Balf.f.

Type species
- Wellstedia socotrana Balf.f.

= Wellstedia =

Genus of flowering plants

Wellstedia is a genus of flowering plants traditionally included in the family Boraginaceae s.l., but placed in its own family, Wellstediaceae, within the order Boraginales, by the Boraginales Working Group. It is the only genus in the family.

Species include:

- Wellstedia dinteri Pilg.
- Wellstedia filtuensis D.R.Hunt & Lebrun
- Wellstedia laciniata Thulin & A.Johanss.
- Wellstedia robusta Thulin
- Wellstedia socotrana Balf.f.
- Wellstedia somalensis Thulin & A.Johanss.

== Bibliography ==
- Luebert, Federico; Cecchi, Lorenzo; Frohlich, Michael W.; Gottschling, Marc; Guilliams, C. Matt; Hasenstab-Lehman, Kristen E.; Hilger, Hartmut H.; Miller, James S.; Mittelbach, Moritz; Nazaire, Mare; Nepi, Massimo; Nocentini, Daniele; Ober, Dietrich; Olmstead, Richard G.; Selvi, Federico; Simpson, Michael G.; Sutorý, Karel; Valdés, Benito; Walden, Genevieve K.; Weigend, Maximilian (24 June 2016). "Boraginales Working Group: Familial classification of the Boraginales". Taxon. 65 (3): 502–522. doi:10.12705/653.5. hdl:2158/1062790.
