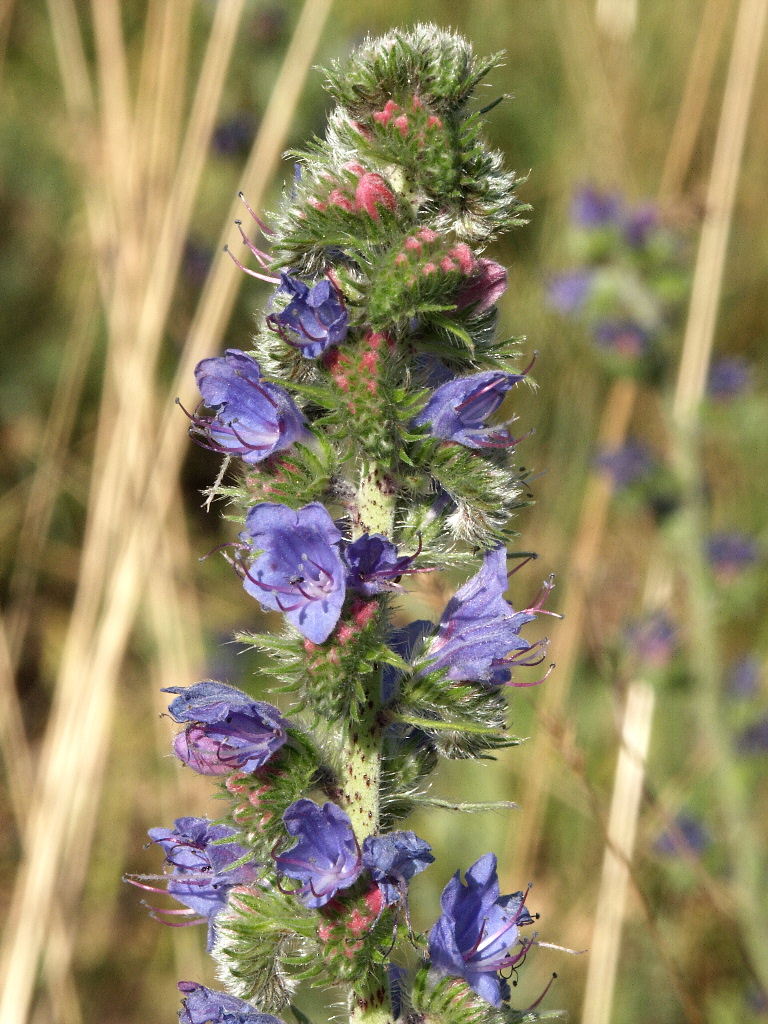
- Echium vulgare

Scientific classification
- Kingdom: Plantae
- Clade: Tracheophytes
- Clade: Angiosperms
- Clade: Eudicots
- Clade: Asterids
- Clade: Lamiids
- Order: Boraginales; Juss. ex Bercht. & J.Presl

Families
- List: Boraginaceae s.str.; Codonaceae; Coldeniaceae; Cordiaceae; Ehretiaceae; Heliotropiaceae; Hoplestigmataceae; Hydrophyllaceae; Lennoaceae; Namaceae; Wellstediaceae

= Boraginales =

Order of flowering plants

Boraginales is an order of flowering plants in the asterid clade, with a total of about 125 genera and 2,700 species. Different taxonomic treatments either include only a single family, the Boraginaceae, or divide it into up to eleven families. Its herbs, shrubs, trees and lianas (vines) have a worldwide distribution.

== Taxonomy ==
=== History ===
The classification of plants now known as Boraginales dates to the Genera plantarum (1789) when Antoine Laurent de Jussieu named a group of plants Boragineae, to include the genus Borago, now the type genus. However, since the first valid description was by Friedrich von Berchtold and Jan Svatopluk Presl (1820), the botanical authority is given as Juss. ex Bercht. & J.Presl, ex (Latin, meaning 'out of', 'from') indicating the prior authority of Jussieu. Lindley (1853) changed the name to the modern Boraginaceae.

Jussieu divided the Boragineae into five groups. Since then Boraginaceae has been treated either as a large family with several subfamilies, or as a smaller family with several closely related families. The family had been included in a number of higher order taxa, but in 1926 Hutchinson erected a new order, Boraginales, to include the Boraginaceae.

Although Boraginales was included in a number of taxonomic classifications including Dahlgren (1980), Takhtajan (1997) and Kubitzki (2016) as an order, it was not recognized in either of two major systems, the Cronquist system and the APG system. In the Cronquist system, Boraginaceae (including Cordiaceae, Ehretiaceae, and Heliotropiaceae) and Lennoaceae were placed in the order Lamiales, while the related Hydrophyllaceae was placed in Solanales.

The APG system took a broad view of Boraginaceae (Boraginaceae s.l.), including within it the traditionally recognized families Hydrophyllaceae and Lennoaceae based on recent molecular phylogenies that show that Boraginaceae, as traditionally defined, is paraphyletic over these two families. APG III included Boraginaceae in the Euasterid I (lamiid) clade but this family was otherwise unplaced; its precise relationship to other families in the Euasterid I group remained unclear. In a phylogenetic study of DNA sequences of selected genes, Boraginales was resolved as sister to Lamiales sensu APG, but that result had only 65% maximum likelihood bootstrap support.

In the 2016 APG IV system Boraginales is an order with only one family Boraginaceae, which includes the former family Codonaceae. At the time of the APG IV consensus there was insufficient support to further divide this monophyletic group further. (For a complete discussion of the history of the taxonomy of Boraginales, see BWG (2016))

=== Boraginales Working Group ===
Following the publication of APG IV, a collaborative group along similar lines to the APG, the Boraginales Working Group (BWG), has published an alternative taxonomy based on the phylogenetic relationships within the Boraginaceae s.l. This classification split the order into eleven families, including: Boraginaceae s.s. or s.str., Cordiaceae, Ehretiaceae, Heliotropiaceae, and Hydrophyllaceae. A number of these were monogeneric. Boraginaceae s.s. is hard to characterize morphologically if it includes the genera Codon and Wellstedia. Codon was long regarded as an unusual member of Hydrophyllaceae, but in 1998, a molecular phylogenetic study showed that it is closer to Boraginaceae, and both Codon and Wellstedia have been allocated to their own families, Codonaceae and Wellstediaceae.

The achlorophyllous holoparasites Lennoa and Pholisma were once regarded as a family, Lennoaceae, but it is now known that they form a clade that is nested within Ehretiaceae. Some studies indicated that Hydrophyllaceae was paraphyletic if the tribe Nameae was included within it, and the BWG recognizes the segregate family Namaceae.

The inclusion of the genus Hoplestigma in Boraginales was occasionally doubted until it was strongly confirmed in a cladistic study in 2014. Hoplestigma is a sister taxon of Cordiaceae, and is recognized in the segregate family Hoplestigmataceae.

The BWG classification of the Boraginales is based on the cladogram:

- Boraginales
  - Boraginales I
    - Codonaceae
    - - Wellstediaceae
      - Boraginaceae s.s.
  - Boraginales II
    - Hydrophyllaceae
    - - Namaceae
      - - Heliotropiaceae
        - - - Lennoaceae
            - Ehretiaceae
          - - Hoplestigmataceae
            - - Coldeniaceae
              - Cordiaceae

Hydrolea was thought to belong in Hydrophyllaceae for more than a century after it was placed there by Asa Gray, but it is now known to belong in the order Solanales as sister to Sphenoclea.

Pteleocarpa was long regarded as an anomaly, and was usually placed in Boraginales, but with considerable doubt. The molecular evidence strongly supports it as sister to Gelsemiaceae, and that family has been expanded to include it.

== Bibliography ==
- Kadereit, Joachim W.; Bittrich, Volker, eds. (2016). "Conspectus of the families of Boraginales". Flowering Plants. Eudicots: Aquifoliales, Boraginales, Bruniales, Dipsacales, Escalloniales, Garryales, Paracryphiales, Solanales (except Convolvulaceae), Icacinaceae, Metteniusaceae, Vahliaceae. Springer. pp. 4–7. ISBN 978-3-319-28534-4.
- APG (2016). "An update of the Angiosperm Phylogeny Group classification for the orders and families of flowering plants: APG IV". Botanical Journal of the Linnean Society. 181 (1): 1–20. doi:10.1111/boj.12385.
- Ferguson, Diane M. (July 1998). "Phylogenetic Analysis and Relationships in Hydrophyllaceae Based on ndhF Sequence Data". Systematic Botany. 23 (3): 253–268. Bibcode:1998SysBo..23..253F. doi:10.2307/2419504. JSTOR 2419504.
- Luebert, Federico; Cecchi, Lorenzo; Frohlich, Michael W.; Gottschling, Marc; Guilliams, C. Matt; Hasenstab-Lehman, Kristen E.; Hilger, Hartmut H.; Miller, James S.; Mittelbach, Moritz; Nazaire, Mare; Nepi, Massimo; Nocentini, Daniele; Ober, Dietrich; Olmstead, Richard G.; Selvi, Federico; Simpson, Michael G.; Sutorý, Karel; Valdés, Benito; Walden, Genevieve K.; Weigend, Maximilian (24 June 2016). "Boraginales Working Group: Familial classification of the Boraginales". Taxon. 65 (3): 502–522. doi:10.12705/653.5. hdl:2158/1062790.
- "Boraginales Working Group". 2019.
- Weigend, Maximilian; Luebert, Federico; Gottschling, Marc; Couvreur, Thomas L.P.; Hilger, Hartmut H.; Miller, James S. (October 2014). "From capsules to nutlets-phylogenetic relationships in the Boraginales". Cladistics. 30 (5): 508–518. doi:10.1111/cla.12061. PMID 34794245. S2CID 11954615.
- Hilger, Hartmut H; Cole, Theodor H C (2018). "Boraginales Phylogeny Poster". Boraginales Working Group. Archived from the original on 11 June 2020.
- d'Aillon, Francois Gros (2016). "The family Boraginaceae Jussieu". UQAM. Archived from the original on 3 January 2020.
- Diane, N., H. Förther, and H. H. Hilger. 2002. A systematic analysis of Heliotropium, Tournefortia, and allied taxa of the Heliotropiaceae (Boraginales) based on ITS1 sequences and morphological data. American Journal of Botany 89: 287–295 (online abstract here Archived 2010-06-26 at the Wayback Machine).
- Gottschling, M., H. H. Hilger 1, M. Wolf 2, N. Diane. 2001. Secondary Structure of the ITS1 Transcript and its Application in a Reconstruction of the Phylogeny of Boraginales. Plant Biology (Stuttgart) 3: 629–636 (abstract online here Archived 2007-09-30 at the Wayback Machine)

=== Historical sources ===
- Berchtold, Friedrich von; Presl, Jan Svatopluk (1820). "Boragineae". O Přirozenosti Rostlin [On the Nature of Plants]. Prague: Krala Wiljma Endersa. p. 244.
- Jussieu, Antoine Laurent de (1789). "Borragineae". Genera Plantarum, secundum ordines naturales disposita juxta methodum in Horto Regio Parisiensi exaratam. Paris. pp. 128–132. OCLC 5161409.
- Lindley, John (1853) [1846]. "Boraginaceae". The Vegetable Kingdom: or, The structure, classification, and uses of plants, illustrated upon the natural system (3rd. ed.). London: Bradbury & Evans. pp. 655–656.
