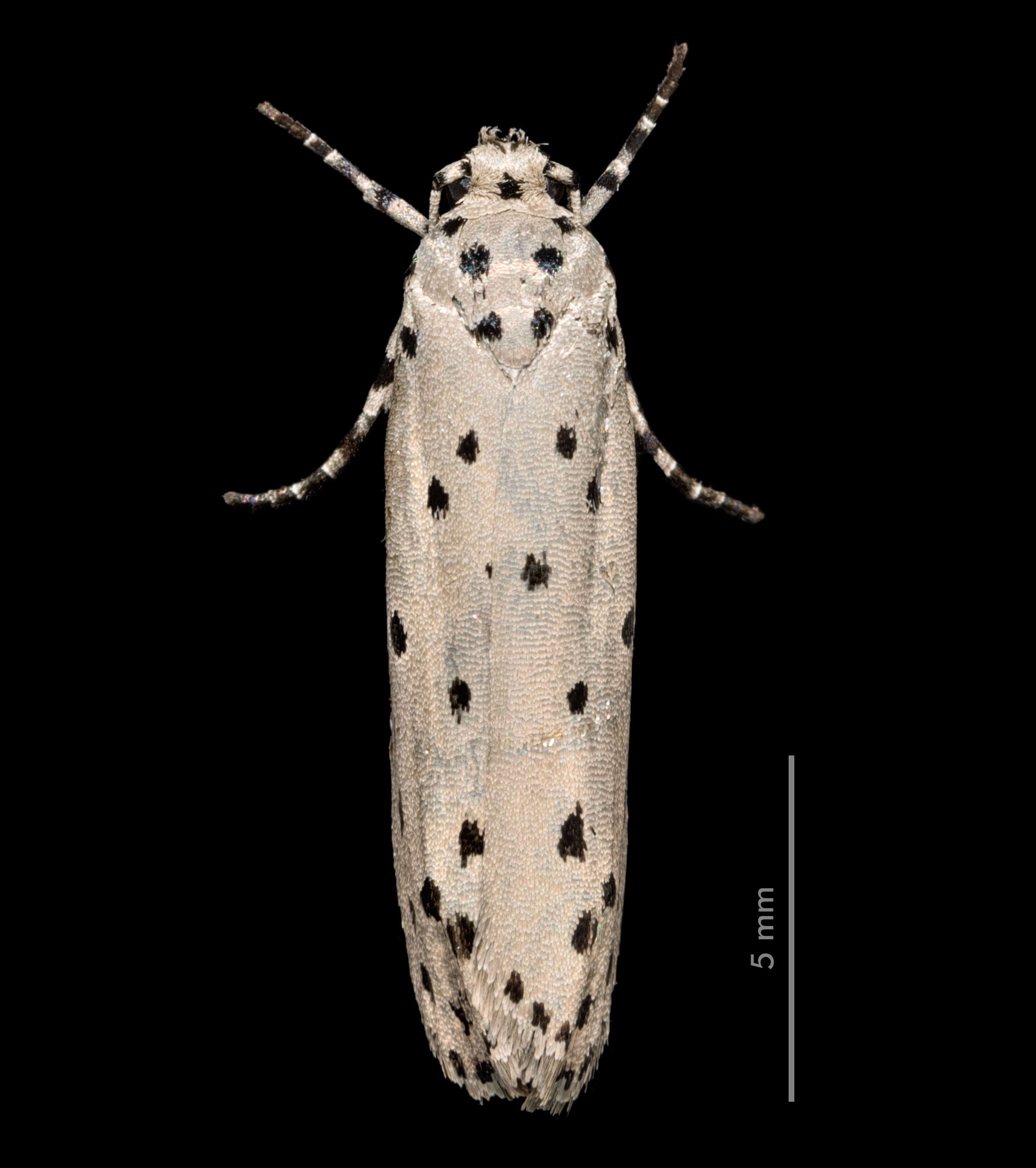

Scientific classification
- Kingdom: Animalia
- Phylum: Arthropoda
- Clade: Pancrustacea
- Class: Insecta
- Order: Lepidoptera
- Family: Depressariidae
- Genus: Ethmia
- Species: E. nigroapicella

Binomial name
- Ethmia nigroapicella (Saalmüller, 1880)

Synonyms
- Psecadia nigroapicella Saalmüller, 1880; Ethmia colonella Walsingham, 1907; Ethmia meteoris Meyrick, 1911; Ethmia systematica Meyrick, 1922; Psecadia apicalis Matsumura, 1931

= Ethmia nigroapicella =

Species of moth

Ethmia nigroapicella, commonly known as the kou leafworm, is a moth of the family Depressariidae. It is found in Madagascar, the Seychelles, India, Assam, Burma, Samoa, the Philippines, Hawaii, Taiwan, Japan and Australia.

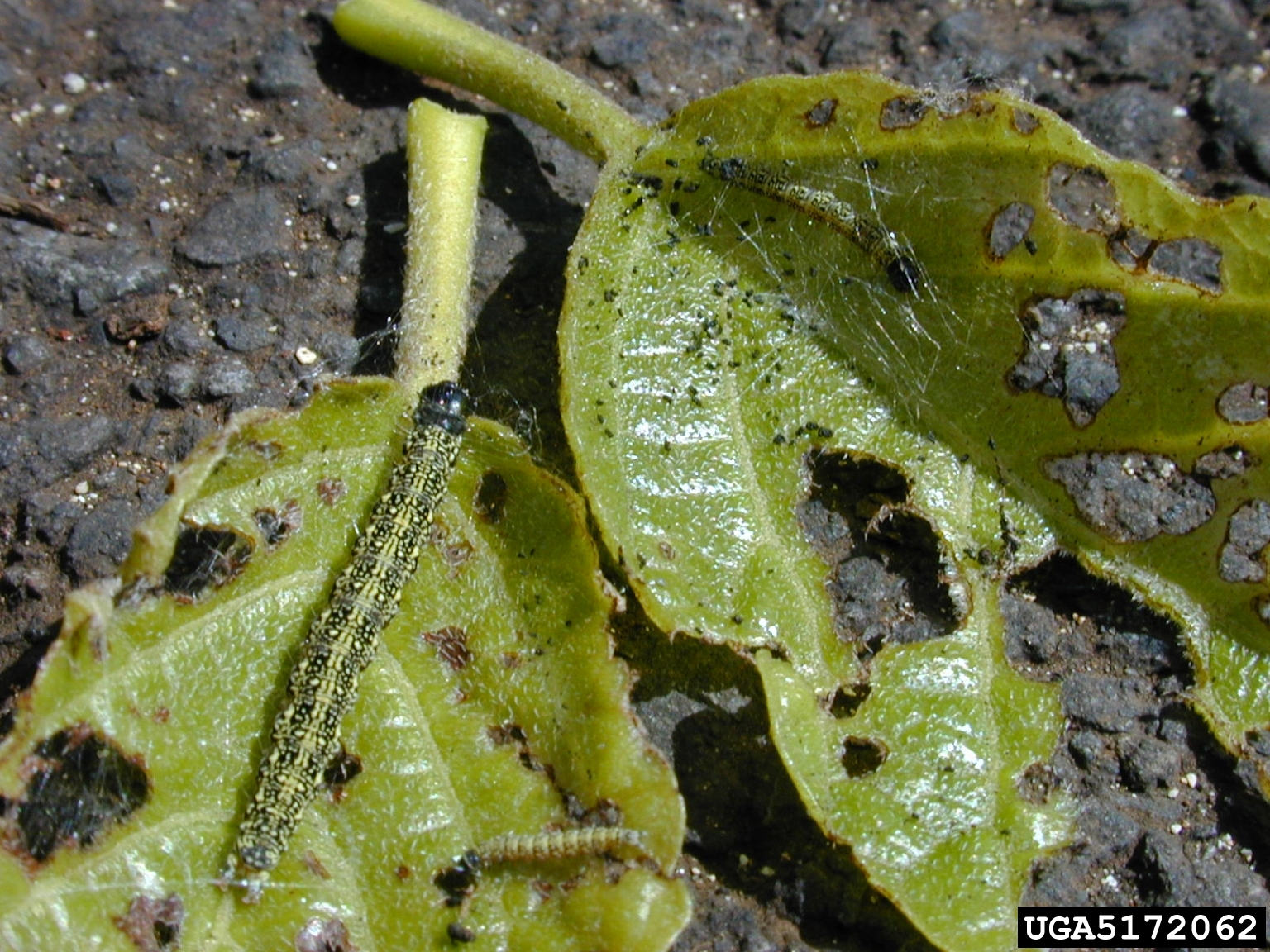
Caterpillar

The wingspan is 24–28 mm (0.94–1.10 in). The forewings are overlaid with fifteen black dots on a grey background and a row of seven marginal dots. The hindwings are orange-yellow, but the apical patch is dark brown and covers one-seventh of the hindwing.

The larvae feed on Ehretia species (including Ehretia dicksoni var. japonica, Ehretia laevis and Ehretia buxifolia), as well as on Cordia subcordata and Cordia sebestena.

This moth figures on a 25-cent stamp of Kiribati from 1980.
