= Dialectica geometra =

Scientific classification
- Kingdom: Animalia
- Phylum: Arthropoda
- Class: Insecta
- Order: Lepidoptera
- Family: Gracillariidae
- Genus: Dialectica
- Species: D. geometra

Binomial name
- Dialectica geometra (Meyrick, 1916)

Synonyms
- Acrocercops geometra Meyrick, 1916

Species of moth

Dialectica geometra is a moth of the family Gracillariidae. It is known from Hong Kong, Japan (the Ryukyu Islands), India (West Bengal, Tamil Nadu, Bihar, Delhi and Uttar Pradesh) and Réunion. It has recently been recorded from China.

The wingspan is 6.5–8.2 mm.

The larvae feed on Cordia amplifolia, Cordia myxa, Ehretia laevis and Ehretia species, including Ehretia microphylla. They mine the leaves of their host plant.
