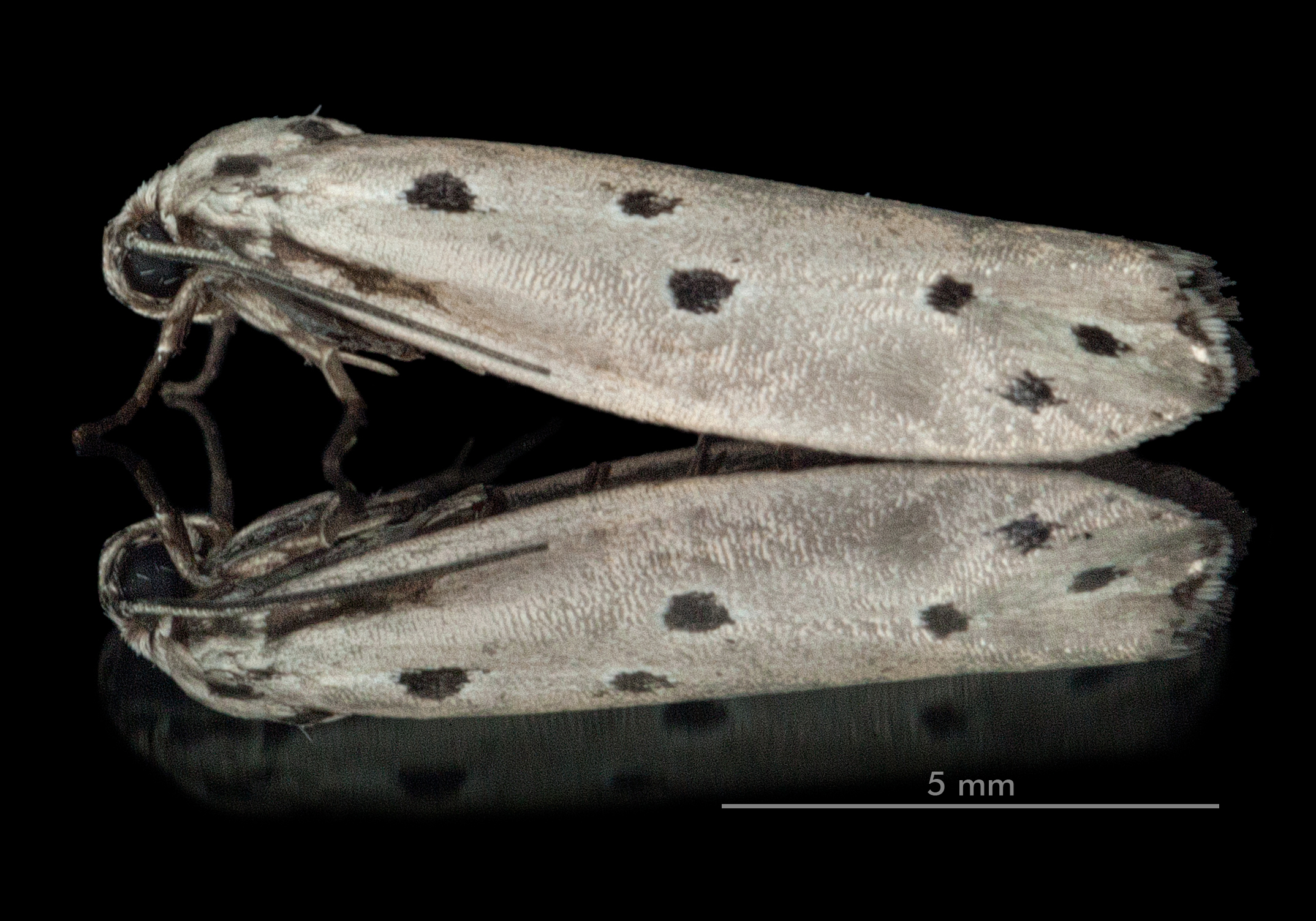

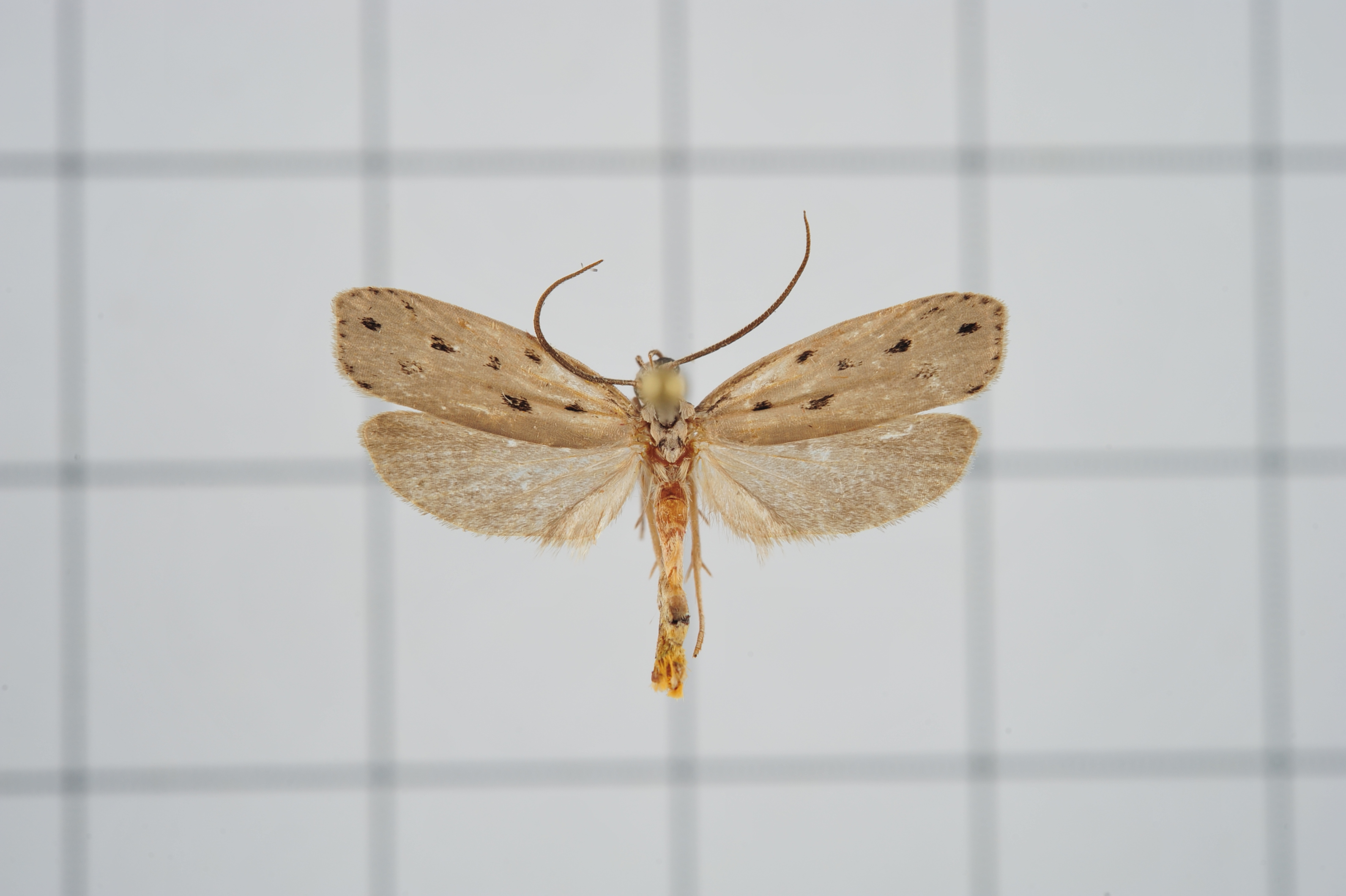

Scientific classification
- Kingdom: Animalia
- Phylum: Arthropoda
- Class: Insecta
- Order: Lepidoptera
- Family: Depressariidae
- Genus: Ethmia
- Species: E. octanoma

Binomial name
- Ethmia octanoma Meyrick, 1914

= Ethmia octanoma =

Species of moth

Ethmia octanoma is a moth in the family Depressariidae. It is endemic to Taiwan.

The wingspan is 20–23 mm (0.79–0.91 in).

The larvae feed on Ehretia resinosa and Ehretia dicksonii.
