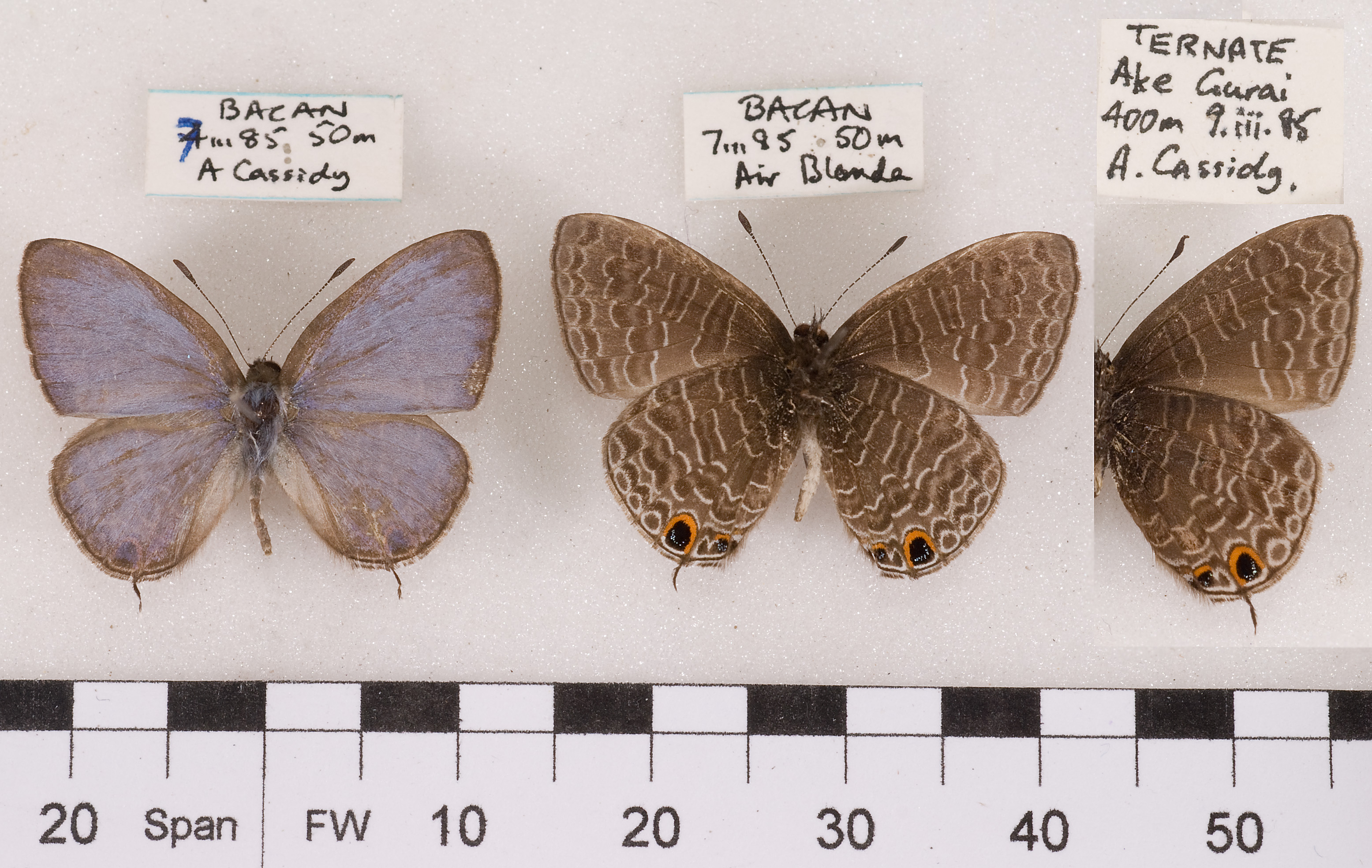

Scientific classification
- Domain: Eukaryota
- Kingdom: Animalia
- Phylum: Arthropoda
- Class: Insecta
- Order: Lepidoptera
- Family: Lycaenidae
- Genus: Erysichton
- Species: E. lineatus

Binomial name
- Erysichton lineatus (Murray, 1874)

Synonyms
- Erysichton lineata (Murray, 1874); Lycaena lineata Murray, 1874; Nacaduba palmyra cythora Fruhstorfer, 1916; Nacaduba palmyra eugenea Fruhstorfer, 1916; Nacaduba valentina Grose-Smith, 1895; Plebeius meiranganus Röber, 1886; Plebeius fatureus Röber, 1886; Nacaduba palmyra vaneeckei Fruhstorfer, 1916; Nacaduba palmyra thadmor Fruhstorfer, 1916; Nacaduba meiranganus var. uluensis Ribbe, 1899; Nacaduba vincula Druce, 1891

= Erysichton lineatus =

Species of butterfly

Erysichton lineatus, the hairy line-blue, is a butterfly in the family Lycaenidae. It is the sole species of the genus Erysichton. It was first described by Richard Paget Murray in 1874. It is found in New Guinea and along most of the eastern coast of Australia, from Queensland to New South Wales.

The wingspan is about 20 mm.

The larvae feed on the flowers of Syzygium francisii, Ehretia acuminata, Macadamia integrifolia, Brachychiton acerifolium and Arytera lautereriana.

== Subspecies ==
The following are subspecies of Erysichton lineatus:

- Erysichton lineatus lineatus (Queensland: Claudie River to New South Wales: Kiama)
- Erysichton lineatus cythora (Fruhstorfer, 1916) (Tanimbar, Buru, Ambon, Serang, Obi, Bachan)
- Erysichton lineatus insularis Tite, 1963 (Trobriand, D'Entrecasteaux, Louisiade Archipelago)
- Erysichton lineatus meiranganus (Röber, 1886) (Aru, Kai, Manam, Karka, Admiralty Island)
- Erysichton lineatus uluensis (Ribbe, 1899) (New Britain, New Ireland, New Hanover, Witu, St. Matthias, Squally Islands)
- Erysichton lineatus vincula (Druce, 1891) (Solomons)
