= Erysichthon =

Erysichthon or Erisichthon may refer to:

- Erysichthon of Thessaly, the Aeolid Erysichthon, the son of Triopas
- Erysichthon (son of Cecrops), the Cecropid Erysichthon, the son of Cecrops I
- Erysichthon of Phlegra, the son of Gaia

== See also ==
- Erysichton [sic], a genus of butterfly
