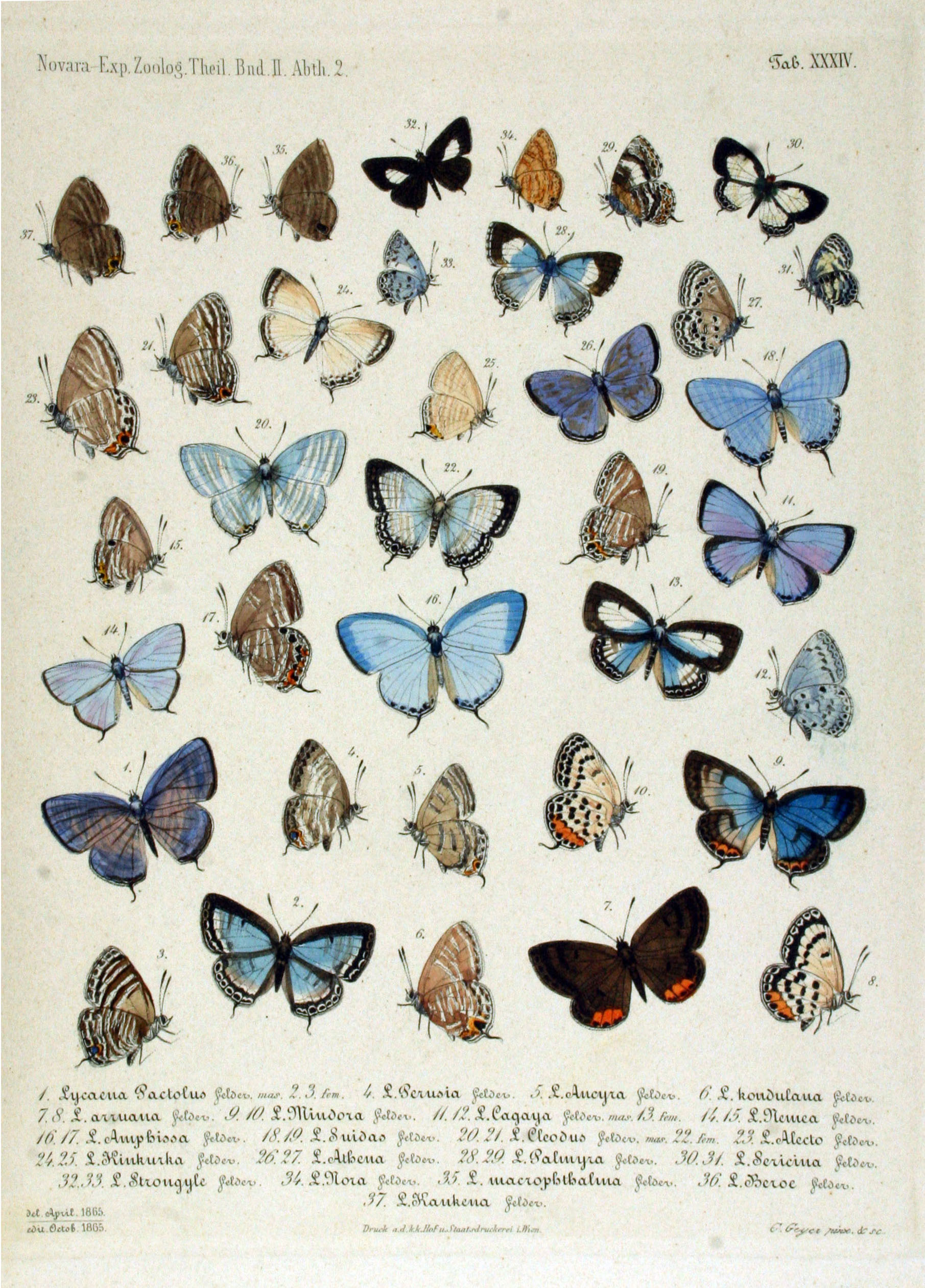
- Erysichton palmyra figures 28 and 29

Scientific classification
- Kingdom: Animalia
- Phylum: Arthropoda
- Clade: Pancrustacea
- Class: Insecta
- Order: Lepidoptera
- Family: Lycaenidae
- Subfamily: Polyommatinae
- Tribe: Polyommatini
- Genus: Erysichton; Fruhstorfer, 1916

= Erysichton =

Butterfly genus in family Lycaenidae

Erysichton is a genus of butterflies in the family Lycaenidae. The species of this genus are found in the Australasian realm.

== Etymology ==
The genus is named after the mythological figure of Erysichthon of Thessaly.

== Species ==
There are up to three recognized species:

- Erysichton albiplaga Tite, 1963
- Erysichton lineatus (Murray, 1874)
- Erysichton palmyra (Felder, 1860)

Some other sources consider Erysichton monotypic, with Erysichton lineatus as the sole species and the remaining species in Jameela.
