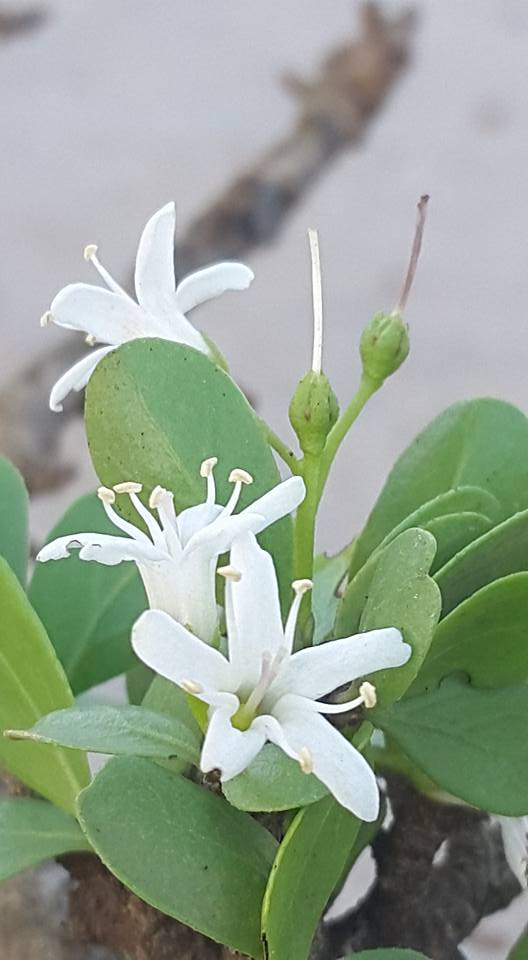
- Habit

Scientific classification
- Kingdom: Plantae
- Clade: Tracheophytes
- Clade: Angiosperms
- Clade: Eudicots
- Clade: Asterids
- Order: Boraginales
- Family: Boraginaceae
- Genus: Ehretia
- Species: E. alba

Binomial name
- Ehretia alba Retief & A.E.van Wyk

= Ehretia alba =

Species of flowering plant

Ehretia alba is a semi-deciduous shrub or small tree up to 4m high, growing in Namibia, Botswana and the western, drier regions of South Africa, and was first collected by Hermann Merxmüller at Breitenberg in the Gobabis district of Namibia. As with other species of Ehretia it is twiggy with rigid branches, its fascicled leaves showing a large variation in size (6-25 x 3-13 mm), with acute or obtuse apices, and appressed setae along margins. Midribs and secondary veins are prominent on the lower surfaces, while the petioles are only 3 mm long. Leaves are generally clustered or fascicled on abbreviated twigs. Flowers are fragrant and white to cream, while unopened buds are mauve. The mature fruit is red and shows a persistent calyx.

Until 2001 E. alba was regarded as simply a form of Ehretia rigida. The authors felt it differed sufficiently and consistently from E. rigida to merit a new taxon:

"Ehretia alba Retief & A.E.van Wyk, sp. nov., E. rigidae (Thunb.) Druce affinis sed sic differt: lobi corollae albi (non malvini indici vel purpurei); carina et venae laterales in pagina inferiora foliorum juvenicumprominentes (venae tertiariea praeterea prominentes); lobi calycis anguste triangulares (non triangulares et ovati)."

— "Ehretia alba, a new species close to E. rigida but differing in white corolla lobes (not mauve or purple); prominent midrib and lateral veins on underside of leaves - tertiary veins also prominent); calyx lobes narrowly triangular (not triangular and ovate)."

TYPE.—Namibia, 2218 (Gobabis): Breitenberg, Gobabis Dist., (-DC). Merxmüller 1071 (WIND, holo.; PRE, iso.).

== Gallery ==
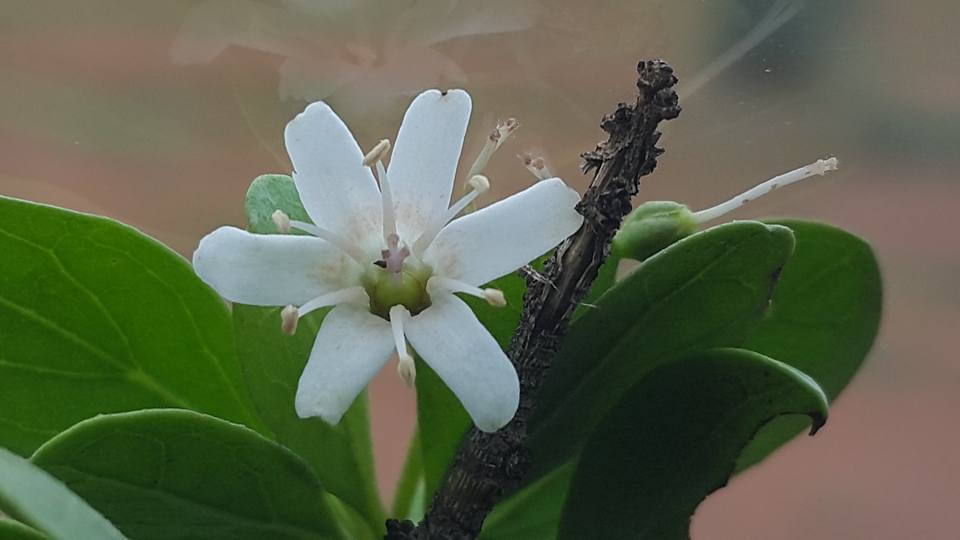

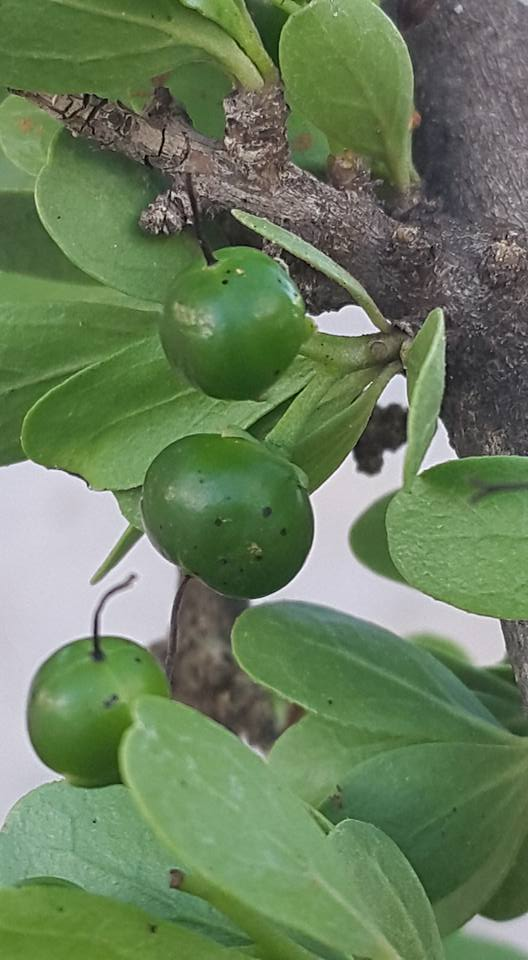
