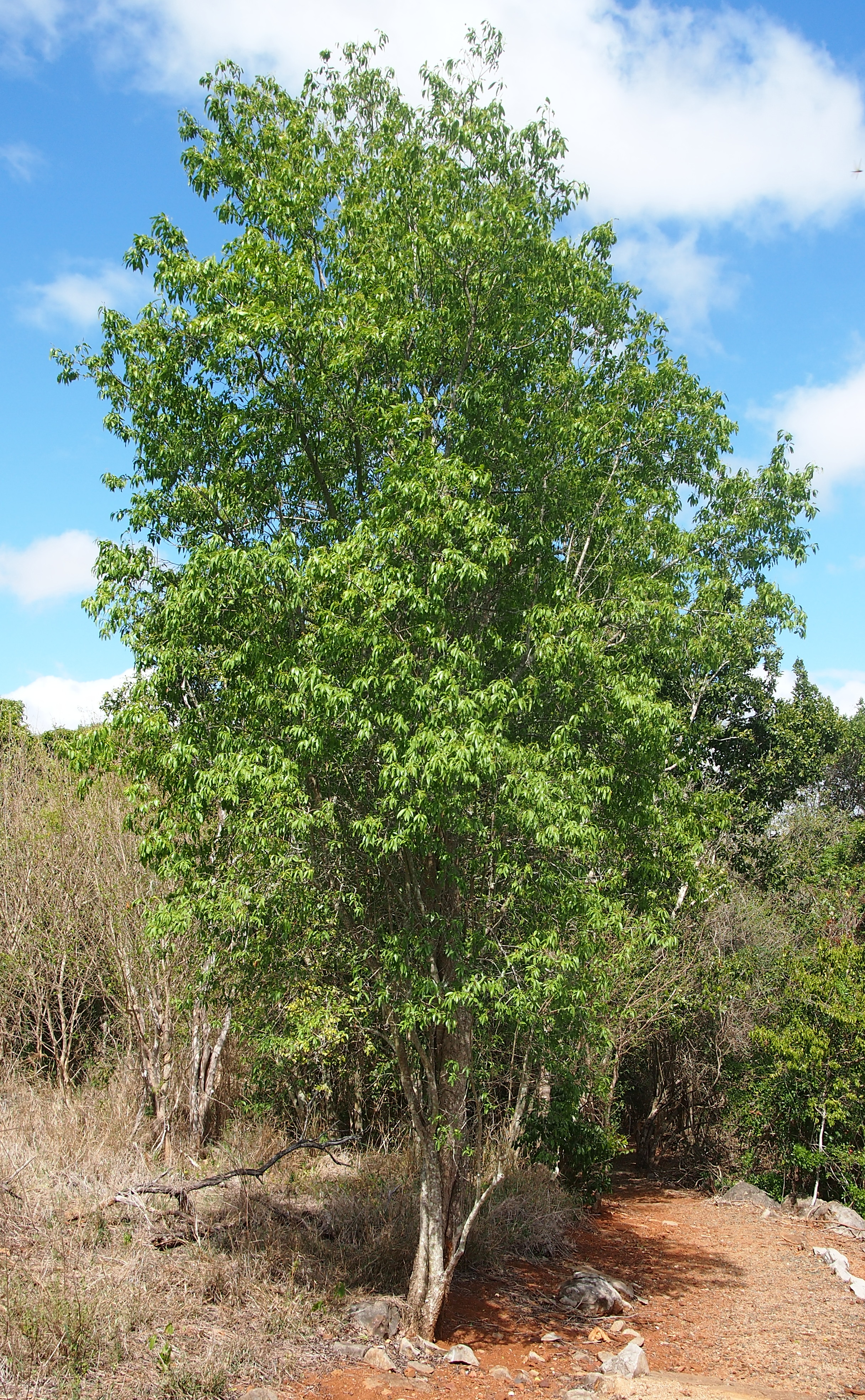
- Ehretia saligna var. membranifolia

Scientific classification
- Kingdom: Plantae
- Clade: Tracheophytes
- Clade: Angiosperms
- Clade: Eudicots
- Clade: Asterids
- Order: Boraginales
- Family: Boraginaceae
- Genus: Ehretia
- Species: E. saligna

Binomial name
- Ehretia saligna R.Br.

Varieties
- Ehretia saligna var. membranifolia (R.Br.) Randell; Ehretia saligna R.Br. var. saligna

= Ehretia saligna =

Species of tree

Ehretia saligna, commonly known as peach bush, native willow and peachwood is a species of shrubs or small trees, endemic to Northern Australia. The natural range extends from the Gascoyne, across the Northern Territory throughout northern Queensland and coastal; regions of Southern Queensland and New South Wales.

Ehretia saligna grows as a shrub or small tree with a weeping habit and simple narrow leaves. Green-white flowers 1-2mm long are produced in panicles in autumn or spring. The flowers are followed by yellow or red fruit, 1 to 4 mm in diameter, containing two to four large seeds. The fruit is edible to humans and was an important food source for Aboriginal Australians, especially in more arid regions. The fruit is also a food source for many bird species.

Ehretia saligna grows in an extremely wide range of environments, from tropical rainforest and marshland to hot desert regions. It shows a similarly large degree of variation in leaf type, flower structure and growth habit. This variability has led to its being described as at least two distinct species: E. membranifolia and E. saligna. These former species are now considered varieties, despite intergrading completely.

Ehretia saligna var. membranifolia is restricted to The Northern Territory, North Queensland and coastal regions of Central Queensland southwards to coastal regions of northern New South Wales. It occurs almost exclusively in moister, more heavily wooded environments, including monsoon forest, littoral rainforest and the margins of lowland rainforest. In keeping with its more mesic environment, it has a larger growth form, commonly occurring as a small tree up to 6 metres tall, with relatively broad leaves, approximately 4 times as long as broad.

Ehretia saligna var. saligna is largely a plant of more arid regions and open forests and woodlands, although it is occasionally found in monsoon forest. This form has a much wider range than E. saligna var. membranifolia, and occurs in coastal Western Australia, across both arid and coastal arid regions of the Northern Territory and Queensland. Although it can grow to 6 metres in height, it is more commonly encountered as a shrub 2–4 metres tall. Leaves are comparatively narrow, commonly 8-10 times as long as broad.

The plant is a moderately important browse species for cattle and sheep, especially in times of drought. In addition to consuming the fruit, Aborigines used a decoction of the wood for pain relief. Although slow growing, it is also occasionally planted as a foliage tree.

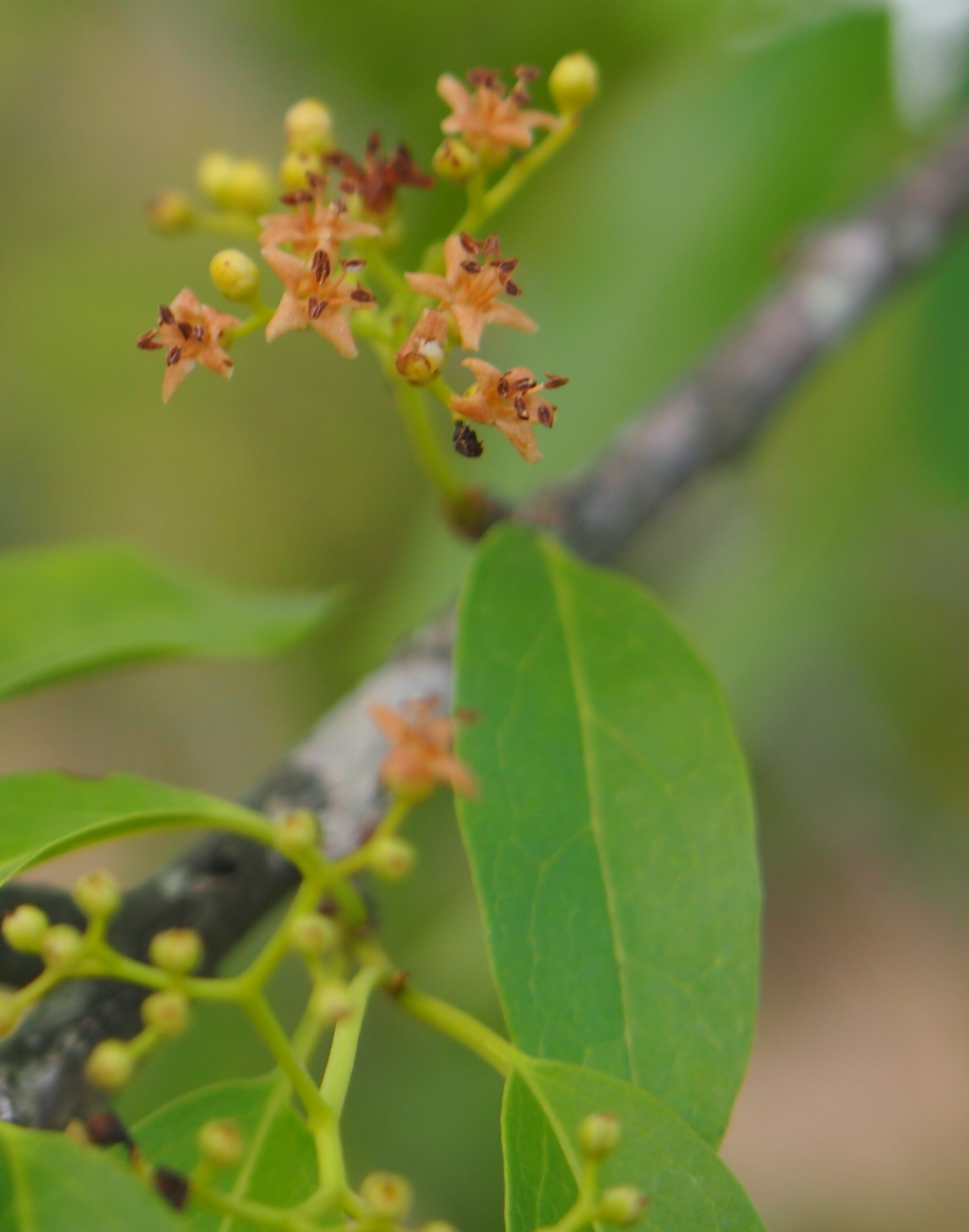
E. saligna var. membranifolia flowers. Note that these flowers are at the end of their lifespan. The brown colouration is not normal for live flowers, which are green-white.
