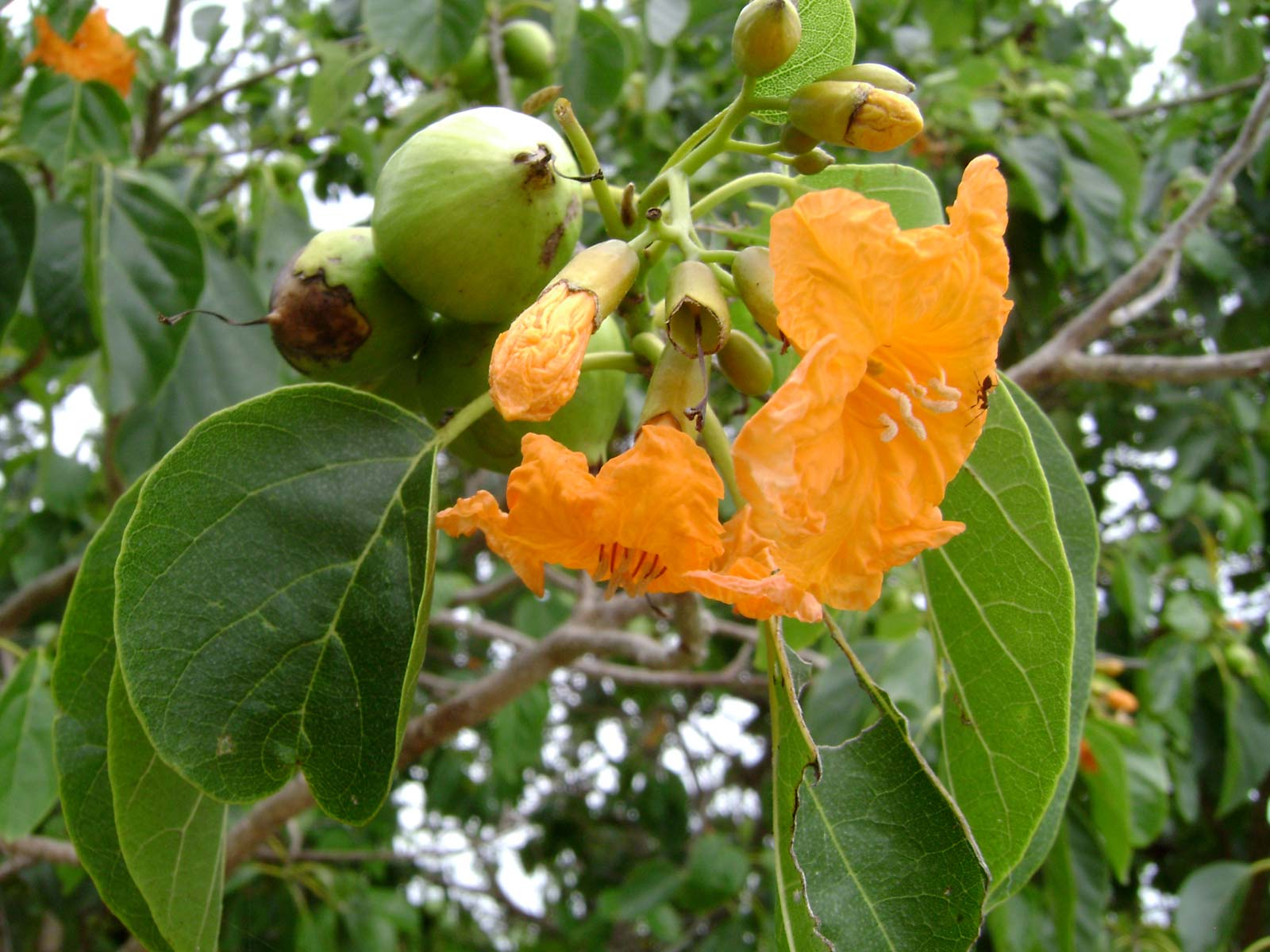
- Flower and fruit

Conservation status
- Least Concern (IUCN 3.1)

Scientific classification
- Kingdom: Plantae
- Clade: Tracheophytes
- Clade: Angiosperms
- Clade: Eudicots
- Clade: Asterids
- Order: Boraginales
- Family: Cordiaceae
- Genus: Cordia
- Species: C. subcordata

Binomial name
- Cordia subcordata Lam.

Synonyms
- 18 synonyms: Lithocardium subcordatum (Lam.) Kuntze; Cordia banalo Blanco; Cordia campanulata Roxb.; Cordia hexandra Roem. & Schult.; Cordia ignota Blanco; Cordia moluccana Roxb.; Cordia octandra A.DC.; Cordia orientalis R.Br.; Cordia prionodes Voigt; Cordia rumphii Blume; Cordia sebestena G.Forst.; Cordia serrata Roxb.; Gerascanthus moluccanus (Roxb.) Borhidi; Lithocardium moluccanum (Roxb.) Kuntze; Lithocardium octandrum (A.DC.) Kuntze; Lithocardium serratum Kuntze; Novella nigra Raf.; Sebestena rumphii (Blume) J.Presl

= Cordia subcordata =

Species of tree

Cordia subcordata is a species of flowering tree in the family Cordiaceae. It can be found growing in eastern Africa, South Asia, Southeast Asia, northern Australia and the Pacific Islands. The plant is known by a variety of names, including kou, beach cordia, sea trumpet, and kerosene wood.

== Description ==
Cordia subcordata often grows to about 7–10 m (23–33 ft), but can reach up to 15 m (49 ft). It has ovate leaves that are 8–20 cm (3.1–7.9 in) and 5–13 cm (2.0–5.1 in) wide with short hairs on the upper surface.

=== Flowers and fruit ===
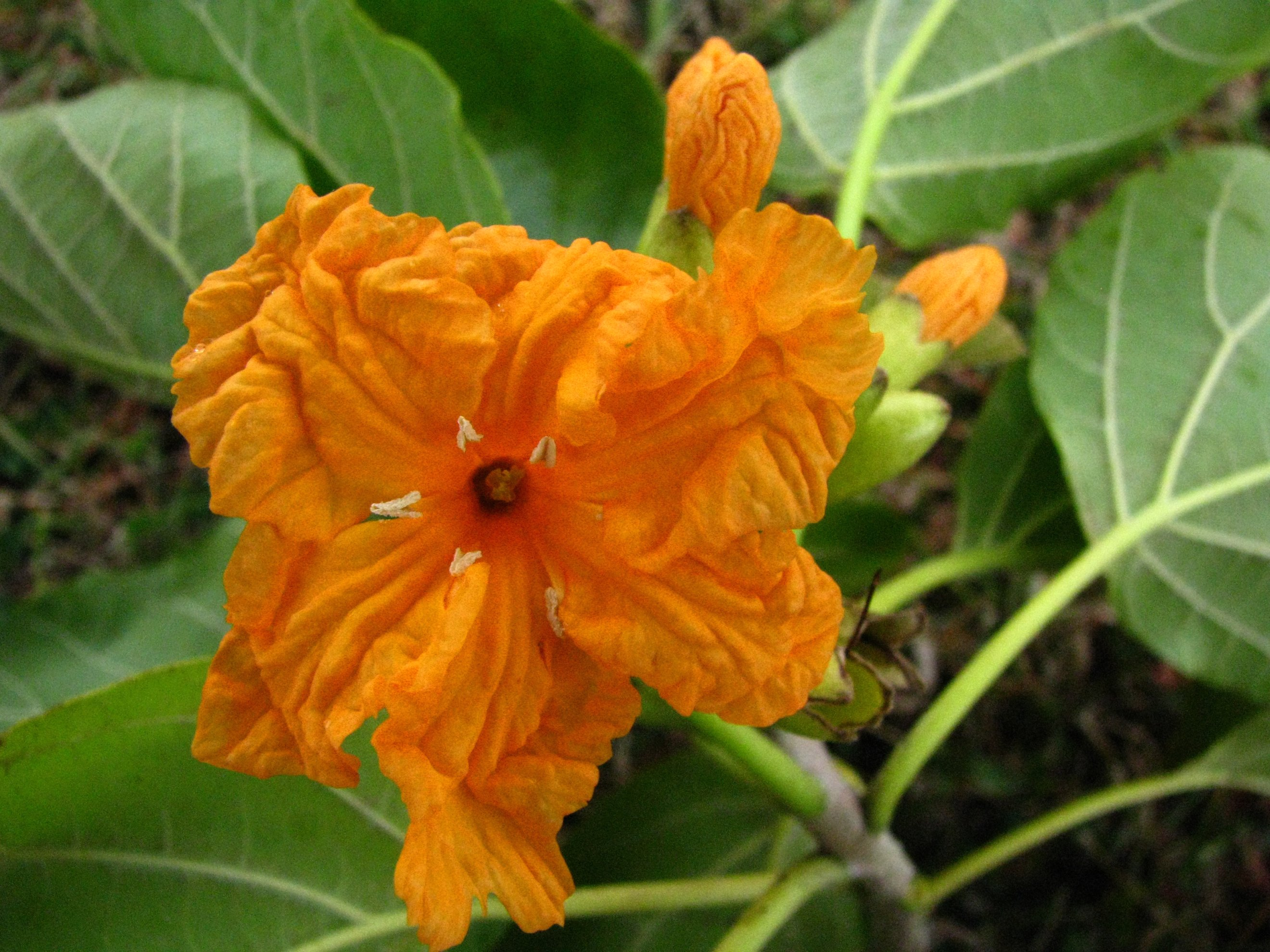
Closeup of kou flower.

Blooming occurs throughout the year, but most flowers are produced in the spring. The flowers are funnel- or tube-shaped 1–2 cm (0.39–0.79 in) long and 0.4–0.8 cm (0.16–0.31 in) in diameter, with orange petals and pale green sepals. The flowers are produced in cymes or panicles.

The fruit are spherical 2–3 cm (0.79–1.18 in) long, brown, and woody when mature, and are produced all year round. Each fruit contains up to four seeds that are 10–13 mm (0.39–0.51 in) long. The fruit are buoyant and may be carried very far by ocean currents.

== Distribution and habitat ==
C. subcordata has a very wide range from the east coast of Africa east throughout tropical Asia and Oceania, as far as Hawaii. This distribution arose from the special characteristics of its fruit, which allowed successful oceanic dispersal. Prior to 2001, C. subcordata was considered to be a Polynesian introduction to Hawaii by many authorities, but subfossil evidence from Makauwahi Cave in Kauai indicates that it was an abundant species in Hawaiian lowland forests well before humans arrived, confirming its status as an indigenous species.

The species is found along coasts at elevations from sea level to 30 m (98 ft) that receive 1,000–4,000 mm (39–157 in) of annual rainfall. They prefer neutral to alkaline soils (pH of 6.1 to 7.4), such as those originating from basalt, limestone, clay, or sand. Allowable soil textures include sand, sandy loam, loam, sandy clay loam, sandy clay, clay loam, and clay. It can also grow on the margins of rocky shores and mangrove swamps.

== Conservation ==
Despite its very wide distribution, this species faces threats in parts of its range. During the late 19th century, herbivory by the kou moth (Ethmia nigroapicella) nearly wiped out this species on the Hawaiian Islands. It is thought to be highly endangered in Sri Lanka, only persisting at a small number of sites that are under pressure from development. Logging of mature trees to create carvings for the tourism industry is also thought to be a threat throughout much of Papuasia. As a purely coastal tree, it may in addition potentially be threatened by storms and sea level rise.

== Uses ==
The seeds are edible and have been eaten during famine.

The wood of the tree has a specific gravity of 0.45, is soft, durable, easily worked, and resistant to termites. In ancient Hawaiʻi kou wood was used to make ʻumeke (bowls), utensils, and ʻumeke lāʻau (large calabashes) because it did not impart a foul taste to food. ʻUmeke lāʻau were 8–16 litres (2–4 gal) and used to store and ferment poi. Kou was also used to carve kiʻi ('religious images'). The wood burns readily, and this led to the nickname of "kerosene tree" in Papua New Guinea. The flowers were used to make lei, while a dye for kapa cloth and aho (fishing lines) was derived from the leaves. Fijians obtain fibre to make baskets and garlands from its inner bark by soaking it in seawater.

In the western Solomon Islands, in Vanuatu, on Waya Island, and in Tonga, it is used for carving. On New Ireland, its wood is always used for the ceremonial entrances to men's houses.

== Regional names ==
Other names for the species include kanawa, tou, mareer, manjak, snottygobbles, glueberry, and narrow-leafed bird lime tree. In Java and Madura, it is known as kalimasada, purnamasada, or pramasada; Javanese folklore considers the tree to contain spiritual power. In the Marshall Islands it is known as kono. In Fiji, it is called nawanawa.

== Gallery ==
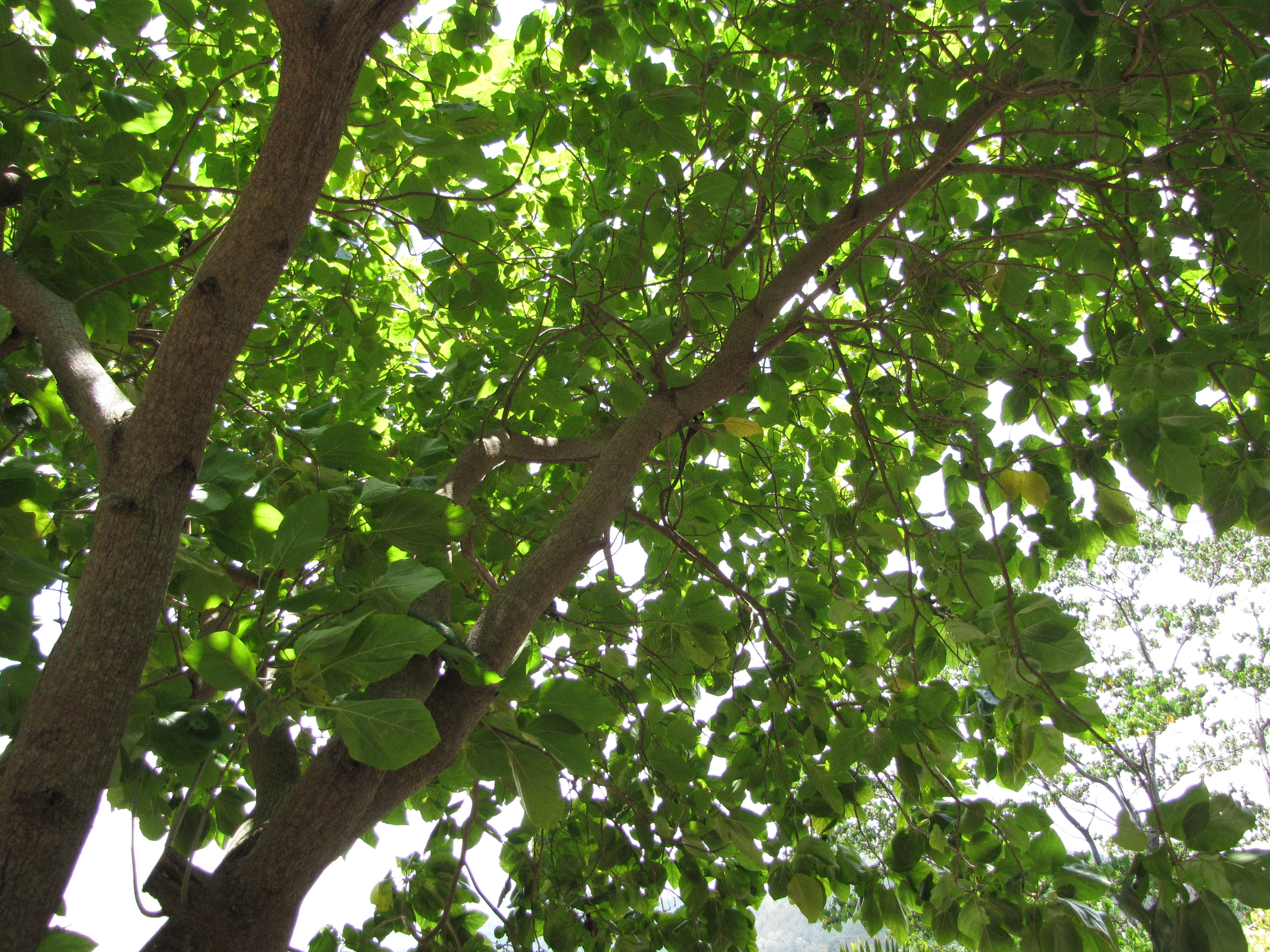
Maui, Hawaii

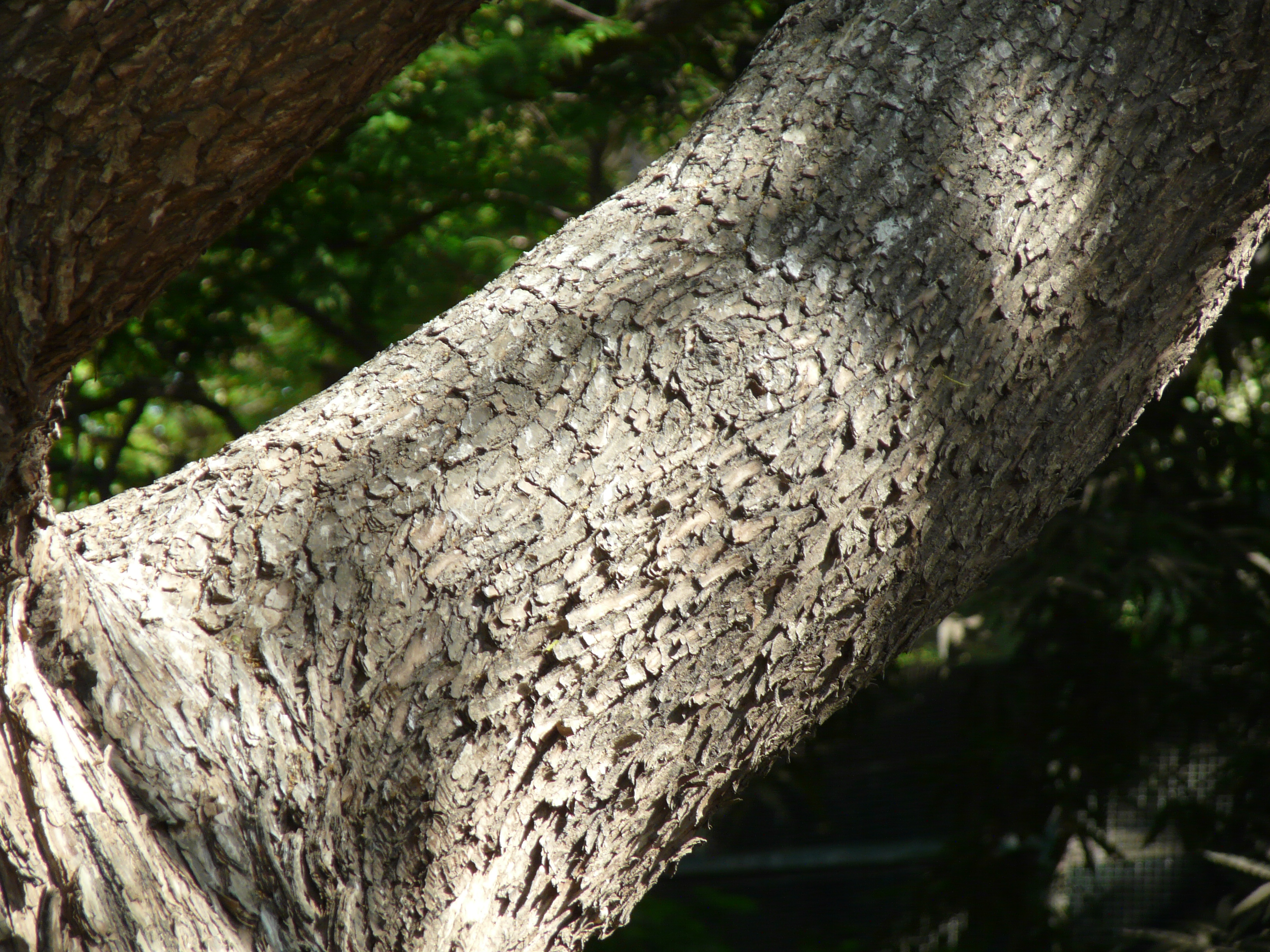
Bark of branch

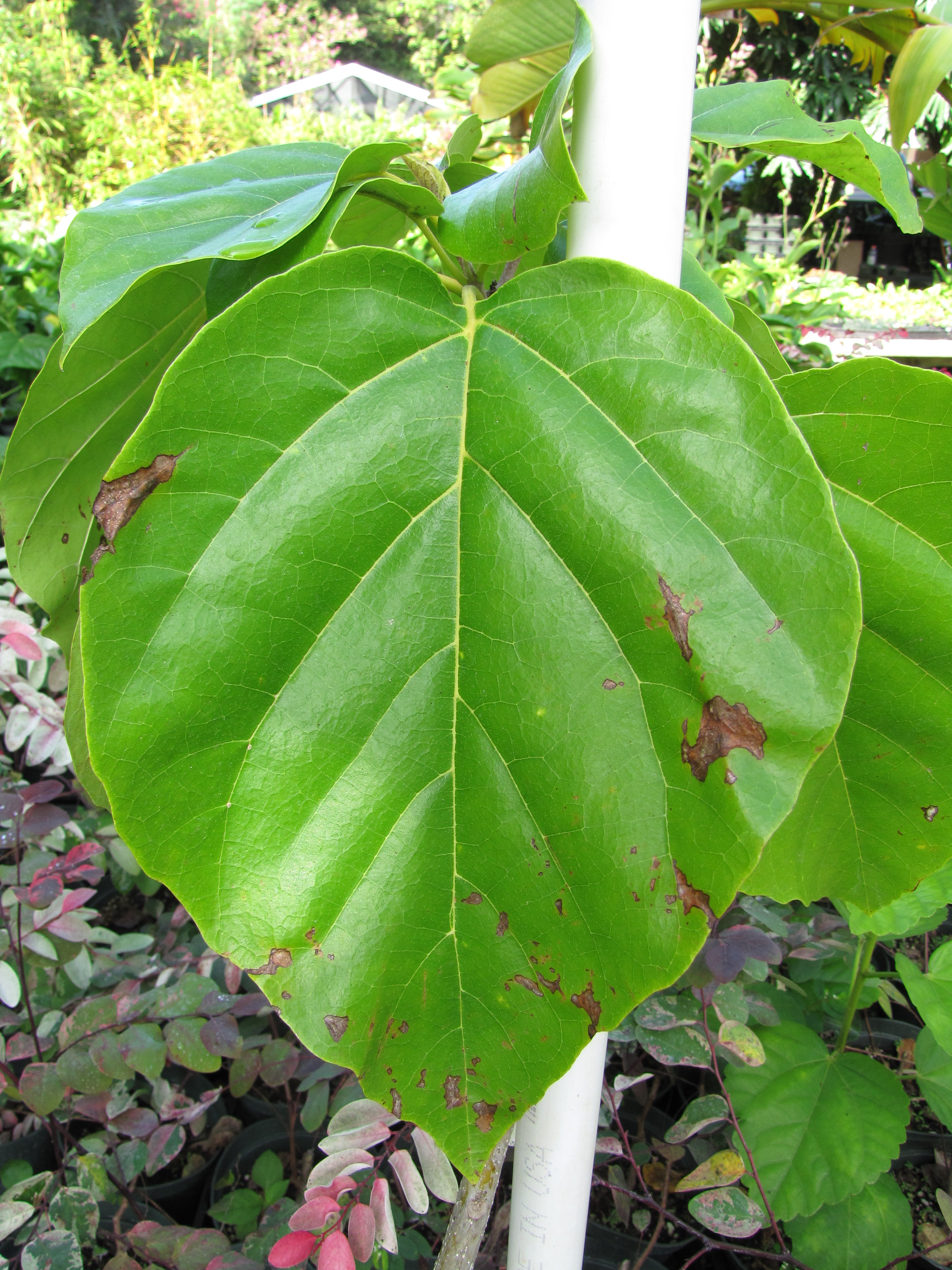
Leaf

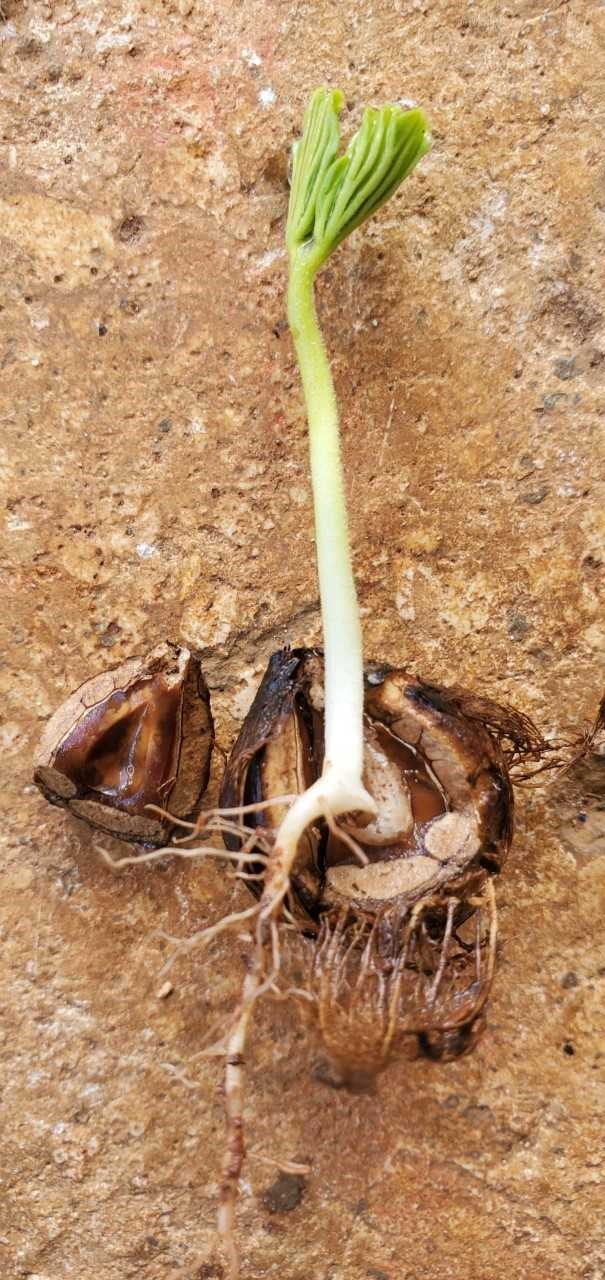
Seedling

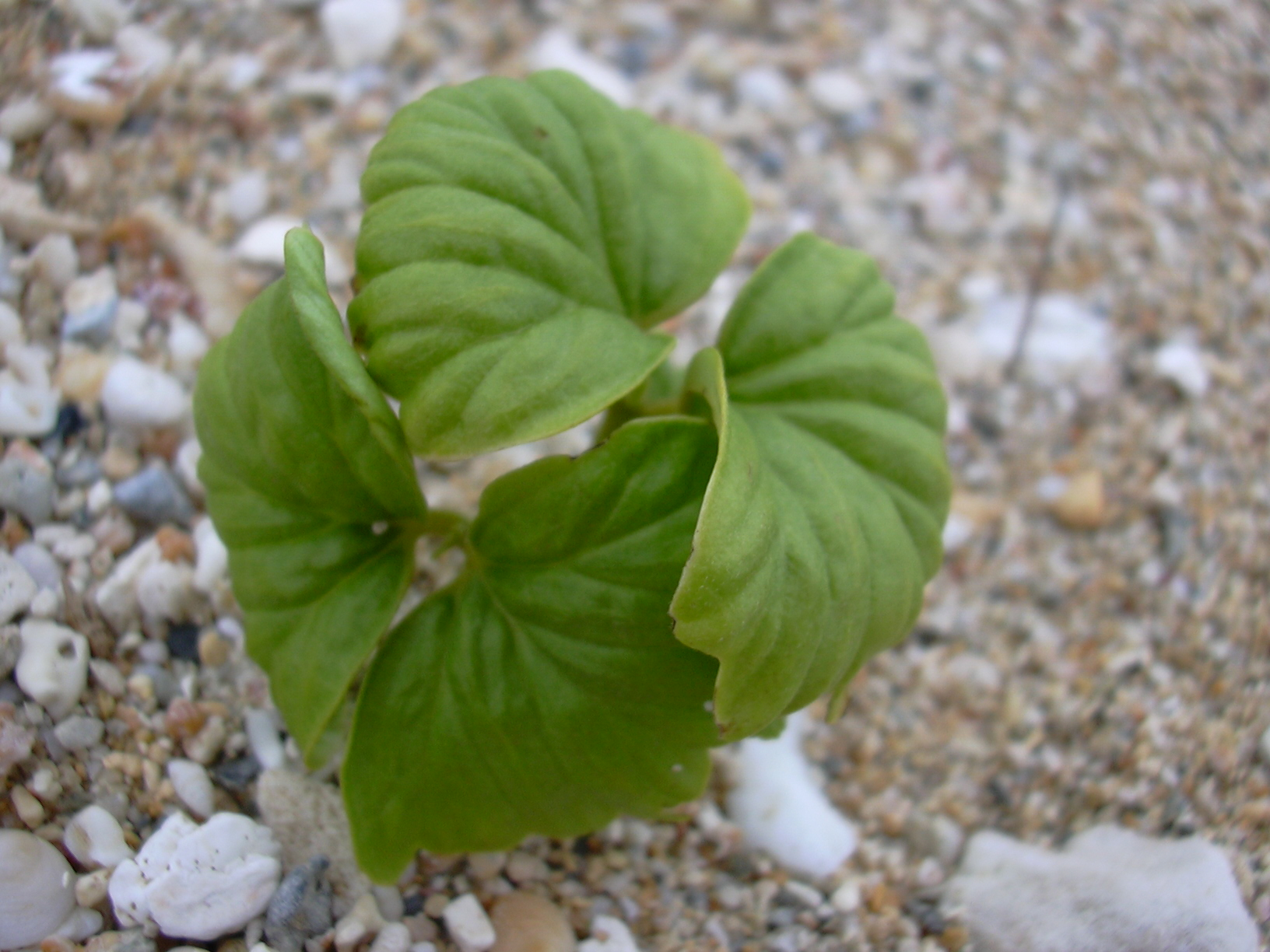
Seedling

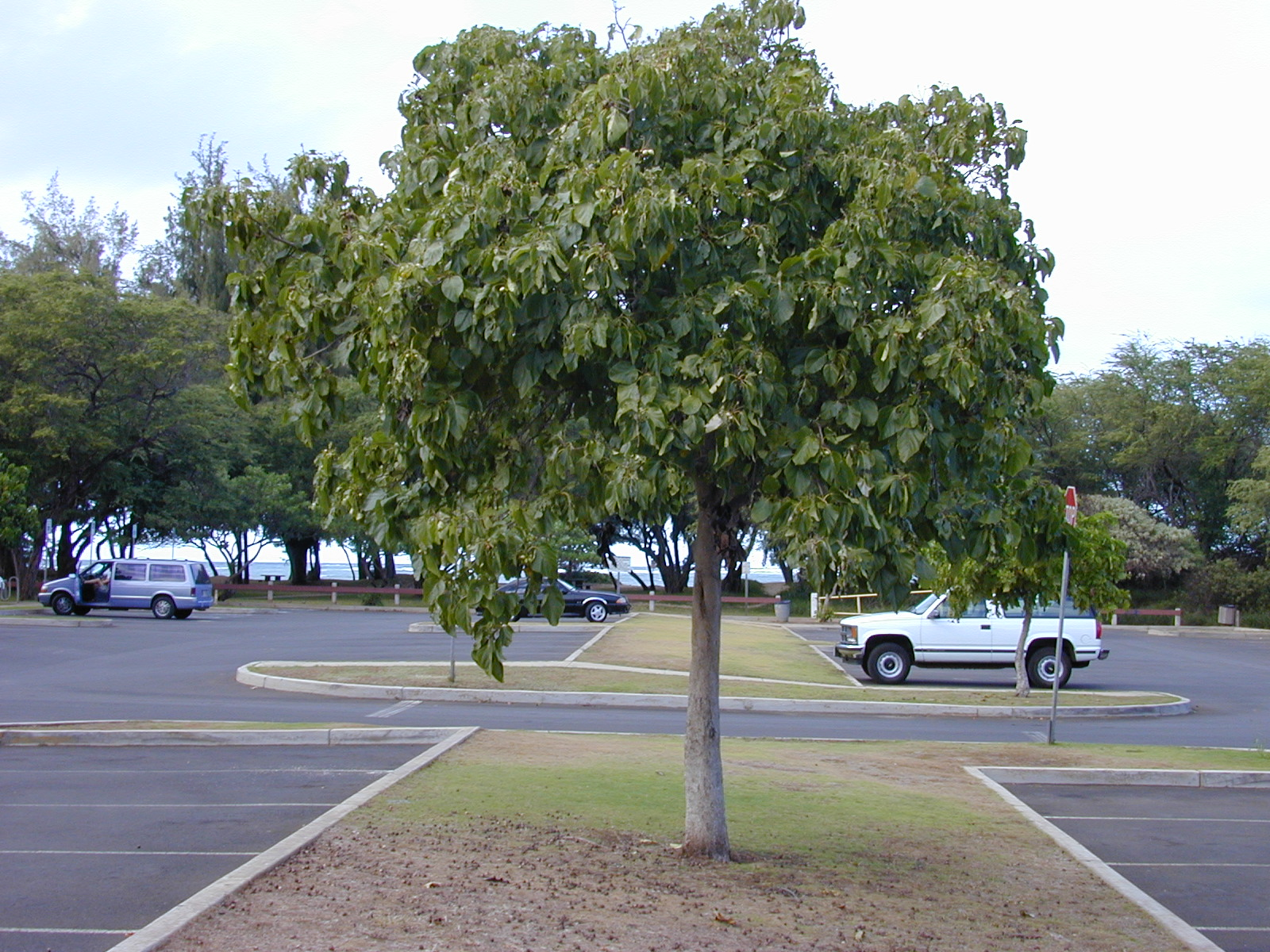
Mature tree used for landscaping

== See also ==
- Domesticated plants and animals of Austronesia
- Tamatou, a doll carved out of Cordia subcordata wood which reigned as king of Tonga for three years
