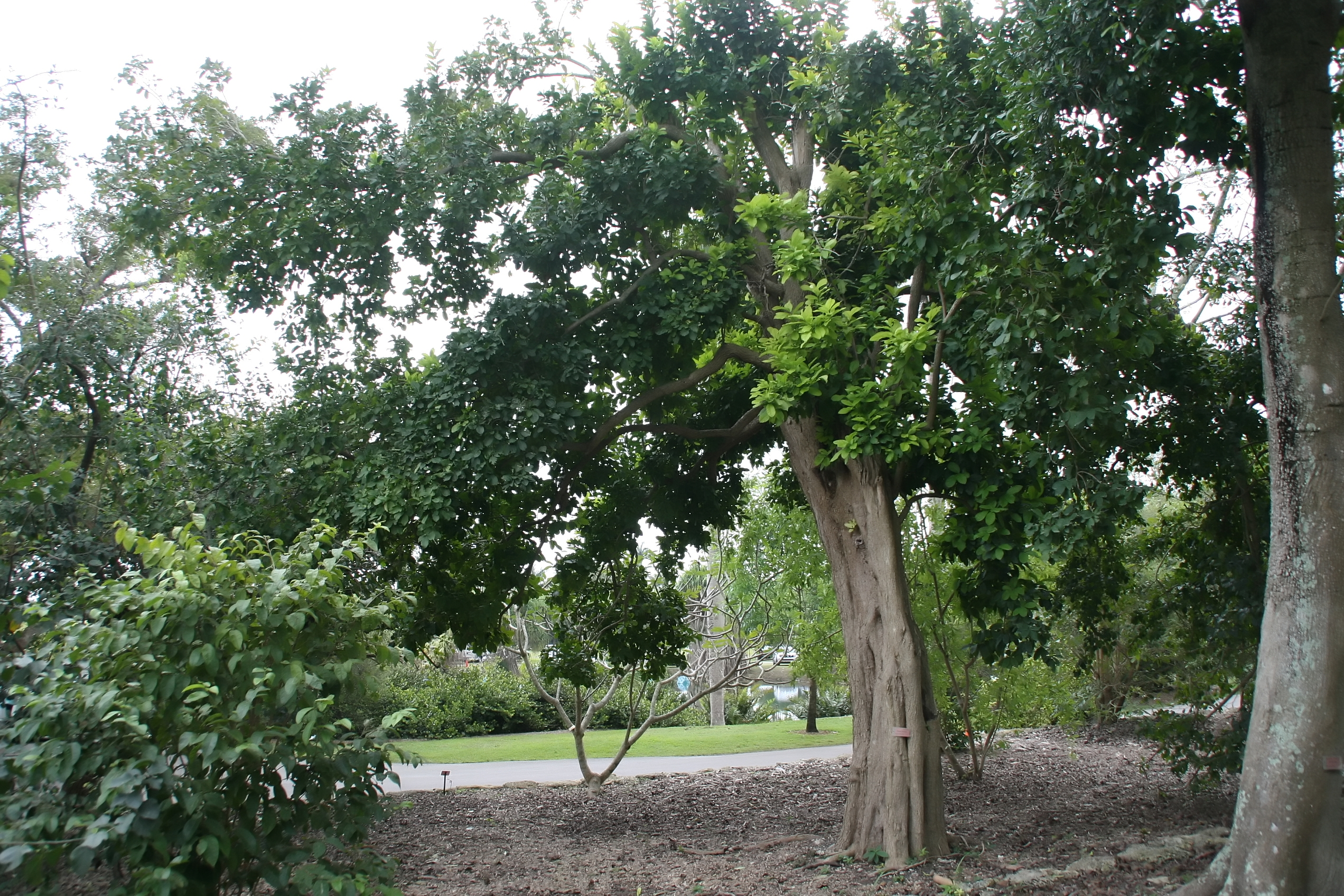

Scientific classification
- Kingdom: Plantae
- Clade: Tracheophytes
- Clade: Angiosperms
- Clade: Eudicots
- Clade: Asterids
- Order: Boraginales
- Family: Boraginaceae
- Genus: Ehretia
- Species: E. tinifolia

Binomial name
- Ehretia tinifolia L.

= Ehretia tinifolia =

Species of tree

Ehretia tinifolia is a woody, perennial tree, usually 0.5 to 3 m in height, branched from the base, from reddish-brown to red-purple bark, exfoliating (the outer bark opens and peels off like a sheet of paper); The leaves are coriaceous, elliptic, from 1 to 3.3 cm long. The flower is urceolate, white to Mexican pink and grouped in clusters of five to eight flowers. The plant can reproduce vegetatively from branches that are buried, but this type of reproduction is rare.

== Fruit ==
The fruit is a depressed, smooth sphere, approximately 5 to 8mm, fleshy and edible. Mature at the end of spring or late summer. When ripe it is yellow. The fruits are consumed by bears, coyotes, foxes, rabbits, rodents, wild turkeys and even by ants. The seeds, numbered 4 to 7, have hardened teguments (ossicle form) and sometimes remain joined in groups of two to three.

== Distribution and habitat ==
Typically found in Mexico, southeastern USA and some Central American and Caribbean countries. It is distributed from the southern United States to Veracruz and Oaxaca, in many types of vegetation and in a wide altitudinal range, ranging from 1375 to 3230 meters above sea level and can be found in all the mountainous and cold areas of Mexico. In Tlaxcala it was very common in Calpulalpan and Tlaxco but its collection has reduced its wild populations.

== Medicinal properties ==
For their therapeutic action they use their fruits and leaves; These contain tannin, gallic acid resin, and a glucoside, arbutin, which has diuretic (facilitates urine) properties. It also manages to remove the inflammation in the cold of the bladder and the bronchi. It is Hydroquinone (quinol), a breakdown product of arbutin that suppresses the fermentation of urine and into the bladder. The fruits are more used than the leaves. In acute bronchitis, it is possible to reduce the expectoration and improve the result are added to the expectoration of penicillium, eucalyptus leaves and borage. The chewed leaves are applied to sores and headaches, for stomach pain and cramps, infused are used to treat severe colds and diarrhea.

Commonly used for its diuretic action, for kidney stones, inflammation or infection in the urinary tract, prostatitis and edema. Its therapeutic uses are similar to the European Grape-ursi. Sweet and sour fruits are also used to make alcoholic beverages, liqueurs, syrups and jams as well as to flavor soups. A brownish-yellow dye is obtained from the leaves and does not require a mordant to attach to the fabric.

Precautions should be made to confuse this with the piracanto or manzanita that is used as an ornamental plant in public and private gardens, the green and mature fruits of this plant become toxic.
