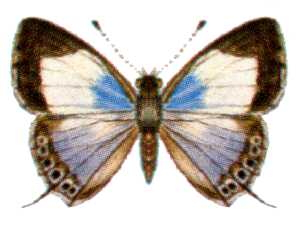
- Jameela palmyra

Scientific classification
- Kingdom: Animalia
- Phylum: Arthropoda
- Clade: Pancrustacea
- Class: Insecta
- Order: Lepidoptera
- Family: Lycaenidae
- Subfamily: Polyommatinae
- Tribe: Polyommatini
- Genus: Jameela; Grund & Eastwood, 2010

= Jameela =

Genus of butterflies

Jameela is a genus of butterflies in the family Lycaenidae. It was split off from Erysichton in 2010, with some sources not recognizing that change. The species of this genus are found in the Australasian realm.

== Species ==
There are two recognized species:

- Jameela albiplaga Tite, 1963
- Jameela palmyra (Felder, 1860) (type species)
