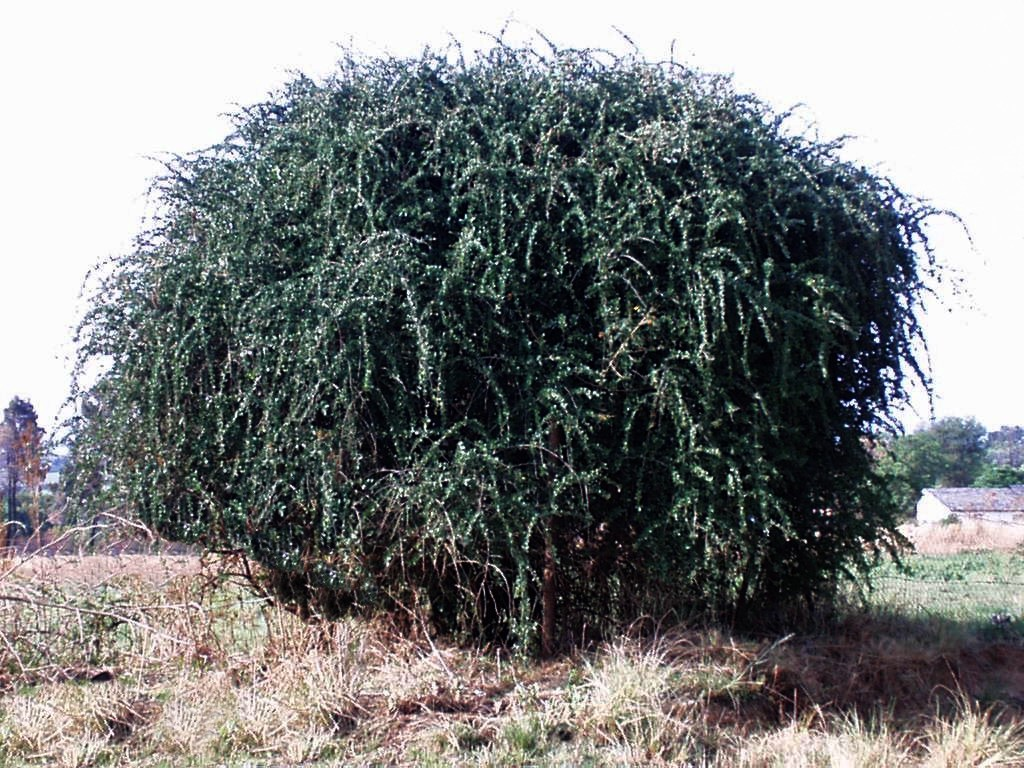
- Habit

Scientific classification
- Kingdom: Plantae
- Clade: Tracheophytes
- Clade: Angiosperms
- Clade: Eudicots
- Clade: Asterids
- Order: Boraginales
- Family: Ehretiaceae
- Genus: Ehretia
- Species: E. rigida

Binomial name
- Ehretia rigida (Thunb.) Druce

= Ehretia rigida =

Species of tree

Ehretia rigida (puzzle bush, also deurmekaarbos in Afrikaans = "confused/tangled bush"), is a small, multi-stemmed tree with a tangled growth habit belonging to the family Ehretiaceae. It occurs over a wide range of habitat throughout the eastern part of South Africa, and in Namibia, Botswana, Zimbabwe and Mozambique.

The species is deciduous, hardy and normally grows to about 5 meters tall. Branches are quite rigid, hence its specific name. Leaves are in tufts, leathery and rough with adpressed minute barbs along the margins. Almost invariably there are small pockets of hairs or acarodomatia, providing a refuge for mites in the axils of veins on the underside of the leaves. Bark is smooth and uniformly ash-grey, becoming rough on older stems. Fragrant lilac-coloured to white flowers are produced in early spring and are followed by small 8mm diameter fruits bearing a persistent style, green at first, turning orange, red and finally black. Seeds are some 3 millimeters in length, reniform and sculpted on the abaxial surface. Each fruit contains 4 seeds.

The genus honours the botanist Georg Dionysius Ehret, a celebrated botanist and botanical illustrator of the 18th century.

== Gallery ==
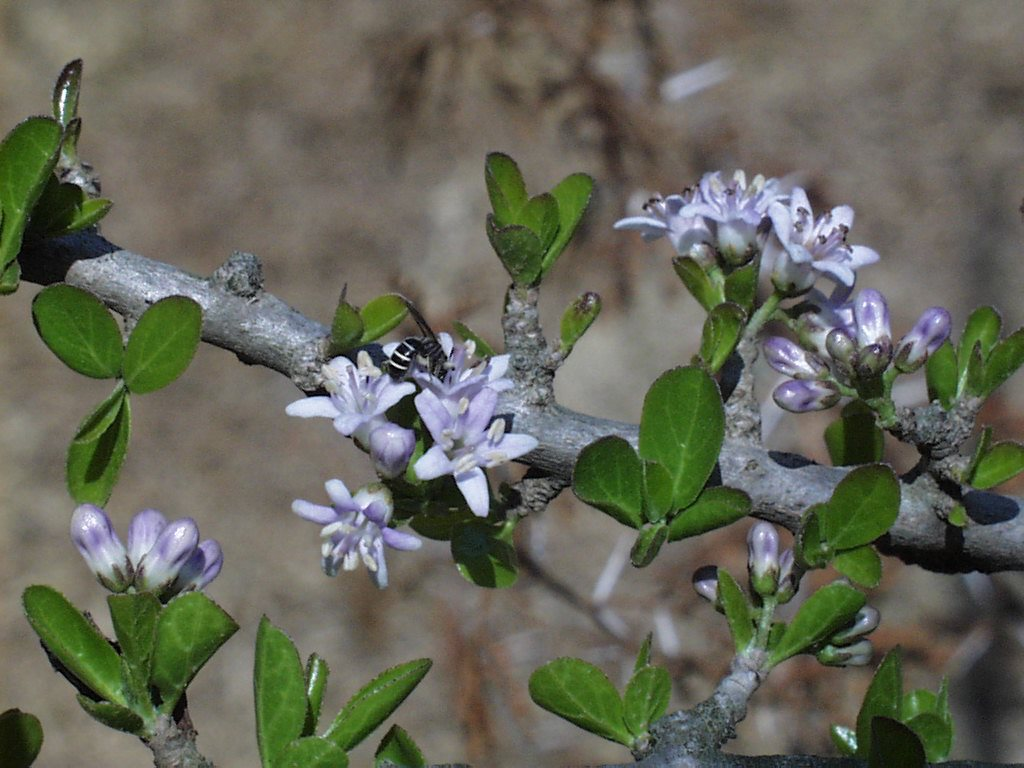
In flower

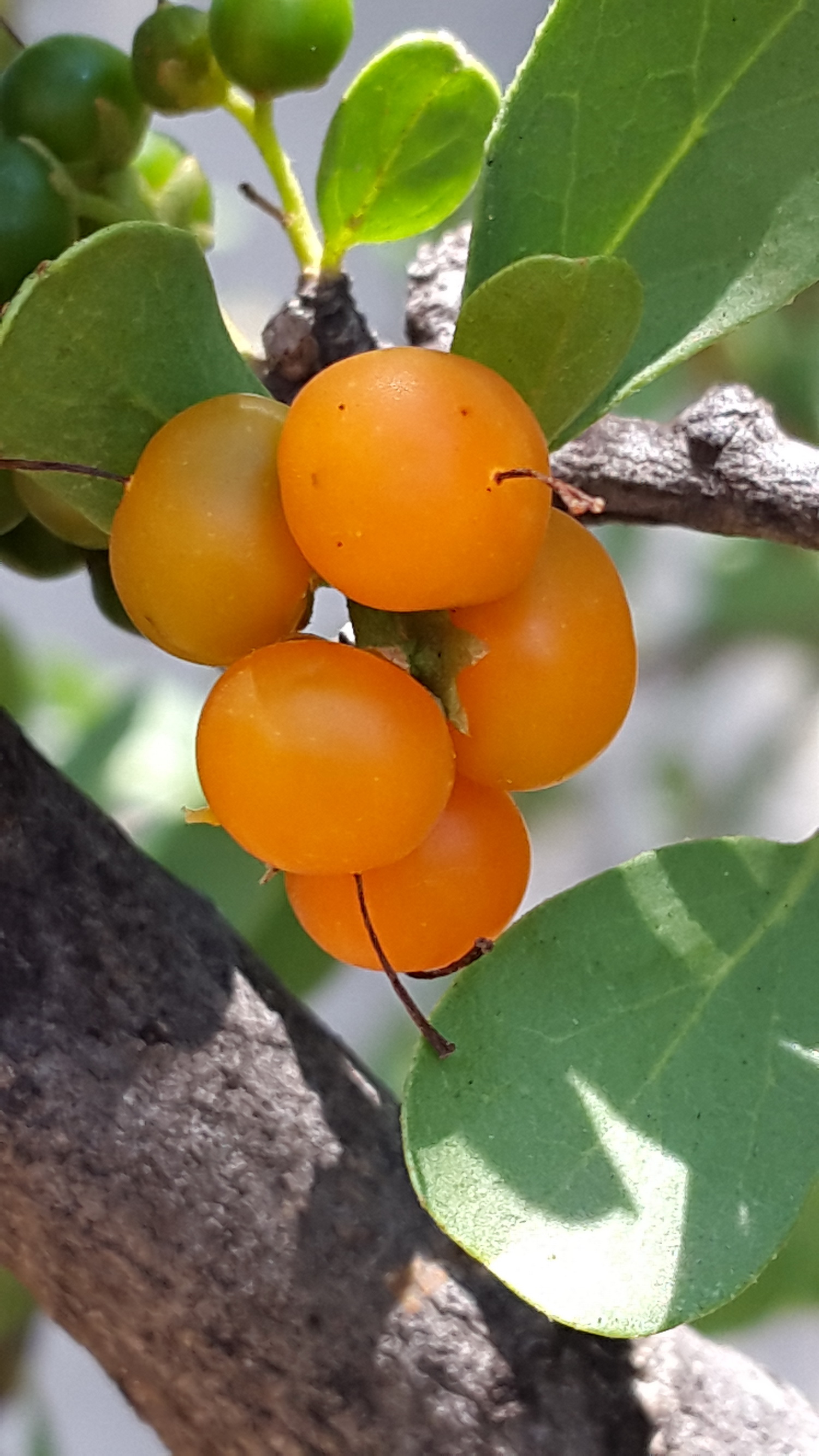
Ripe fruits

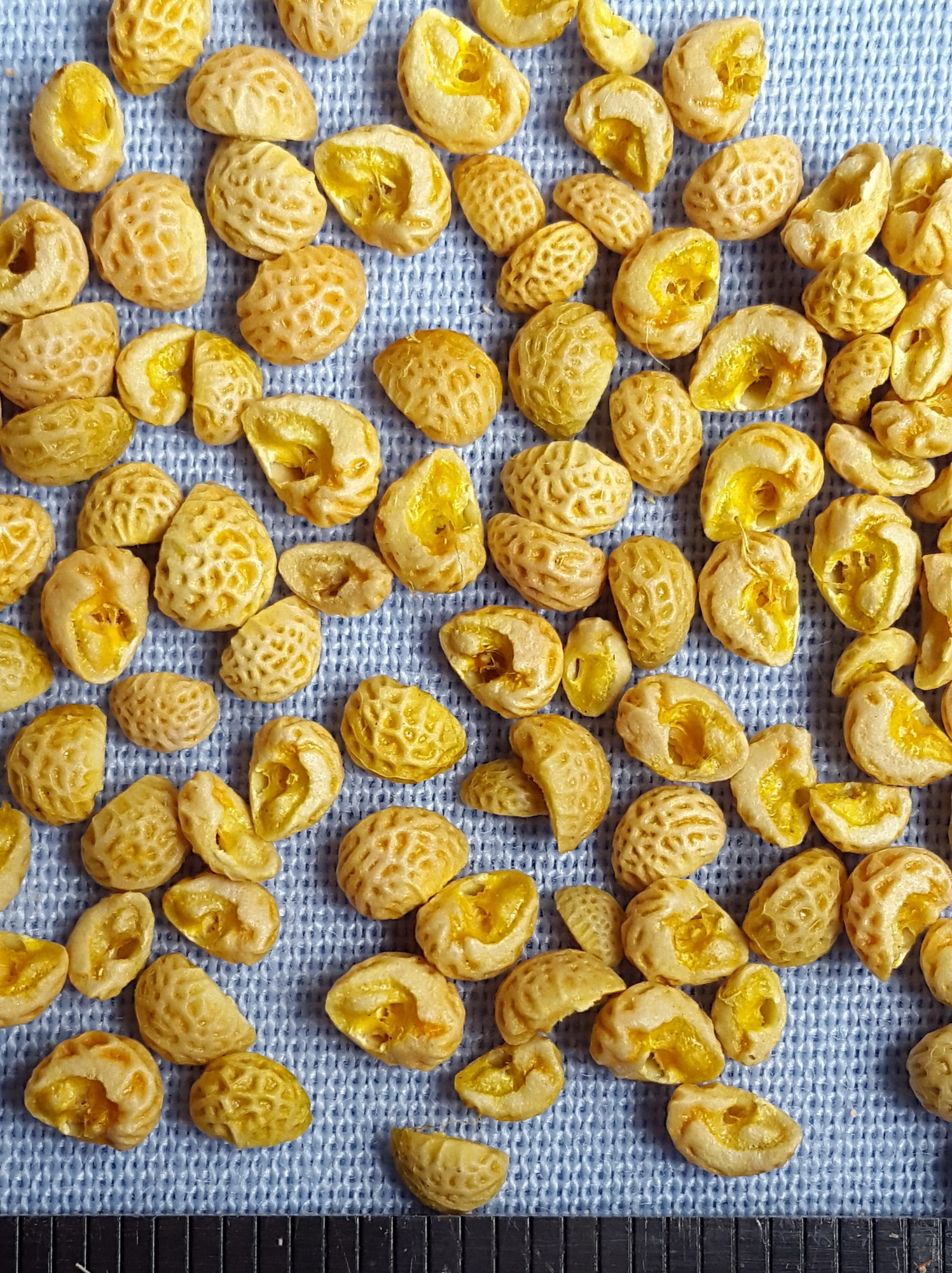
Sculpted seeds
