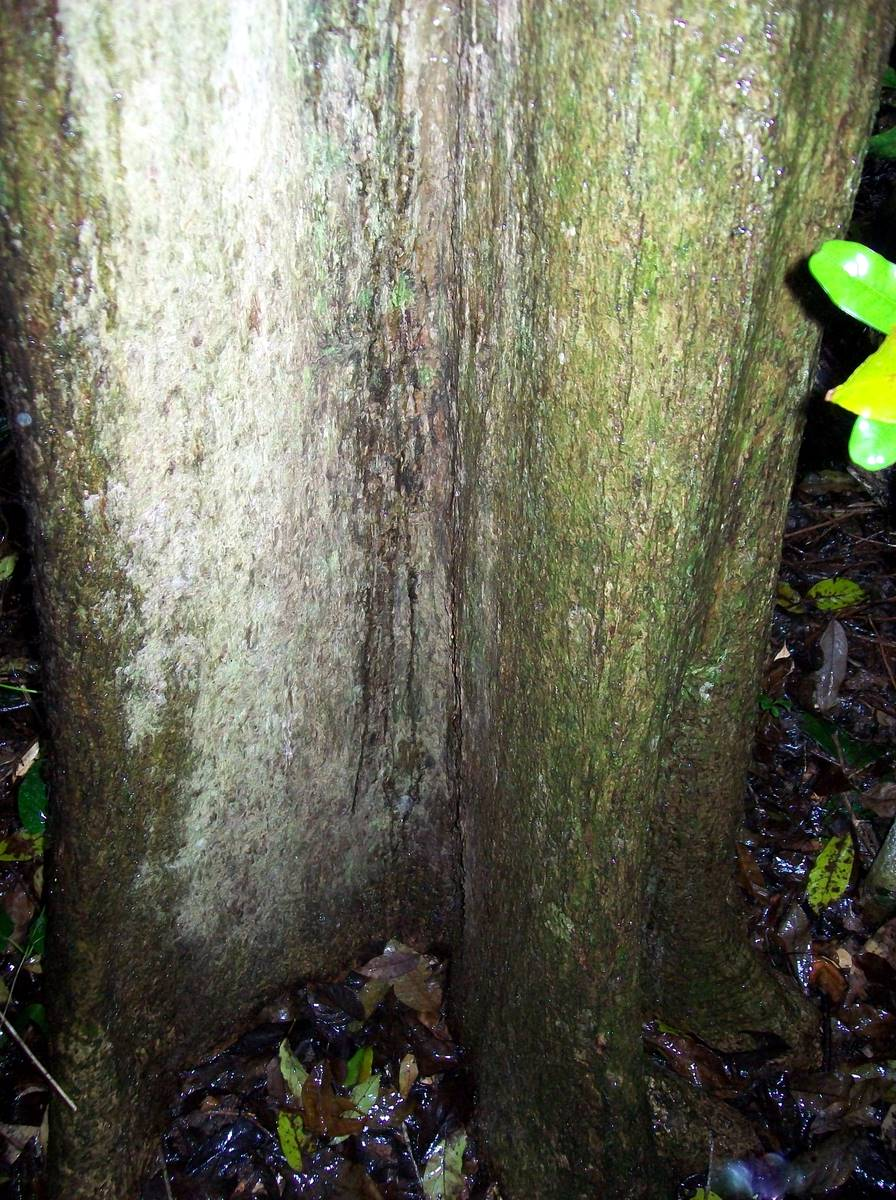
- Ehretia acuminata trunk, at Booyong, Australia

Conservation status
- Least Concern (IUCN 3.1)

Scientific classification
- Kingdom: Plantae
- Clade: Embryophytes
- Clade: Tracheophytes
- Clade: Spermatophytes
- Clade: Angiosperms
- Clade: Eudicots
- Clade: Asterids
- Order: Boraginales
- Family: Ehretiaceae
- Genus: Ehretia
- Species: E. acuminata

Binomial name
- Ehretia acuminata R.Br.

Synonyms
- 13 synonyms: Cordia thyrsiflora Siebold & Zucc.; Ehretia acuminata var. grandifolia Pamp.; Ehretia acuminata var. laxiflora Benth.; Ehretia acuminata var. obovata (Lindl.) I.M.Johnst.; Ehretia acuminata var. pilosula (F.Muell.) I.M.Johnst.; Ehretia acuminata var. polyantha (A.DC.) I.M.Johnst.; Ehretia acuminata var. pyrifolia (D.Don) I.M.Johnst.; Ehretia acuminata var. serrata (Roxb.) I.M.Johnst.; Ehretia argyi H.Lév.; Ehretia kantonensis Masam.; Ehretia onava DC.; Ehretia ovalifolia Hassk.; Ehretia pilosula F.Muell.; Ehretia polyantha DC.; Ehretia pyrifolia D.Don; Ehretia retroserrata Shao Y.Yang & F.Du; Ehretia serrata Roxb.; Ehretia serrata var. obovata Lindl.; Ehretia serrata var. pyrifolia (D.Don) DC.; Ehretia taiwaniana Nakai; Ehretia thyrsiflora (Siebold & Zucc.) Nakai; Ehretia thyrsiflora var. latifolia Nakai; Ehretia virgata Blanco

= Ehretia acuminata =

Species of flowering plant

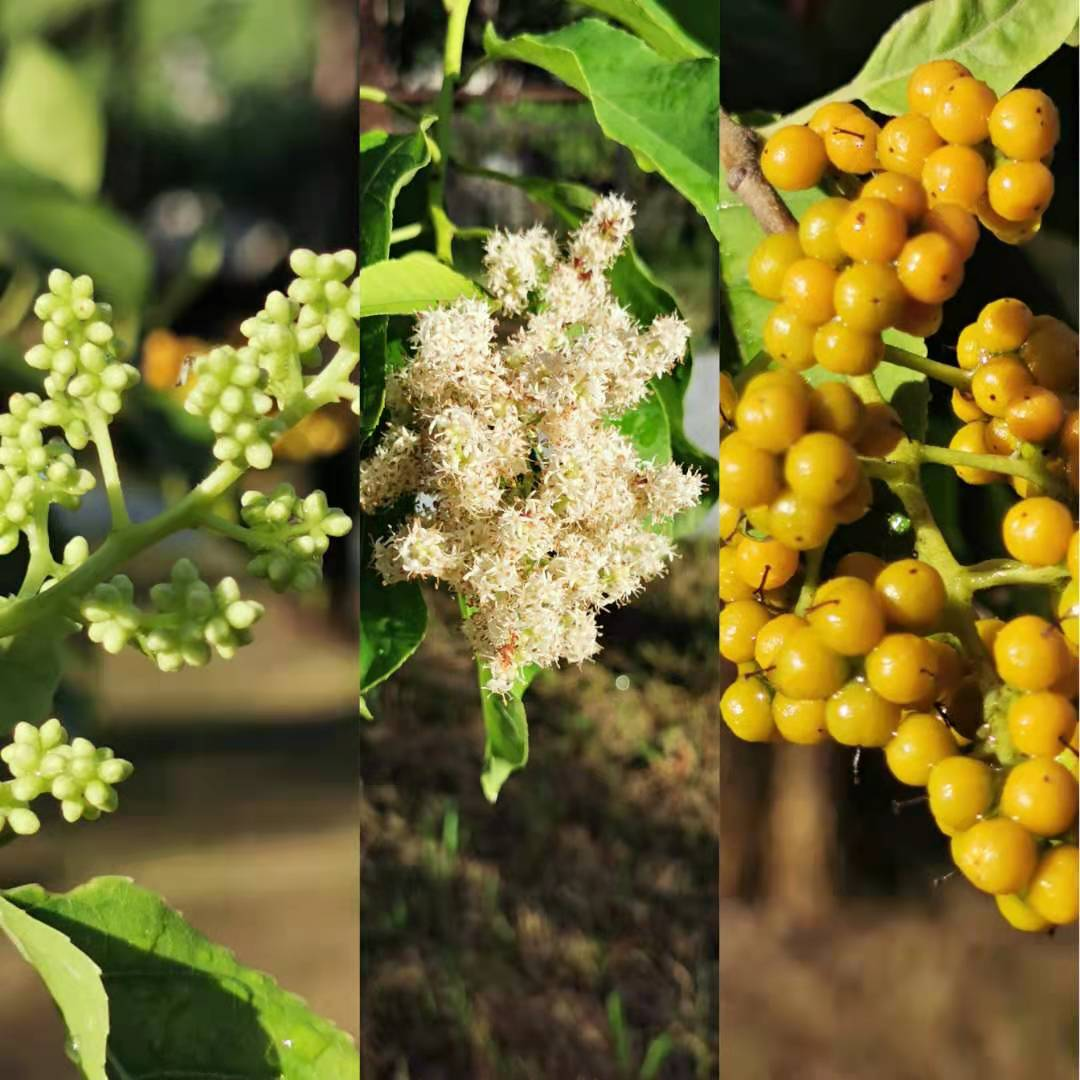
Flowers and fruit on the same roadside on the same day.

Ehretia acuminata is a deciduous tree native to regions from India to Japan and south to eastern Australia. It was first described in 1810 and has the conservation status of least concern. In Australia it is commonly known as koda.

== Description ==
Ehretia acuminata is a medium to large tree, reaching 30 m (98 ft) in height. The bark is grey and smooth and the trunk may be fluted.

=== Leaves, flowers and fruit ===
The leaves are alternate and simple, tapering to a tip, finely toothed, 8 to 13 cm (3.1 to 5.1 in) long. Smooth and green on both surfaces slightly hairy above. The midrib and lateral veins are distinct on both sides of the leaf, raised beneath.

Flowers are white, sweetly scented, in panicles. Individual flowers are without a stalk, about 4 mm (0.16 in) in diameter. Flowers appear in September to November in the southern hemisphere.

The fruit matures from January to April in Australia, in China in September, being a yellow or orange drupe, 4 to 5 mm (0.16 to 0.20 in) in diameter, containing four seeds. The fruit is edible to humans with a sweet taste. Fruit are eaten by many rainforest birds, including the Lewin's honeyeater, rose-crowned fruit-dove, brown cuckoo dove, wompoo fruit dove and Australasian figbird.

== Distribution and habitat ==
It is native to the following regions as defined in the World Geographical Scheme for Recording Plant Distributions, and has been introduced to Mauritius, Pakistan and Réunion.

- China: China South-Central, China Southeast
- Eastern Asia: Japan, Korea, Nansei-shoto, Taiwan
- Indian Subcontinent: Assam, Bangladesh, East Himalaya, India, Nepal, West Himalaya
- Indo-China: Laos, Myanmar, Thailand, Vietnam
- Malesia: Jawa, Lesser Sunda Islands, Malaya, Maluku, Philippines
- Papuasia: New Guinea
- Australia: New South Wales, Queensland

In China this plant occurs in open forests and thickets at altitudes from 100 to 1,700 m (330 to 5,580 ft). In Australia it is found on the east coast, in and on the margins of rainforest and drier forest types, from the far south of New South Wales (around Bega) to northeast Queensland near Cairns. There, its altitudinal range is from sea level to about 800 m (2,600 ft).

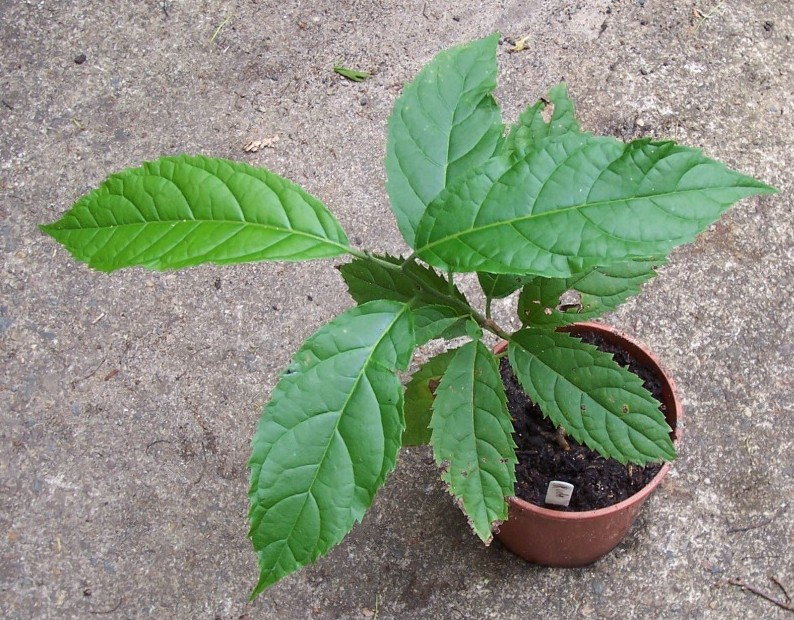
Ehretia acuminata - juvenile

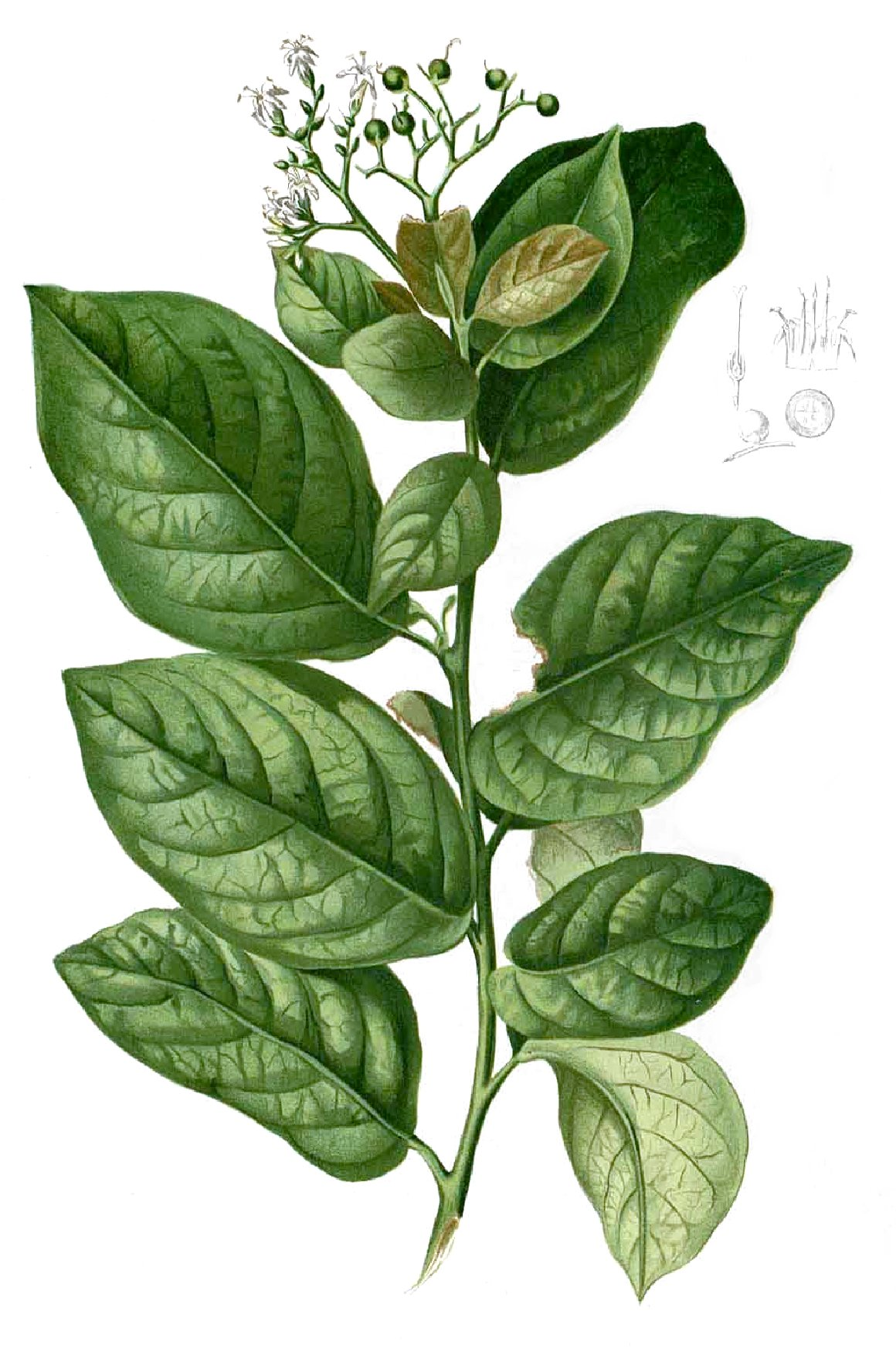
Koda

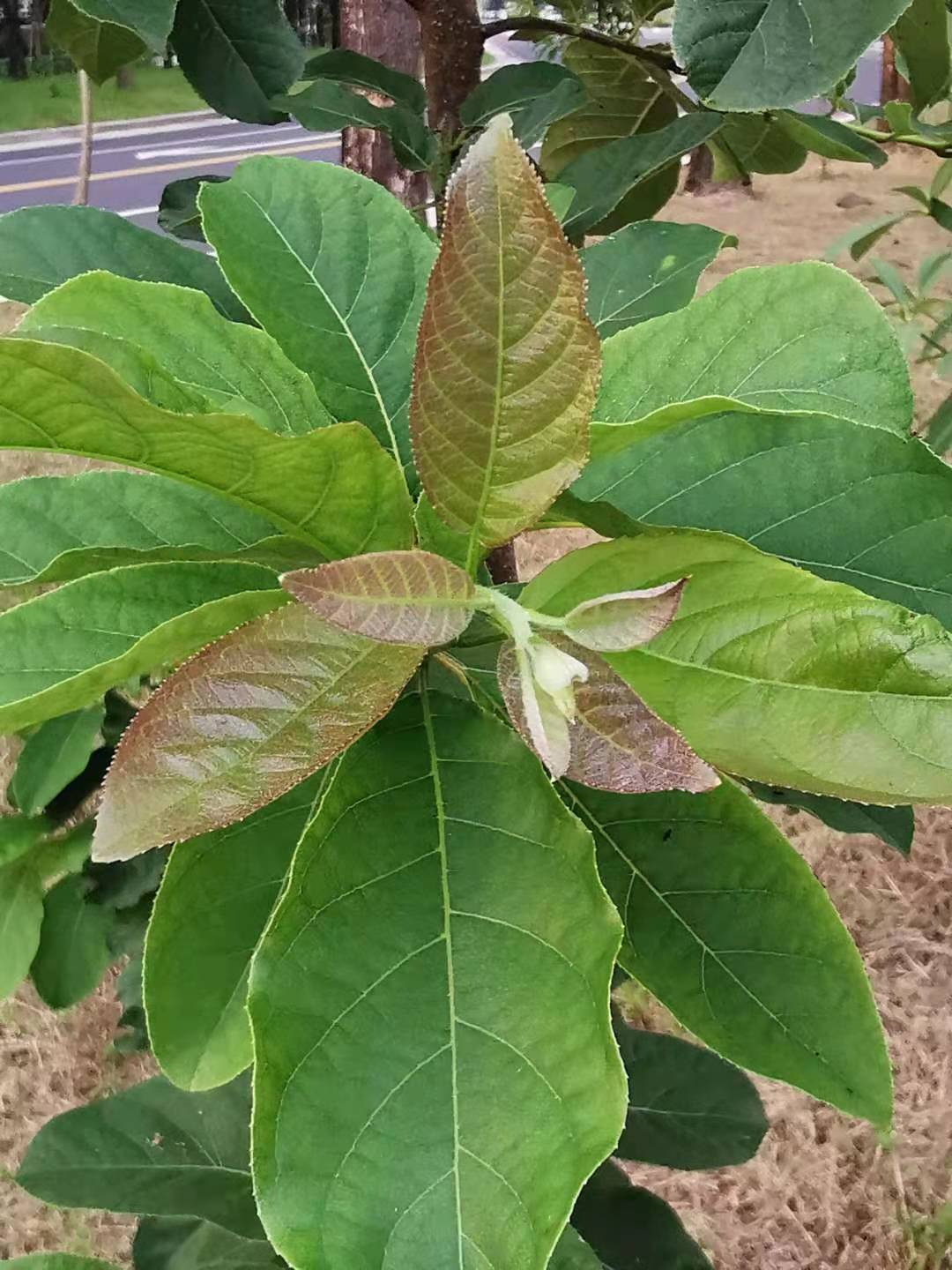
Aeneous-colored new leaves.

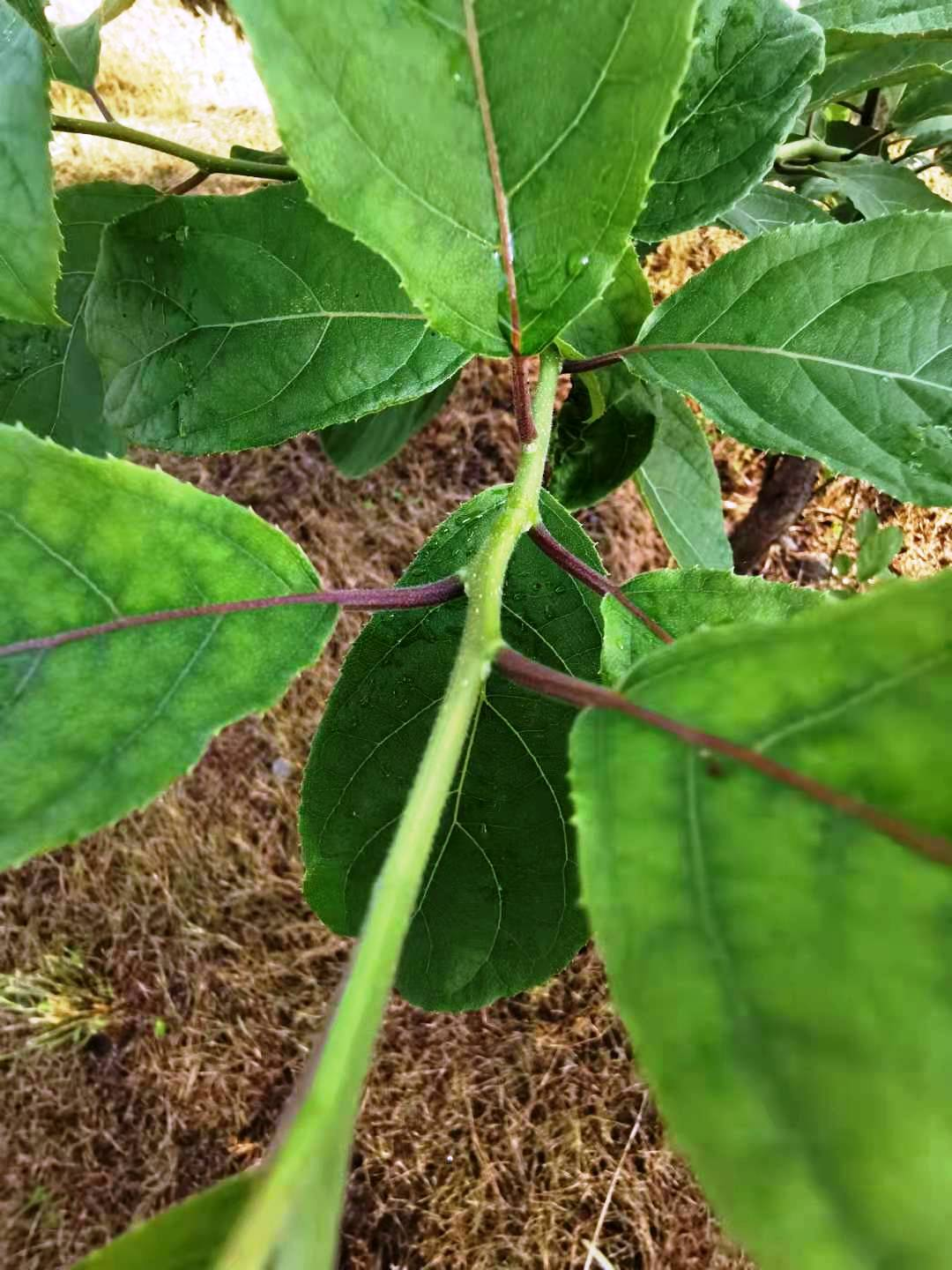
The red violet petioles and main veins of young leaves.

== Uses ==
Ehretia acuminata is used for roadside plantings, building and furniture timber, as well as in Traditional Chinese medicine.
