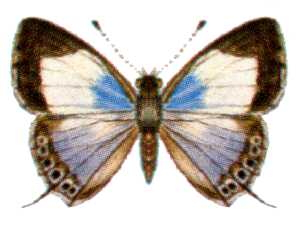
- J. p. tasmanicus

Scientific classification
- Domain: Eukaryota
- Kingdom: Animalia
- Phylum: Arthropoda
- Class: Insecta
- Order: Lepidoptera
- Family: Lycaenidae
- Genus: Jameela
- Species: J. palmyra

Binomial name
- Jameela palmyra (Felder, 1860)

Synonyms
- Lycaena palmyra Felder, 1860; Erysichton palmyra; Nacaduba valentina Grose-Smith, 1895; Nacaduba poecilta Holland, 1900; Nacaduba hyperesia Fruhstorfer, 1916; Nacaduba coelia Grose-Smith, 1894; Nacaduba subvariegata Rothschild, 1915; Lycaena tasmanicus Miskin, 1890; Lycaena elaborata Lucas, 1900

= Jameela palmyra =

Species of butterfly

Jameela palmyra, the marbled blue, is a butterfly in the family Lycaenidae. It is found in along the coast of Australia (from Queensland to New South Wales), as well as in Indonesia, New Guinea and the Solomon Islands.

== Subspecies ==
- J. p. palmyra (Ambon, Serang, Obi, Bachan, Noemfor)
- J. p. clara Tite, 1963 (New Britain)
- J. p. coelia (Grose-Smith, 1894) (Aru, Waigeu, West Irian to Papua New Guinea)
- J. p. lateplaga Tite, 1963 (Solomon Islands: Florida Island, Roviana)
- J. p. tasmanicus (Miskin, 1890) (Tanimbar, Australia: Cape York to Lake Macquarie)
