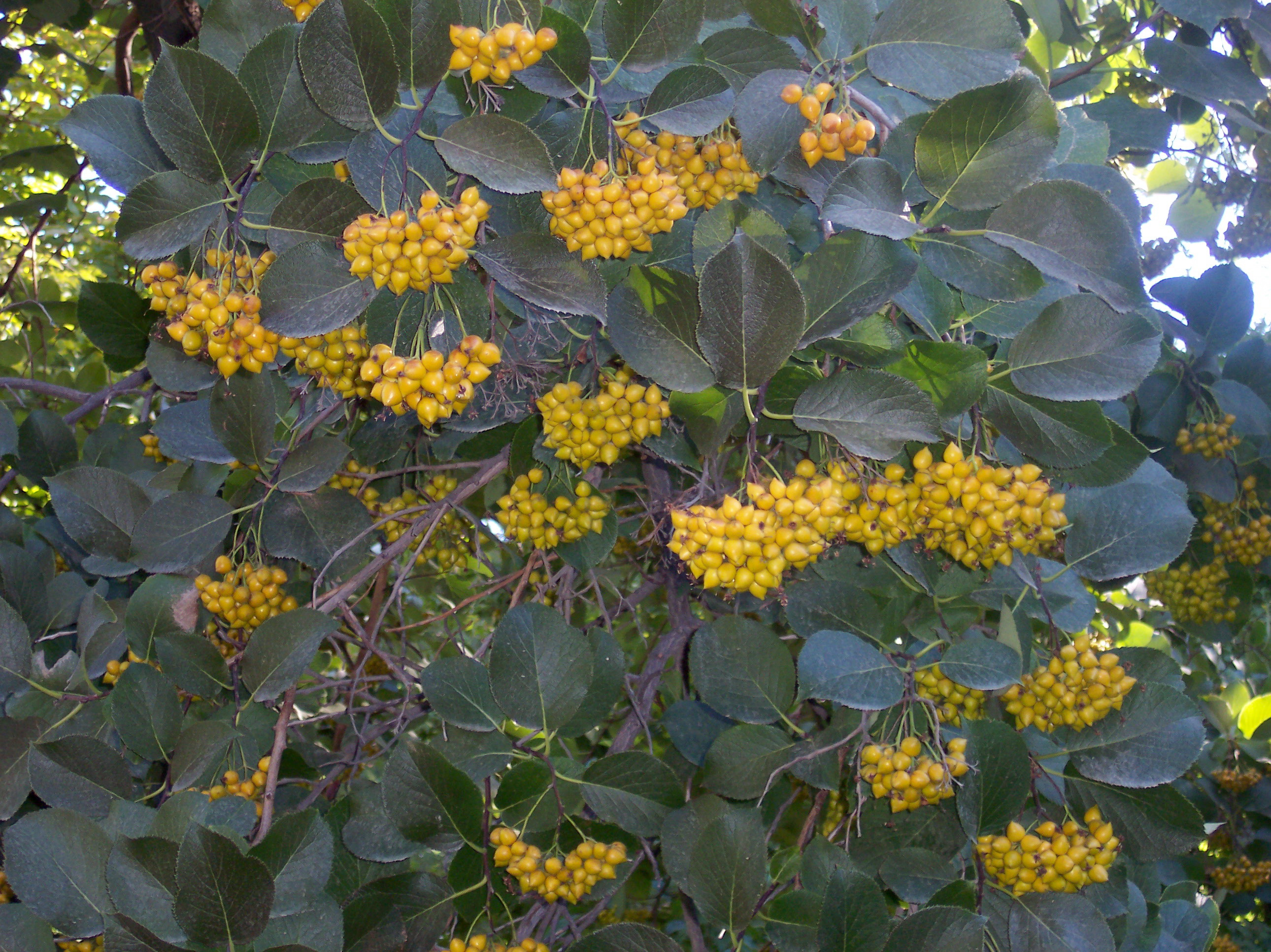
- Ehretia dicksonii var. japonica

Conservation status
- Least Concern (IUCN 3.1)

Scientific classification
- Kingdom: Plantae
- Clade: Tracheophytes
- Clade: Angiosperms
- Clade: Eudicots
- Clade: Asterids
- Order: Boraginales
- Family: Ehretiaceae
- Genus: Ehretia
- Species: E. dicksonii

Binomial name
- Ehretia dicksonii Hance

= Ehretia dicksonii =

Species of flowering plant

Ehretia dicksonii is a tree that is native to Asia and cultivated as an ornamental plant.

It grows to 15 metres and has leaves that are 8–25 cm (3.1–9.8 in) long and 4–15 cm (1.6–5.9 in) wide. These are obovate, ovate or elliptic in shape and rough to the touch. The bases are cuneate or rounded, the tips pointed and the edges serrate. It has white or pale yellow flowers that appear in terminal cymes. These are followed by yellow fruits that are between 1 and 1.5 cm in diameter.

The species occurs in open forests in Japan, China, Taiwan, Bhutan, Nepal and Vietnam.
