= Jameela albiplaga =

Scientific classification
- Kingdom: Animalia
- Phylum: Arthropoda
- Clade: Pancrustacea
- Class: Insecta
- Order: Lepidoptera
- Family: Lycaenidae
- Genus: Jameela
- Species: J. albiplaga

Binomial name
- Jameela albiplaga (Tite, 1963)

Synonyms
- Erysichton albiplaga Tite, 1963

Species of butterfly

Jameela albiplaga is a butterfly in the family Lycaenidae. It is known from New Hanover Island in the Bismarck Archipelago (Papua New Guinea).
