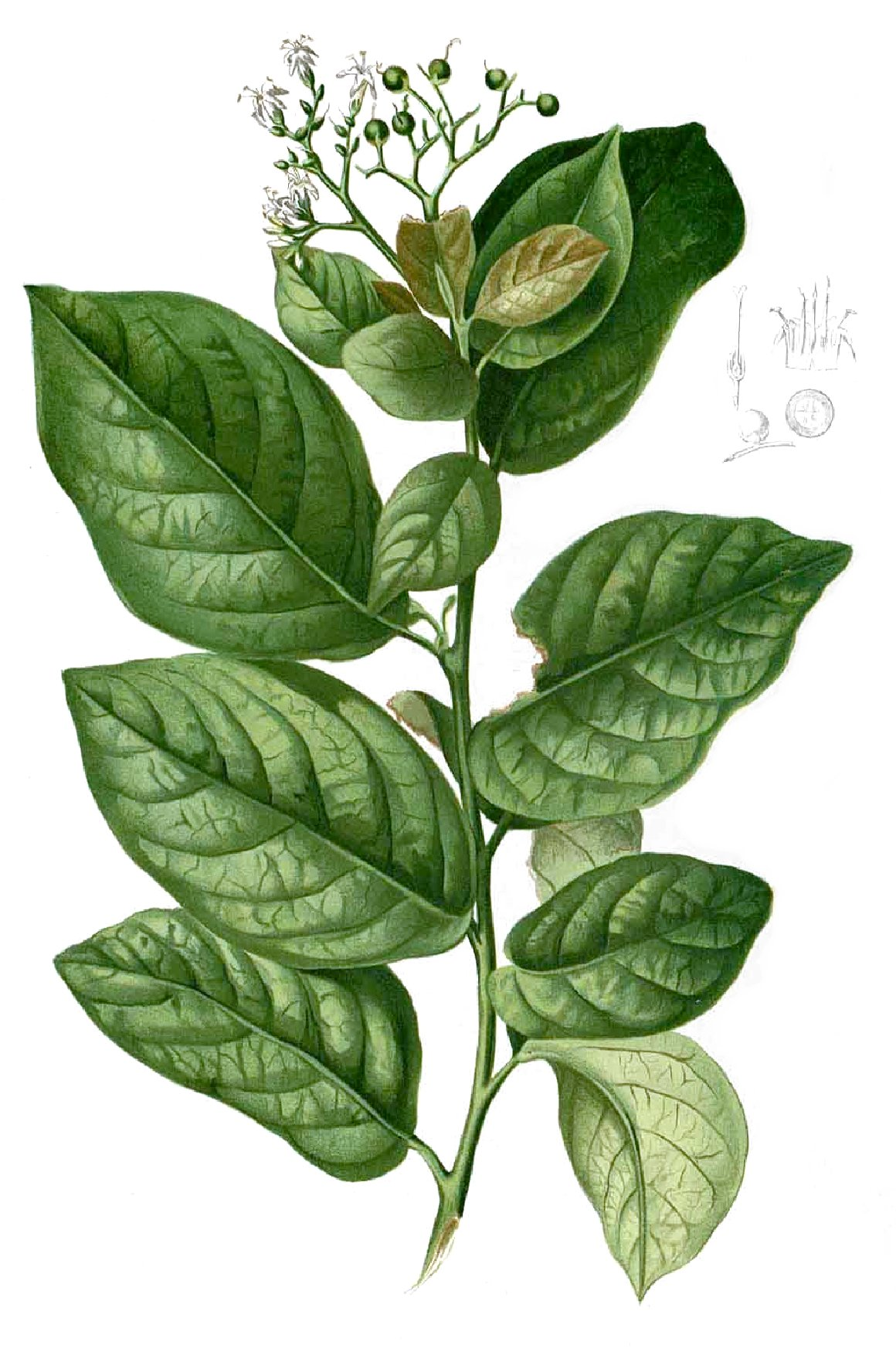
- Ehretia acuminata

Scientific classification
- Kingdom: Plantae
- Clade: Embryophytes
- Clade: Tracheophytes
- Clade: Spermatophytes
- Clade: Angiosperms
- Clade: Eudicots
- Clade: Asterids
- Order: Boraginales
- Family: Ehretiaceae
- Genus: Ehretia; P.Browne

Type species
- Ehretia tinifolia L.

Species
- see text

Synonyms
- Bruxanelia Dennst., not validly publ.; Carmona Cav.; Cortesia Cav.; Desmophyla Raf.; Gaza Terán & Berland.; Lithothamnus Zipp. ex Span.; Traxilum Raf.

= Ehretia =

Genus of flowering plants in the borage family

Ehretia is a genus of flowering plants in the family Ehretiaceae. It contains 66 species native to the tropics and subtropics of the Americas, sub-Saharan Africa, Asia, Papuasia, and Australia. The generic name honors German botanical illustrator Georg Dionysius Ehret (1708–1770).

== Species ==
Accepted species and other notable taxa

- Ehretia acuminata R.Br. – Koda (East Asia, New Guinea, eastern Australia)
- Ehretia alba Retief & A.E.van Wyk
- Ehretia amoena Klotzsch
- Ehretia anacua (Terán & Berland.) I.M.Johnst. – Anacua (Texas in the United States, Mexico)
- Ehretia angolensis Baker
- Ehretia aspera Willd. (synonym Ehretia laevis Roxb.)
- Ehretia asperula Zoll. & Moritzi
- Ehretia australis J.S.Mill.
- Ehretia bakeri Baker
- Ehretia changjiangensis F.W.Xing & Ze X.Li
- Ehretia coerulea Gürke
- Ehretia confinis I.M.Johnst.
- Ehretia cortesia Gottschling
- Ehretia corylifolia C.H.Wright
- Ehretia crebrifolia (Miers) ined.
- Ehretia cymosa Thonn.
- Ehretia decaryi J.S.Mill.
- Ehretia densiflora F.N.Wei & H.Q.Wen
- Ehretia dichotoma Blume
- Ehretia dicksonii Hance
- Ehretia dolichandra R.R.Mill
- Ehretia dunniana H.Lév.
- †Ehretia europaea E.M. Reid
- Ehretia glandulosissima Verdc.
- Ehretia grahamii Randell
- Ehretia hainanensis I.M.Johnst.
- Ehretia janjalle Verdc.
- Ehretia javanica Blume
- Ehretia kaessneri Vaupel
- Ehretia keyensis Warb.
- Ehretia latifolia Loisel.
- Ehretia lengshuikengensis S.S.Ying
- Ehretia longiflora Champ. ex Benth.
- Ehretia macrophylla Wall.
- Ehretia matthewii Kottaim.
- Ehretia meyersii J.S.Mill.
- Ehretia microcalyx Vaupel
- Ehretia microphylla Lam.
- Ehretia mollis (Blanco) Merr.
- Ehretia moluccana Riedl
- Ehretia namibiensis Retief & A.E.van Wyk
- Ehretia obtusifolia Hochst. ex A.DC.
- Ehretia papuana S.Moore
- Ehretia parallela C.B.Clarke
- Ehretia philippinensis A.DC.
- Ehretia phillipsonii J.S.Mill.
- Ehretia pingbianensis Y.L.Liu
- Ehretia pranomiana Rueangs. & Suddee
- Ehretia psilosiphon R.R.Mill
- Ehretia resinosa Hance
- Ehretia retusa (G.Don) Wall. ex A.DC.
- Ehretia rigida (Thunb.) Druce – Deurmekaarbos (Southeastern Africa)
- Ehretia rosea Gürke
- Ehretia saligna R.Br.
- Ehretia seyrigii J.S.Mill.
- Ehretia siamensis Teijsm. & Binn. ex Gagnep. & Courchet
- Ehretia silvana R.R.Mill
- Ehretia takaminei Hatus.
- Ehretia timorensis Decne.
- Ehretia tinifolia L.
- Ehretia trachyphylla C.H.Wright
- Ehretia tsangii I.M.Johnst.
- Ehretia urceolata W.Fitzg.
- Ehretia wallichiana Hook.f. & Thomson ex C.B.Clarke
- Ehretia wightiana Wall. ex G.Don
- Ehretia winitii Craib

== Fossil record ==
†Ehretia europaea fossil seeds of the Chattian stage, Oligocene, are known from the Oberleichtersbach Formation in the Rhön Mountains, central Germany. Endocarp fossils have been described from the Late Miocene locality of Pont-de-Gail in France and from the southern border of the Po Plain in northern Italy in two sites dated to the Zanclean and in three sites of supposed Zanclean age

== Taxonomy references ==
- "Index Nominum Genericorum -- Ehretia". International Code of Botanical Nomenclature. Washington, D.C.: Smithsonian Museum of Natural History.
- UniProt. "Ehretia".
- "Ehretia". Australian Plant Name Index (APNI), IBIS database. Canberra, Australian Capital Territory: Centre for Plant Biodiversity Research, Australian Government.
- "Ehretia P.Browne". African flowering plants database. Pretoria: South African National Biodiversity Institute, the Conservatoire et Jardin botaniques de la Ville de Genève and Tela Botanica.
