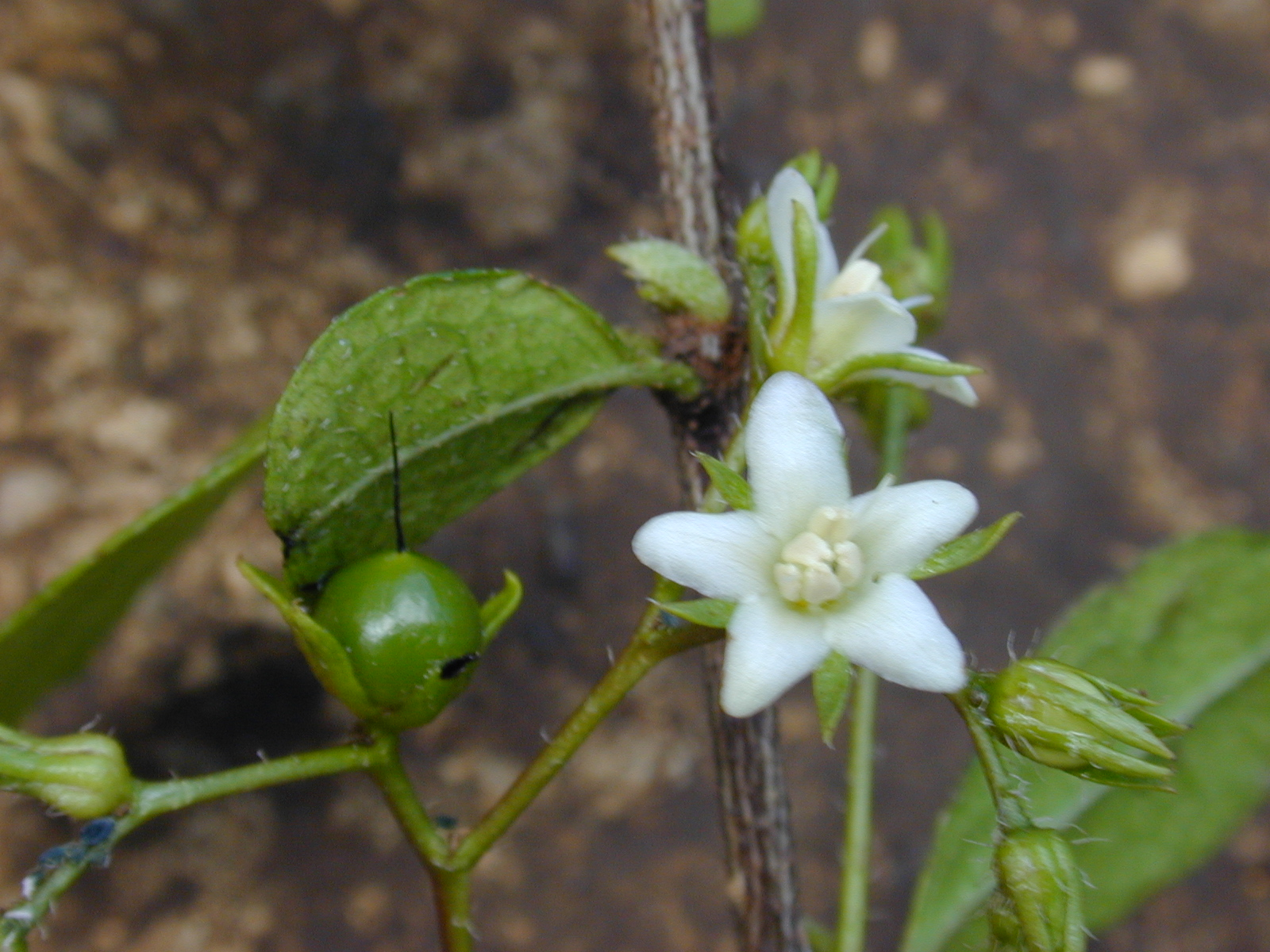
- Flower, fruit and leaf

Scientific classification
- Kingdom: Plantae
- Clade: Tracheophytes
- Clade: Angiosperms
- Clade: Eudicots
- Clade: Asterids
- Order: Boraginales
- Family: Ehretiaceae
- Genus: Ehretia
- Species: E. microphylla

Binomial name
- Ehretia microphylla Lam.

Synonyms
- Homotypic: Carmona microphylla (Lam.) G.Don; Ehretia buxifolia var. microphylla (Lam.) DC.; Heterotypic: Carmona heterophylla Cav.; Carmona retusa (Vahl) Masam.; Cordia coromandeliana Retz. ex A.DC.; Cordia retusa Vahl; Ehretia buxifolia Roxb.; Ehretia buxifolia var. heterophylla (Cav.) Gagnep.; Ehretia coromandeliana Retz. ex DC.; Ehretia dentata Courchet ex Gagnep.; Ehretia heterophylla Spreng.; Ehretia monopyrena Gottschling & Hilger; Lithothamnus buxioides Zipp. ex Span.

= Ehretia microphylla =

Species of flowering plant

Ehretia microphylla is commonly known as the Fukien tea tree or Philippine tea tree, is a species of flowering plant. The genus Ehretia is placed in the family Ehretiaceae.

== Description ==
Ehretia microphylla is a shrub growing to 4 m height, with long, straggling, slender branches. It is deciduous during the dry season. Its leaves are usually 10–50 mm long and 5–30 mm wide, and may vary in size, texture, colour and margin. It has small white flowers 8–10 mm in diameter with a 4–5 lobed corolla, and drupes 4–6 mm in diameter, ripening brownish orange.

== Distribution and habitat ==
The plant occurs widely in eastern and south-eastern Asia from India, Indochina, southern China, and Japan, through Malesia (including the Australian territory of Christmas Island) and New Guinea to mainland Australia (Cape York Peninsula) and the Solomon Islands. It has become an invasive weed in Hawaii where it is a popular ornamental plant and where the seeds are thought to be spread by fruit-eating birds.

On Cape York Peninsula, the plant is recorded from semi-evergreen vine thickets. On Christmas Island, it favours dry sites on the terraces, and sometimes occurs in rainforest.

== Uses ==
The plant is popular in Penjing in China. The leaves are used medicinally in the Philippines to treat cough, colic, diarrhea and dysentery.
