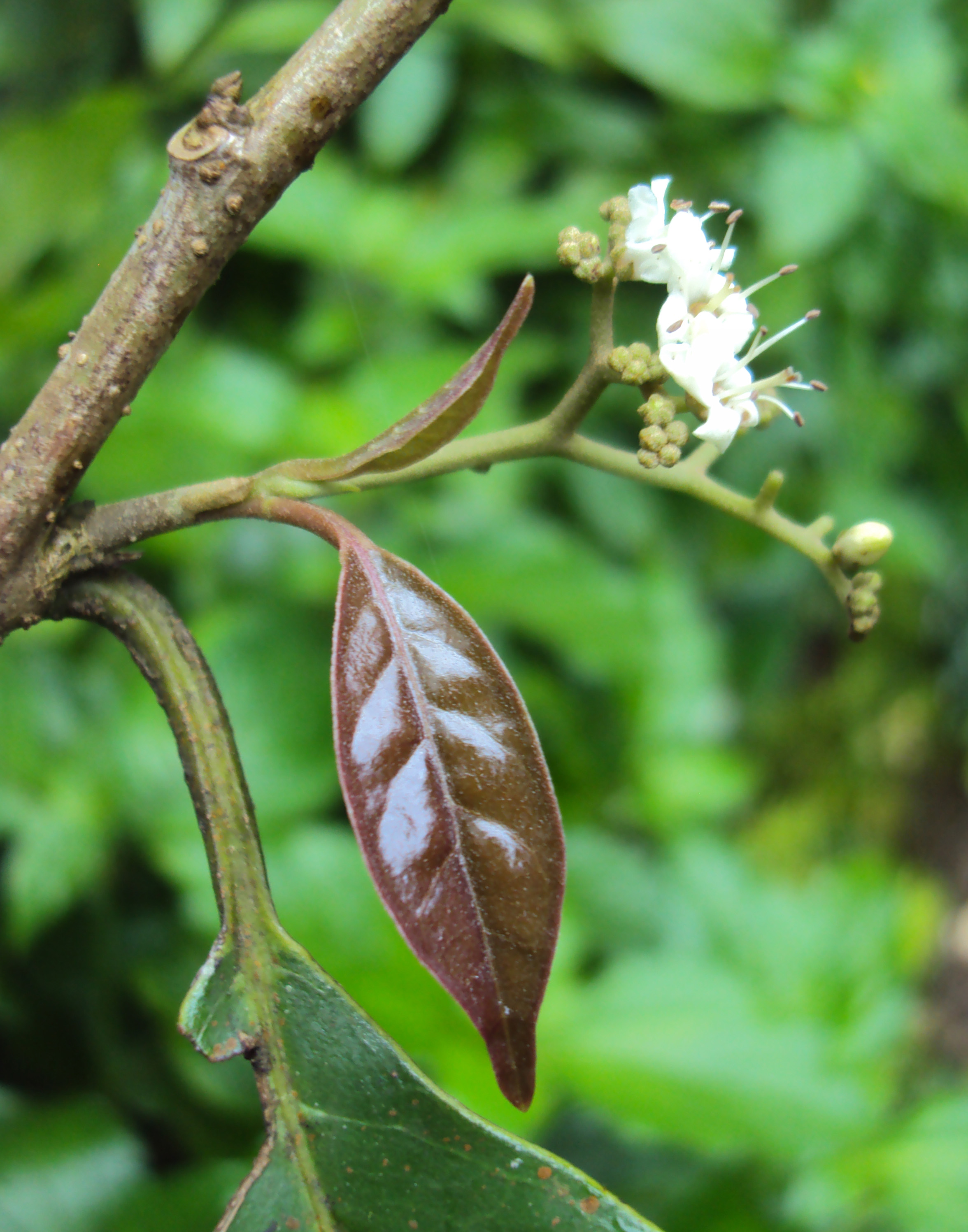

Conservation status
- Data Deficient (IUCN 3.1)

Scientific classification
- Kingdom: Plantae
- Clade: Tracheophytes
- Clade: Angiosperms
- Clade: Eudicots
- Clade: Asterids
- Order: Boraginales
- Family: Ehretiaceae
- Genus: Ehretia
- Species: E. aspera

Binomial name
- Ehretia aspera Willd. (1794)

Synonyms
- Synonymy: Bourreria aspera (Willd.) G.Don (1837); Bourreria dichotoma Rottler ex G.Don (1837); Bourreria laevis G.Don (1837); Bourreria punctata (Roth) G.Don (1837); Bruxanelia indica Dennst. (1818), not validly publ.; Ehretia affinis Wall. (1829), not validly publ.; Ehretia canarensis Miq. (1847), nom. subnud.; Ehretia catronga Buch.-Ham. ex Wall. (1832), not validly publ.; Ehretia championii Wight & Gardner ex C.B.Clarke (1883), not validly publ.; Ehretia cutranga C.B.Clarke (1883), orth. var.; Ehretia floribunda Royle ex Benth. (1836); Ehretia heynei Roem. & Schult. (1819); Ehretia laevis Roxb. (1796); Ehretia laevis var. canarensis C.B.Clarke (1883); Ehretia laevis var. floribunda (Royle ex Benth.) Brandis (1874); Ehretia laevis var. platyphylla Merr. (1935); Ehretia laevis var. pubescens (Royle ex Benth.) C.B.Clarke (1883); Ehretia pubescens Royle ex Benth. (1836); Ehretia punctata Roth (1819); Traxilum asperatum Raf. (1838)

= Ehretia aspera =

Species of flowering plant

Ehretia aspera is a species of flowering plant belonging to the family Ehretiaceae. It is a small tree native to the Indian subcontinent (India, Pakistan, the Himalayas, and Sri Lanka), Indochina (Cambodia, Laos, Myanmar, Thailand, and Vietnam), Peninsular Malaysia, and Hainan. It grows in dry deciduous forests. It flowers and fruits in January and February.
