= Dialectica aemula =

Scientific classification
- Kingdom: Animalia
- Phylum: Arthropoda
- Clade: Pancrustacea
- Class: Insecta
- Order: Lepidoptera
- Family: Gracillariidae
- Genus: Dialectica
- Species: D. aemula

Binomial name
- Dialectica aemula (Meyrick, 1916)

Species of moth

Dialectica aemula is a moth of the family Gracillariidae. It is known from Australia (the Northern Territory, Tasmania, Queensland and Victoria), India (Bihar) and Nepal.

The adult is similar to Dialectica scalariella, which was introduced deliberately into Australia, but the cocoons are more easily distinguished.

The larvae feed on Cynoglossum species (including Cynoglossum australe, Cynoglossum lanceolatum and Cynoglossum suaveolens), Trichodesma indicum and Trichodesma zeylanicum. They mine the leaves of their host plant.
