= Phytoecia malachitica =

Scientific classification
- Domain: Eukaryota
- Kingdom: Animalia
- Phylum: Arthropoda
- Class: Insecta
- Order: Coleoptera
- Suborder: Polyphaga
- Infraorder: Cucujiformia
- Family: Cerambycidae
- Genus: Phytoecia
- Species: P. malachitica

Binomial name
- Phytoecia malachitica Lucas, 1849

Synonyms
- Phytoecia hispancia Breuning, 1951; Phytoecia hispanica Breuning, 1951; Phytoecia (Hoplotoma) bolivari Perez, 1874; Opsilia malachitica (Lucas)

Species of beetle

Phytoecia malachitica is a species of beetle in the family Cerambycidae. It was described by Hippolyte Lucas in 1849. It is known from Portugal, Sicily, Algeria, Spain, Morocco, and Tunisia. It feeds on Cerinthe major, Cerinthe gymnandra, Echium italicum, Cynoglossum cheirifolium, Cynoglossum creticum, and Cynoglossum clandestinum.
