= Dialectica hedemanni =

Scientific classification
- Domain: Eukaryota
- Kingdom: Animalia
- Phylum: Arthropoda
- Class: Insecta
- Order: Lepidoptera
- Family: Gracillariidae
- Genus: Dialectica
- Species: D. hedemanni

Binomial name
- Dialectica hedemanni (Rebel, 1896)

Synonyms
- Gracilaria hedemanni Rebel, 1896

Species of moth

Dialectica hedemanni is a moth of the family Gracillariidae. It is known from the Canary Islands and Madeira.

The larvae feed on Lavatera acerifolia, Lavatera arborea, Lavatera phoenicea, Malva neglecta, Malva parviflora and Malva sylvestris. They mine the leaves of their host plant.
