= Dialectica ehretiae =

Scientific classification
- Kingdom: Animalia
- Phylum: Arthropoda
- Clade: Pancrustacea
- Class: Insecta
- Order: Lepidoptera
- Family: Gracillariidae
- Genus: Dialectica
- Species: D. ehretiae

Binomial name
- Dialectica ehretiae (Vári, 1961)

Synonyms
- Acrocercops ehretiae Vári, 1961

Species of moth

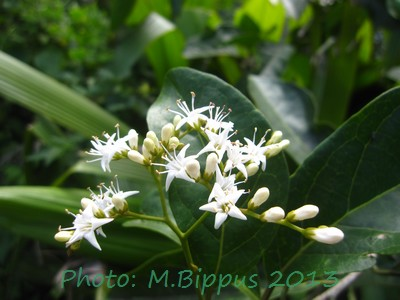
Ehretia cymosa

Dialectica ehretiae is a moth of the family Gracillariidae. It is known from South Africa and Ethiopia.

The larvae feed on Ehretia cymosa var. abyssinica and Ehretia rigida. They mine the leaves of their host plant.
