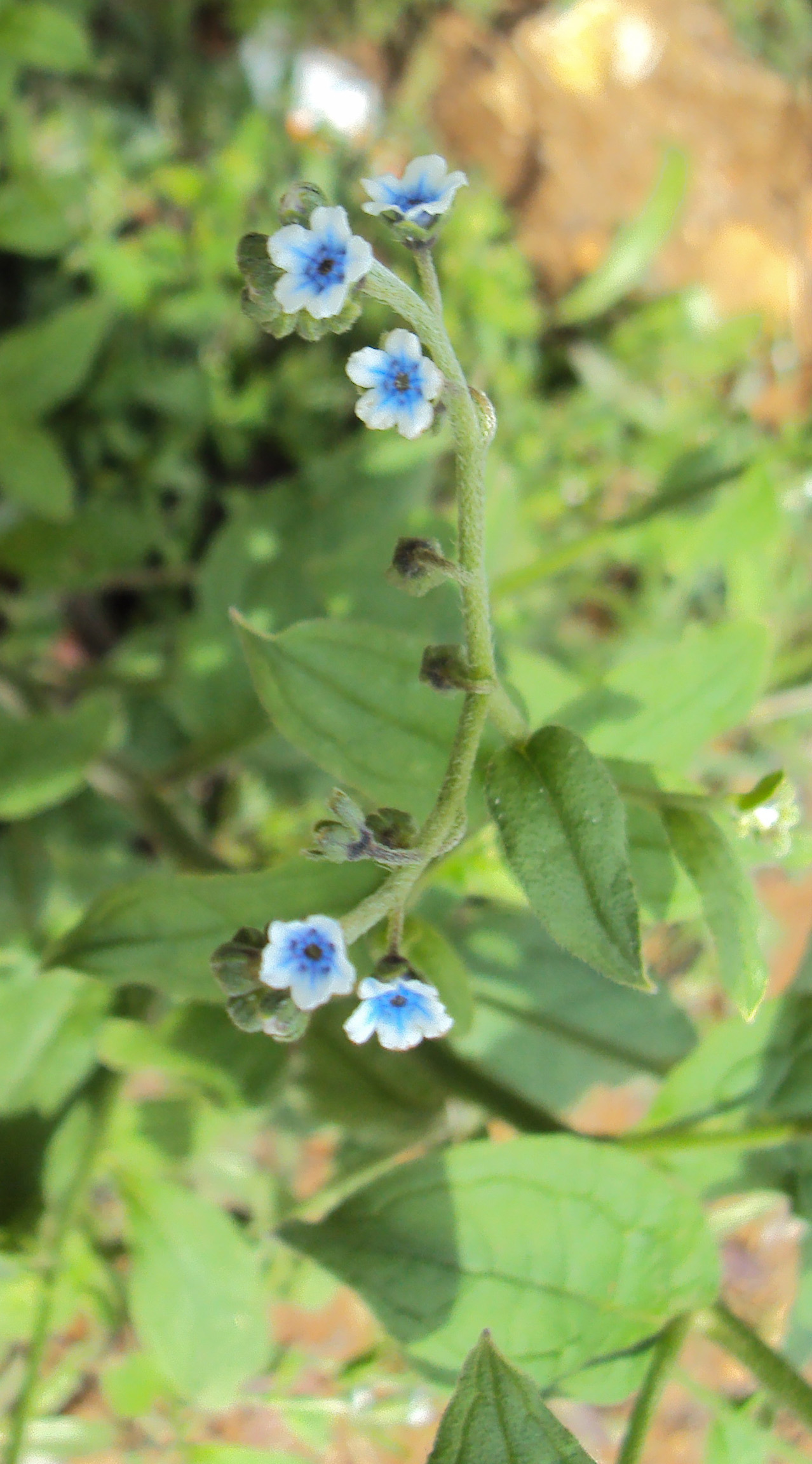

Scientific classification
- Kingdom: Plantae
- Clade: Tracheophytes
- Clade: Angiosperms
- Clade: Eudicots
- Clade: Asterids
- Order: Boraginales
- Family: Boraginaceae
- Genus: Cynoglossum
- Species: C. zeylanicum

Binomial name
- Cynoglossum zeylanicum (Sw. ex Lehm.) Thunb. ex Brand

Synonyms
- List: Anchusa zeylanica Vahl ex Hornem.; Cynoglossum denticulatum var. zeylanicum (Sw. ex Lehm.) C.B.Clarke; Echinospermum zeylanicum (Sw. ex Lehm.) Lehm.; Myosotis zeylanica Sw. ex Lehm.; Rochelia zeylanica (Sw. ex Lehm.) Roem. & Schult.; Cynoglossum caeruleum Buch.-Ham. ex D.Don; Cynoglossum edgeworthii A.DC.; Cynoglossum furcatum Wall.; Cynoglossum furcatum f. albiflorum (H.Hara) Yonek.; Cynoglossum furcatum var. lanceolatum C.B.Clarke; Cynoglossum furcatum var. tenerum Royle ex Benth.; Cynoglossum furcatum var. villosulum (Nakai) Riedl; Cynoglossum heynei G.Don; Cynoglossum imeretinum Kusn.; Cynoglossum ovatum Moon; Cynoglossum villosulum Nakai; Cynoglossum zeylanicum f. albiflorum H.Hara; Cynoglossum zeylanicum var. lanceolatum (C.B.Clarke) Brand; Cynoglossum zeylanicum var. villosulum (Nakai) Ohwi; Paracynoglossum furcatum (Wall.) Popov; Paracynoglossum imeretinum (Kusn.) Popov

= Cynoglossum zeylanicum =

Species of flowering plant

Cynoglossum zeylanicum, also called the Ceylon hound's tongue, Ceylon forget-me-not, and Indian hound's tongue, is a species of flowering plant in the family Boraginaceae. It is found throughout Asia. It has also been introduced to the Americas.

== Description ==
Ceylon's hound's tongue is similar in appearance to Cynoglossum lanceolatum, but has larger flowers that are 4–5 mm across. The fruits are small, about 2 mm across.

== Distribution ==
It is native to Afghanistan, Pakistan, India, Nepal, Sri Lanka, Southeast Asia, China, Taiwan, Japan, and South Korea. It has been introduced to North America, the Caribbean, and South America. It occurs at altitudes of 1,200-4,100 m.

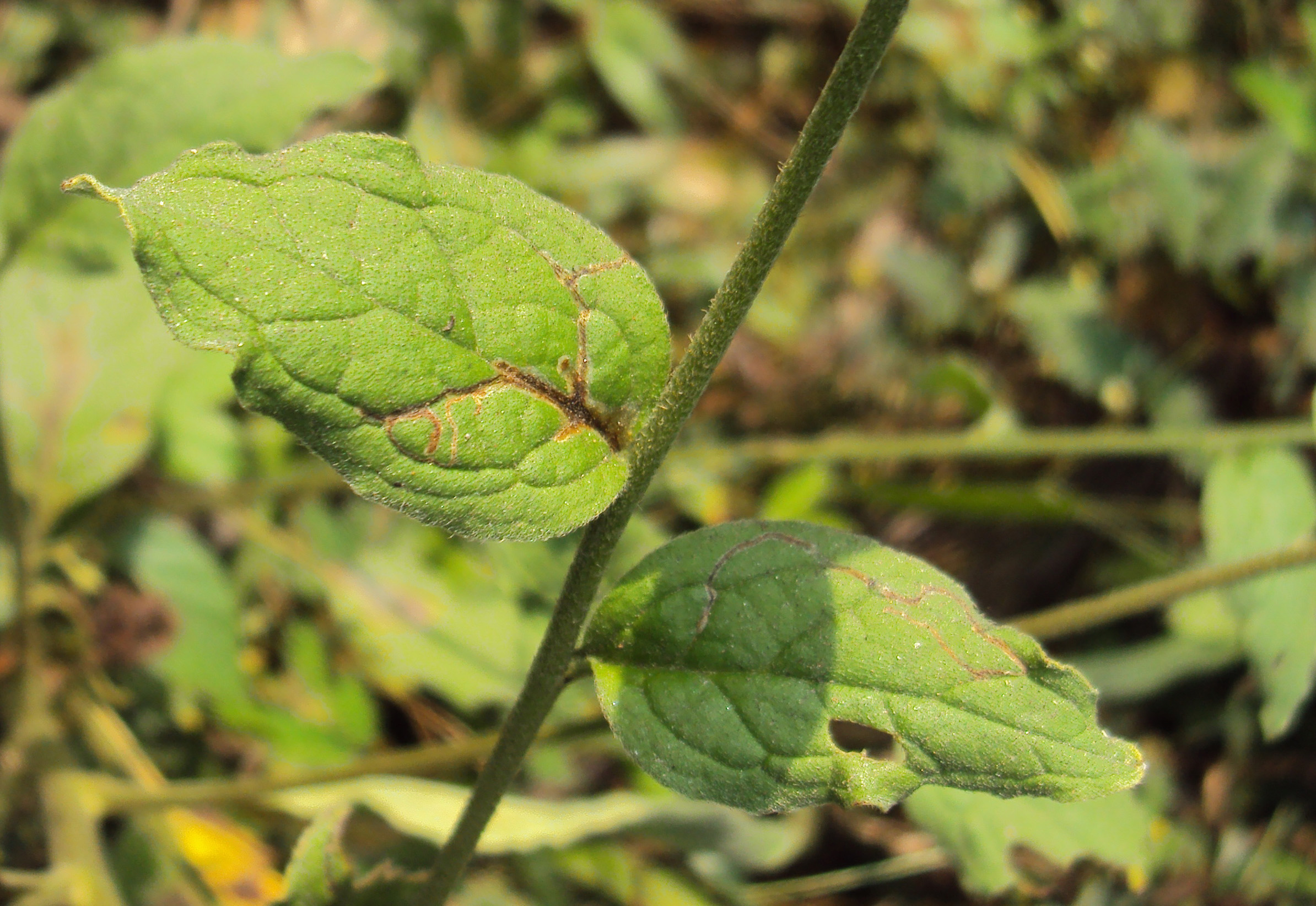
Leaves

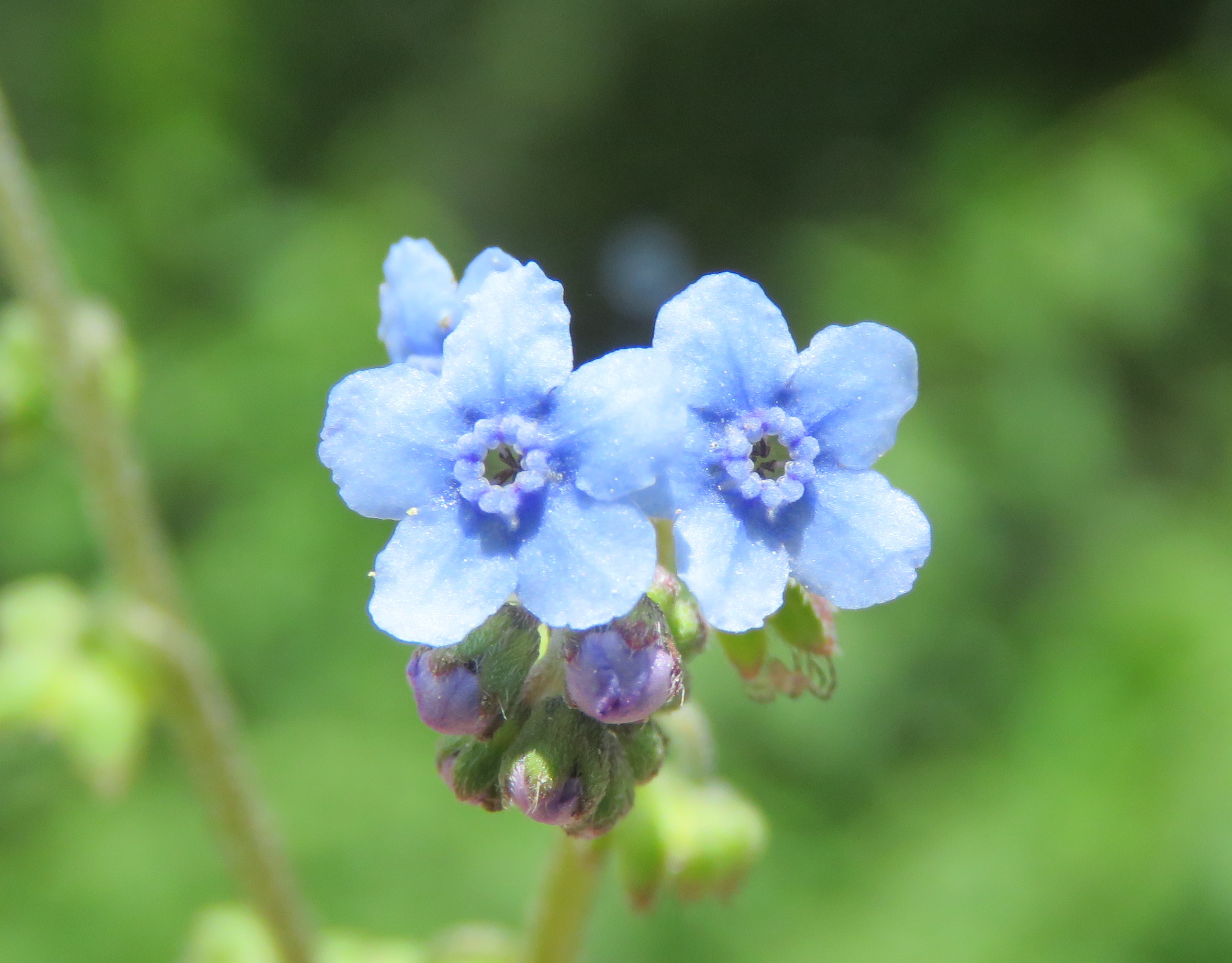
Flower detail

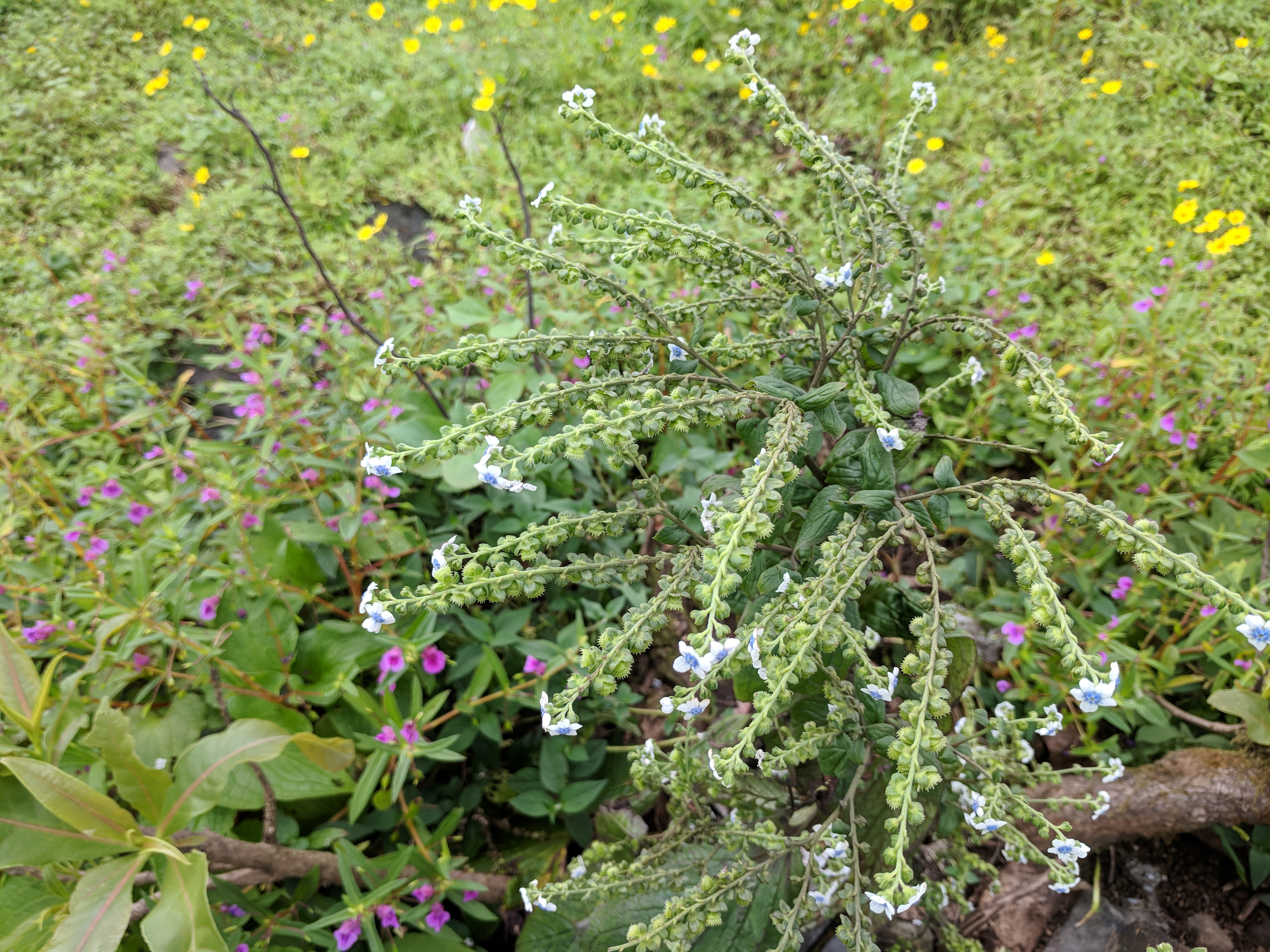
Flowers and fruits
