= Dialectica pyramidota =

Scientific classification
- Kingdom: Animalia
- Phylum: Arthropoda
- Class: Insecta
- Order: Lepidoptera
- Family: Gracillariidae
- Genus: Dialectica
- Species: D. pyramidota

Binomial name
- Dialectica pyramidota Meyrick, 1918

Synonyms
- Acrocercops pyramidota Meyrick, 1918

Species of moth

Dialectica pyramidota is a moth of the family Gracillariidae. It is known from South Africa and Réunion.

The larvae feed on Ehretia rigida. They probably mine the leaves of their host plant.
