= Dialectica cordiaecola =

Scientific classification
- Kingdom: Animalia
- Phylum: Arthropoda
- Class: Insecta
- Order: Lepidoptera
- Family: Gracillariidae
- Genus: Dialectica
- Species: D. cordiaecola

Binomial name
- Dialectica cordiaecola Vári, 1961

Species of moth

Dialectica cordiaecola is a moth of the family Gracillariidae. It is known from South Africa.

The larvae feed on Cordia caffra. They mine the leaves of their host plant.
