= Dialectica praegemina =

Scientific classification
- Kingdom: Animalia
- Phylum: Arthropoda
- Clade: Pancrustacea
- Class: Insecta
- Order: Lepidoptera
- Family: Gracillariidae
- Genus: Dialectica
- Species: D. praegemina

Binomial name
- Dialectica praegemina Meyrick, 1917

Synonyms
- Acrocercops praegemina Meyrick, 1917

Species of moth

Dialectica praegemina is a moth of the family Gracillariidae. It is known from South Africa.

The larvae feed on Lobostemon glaucophyllus. They probably mine the leaves of their host plant.
