= Dialectica galactozona =

Scientific classification
- Kingdom: Animalia
- Phylum: Arthropoda
- Class: Insecta
- Order: Lepidoptera
- Family: Gracillariidae
- Genus: Dialectica
- Species: D. galactozona

Binomial name
- Dialectica galactozona Vári, 1961

Species of moth

Dialectica galactozona is a moth of the family Gracillariidae. It is known from South Africa.
