= Dialectica odontosema =

Scientific classification
- Kingdom: Animalia
- Phylum: Arthropoda
- Class: Insecta
- Order: Lepidoptera
- Family: Gracillariidae
- Genus: Dialectica
- Species: D. odontosema

Binomial name
- Dialectica odontosema (Vári, 1961)

Synonyms
- Acrocercops odontosema Vári, 1961

Species of moth

Dialectica odontosema is a moth of the family Gracillariidae. It is known from South Africa.
