= Dialectica japonica =

Scientific classification
- Kingdom: Animalia
- Phylum: Arthropoda
- Class: Insecta
- Order: Lepidoptera
- Family: Gracillariidae
- Genus: Dialectica
- Species: D. japonica

Binomial name
- Dialectica japonica Kumata & Kuroko, 1988

Species of moth

Dialectica japonica is a moth of the family Gracillariidae. It is known from Kyūshū, Japan.

The wingspan is 7.5–8.6 mm.

The larvae feed on Ehretia ovalifolia. They mine the leaves of their host plant.
