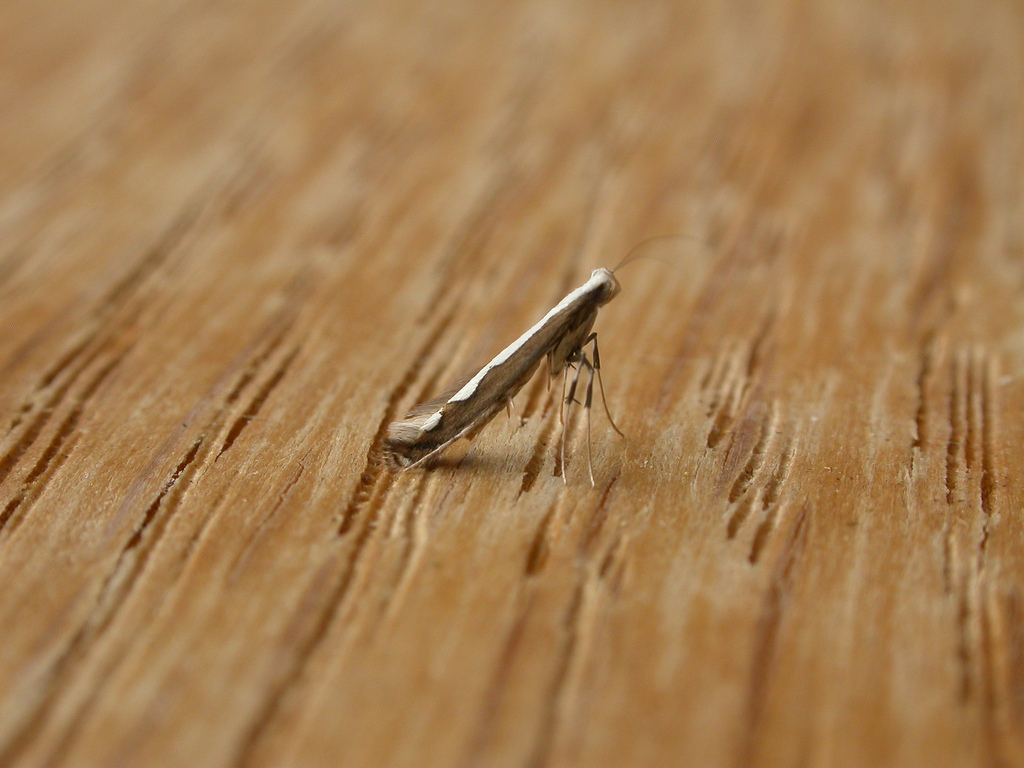

Scientific classification
- Domain: Eukaryota
- Kingdom: Animalia
- Phylum: Arthropoda
- Class: Insecta
- Order: Lepidoptera
- Family: Gracillariidae
- Genus: Dialectica
- Species: D. scalariella

Binomial name
- Dialectica scalariella (Zeller, 1850)

Synonyms
- Gracilaria scalariella Zeller, 1850

= Dialectica scalariella =

Echium leaf miner

Species of moth

Dialectica scalariella (echium leaf miner) is a moth of the family Gracillariidae. It is found from France to the Iberian Peninsula, Italy and the Balkan Peninsula. Recently an imago was found in Great Britain. It was introduced in Australia for the biological control of the weed Echium plantagineum and has since spread to New Zealand.

The larvae feed on Anchusa strigosa, Borago, Cynoglossum creticum, Echium aculeatum, Echium giganteum, Echium plantagineum, Echium vulgare, Myosotis latifolia and Symphytum officinale. They mine the leaves of their host plant.
