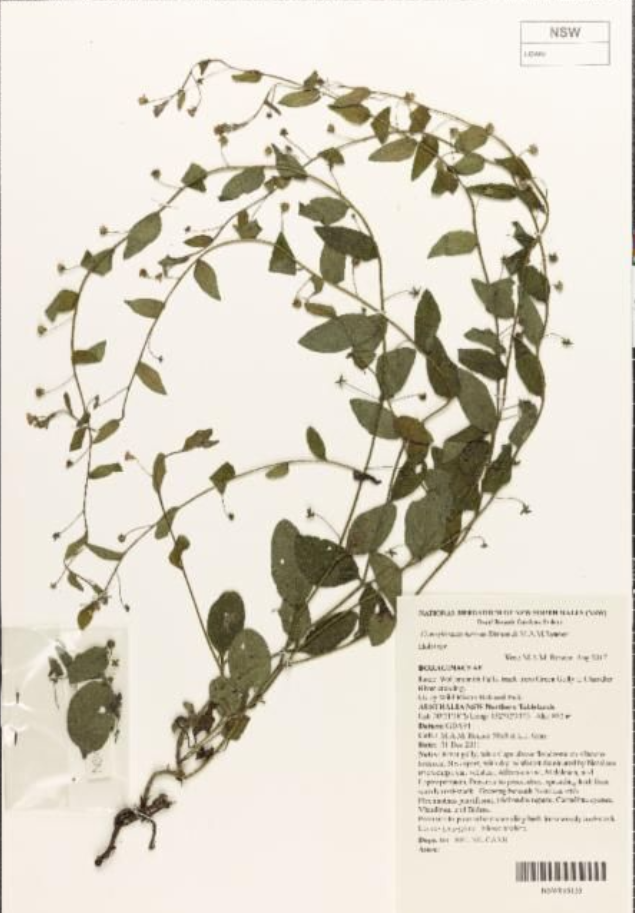

Scientific classification
- Kingdom: Plantae
- Clade: Embryophytes
- Clade: Tracheophytes
- Clade: Spermatophytes
- Clade: Angiosperms
- Clade: Eudicots
- Clade: Asterids
- Order: Boraginales
- Family: Boraginaceae
- Genus: Cynoglossum
- Species: C. torvum

Binomial name
- Cynoglossum torvum Dimon & M.A.M.Renner

Synonyms
- Hackelia torva (Dimon & M.A.M.Renner) Ovchinnikova

= Cynoglossum torvum =

Species of flowering plant

Cynoglossum torvum is an Australian flowering plant in the family Boraginaceae.

Cynoglossum torvum was first formally described in 2017 by Richard Dimon and Matt Renner. The specific epithet torvum when used in relation to eyes, "means staring, piercing or wild", and describes the mericarp inner surface.

It is an Australian endemic species found in northern New South Wales and southern Queensland.
