= Dialectica carcharota =

Scientific classification
- Kingdom: Animalia
- Phylum: Arthropoda
- Class: Insecta
- Order: Lepidoptera
- Family: Gracillariidae
- Genus: Dialectica
- Species: D. carcharota

Binomial name
- Dialectica carcharota Meyrick, 1912

Synonyms
- Acrocercops carcharota Meyrick, 1912

Species of moth

Dialectica carcharota is a moth of the family Gracillariidae. It is known from South Africa, Ethiopia and Zimbabwe.

The larvae feed on Borago officinalis, Cynoglossum hochstetteri and Lithospermum species.
