= Dialectica rendalli =

Scientific classification
- Domain: Eukaryota
- Kingdom: Animalia
- Phylum: Arthropoda
- Class: Insecta
- Order: Lepidoptera
- Family: Gracillariidae
- Genus: Dialectica
- Species: D. rendalli

Binomial name
- Dialectica rendalli Walsingham, 1897

Species of moth

Dialectica rendalli is a moth of the family Gracillariidae. It is known from Jamaica, Puerto Rico and the Virgin Islands (Saint Croix and Saint Thomas).

The larvae feed on Hibiscus rosa-sinensis. They probably mine the leaves of their host plant.
