= Dialectica anselmella =

Scientific classification
- Kingdom: Animalia
- Phylum: Arthropoda
- Class: Insecta
- Order: Lepidoptera
- Family: Gracillariidae
- Genus: Dialectica
- Species: D. anselmella

Binomial name
- Dialectica anselmella Guillermet, 2011

Species of moth

Dialectica anselmella is a moth of the family Gracillariidae. It is found on La Réunion.

The larvae feed on Cordia amplifolia.
