= Dialectica pavonicola =

Scientific classification
- Kingdom: Animalia
- Phylum: Arthropoda
- Class: Insecta
- Order: Lepidoptera
- Family: Gracillariidae
- Genus: Dialectica
- Species: D. pavonicola

Binomial name
- Dialectica pavonicola (Vári, 1961)

Synonyms
- Acrocercops pavonicola Vári, 1961

Species of moth

Dialectica pavonicola is a moth of the family Gracillariidae. It is known from South Africa.

The larvae feed on Pavonia columella. They mine the leaves of their host plant.
