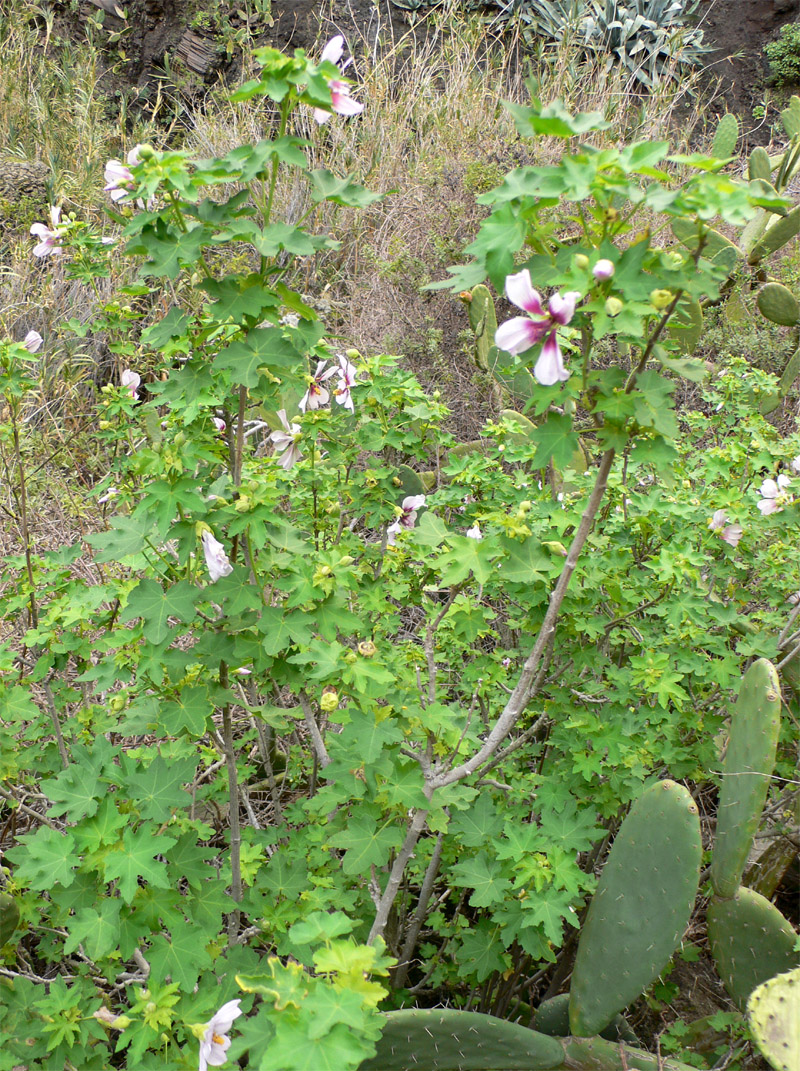

Scientific classification
- Kingdom: Plantae
- Clade: Embryophytes
- Clade: Tracheophytes
- Clade: Angiosperms
- Clade: Eudicots
- Clade: Rosids
- Order: Malvales
- Family: Malvaceae
- Genus: Malva
- Species: M. acerifolia

Binomial name
- Malva acerifolia (Cav.) Alef.

Synonyms
- Althaea acerifolia (Cav.) Kuntze; Lavatera acerifolia Cav.; Saviniona acerifolia (Cav.) Webb & Berthel.; Malva canariensis M.F.Ray, nom. illeg. et superfl.

= Malva acerifolia =

Species of flowering plant

Malva acerifolia, also frequently known under the synonyms Lavatera acerifolia or Malva canariensis is a shrub endemic to the Canary Islands, belonging to the family Malvaceae.

== Taxonomy ==
The species was first described in 1803 in the genus Lavatera by Antonio José Cavanilles as Lavatera acerifolia. It was transferred to Malva by Friedrich Alefeld in 1862, although this was not accepted by most other botanists until much later. In 1842, the name "Malva acerifolia" had been mentioned by Wilhelm Gerhard Walpers in relation to a quite different North American species that Walpers called Sphaeralcea acerifolia (now Iliamna rivularis). On this basis, in 1998, Martin Forbes Ray published the replacement name Malva canariensis. Although this is regarded as the correct name by some sources, the International Plant Names Index treats Walpers' Malva acerifolia as erroneous so that the replacement name is unnecessary and hence superfluous and illegitimate.

The Latin name acerifolia means 'maple-leaved'.

Two varieties are recognised: the nominate form which is found on the western islands, and M. acerifolia var. hariensis Svent. found on the eastern islands.

== Common names ==
It has been called Canary tree mallow in English. It is known as malva de risco in Spanish, which translates as 'cliff mallow'.

== Description ==
This plant is a small tree or shrub, which will grow to approximately 5 ft. high in three or four years in cultivated. It can grow up to three metres in its native land. It is easily recognisable in situ by means of its large flowers. The branches are alternate, and the bark becomes ashy-coloured on older specimens. The leaves are also alternate. They are four to five inches in the first year, but then decrease in size to two to three in the following years, always being smaller than their petioles. The leaves have a palmately lobed shape, with five to seven, lanceolate, supple lobes, without teeth on their margins, each lobe with a corresponding vein down its centre leading to the base of the leaf. The stipules are awl-shaped.

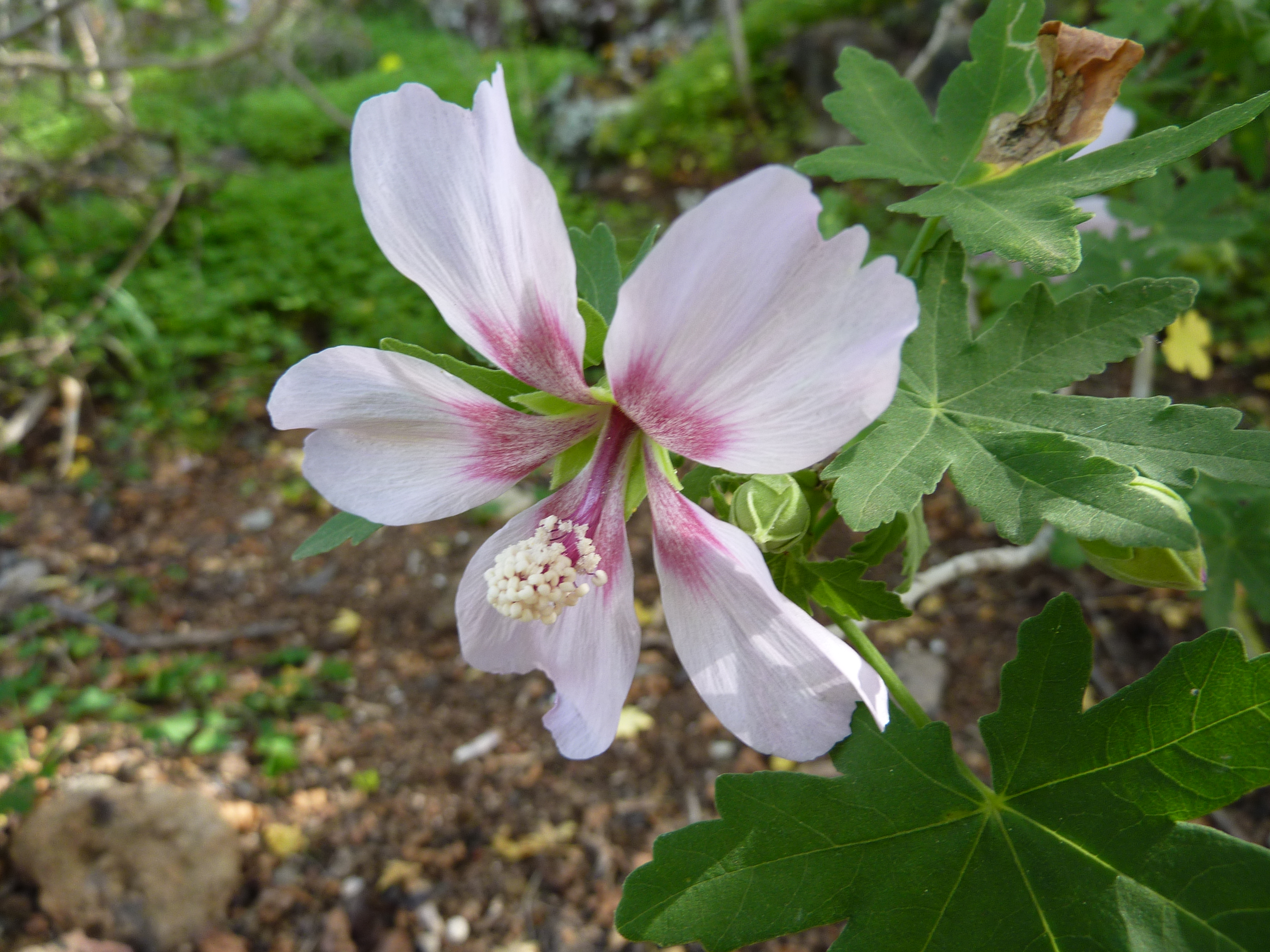
Flower of the nominate variety

The flowers are axillary and solitary, with somewhat bent peduncles, these being always much longer than the leaf petioles. The calyx is glabrous; the corolla is some three inches in diameter, and has five petals (sometimes a petal may be undeveloped) which become broader towards the end. Cavanilles describes the petals as coloured light pink, with dark purple streaks near the base, and the undersides white. They have also been described as a very pallid lilac, almost white, with the base of the petals a more darker colour. The styles of the pistils and filaments of the stamens are bundled together like a column and are coloured purple. The pollen is globose and depressed in shape. There is one seed per locule, these are arranged in a wheel, with the number of seeds corresponding to the number of the stigmas, twelve to fifteen.

== Distribution ==
The shrub was first collected by the French biologist Pierre Marie Auguste Broussonet on the island of Tenerife during his sojourn there at the turn of the 18th century. Broussonet was unable to complete his planned work on the flora of the island, but he sent a number of seeds to his friend Cavanilles, who described the species from plants grown from these seeds in his gardens.

The nominate variety occurs on the islands of Gran Canaria, Tenerife, Gomera, La Palma in the west of the archipelago; the variety hariensis occurs on Fuerteventura and Lanzarote in the east. El Hierro is the only island in the archipelago where the species does not occur.

This species arrived in the Canary Islands from a Mediterranean origin and it is more recent than the other endemics to the islands, such as Lavatera phoenicea, which colonized the islands earlier and independently from Malva acerifolia. Its closest relative is not known as there is some incongruence between chloroplast and nuclear molecular markers.

== Ecology ==
It grows in the lower elevations of these islands, in dry, sunny locations. It is found growing on cliffs and in rocky scrubland. It is a somewhat ruderal species, preferring nitrogen-rich soils, especially on disturbed ground or abandoned farmland.

It is pollinated by insects, especially by bees.

== Uses ==
It makes a good fodder for livestock. In some parts of the Canary Islands these shrubs were traditionally cultivated as an ornamental in rural areas, but it is now found planted in urban gardens on the islands, valued for the attractive flowers, rapid growth and ease of cultivation.

== Conservation ==
Legally, the regional government declared the species to be a "protected plant" in 1991 and the populations on Fuerteventura and Lanzarote were listed in the 2001 Catálogo de Especies Amenazadas de Canarias; these laws were effectively repealed with the passing of the 2010 Catálogo Canario de Especies Protegidas, in which only the variety hariensis was included with the status of endangered. It has not been assessed by the IUCN.
