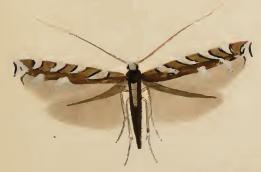
- Dialectica imperialella - Stainton’s Natural History of the Tineina (1855–1873): Dialectica imperialella

Scientific classification
- Domain: Eukaryota
- Kingdom: Animalia
- Phylum: Arthropoda
- Class: Insecta
- Order: Lepidoptera
- Family: Gracillariidae
- Subfamily: Acrocercopinae
- Genus: Dialectica; Walsingham, 1897

Species
- See text

= Dialectica (moth) =

Genus of insects

Dialectica is a genus of 22 moth species in the family Gracillariidae.

== Species ==
- Dialectica aemula (Meyrick, 1916)
- Dialectica anselmella Guillermet, 2011
- Dialectica carcharota (Meyrick, 1912)
- Dialectica columellina (Vári, 1961)
- Dialectica cordiaecola Vári, 1961
- Dialectica ehretiae (Vári, 1961)
- Dialectica galactozona Vári, 1961
- Dialectica galapagosensis Landry, 2006
- Dialectica geometra (Meyrick, 1916)
- Dialectica hedemanni (Rebel, 1896)
- Dialectica imperialella (Zeller, 1847)
- Dialectica japonica Kumata & Kuroko, 1988
- Dialectica odontosema (Vári, 1961)
- Dialectica pavonicola (Vári, 1961)
- Dialectica permixtella Walsingham, 1897
- Dialectica praegemina (Meyrick, 1917)
- Dialectica pyramidota (Meyrick, 1918)
- Dialectica rendalli Walsingham, 1897
- Dialectica sanctaecrucis Walsingham, 1897
- Dialectica scalariella (Zeller, 1850)
- Dialectica soffneri (Gregor & Povolný, 1965)
- Dialectica trigonidota (Vári, 1961)
