= Dialectica galapagosensis =

Scientific classification
- Kingdom: Animalia
- Phylum: Arthropoda
- Clade: Pancrustacea
- Class: Insecta
- Order: Lepidoptera
- Family: Gracillariidae
- Genus: Dialectica
- Species: D. galapagosensis

Binomial name
- Dialectica galapagosensis Landry, 2006

Species of moth

Dialectica galapagosensis is a moth of the family Gracillariidae. It is known from the Galápagos Islands.

The larvae feed on Macraea laricifolia. They probably mine the leaves of their host plant.
