= Dialectica soffneri =

Scientific classification
- Kingdom: Animalia
- Phylum: Arthropoda
- Clade: Pancrustacea
- Class: Insecta
- Order: Lepidoptera
- Family: Gracillariidae
- Genus: Dialectica
- Species: D. soffneri

Binomial name
- Dialectica soffneri (Gregor & Povolný, 1965)

Synonyms
- Acrocercops soffneri Gregor & Povolný, 1965

Species of moth

Dialectica soffneri is a moth of the family Gracillariidae. It is known from Austria, Bulgaria, Hungary and Greece.
