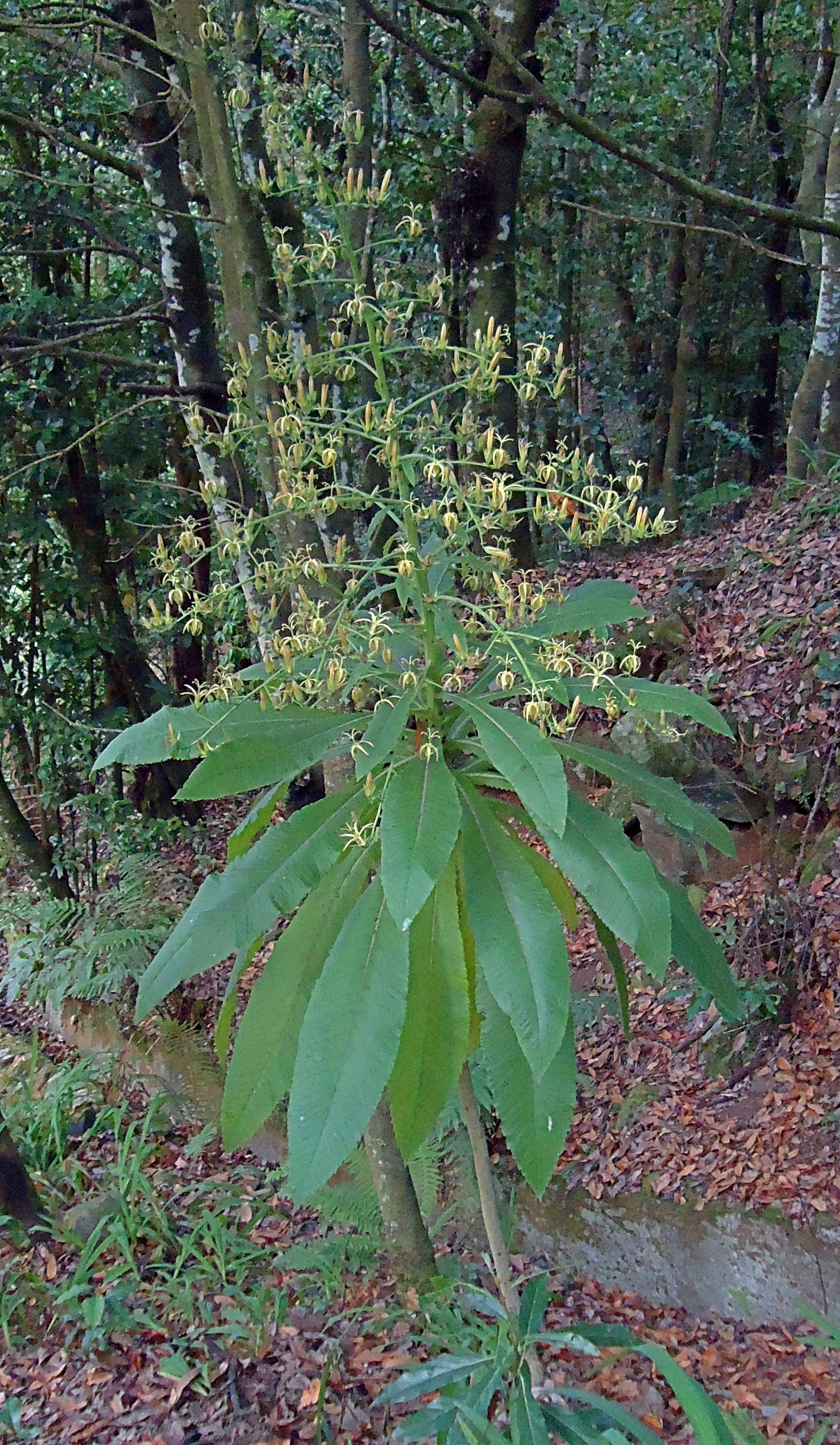

Conservation status
- Endangered (IUCN 3.1)

Scientific classification
- Kingdom: Plantae
- Clade: Tracheophytes
- Clade: Angiosperms
- Clade: Eudicots
- Clade: Asterids
- Order: Asterales
- Family: Campanulaceae
- Genus: Musschia
- Species: M. wollastonii

Binomial name
- Musschia wollastonii Lowe (1856)

= Musschia wollastonii =

Species of plant

Musschia wollastonii is a species of flowering plant in the Campanulaceae family. It is endemic to Madeira Island.

Musschia wollastonii grows in scattered locations between 400 and 900 meters elevation, mostly on the northern slope of the island. It grows in humid valleys in the shade of laurisilva forests, where Ocotea foetens is the dominant tree. The species' estimated extent of occurrence is 524 km^{2}.
