= Dialectica columellina =

Scientific classification
- Kingdom: Animalia
- Phylum: Arthropoda
- Class: Insecta
- Order: Lepidoptera
- Family: Gracillariidae
- Genus: Dialectica
- Species: D. columellina

Binomial name
- Dialectica columellina (Vári, 1961)

Synonyms
- Acrocercops columellina Vári, 1961

Species of moth

Dialectica columellina is a moth of the family Gracillariidae. It is known from South Africa.

The larvae feed on Pavonia columella. They probably mine the leaves of their host plant.
