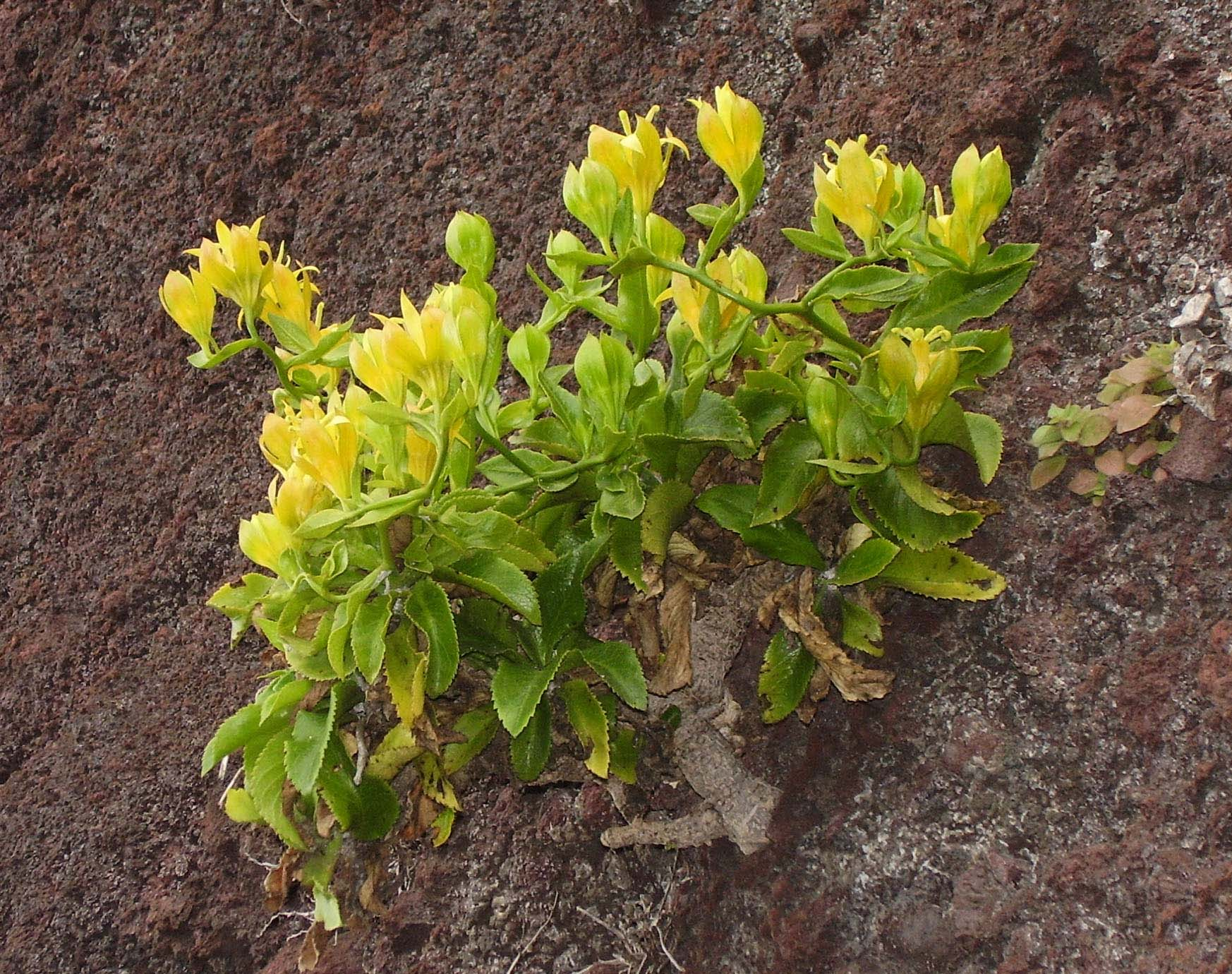

Conservation status
- Least Concern (IUCN 3.1)

Scientific classification
- Kingdom: Plantae
- Clade: Tracheophytes
- Clade: Angiosperms
- Clade: Eudicots
- Clade: Asterids
- Order: Asterales
- Family: Campanulaceae
- Genus: Musschia
- Species: M. aurea

Binomial name
- Musschia aurea (L.f.) Dumort. (1822)

Synonyms
- Benaurea sempervirens Raf. (1837); Campanula aurea L.f. (1782); Campanula aurea var. angustifolia Ker Gawl. (1815); Chrysangia aurea (L.f.) Link (1829); Musschia aurea var. angustifolia (Ker Gawl.) Dumort. (1822)

= Musschia aurea =

Species of flowering plant

Musschia aurea, is a species of flowering plant in the Campanulaceae family. It is endemic to the Madeira Islands, including Madeira and the Desertas. It grows on sea cliffs and rocky offshore islets.
