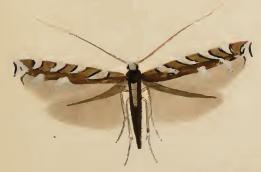

Scientific classification
- Kingdom: Animalia
- Phylum: Arthropoda
- Clade: Pancrustacea
- Class: Insecta
- Order: Lepidoptera
- Family: Gracillariidae
- Genus: Dialectica
- Species: D. imperialella

Binomial name
- Dialectica imperialella (Zeller, 1847)

Synonyms
- Gracilaria imperialella Zeller, 1847; Dialectica splendidella (Stainton, 1851)

= Dialectica imperialella =

Species of moth

Dialectica imperialella is a moth of the family Gracillariidae. It is found from Denmark to the Pyrenees, Italy and Romania and from Great Britain to Russia and Ukraine.

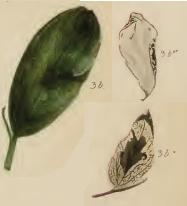
Mined leaves of Lathyrus niger (3b, 3b*, 3b**)

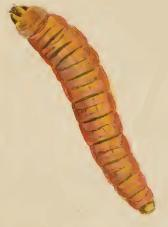
Larva

Adults are on wing in May and June in one generation.

The larvae feed on Buglossoides purpurocaerulea, Lithospermum officinale, Pulmonaria angustifolia, Pulmonaria officinalis and Symphytum officinale. They mine the leaves of their host plant.
