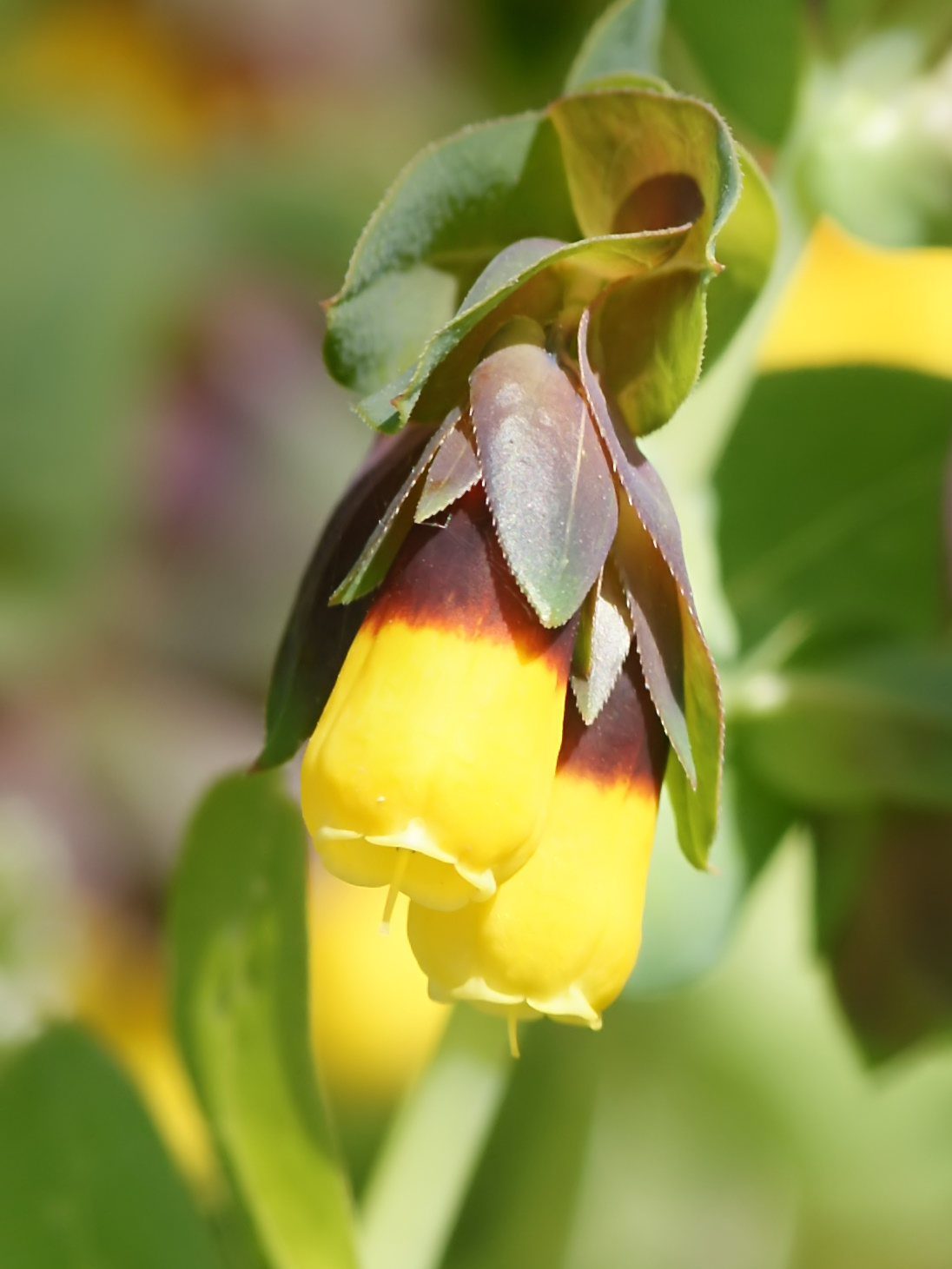
- Flowers of Cerinthe major

Scientific classification
- Kingdom: Plantae
- Clade: Tracheophytes
- Clade: Angiosperms
- Clade: Eudicots
- Clade: Asterids
- Order: Boraginales
- Family: Boraginaceae
- Subfamily: Boraginoideae
- Genus: Cerinthe; L.

Type species
- Cerinthe major L.

Synonyms
- Ceranthe (Rchb.) Opiz (1839)

= Cerinthe =

Genus of flowering plants in the borage family

Cerinthe is a genus of flowering plants in the family Boraginaceae, known as honeyworts. The genus is characterised by a calyx made up of separate, rather than fused, sepals, a tubular corolla, and the schizocarpic fruit that divides into two parts at maturity, unlike most members of the family, where the fruit splits into four nutlets. The genus has a circum-Mediterranean distribution, ranging from the Irano-Turanian Region in the east to Morocco in the west.

Cerinthe has been known since ancient times. An early reference to it is in John Gerard's The Herbal, published in 1597, describing its appearance, growth habits, time of blooming and mentions that "there is a taste as if it were of new wax in the floures [sic] or leaves chewed, as the name doth seeme [sic] to import." Gerard gives a list of other names for Cerinthe applied by prior writers, including Avicenna "Auicen", Pliny the Elder, Conrad Gessner, Rembert Dodoens, Carolus Clusius, and Matthias de l'Obel.

== Etymology ==
The genus name is a compound of the Greek elements κερί / κηρός (= keri / kēros or keeros) "(bees)wax" and άνθος (=anthos) "flower" – whence "wax flower" – from the belief that bees extracted wax from the blossoms to make their honeycombs.

== Species ==
Six species are accepted.

- Cerinthe glabra Mill.
- Cerinthe major L. Varieties include 'Purpurescens' with blue and purple flowers.
- Cerinthe minor L.
- Cerinthe palaestina Eig & Sam.
- Cerinthe retorta Sm.
- Cerinthe tenuiflora Bertol.
