= Dialectica permixtella =

Scientific classification
- Domain: Eukaryota
- Kingdom: Animalia
- Phylum: Arthropoda
- Class: Insecta
- Order: Lepidoptera
- Family: Gracillariidae
- Genus: Dialectica
- Species: D. permixtella

Binomial name
- Dialectica permixtella Walsingham, 1897

Species of moth

Dialectica permixtella is a moth of the family Gracillariidae. It is known from the Dominican Republic and Grenada.
