= Dialectica sanctaecrucis =

Scientific classification
- Domain: Eukaryota
- Kingdom: Animalia
- Phylum: Arthropoda
- Class: Insecta
- Order: Lepidoptera
- Family: Gracillariidae
- Genus: Dialectica
- Species: D. sanctaecrucis

Binomial name
- Dialectica sanctaecrucis Walsingham, 1897

Species of moth

Dialectica sanctaecrucis is a moth of the family Gracillariidae. It is known from Cuba, the Dominican Republic, Jamaica, Puerto Rico, the Virgin Islands (Saint John, Saint Croix and Saint Thomas) and the Galápagos Islands.

The larvae feed on Solanum melongena and Solanum torvum. They probably mine the leaves of their host plant.

== Subspecies ==
- Dialectica sanctaecrucis sanctaecrucis
- Dialectica sanctaecrucis darwini Landry, 2006 (Galápagos Islands)
