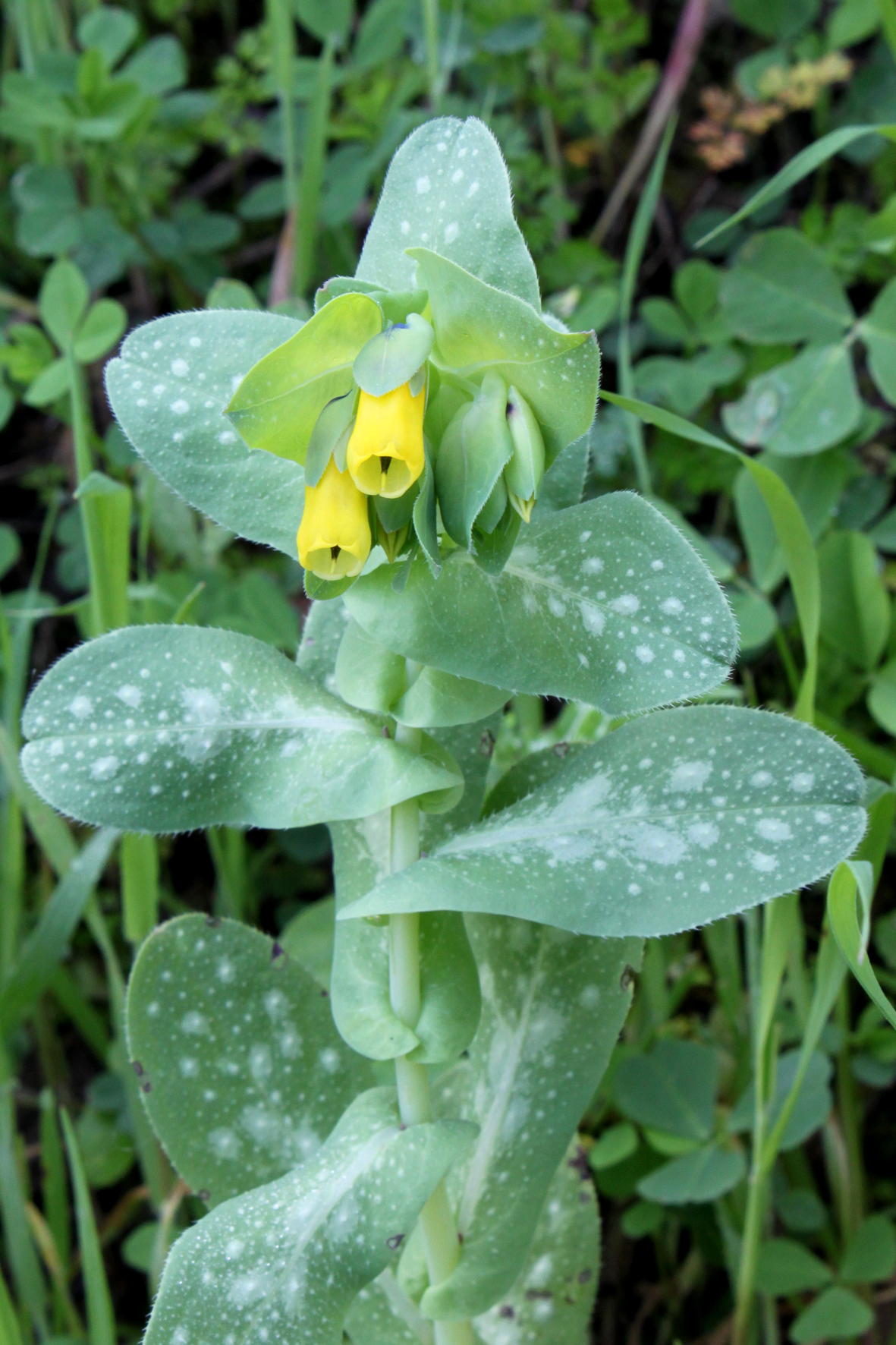
- In bloom
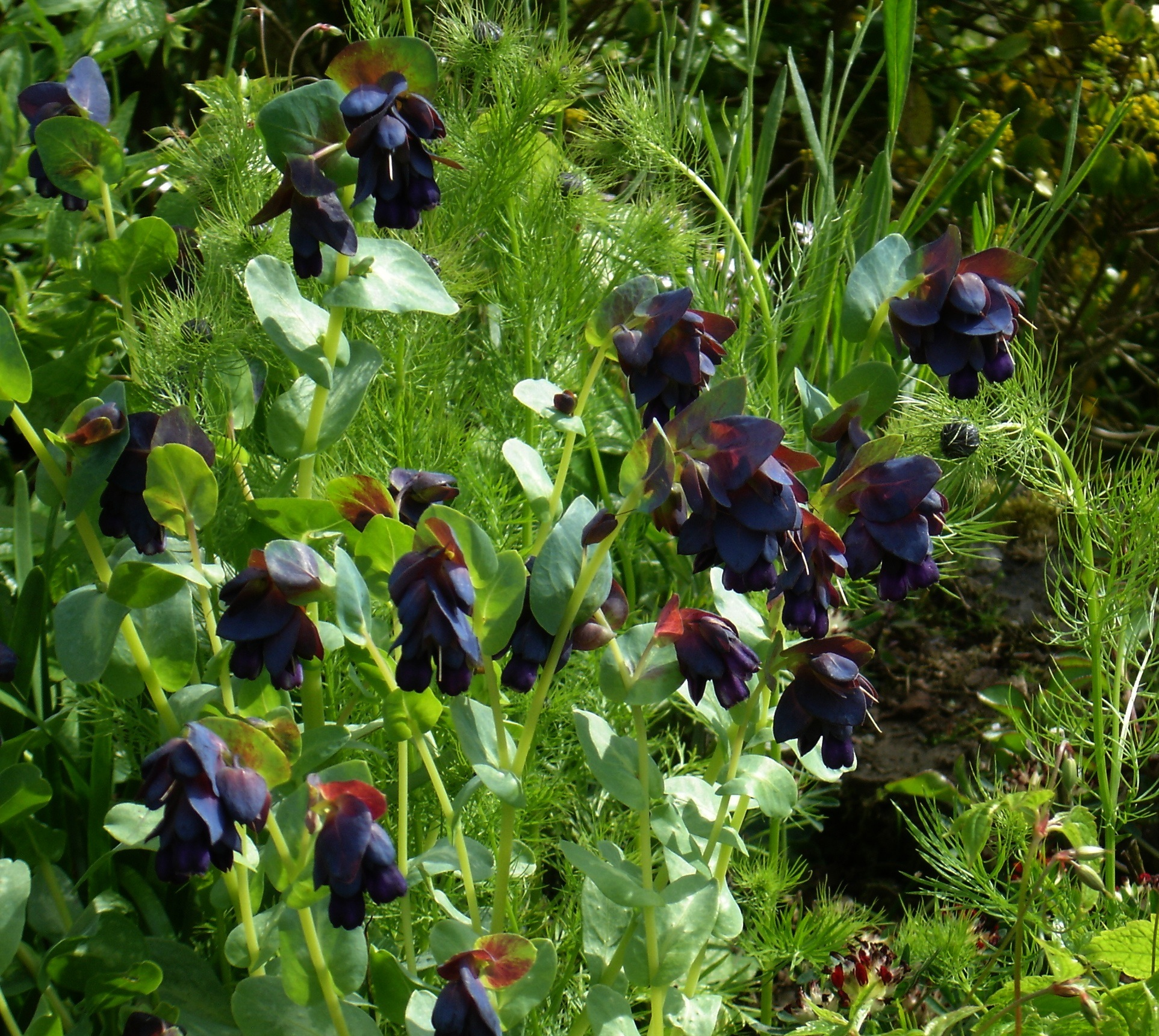
- A particularly dark cultivar of Cerinthe major subsp. purpurascens

Scientific classification
- Kingdom: Plantae
- Clade: Embryophytes
- Clade: Tracheophytes
- Clade: Angiosperms
- Clade: Eudicots
- Clade: Asterids
- Order: Boraginales
- Family: Boraginaceae
- Genus: Cerinthe
- Species: C. major

Binomial name
- Cerinthe major L.

Synonyms
- List: Ceranthe acuta (Moench) Opiz; Cerinthe acuta Moench; Cerinthe alpina Vis.; Cerinthe aperta Lojac.; Cerinthe aperta Clairv.; Cerinthe aspera Roth; Cerinthe glabra subsp. longiflora (Viv.) Kerguélen; Cerinthe glauca Moench; Cerinthe gymnandra Gasp.; Cerinthe gymnandra Tod. ex Lojac.; Cerinthe gymnandra var. quichiotis Carrasco; Cerinthe longiflora Viv.; Cerinthe major var. elegans Fiori; Cerinthe major subsp. elegans (Fiori) Giardina & Raimondo; Cerinthe major f. pseudopallida Pamp.; Cerinthe major f. pseudosemipurpurea Pamp.; Cerinthe strigosa Rchb.; Cerinthe versicolor Hallier ex Steud.

= Cerinthe major =

Species of flowering plant

Cerinthe major, called honeywort along with other members of its genus, is an annual species of flowering plant in the family Boraginaceae, native to the Mediterranean region (southern Europe, western Asia and northern Africa), and introduced to New Zealand. Gardeners have a choice along a spectrum of cultivars ranging from Cerinthe major subsp. major, with sea-green bracts and yellow flowers, to Cerinthe major subsp. purpurascens with blue bracts and purple flowers.

== Subspecies ==
The following subspecies are currently accepted:

- Cerinthe major subsp. major
- Cerinthe major subsp. oranensis (Batt.) Selvi & L.Cecchi
- Cerinthe major subsp. purpurascens (Boiss.) Selvi & L.Cecchi

== Flowering ==
In Europe, it flowers between May and August.

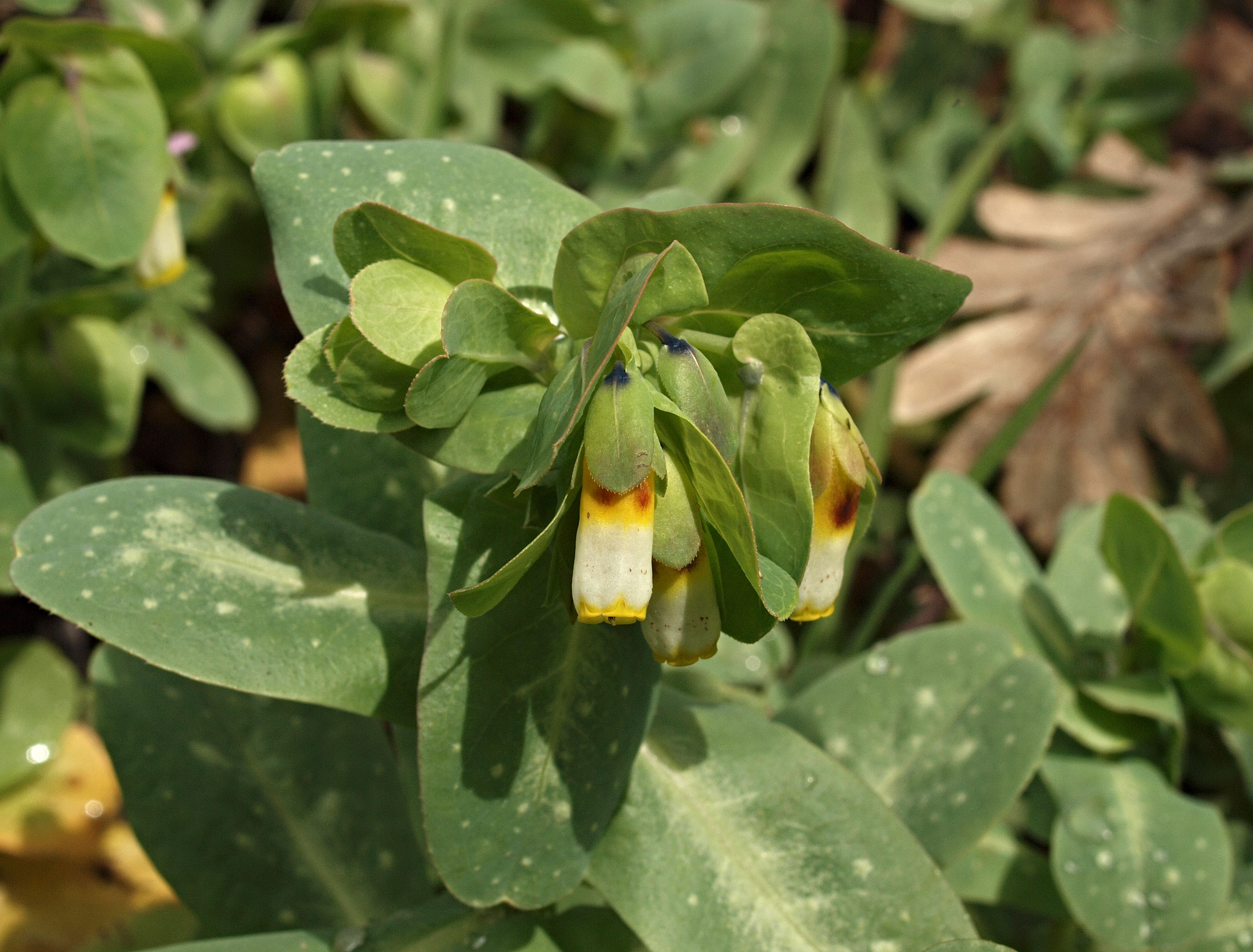
The synonymous Cerinthe gymnandra with white flowers

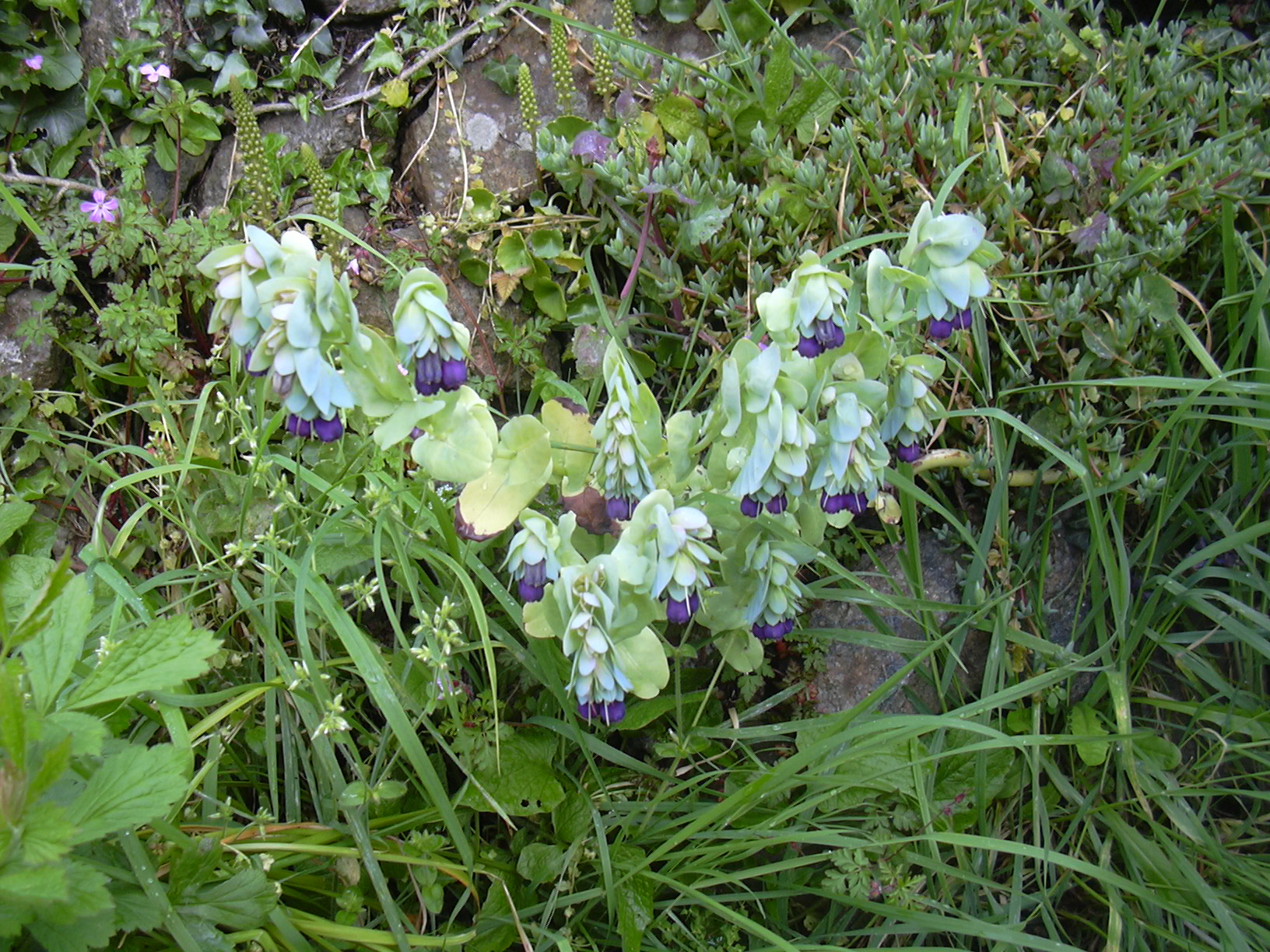
In a garden setting

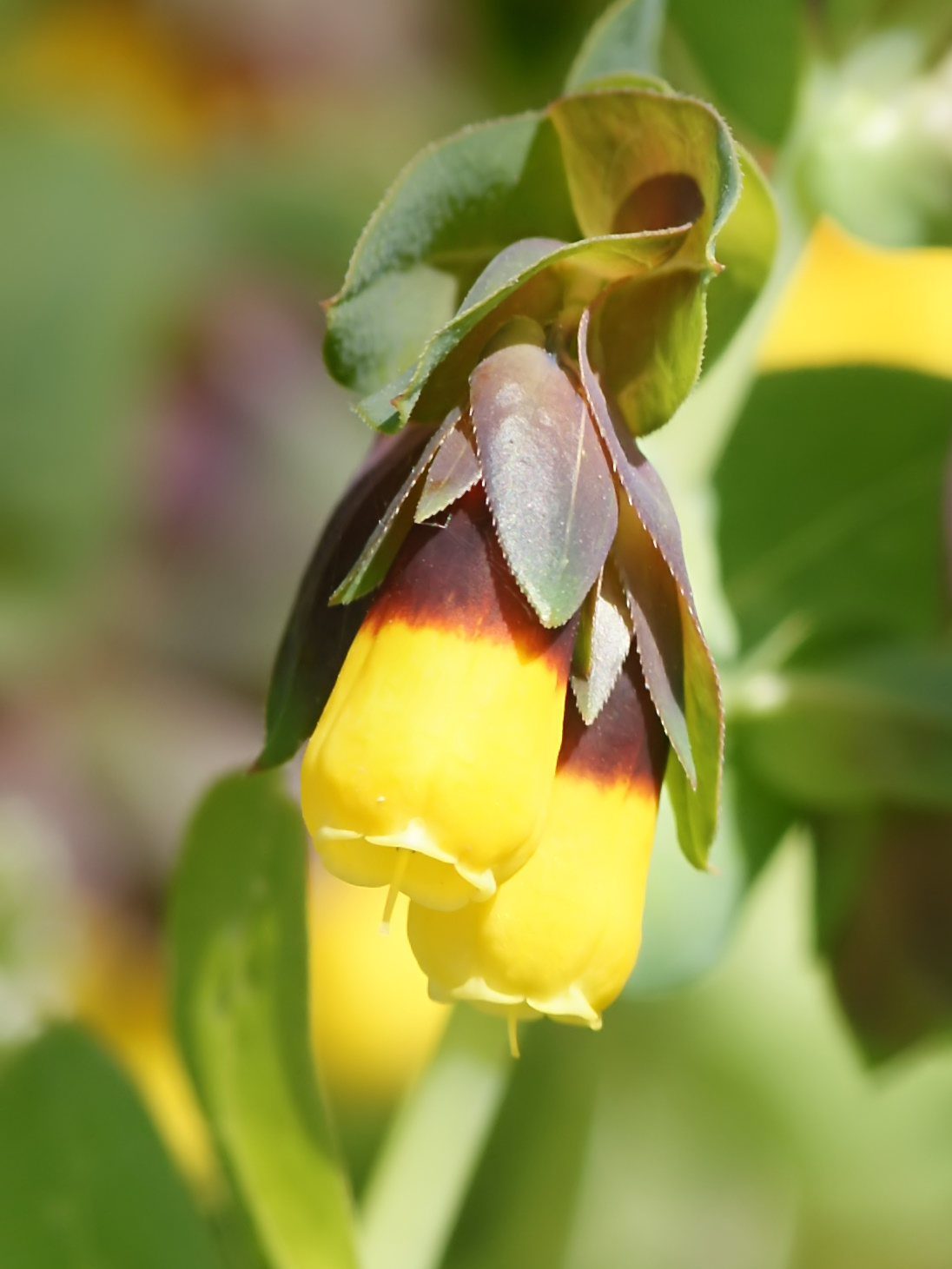
Close-up of flower

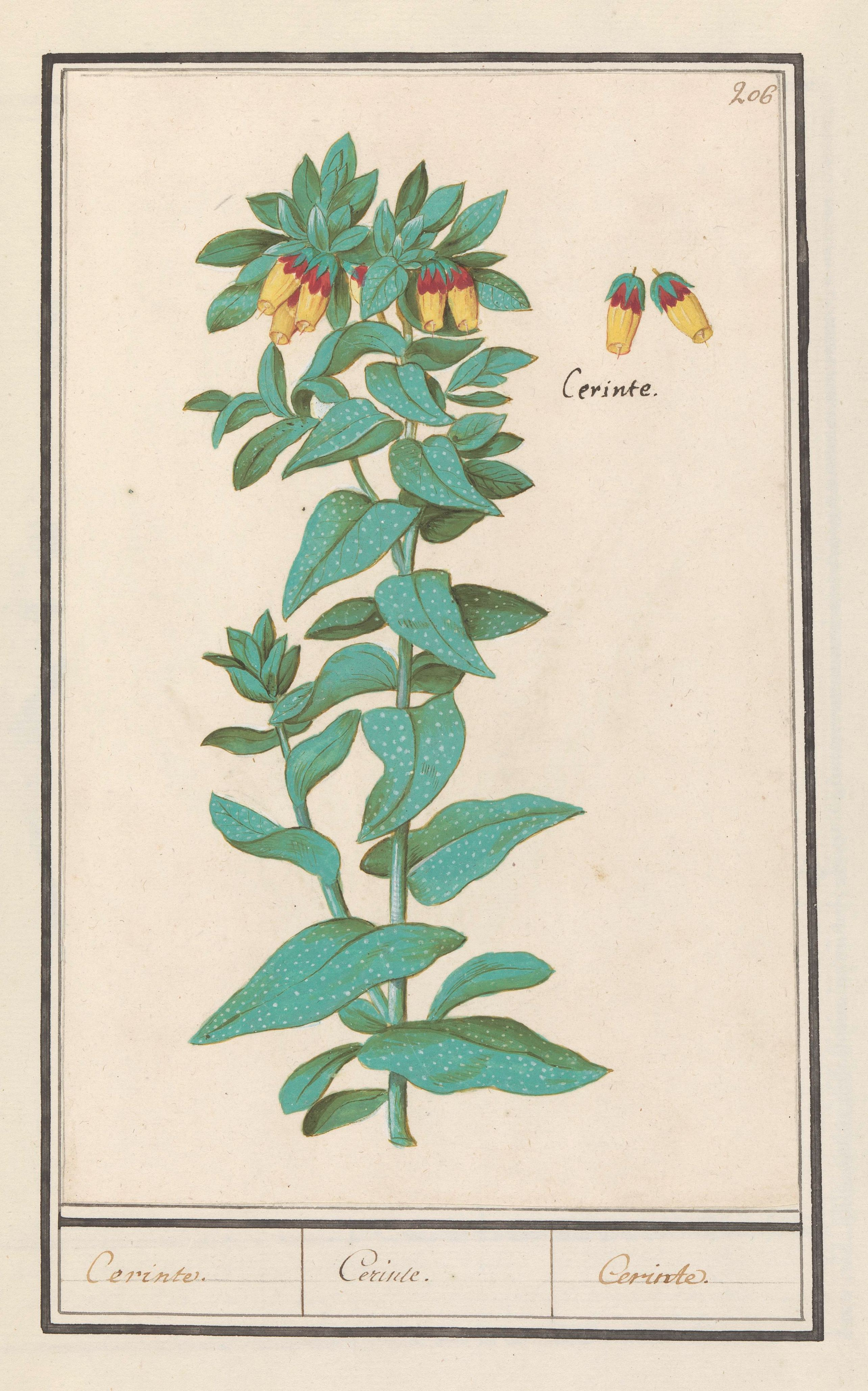
Botanical illustration
