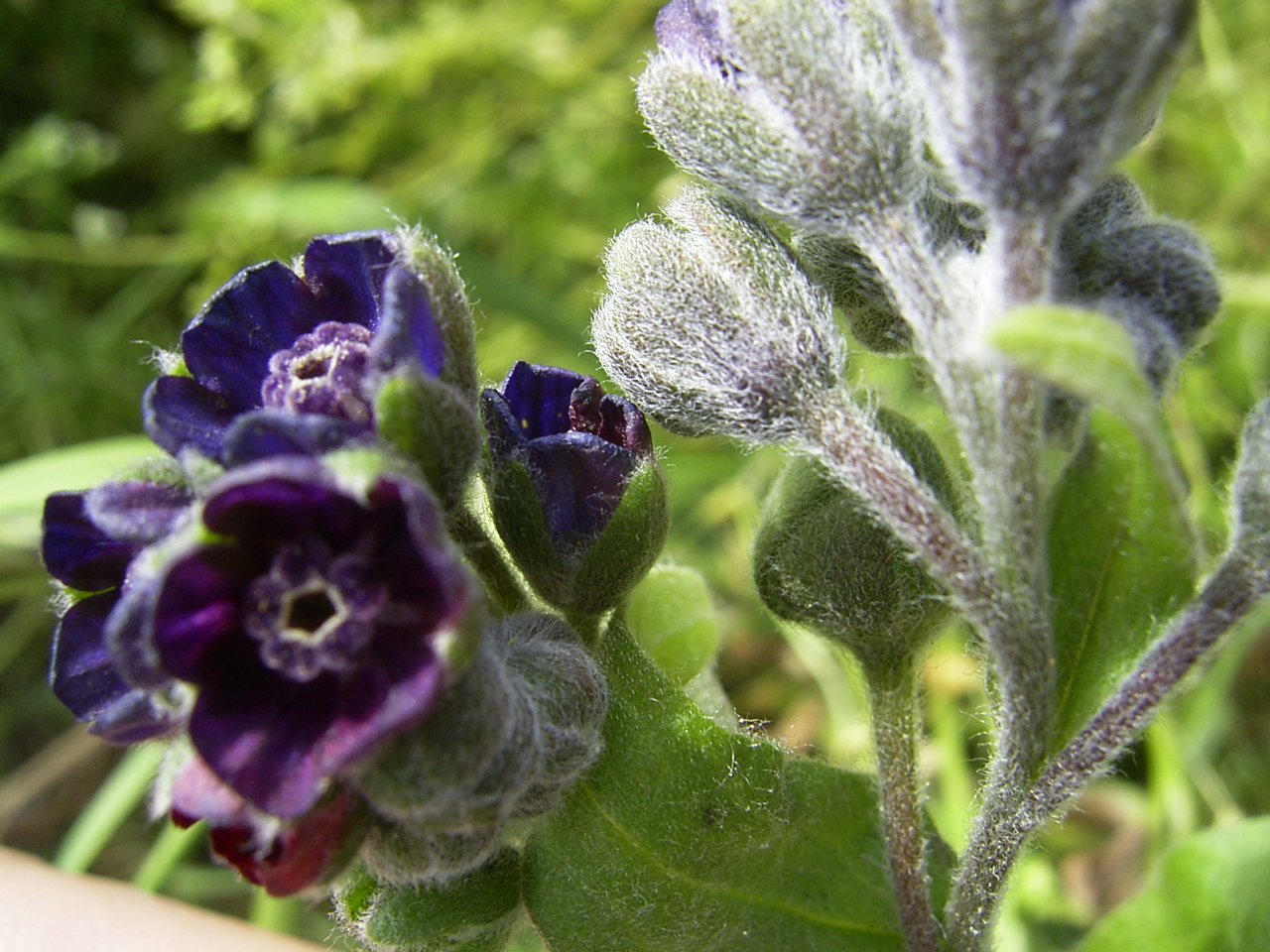
- Cynoglossum officinale

Scientific classification
- Kingdom: Plantae
- Clade: Tracheophytes
- Clade: Angiosperms
- Clade: Eudicots
- Clade: Asterids
- Order: Boraginales
- Family: Boraginaceae
- Subfamily: Boraginoideae
- Genus: Cynoglossum; L. (1753)

Type species
- Cynoglossum officinale L.

Synonyms
- Mapuchea Serrano, R.Carbajal & S.Ortiz (2016); Paracynoglossum Popov (1953); Pardoglossum E.Barbier & Mathez (1973)

= Cynoglossum =

Genus of flowering plants in the borage family

Cynoglossum is a genus of small-flowered plants in the family Boraginaceae (borage family). It includes 81 species native to Eurasia, Africa, New Guinea, and Australia.

Cynoglossum officinale, the common hound's-tongue, is a native of Asia, Africa, and Europe. It has been introduced into North America, and it is considered to be a troublesome weed because its burs stick to the wool of sheep and to other animals. Houndstongue is also toxic to cattle and other grazing animals due to the presence of pyrrolizidine alkaloids, which when ingested can lead to liver damage and photosensitivity in livestock.

== Species ==
As of July 2024, there are 81 accepted species in the genus:

- Cynoglossum aequinoctiale T.C.E.Fr.
- Cynoglossum alpestre Ohwi
- Cynoglossum alpinum (Brand) Riedl
- Cynoglossum alticola Hilliard & B.L.Burtt
- Cynoglossum amabile Stapf & J.R.Drumm. — Chinese hound's tongue
- Cynoglossum amplifolium Hochst. ex A.DC.
- Cynoglossum asperrimum Nakai
- Cynoglossum australe R.Br.
- Cynoglossum × austriacum Rech.
- Cynoglossum austroafricanum Hilliard & B.L.Burtt
- Cynoglossum baeticum Sutorý
- Cynoglossum barbaricinum Arrigoni & Selvi
- Cynoglossum birkinshawii J.S.Mill.
- Cynoglossum borbonicum (Lam.) Bory
- Cynoglossum bottae Deflers
- Cynoglossum brandii Sutorý
- Cynoglossum castaneum Riedl
- Cynoglossum celebicum Brand
- Cynoglossum cernuum Baker
- Cynoglossum cheirifolium L.
- Cynoglossum cheranganiense Verdc.
- Cynoglossum clandestinum Desf.
- Cynoglossum coeruleum Hochst. ex A.DC.
- Cynoglossum columnae Ten.
- Cynoglossum creticum Mill. — blue hound's tongue
- Cynoglossum dalianum Sutorý
- Cynoglossum densefoliatum Chiov.
- Cynoglossum dioscoridis Vill.
- Cynoglossum divaricatum Stephan ex Lehm.
- Cynoglossum formosanum Nakai
- Cynoglossum gansuense Y.L.Liu
- Cynoglossum germanicum Jacq. — green hound's tongue
- Cynoglossum glabellum Riedl
- Cynoglossum hanangense Verdc.
- Cynoglossum hellwigii Brand
- Cynoglossum hispidum Thunb.
- Cynoglossum holosericeum Steven
- Cynoglossum inyangense E.S.Martins
- Cynoglossum javanicum (Lehm.) A.DC.
- Cynoglossum kandavanense (Bornm. & Gauba) Akhani
- Cynoglossum karamojense Verdc.
- Cynoglossum krasniqii Wraber
- Cynoglossum lanceolatum Forssk.
- Cynoglossum × legionense Rothm.
- Cynoglossum lowryanum J.S.Mill.
- Cynoglossum macrocalycinum Riedl
- Cynoglossum macrolimbe Riedl
- Cynoglossum magellense Ten.
- Cynoglossum maghrebicum Sutorý
- Cynoglossum mathezii Greuter & Burdet
- Cynoglossum mediterraneum Sutorý
- Cynoglossum meeboldii Brand
- Cynoglossum microglochin Benth.
- Cynoglossum × modorense Rech.
- Cynoglossum monophlebium Baker
- Cynoglossum montanum L.
- Cynoglossum natolicum (Bornm.) Sutorý
- Cynoglossum nebrodense Guss.
- Cynoglossum nova-guineese Riedl
- Cynoglossum obtusicalyx Retief & A.E.van Wyk
- Cynoglossum officinale L. — common hound's tongue
- Cynoglossum papuanum Schltr. ex O.Brand
- Cynoglossum pitardianum Greuter & Burdet
- Cynoglossum pustulatum Boiss.
- Cynoglossum rochelia A.DC.
- Cynoglossum sabirense (R.R.Mill & A.G.Mill.) J.R.I.Wood
- Cynoglossum semnanicum Khat.
- Cynoglossum seravshanicum (B.Fedtsch.) Popov
- Cynoglossum spelaeum Hilliard & B.L.Burtt
- Cynoglossum sphacioticum Boiss. & Heldr.
- Cynoglossum stewartii Kazmi
- Cynoglossum timorense Riedl
- Cynoglossum torvum Dimon & M.A.M.Renner
- Cynoglossum trinervium (Duthie) Greuter & Stier
- Cynoglossum trollii Melch.
- Cynoglossum tsaratananense J.S.Mill.
- Cynoglossum tubiflorum (Murb.) Greuter & Burdet
- Cynoglossum ukaguruense Verdc.
- Cynoglossum vanense Sutorý
- Cynoglossum viridiflorum Pall. ex Lehm.
- Cynoglossum wallichii G.Don
- Cynoglossum watieri (Batt. & Maire) Braun-Blanq. & Maire
- Cynoglossum wildii E.S.Martins
- Cynoglossum yemenense (R.R.Mill & A.G.Mill.) Verdc.
- Cynoglossum zeylanicum (Sw. ex Lehm.) Thunb. ex Brand — Ceylon hound's tongue

=== Formerly placed here ===
- Oncaglossum pringlei (Greenm.) Sutorý (as Cynoglossum pringlei Greenm.)

== Gallery ==
Cynoglossum creticum, synonym of Cyneglossum Pictum or Madeira Hound’s Tongue: botanical print from the Curtis's Botanical Magazine, 1820.
