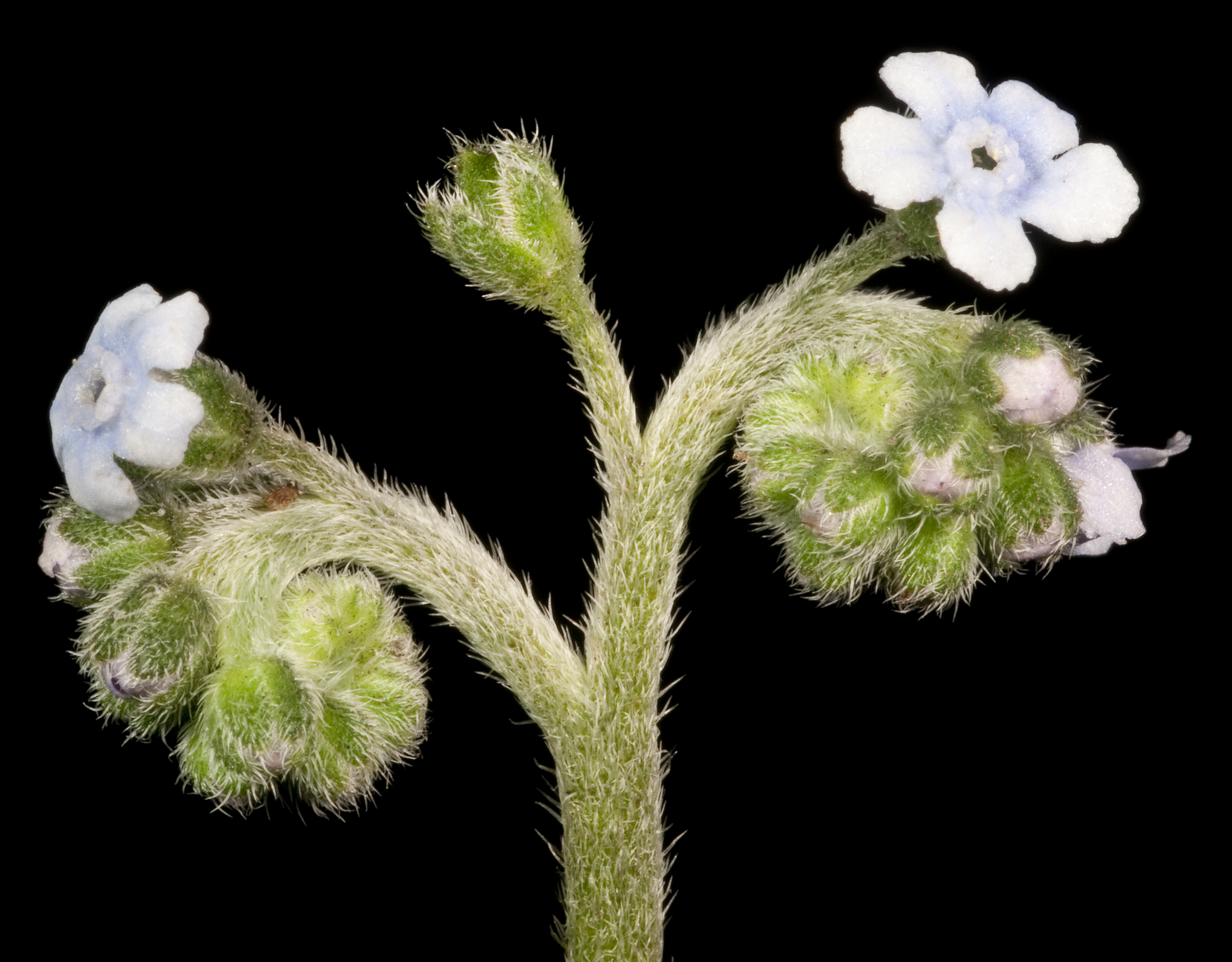

Scientific classification
- Kingdom: Plantae
- Clade: Tracheophytes
- Clade: Angiosperms
- Clade: Eudicots
- Clade: Asterids
- Order: Boraginales
- Family: Boraginaceae
- Genus: Cynoglossum
- Species: C. australe

Binomial name
- Cynoglossum australe R.Br.

= Cynoglossum australe =

Australian hound's tongue

Species of flowering plant

Cynoglossum australe commonly known as the Australian hound's tongue, is a flowering plant in the family Boraginaceae. It is a perennial herb with blue, pink or whitish flowers found in most states of Australia.

== Description ==
Cynoglossum australe is an upright herb 30–75 cm (12–30 in) high, occasionally taller, with stems covered in stiff, backward or downward spreading hairs. Lower leaves are lance to spoon-shaped, flat, 6–20 cm (2.4–7.9 in) long, 10–35 mm (0.39–1.38 in) wide on a petiole 2–10 cm (0.79–3.94 in) long, becoming sessile, wedge-shaped at the base, a pointed apex and decreasing in size near the flowers. The corolla is blue, sometimes pink or whitish, 3–6 mm (0.12–0.24 in) long, pedicel 2–5 mm (0.079–0.197 in) long, sepals elliptic-shaped to almost triangular, rounded or blunt and enlarging as the fruit ages. Flowering occurs mostly in spring and summer and the fruit is a flattened, oval to globe-shaped schizocarp, light brown to yellowish-brown, 2.5–3.5 mm (0.098–0.138 in) long and covered in spines of varying length on the lower surface.

== Taxonomy and naming ==
Cynoglossum australe was first formally described in 1810 by Robert Brown and the description was published in Prodromus florae Novae Hollandiae. The specific epithet (australe) means "Australian".

== Distribution and habitat ==
Australian hound's tongue is a widespread species found growing in a diverse range of locations including woodland, grassland, sand dunes and montane forest in Queensland, Victoria, New South Wales, Western Australia and the Australian Capital Territory.
