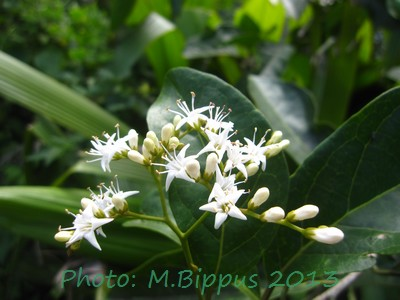
- Ehretia cymosa flowers

Scientific classification
- Kingdom: Plantae
- Clade: Embryophytes
- Clade: Tracheophytes
- Clade: Angiosperms
- Clade: Eudicots
- Clade: Asterids
- Order: Boraginales
- Family: Ehretiaceae
- Genus: Ehretia
- Species: E. cymosa

Binomial name
- Ehretia cymosa (Thonn.)

= Ehretia cymosa =

Species of tree

Ehretia cymosa is a small tree belonging to the family Ehretiaceae. It occurs over a wide range of habitat throughout of western, central and eastern Africa, including Benin, Côte d'Ivoire, Cameroon, Ethiopia, Kenya, Comoros, Madagascar, Mascarenes, Zimbabwe and Mozambique.

== Other names ==
Local names for this plant include Mpelu, Mnemvu (Tanzania), Murembu (Meru), Shekutu (Luhya), Yambu (Chagga), Mororwet (Nandy), Alébé (Baoulé), Bélékou, Blikou (Gouro), Grakou (Shien), Labassa (Ewé), Zomena, Zomali (Adja), Zoma, Zozoma, Myonma (Fon), Myoma (Sahouè), Jáà (Yoruba), and Ulaagaa (Arsi).

Leaves & roots are used for medical uses in traditional medicine.
