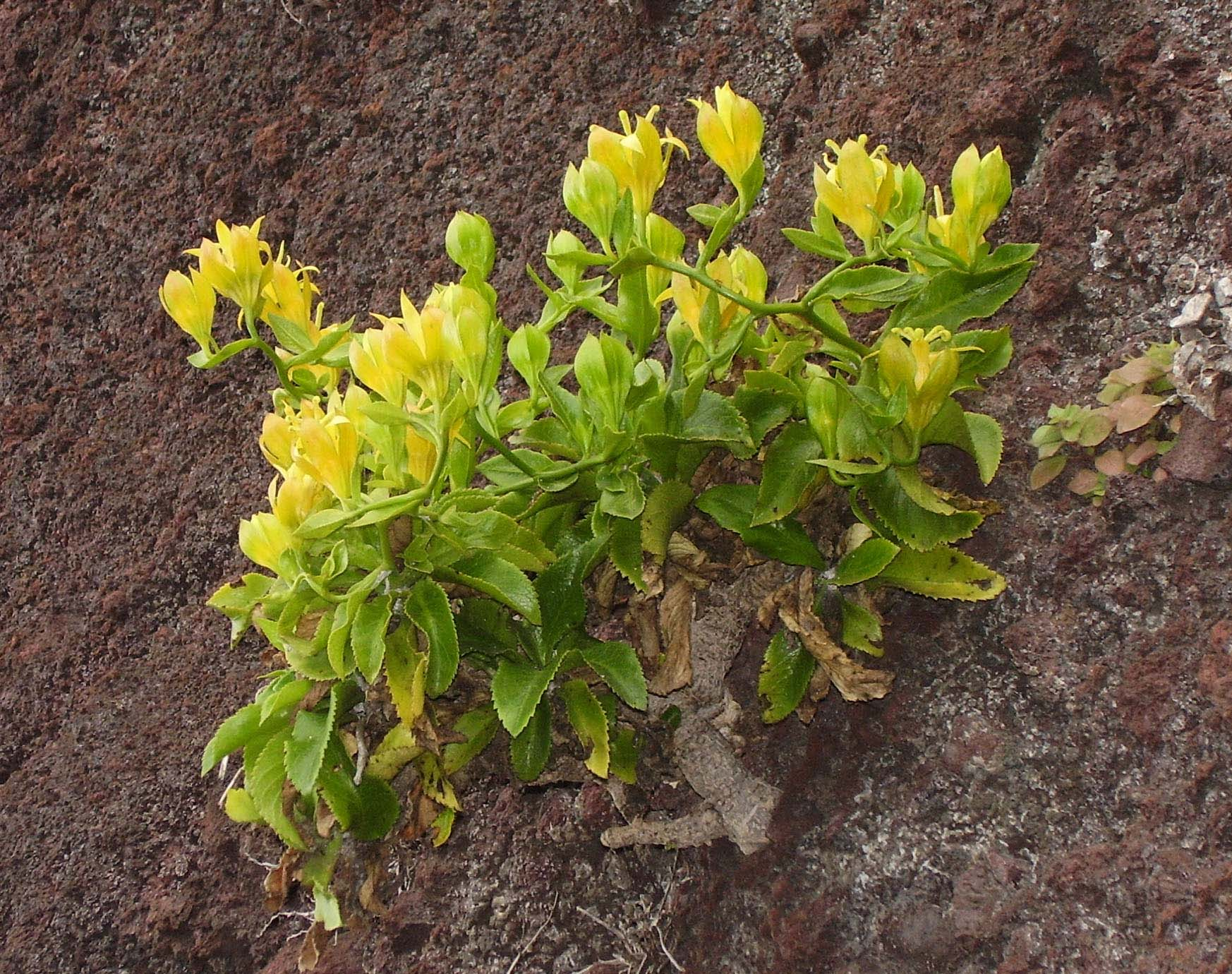
- Musschia aurea

Scientific classification
- Kingdom: Plantae
- Clade: Tracheophytes
- Clade: Angiosperms
- Clade: Eudicots
- Clade: Asterids
- Order: Asterales
- Family: Campanulaceae
- Subfamily: Campanuloideae
- Genus: Musschia; Dumort. (1822)

Type species
- Musschia aurea (L.f.) Dumort.
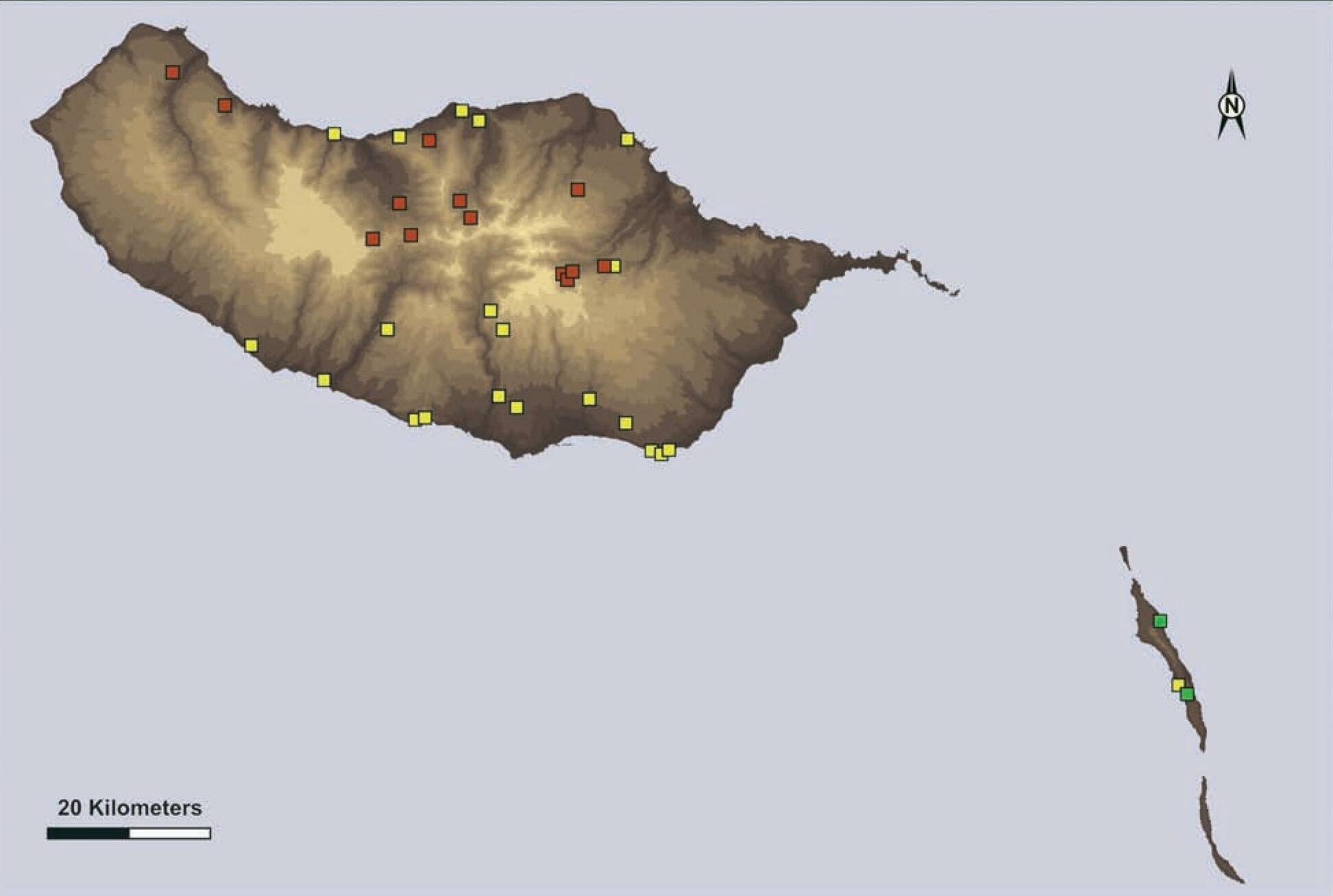
- Distribution of the genus: M. isambertoi (green), M. wollastonii (red), M. aurea (yellow)

Synonyms
- Benaurea Raf. (1837); Chrysangia Link (1829)

= Musschia =

Genus of flowering plants

Musschia is a genus of plants in the family Campanulaceae. It contains three known species, all endemic to the Madeira Archipelago in the eastern North Atlantic, part of the Republic of Portugal. The genus is named in honour of Jean-Henri Mussche (1765–1834), the head gardener of the botanical garden in Ghent. (Note: Many sources claim he was the director, but this is incorrect. Director was Bernard Coppens and he was "hortulanus" or head gardener.)

- Musschia aurea (L.f.) Dumort. - Madeira Island
- Musschia isambertoi M.Seq., R.Jardim, Magda Silva & L.Carvalho - Desertas Islands
- Musschia wollastonii Lowe - Madeira Island
