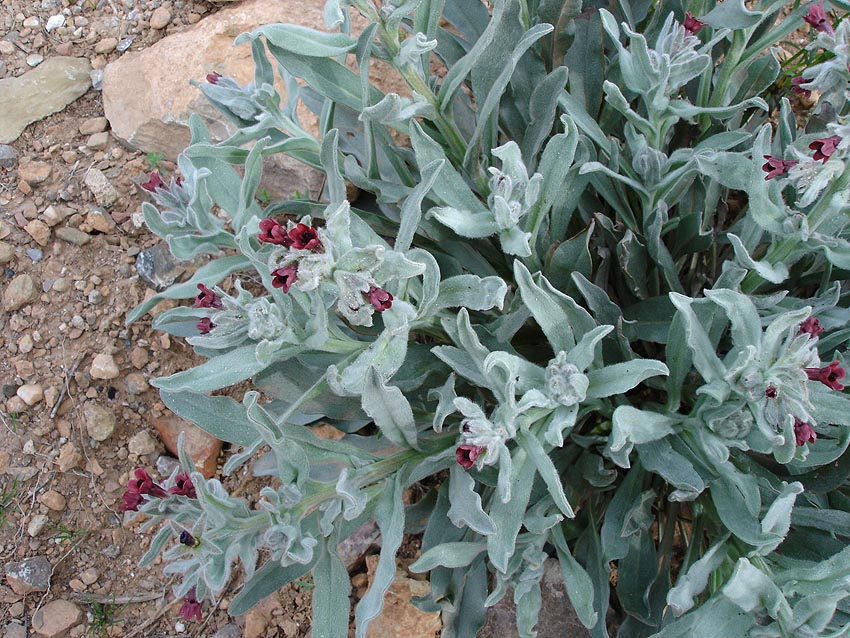

Scientific classification
- Kingdom: Plantae
- Clade: Tracheophytes
- Clade: Angiosperms
- Clade: Eudicots
- Clade: Asterids
- Order: Boraginales
- Family: Boraginaceae
- Genus: Cynoglossum
- Species: C. cheirifolium

Binomial name
- Cynoglossum cheirifolium L. (1753)

Subspecies
- Cynoglossum cheirifolium subsp. cheirifolium; Cynoglossum cheirifolium subsp. heterocarpum (Kunze) Maire

Synonyms
- Pardoglossum cheirifolium (L.) E.Barbier & Mathez (1973)

= Cynoglossum cheirifolium =

Genus of plants

Cynoglossum cheirifolium is a species of flowering plant belonging to the family Boraginaceae. It is an herbaceous biennial native to the western and central Mediterranean Basin, including Portugal, Spain, France, the Italian Peninsula, Sardinia, Sicily, and Greece in southern Europe, and Morocco, Algeria, Tunisia, and Libya in North Africa .

Two subspecies are accepted:

- Cynoglossum cheirifolium subsp. cheirifolium (synonyms Cynoglossum argenteum Lam., C. clavatum Viv., C. decipiens Lojac., and C. lineatum Risso ex Ces., Pass. & Gibert) – Portugal, Spain, France, Italy, Sardinia, Sicily, and Greece
- Cynoglossum cheirifolium subsp. heterocarpum (Kunze) Maire (synonyms Cynoglossum heterocarpum (Kunze) Willk., C. arundanum Coss., and C. controversum Sennen) – Spain, Morocco, Algeria, Tunisia, and Libya
