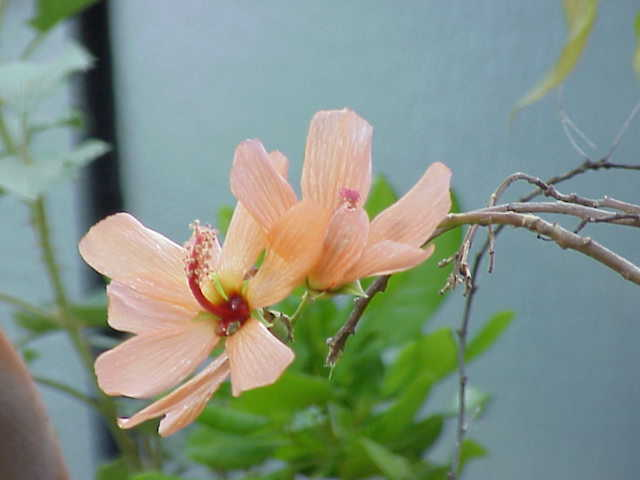
- Malva phoenicea flowers

Scientific classification
- Kingdom: Plantae
- Clade: Tracheophytes
- Clade: Angiosperms
- Clade: Eudicots
- Clade: Rosids
- Order: Malvales
- Family: Malvaceae
- Genus: Malva
- Species: M. phoenicea

Binomial name
- Malva phoenicea (Vent.) Alef.

Synonyms
- Lavatera phoenicea Vent.; Althaea phoenicea Kuntze, Lavatera coccinea Dietr. ex DC; Navaea phoenicea Webb. & Berthel.

= Malva phoenicea =

Species of flowering plant

Malva phoenicea, often still known under the synonyms Lavatera phoenicea and Navaea phoenicea, is a large shrub of the family Malvaceae and tribe Malveae, endemic to the island of Tenerife in the Canary Islands.

== Taxonomy ==
In 1805 this species was described as Lavatera phoenicea by Étienne Pierre Ventenat. In 1836 Webb and Berthelot separated this plant from other Lavatera in a new, then monotypic genus Navaea, named for Alonso de Nava y Grimón (1757–1832), founder of the botanical garden in Puerto de la Cruz, Tenerife (Jardín de Aclimatación de la Orotava). The reason for including this species in a separate genus was the presence of nectaries in the base of each petal, which is unique in the tribe Malveae. Published studies using molecular markers (chloroplast and ITS sequences) support this separation, as phylogenetic trees show M. phoenicea in a basal position in relation to the rest of Lavatera-Malva complex, which would indicate it arrived on the islands in the distant past, when the genus Malva was just beginning to differentiate.

== Distribution ==
M. phoenicea is very rare and it is threatened. It grows only in northern cliffs in the massifs of Anaga and Teno, on Tenerife.

== Ecology ==
This plant presents a clear bird pollination syndrome, a phenomenon shared with another 12 Macaronesian endemics (genus Musschia, Lotus, Isoplexis, Canarina, Echium and Scrophularia). This bird pollination syndrome is pretty rare in these latitudes and seems to have independent origins according to phylogenies of each lineage.

== Conservation ==
Legally, the regional government declared the species to be a "protected plant" in 1991 and the species was listed in the 2001 Catálogo de Especies Amenazadas de Canarias, these law were superseded by the 2010 Catálogo Canario de Especies Protegidas law in which it was included in as a plant 'important to the ecosystems of the Canary Islands'.

It has not been assessed by the IUCN. The species was first assessed according to the IUCN standards in 2000 with the status of 'endangered', in 2004 as 'vulnerable' and in 2008 as 'endangered' again. A Spanish government publication already identified it as endangered in 1984, as did a regional government publication in 1996.
