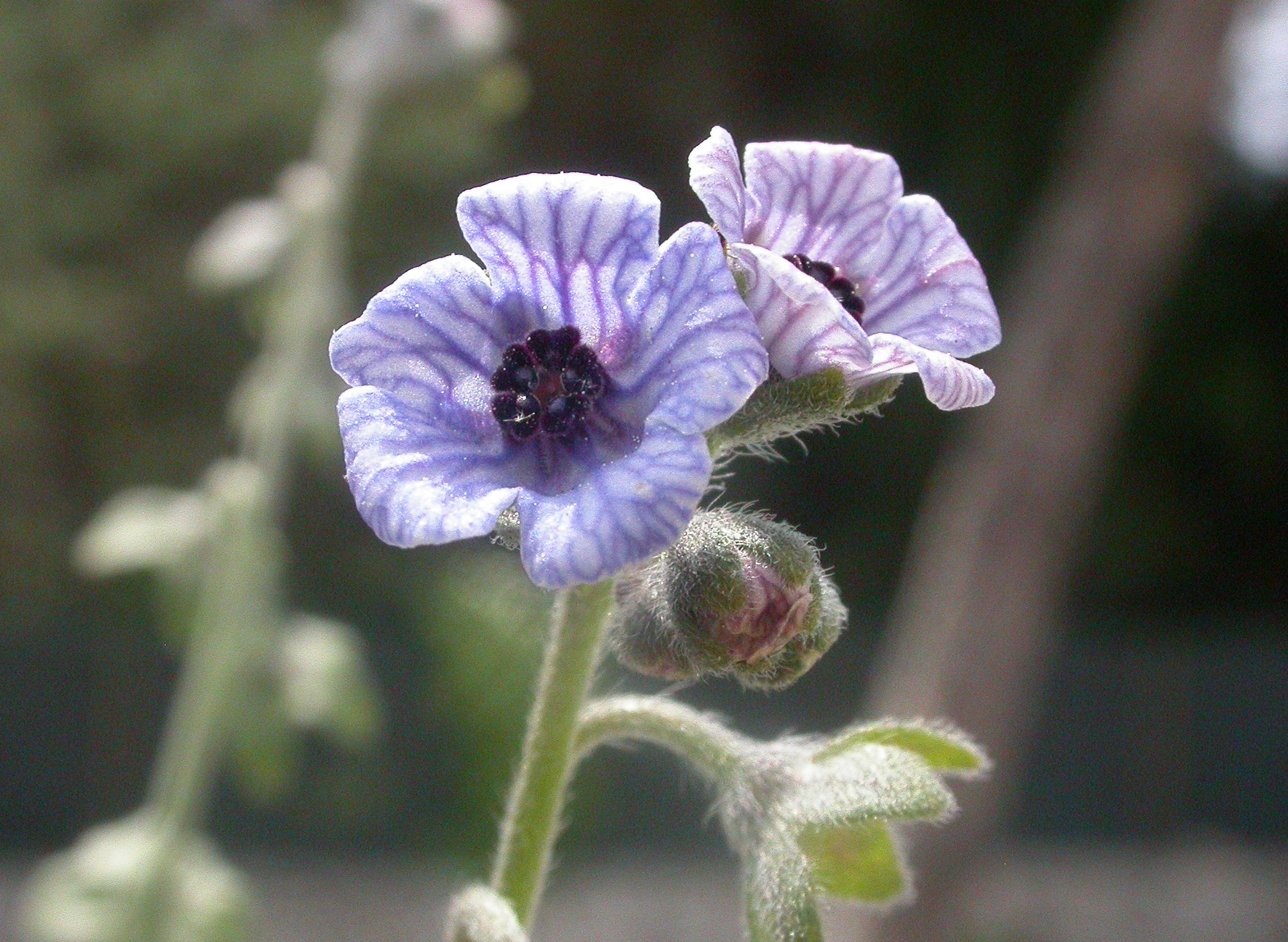
- In Monte Gargano, Italy

Scientific classification
- Kingdom: Plantae
- Clade: Tracheophytes
- Clade: Angiosperms
- Clade: Eudicots
- Clade: Asterids
- Order: Boraginales
- Family: Boraginaceae
- Genus: Cynoglossum
- Species: C. creticum

Binomial name
- Cynoglossum creticum Mill.

Synonyms
- Cynoglossum amplexicaule Lam.; Cynoglossum atlanticum Murb.; Cynoglossum henricksonii L.C.Higgins; Cynoglossum molle Phil.; Cynoglossum pallidiflorum Grecescu; Cynoglossum pictum Aiton; Cynoglossum siculum Guss

= Cynoglossum creticum =

Species of flowering plant

Cynoglossum creticum is a plant in the family Boraginaceae.

It is native to the Mediterranean Basin, including the island of Crete. It is also found as an invasive plant in the US states of Texas and Missouri, where it is known as blue hound's tongue.

Cynoglossum Pictum also known as Madeira Hound’s Tongue and synonym of Cyneglossum creticum: botanical print from the Curtis's Botanical Magazine, 1820. Copper engraving by Weddell from an illustration by J Curtis.
