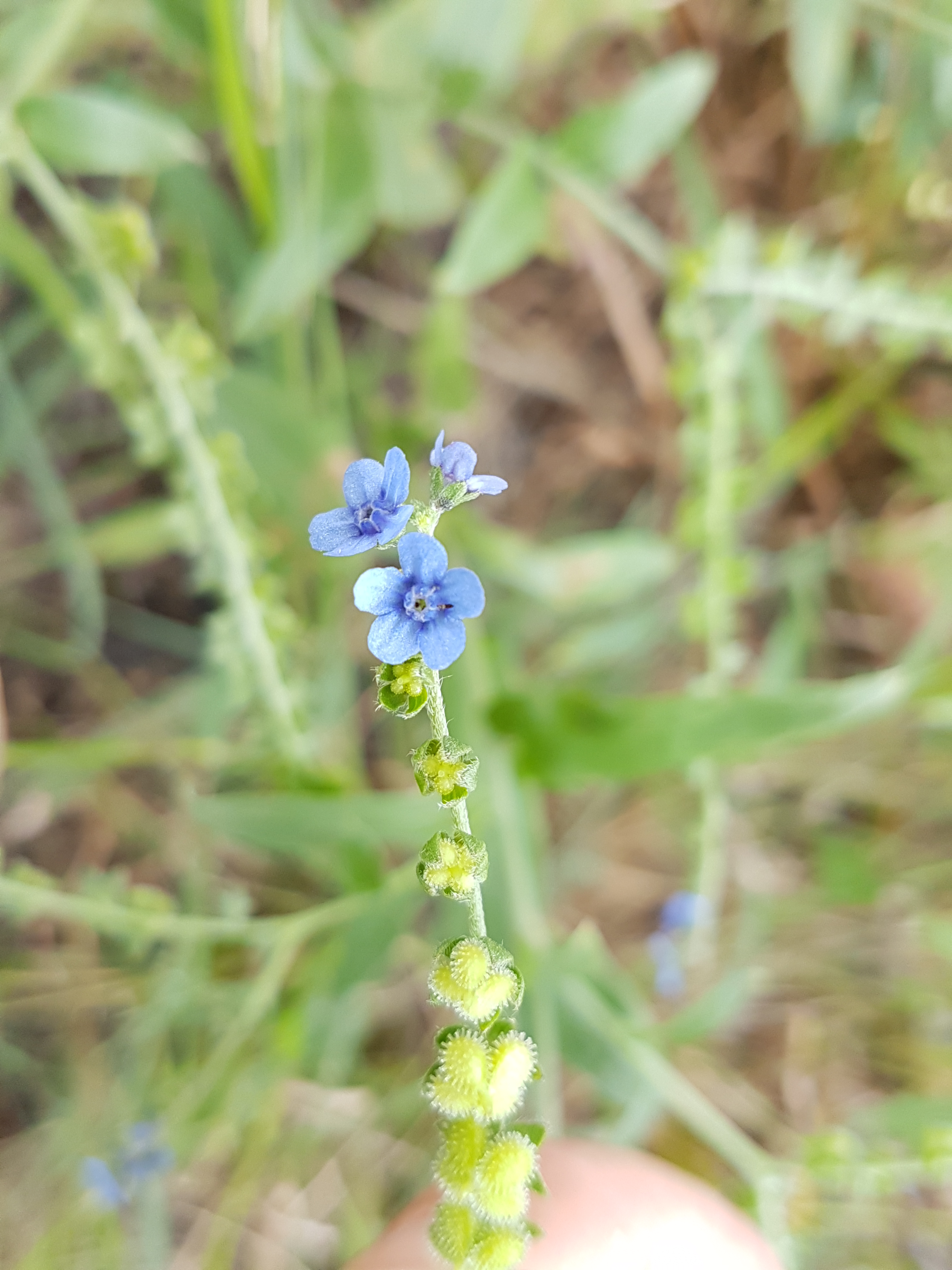

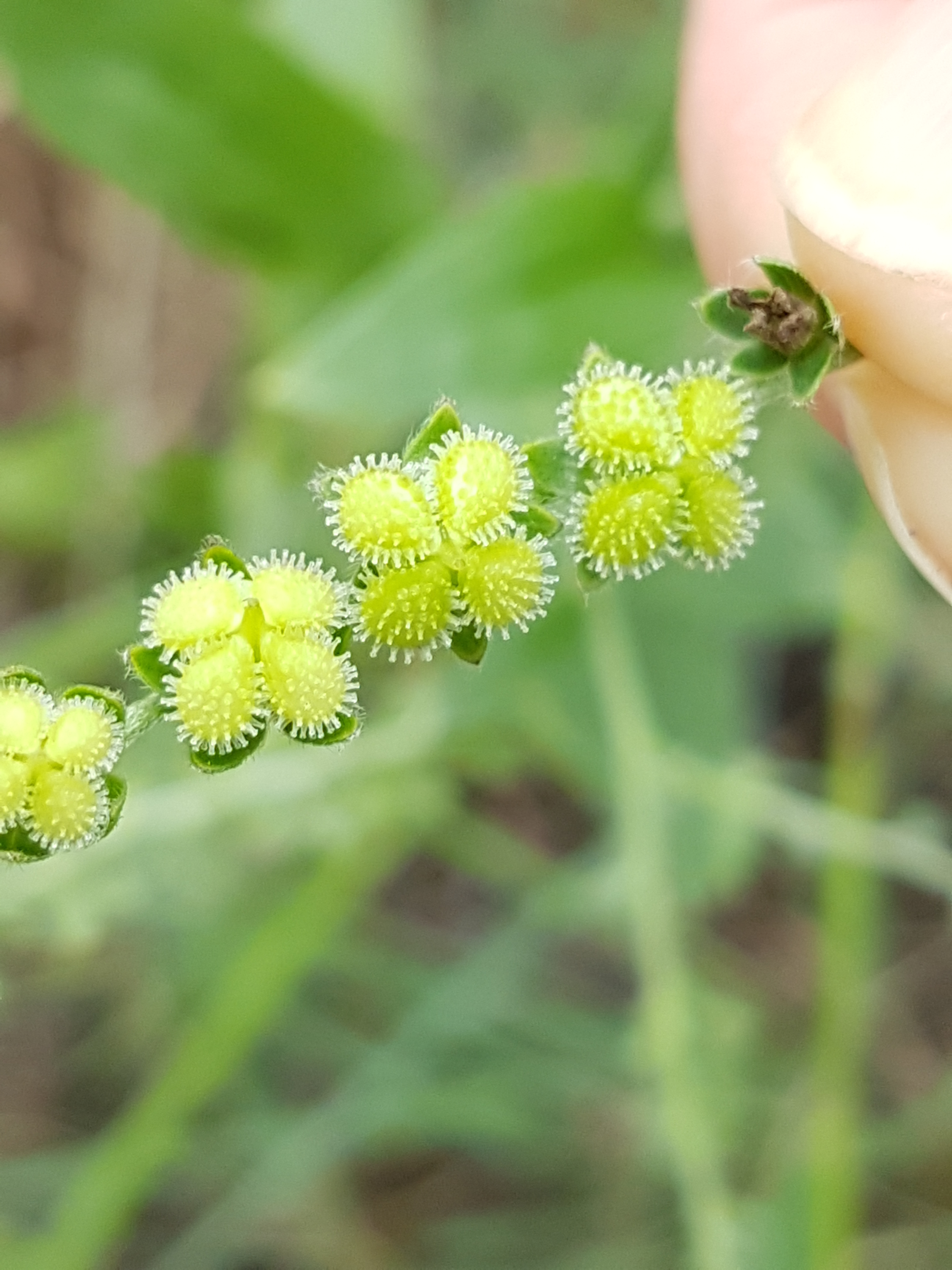

Scientific classification
- Kingdom: Plantae
- Clade: Tracheophytes
- Clade: Angiosperms
- Clade: Eudicots
- Clade: Asterids
- Order: Boraginales
- Family: Boraginaceae
- Genus: Cynoglossum
- Species: C. lanceolatum

Binomial name
- Cynoglossum lanceolatum Forssk.

Synonyms
- Cynoglossum lanceolatum f. albiflorum (Masam.) Yonek.; Cynoglossum lanceolatum subsp. geometricum (Baker & C.H.Wright) Brand; Cynoglossum lanceolatum var. mannii (Baker & C.H.Wright) Brand

= Cynoglossum lanceolatum =

Species of flowering plant

Cynoglossum lanceolatum Forssk. is closely related to and grades into Cynoglossum coeruleum Hochst. ex A.DC. It is a much-branched biennial plant, occurring widely with an anthropogenic distribution, harvested from the wild and used as both food and medicine. This species was first described by the Swede Peter Forsskål in 1775 in Flora Aegyptiaco-Arabica 41.

Parts of the plant are used as a diaphoretic, a colic medicine for children, a diuretic expectorant, and as a febrifuge and vermifuge. A poultice made from crushed plant parts is applied to wounds by the Basuto, while the roots are used in the treatment of eye ailments. The plant is used in soup. Tests for bitters, alkaloid, volatile oil, hydrocyanic acid, saponin and triterpenoids have proven negative.

== Distribution ==
From Côte d'Ivoire to Ethiopia, south to South Africa, Madagascar, the Arabian Peninsula, Pakistan, India, Sri Lanka, Myanmar, Nepal, eastward to China and Malaysia. Found from sea-level to 2500 meters.

== Gallery ==
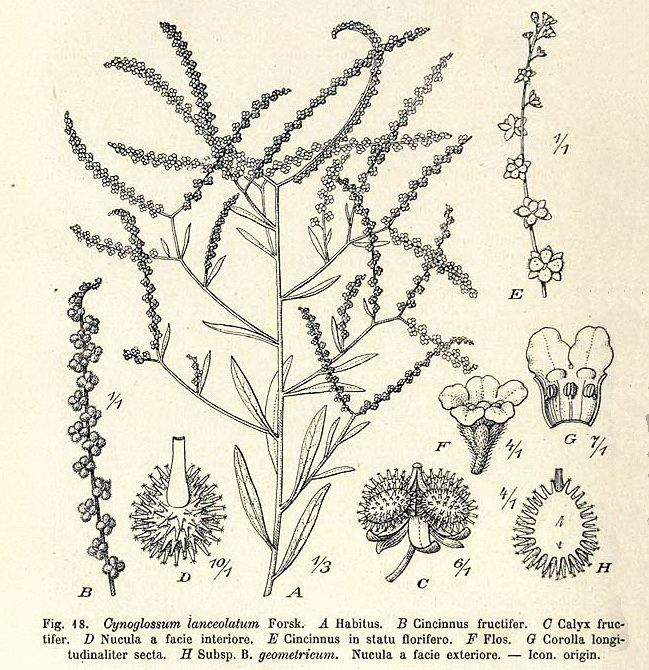
Plate from Engler, H.G.A., Das Pflanzenreich

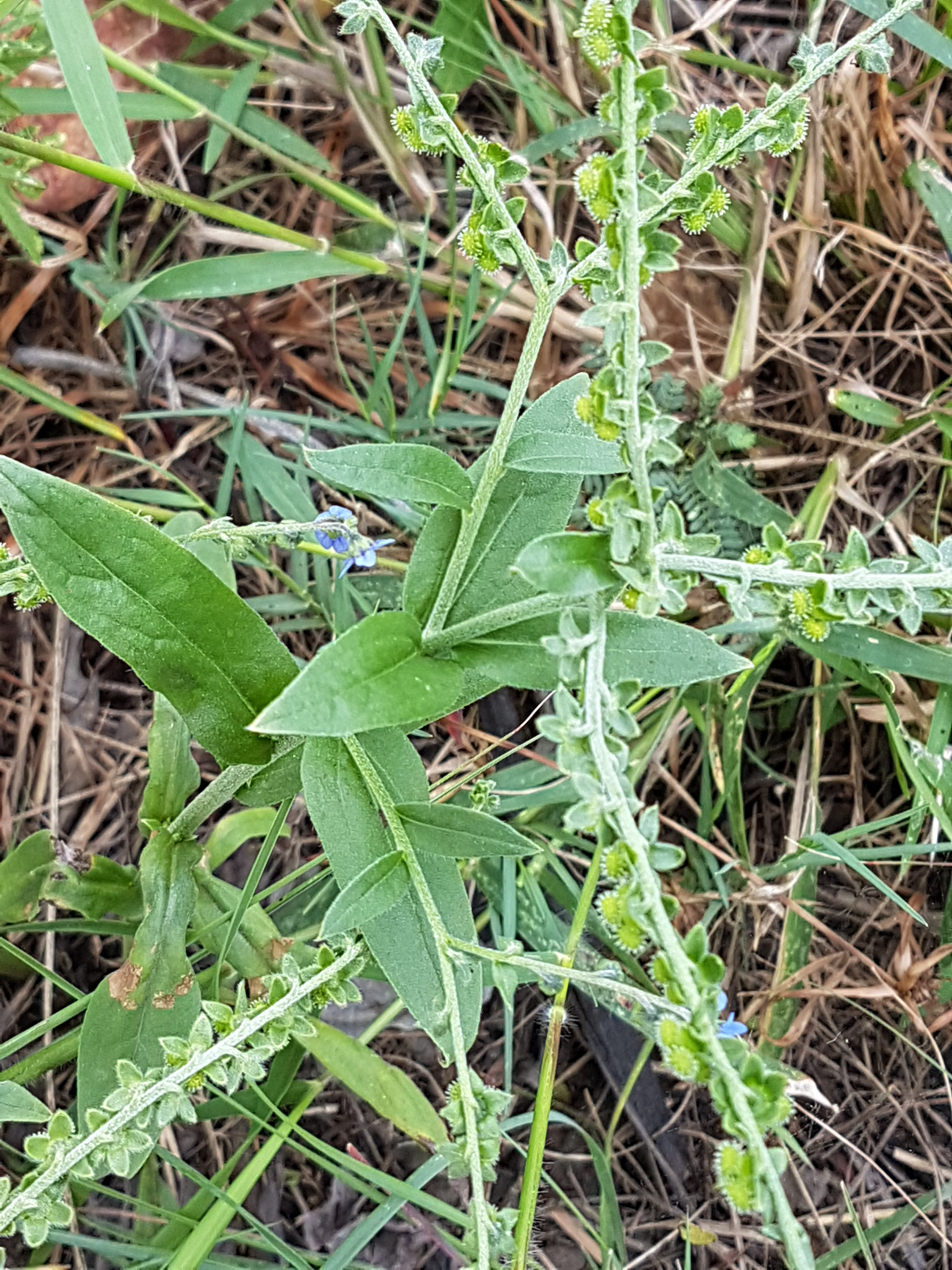

.
