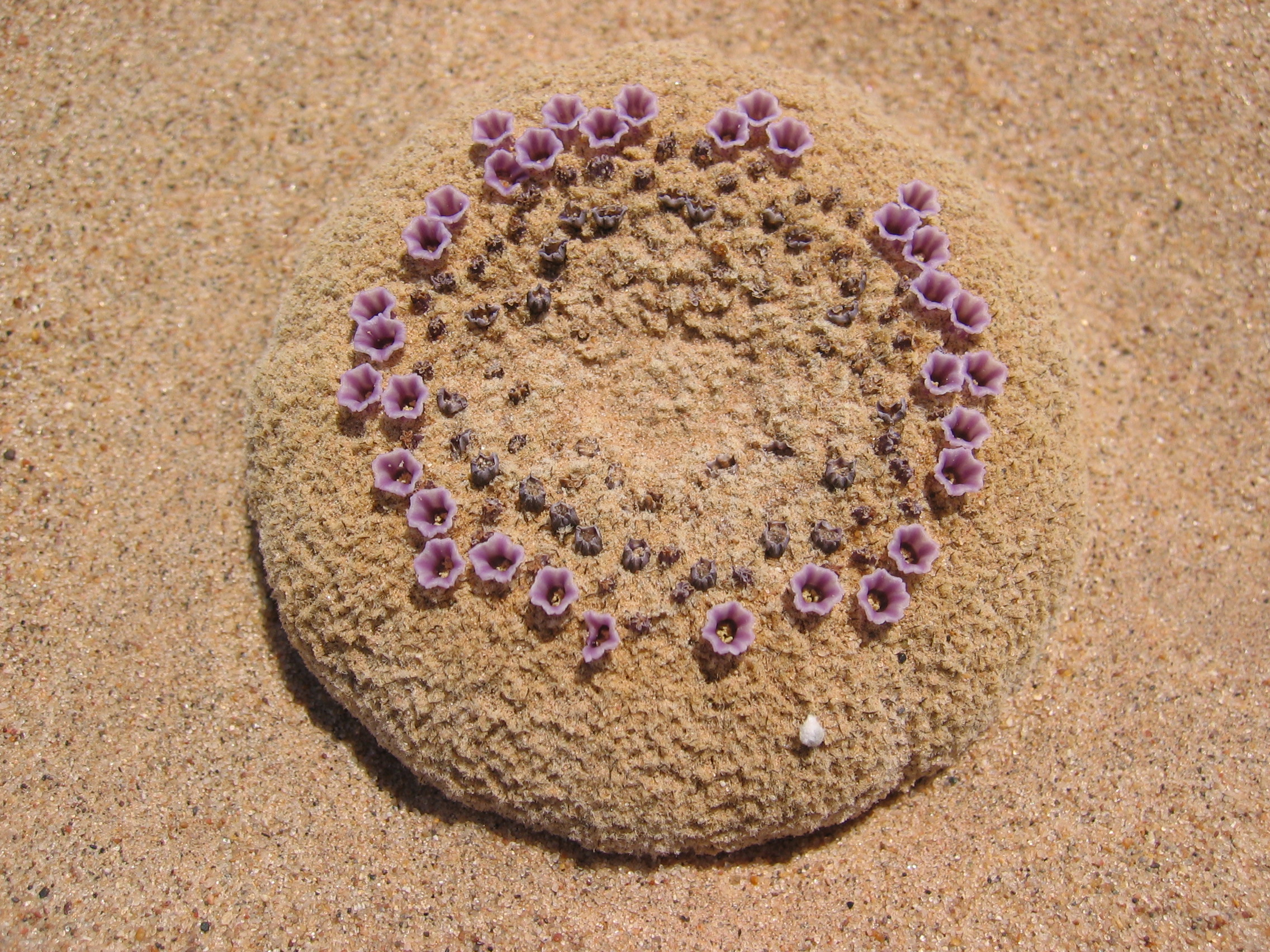

Conservation status
- Imperiled (NatureServe)

Scientific classification
- Kingdom: Plantae
- Clade: Tracheophytes
- Clade: Angiosperms
- Clade: Eudicots
- Clade: Asterids
- Order: Boraginales
- Family: Lennoaceae
- Genus: Pholisma
- Species: P. sonorae

Binomial name
- Pholisma sonorae (Torr. ex Gray) Yatskievych

= Pholisma sonorae =

Species of flowering plant

Pholisma sonorae, commonly known as sandfood, is a rare and unusual species of flowering plant endemic to the Sonoran Deserts to the west of Yuma, Arizona in the California Yuha, Mojave Desert and Colorado Desert, and south in the Yuma Desert, where it is known from only a few locations.

== Description ==
Pholisma sonorae is a perennial herb which grows in sand dunes, its fleshy stem extending down to two meters (six feet) below the surface and emerging above as a small rounded or ovate form. It may be somewhat mushroom-shaped if enough sand blows away to reveal the top of the stem. It is a parasitic plant which attaches to the roots of various desert shrubs such as wild buckwheats, ragweeds, plucheas, and Tiquilia plicata and T. palmeri to obtain nutrients.

As a heterotroph, the Pholisma sonorae plant lacks chlorophyll and is grayish, whitish, or brown in color. It has glandular scale-like leaves along its surface. It is speculated that the plant obtains water, not from its host plants, but through stomata in its leaves. The plant blooms in centimeter-wide flowers which are pink to purple in color with white margins.

== Uses ==
This was an important food item for certain desert-dwelling Native American peoples, including the Cocopah and the Hia C-eḍ O'odham.

== Status ==
The plant is rare and threatened by off-road vehicle use in much of its habitat of sandy dunes. Other threats include military activities, development, agriculture, habitat loss, and non-native plants. Pholisma sonorae is ranked 1B.2 on the California Native Plant Society's Rare Plant Inventory, meaning it is rare, threatened, or endangered in California and elsewhere.
