= Menisdaurin =

Identifiers
CAS Number	67765-58-6
3D model (JSmol)	Interactive image
ChemSpider	4944667
ECHA InfoCard	100.378.619
EC Number	894-607-5
PubChem CID	6440400
CompTox Dashboard (EPA)	DTXSID301349628
- InChI: InChI=1S/C14H19NO7/c15-4-3-7-1-2-8(17)5-9(7)21-14-13(20)12(19)11(18)10(6-16)22-14/h1-3,8-14,16-20H,5-6H2/b7-3-/t8-,9-,10-,11-,12+,13-,14-/m1/s1 Key: UTHVFIKQCUKKQW-YIVVZXMPSA-N
- SMILES: C1[C@@H](C=C/C(=C/C#N)/[C@@H]1O[C@H]2[C@@H]([C@H]([C@@H]([C@H](O2)CO)O)O)O)O

Properties
Chemical formula	C_{14}H_{19}NO_{7}
Molar mass	313.3 g·mol^{−1}
- Except where otherwise noted, data are given for materials in their standard state (at 25 °C [77 °F], 100 kPa). Infobox references

Menisdaurin is a glycoside and nitrile originally isolated from Menispermum dauricum, but is also found in European holly and other plants.

== Occurrence ==
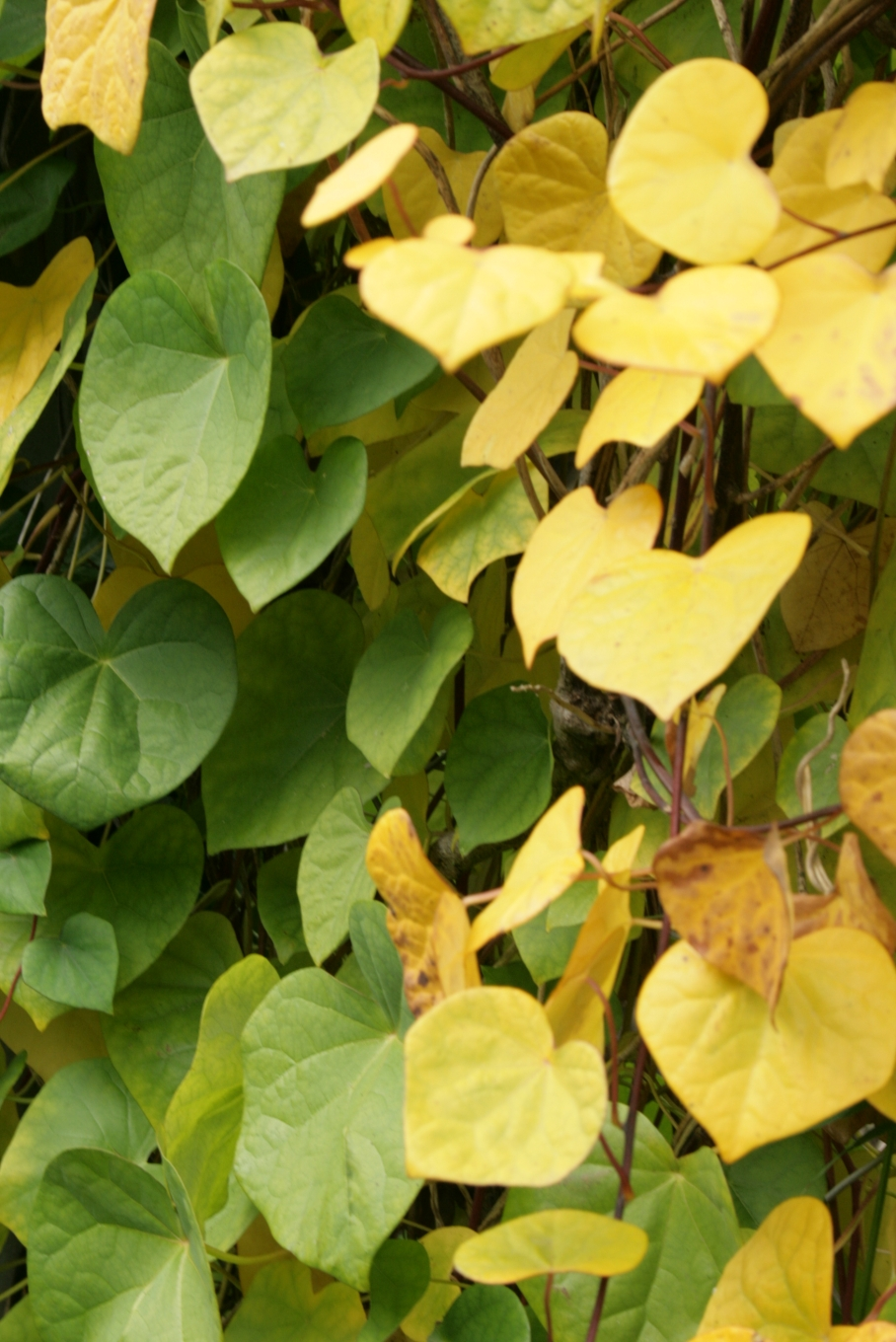
Dahurian moonseed

Menisdaurin was first isolated in the 1970s from Menispermum dauricum (genus Menispermum). The compound was named after the plant. It is also present in Flueggea virosa (genus Flueggea), in European holly, and in various species of the genus Tiquilia (family Tiquilia), especially in large quantities in Tiquilia canescens.

== Properties ==
The compound is a glucoside and contains an α,β-unsaturated nitrile in the aglycone. The sugar component is glucose. It forms colorless crystalline platelets with a melting point of 175-176 °C. The compound can be hydrolyzed with β-glucosidase or with 20% sulfuric acid, during which the aglycone decomposes following glucose elimination. However, under suitable conditions, the aglycone can be isolated. For this purpose, the glycoside is reacted in an aqueous sodium acetate buffer with glucosidase, and the released aglycone, which is unstable in water, is continuously extracted with ethyl acetate.
