= Rochefortia cuneata =

Conservation status
- Vulnerable (IUCN 2.3)

Scientific classification
- Kingdom: Plantae
- Clade: Tracheophytes
- Clade: Angiosperms
- Clade: Eudicots
- Clade: Asterids
- Order: Boraginales
- Family: Ehretiaceae
- Genus: Rochefortia
- Species: R. cuneata

Binomial name
- Rochefortia cuneata Sw. (1788)

Synonyms
- Rochefortia acrantha Urb. (1908); Rochefortia bahamensis Britton (1907); Rochefortia cuneata subsp. bahamensis (Britton) G.Klotz (1982); Rochefortia ovata Sw. (1788)

Species of plant

Rochefortia cuneata is a species of plant in the family Ehretiaceae. It is shrub native to the Bahamas, Cuba, Hispaniola, and Jamaica.
