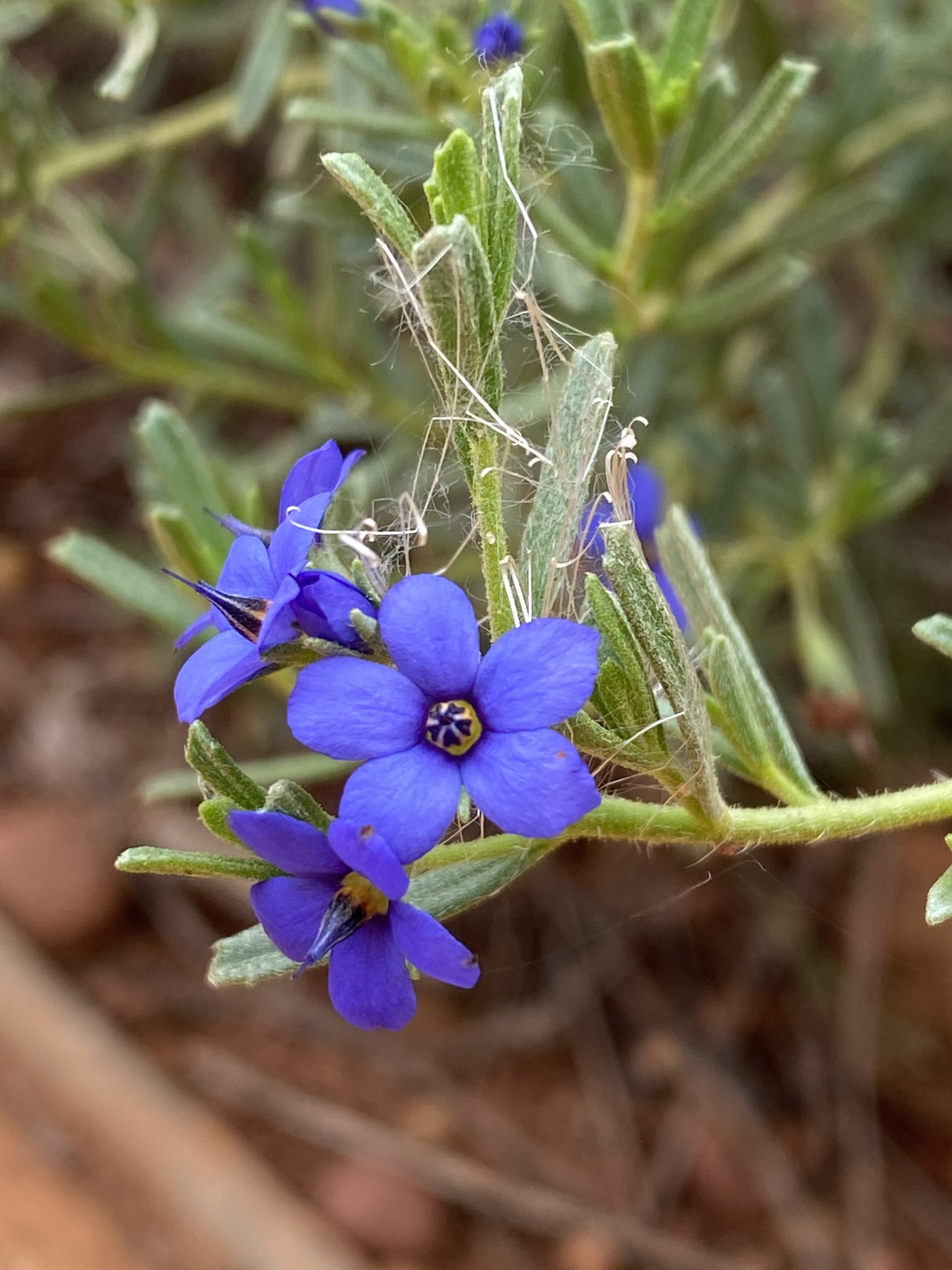

Scientific classification
- Kingdom: Plantae
- Clade: Tracheophytes
- Clade: Angiosperms
- Clade: Eudicots
- Clade: Asterids
- Order: Boraginales
- Family: Ehretiaceae
- Genus: Halgania
- Species: H. cyanea

Binomial name
- Halgania cyanea Lindl.

= Halgania cyanea =

Rough halgania

Species of plant

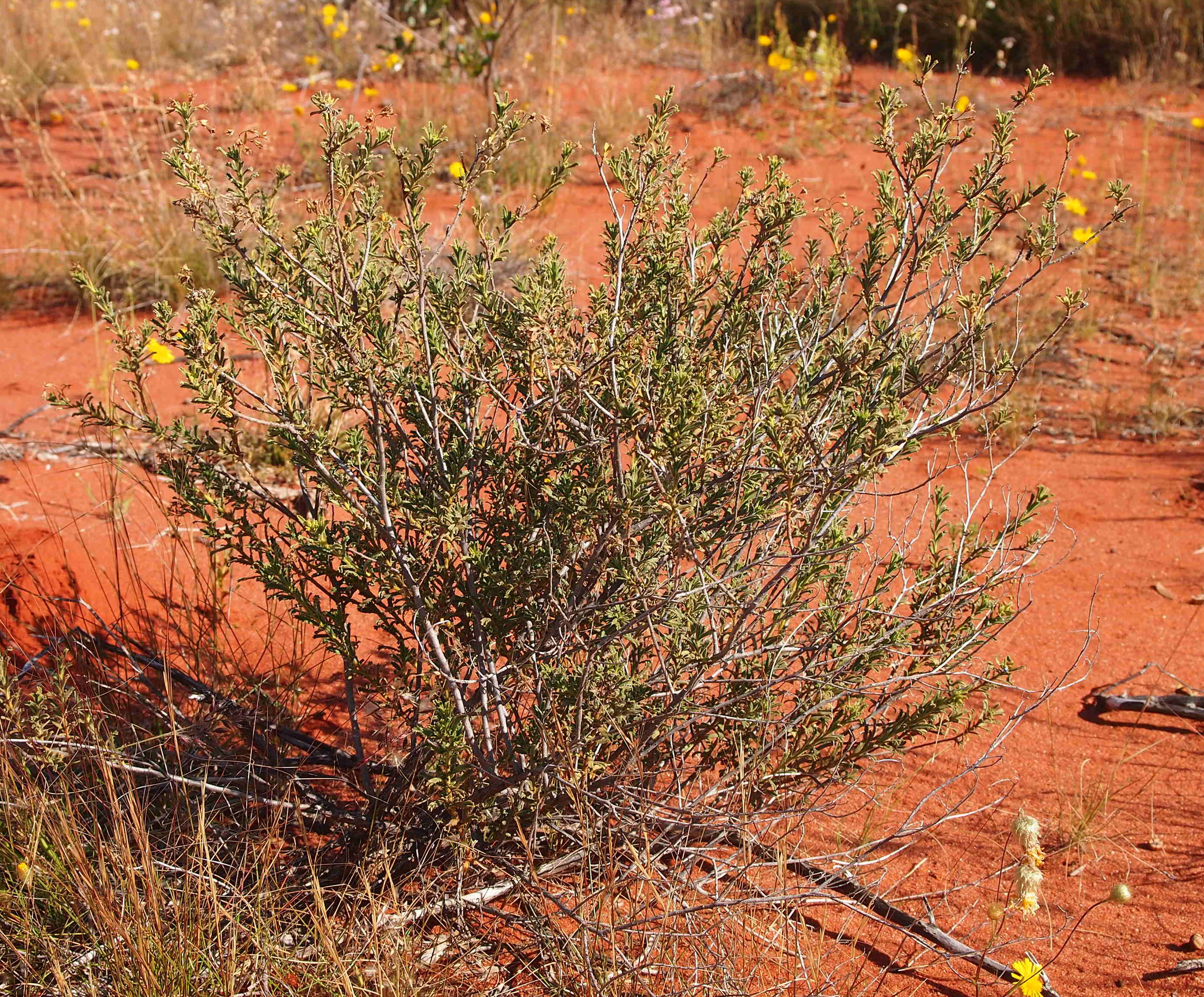
Halgania cyanea "Allambi-Station"

Halgania cyanea, commonly known as rough halgania, is a species of flowering plant in the family Ehretiaceae. It is a small perennial shrub with dull green leaves, bright blue flowers and is endemic to Australia.

== Description ==
Halgania cyanea is a small, usually dense perennial, growing up to 20–40 cm (7.9–15.7 in) high and a spreading habit up to 2 m (6 ft 7 in) wide. The dull green leaves are narrow elliptic or linear shaped, 4–20 mm (0.16–0.79 in) long and 20–40 mm (0.79–1.57 in) wide, flattened, glandular hairs on the upper surface, toothed edges and almost sessile. The bright blue or rarely white flowers 10–12 mm (0.39–0.47 in) in diameter, usually singly or up to 3 in a cluster in a terminal inflorescence on a pedicel 2–10 mm (0.079–0.394 in) long, calyx 3–4 mm (0.12–0.16 in) long, lobes narrow-triangular or lance-shaped, equal in size. It mostly flowers in summer or sporadically throughout the year. The fruit is a brown drupe containing one or two seed.

== Taxonomy and naming ==
Halgania cyanea was first formally described in 1840 by John Lindley and the description was published in A Sketch of the Vegetation of the Swan River Colony. The specific epithet (cyanea) means "dark blue".

== Distribution and habitat ==
Rough halgania occurs in a wide range of situations including sandy loam, sand plains, mallee and sand dunes in Western Australia, South Australia, Victoria and the Northern Territory, but is restricted to mallee communities in New South Wales.
