= Tiquilia galapagoa =

Conservation status
- Least Concern (IUCN 3.1)

Scientific classification
- Kingdom: Plantae
- Clade: Tracheophytes
- Clade: Angiosperms
- Clade: Eudicots
- Clade: Asterids
- Order: Boraginales
- Family: Ehretiaceae
- Genus: Tiquilia
- Species: T. galapagoa

Binomial name
- Tiquilia galapagoa (J.T.Howell) A.T.Richardson

Species of plant

Tiquilia galapagoa is a species of plant in the family Ehretiaceae. It is endemic to the Galápagos Islands.
