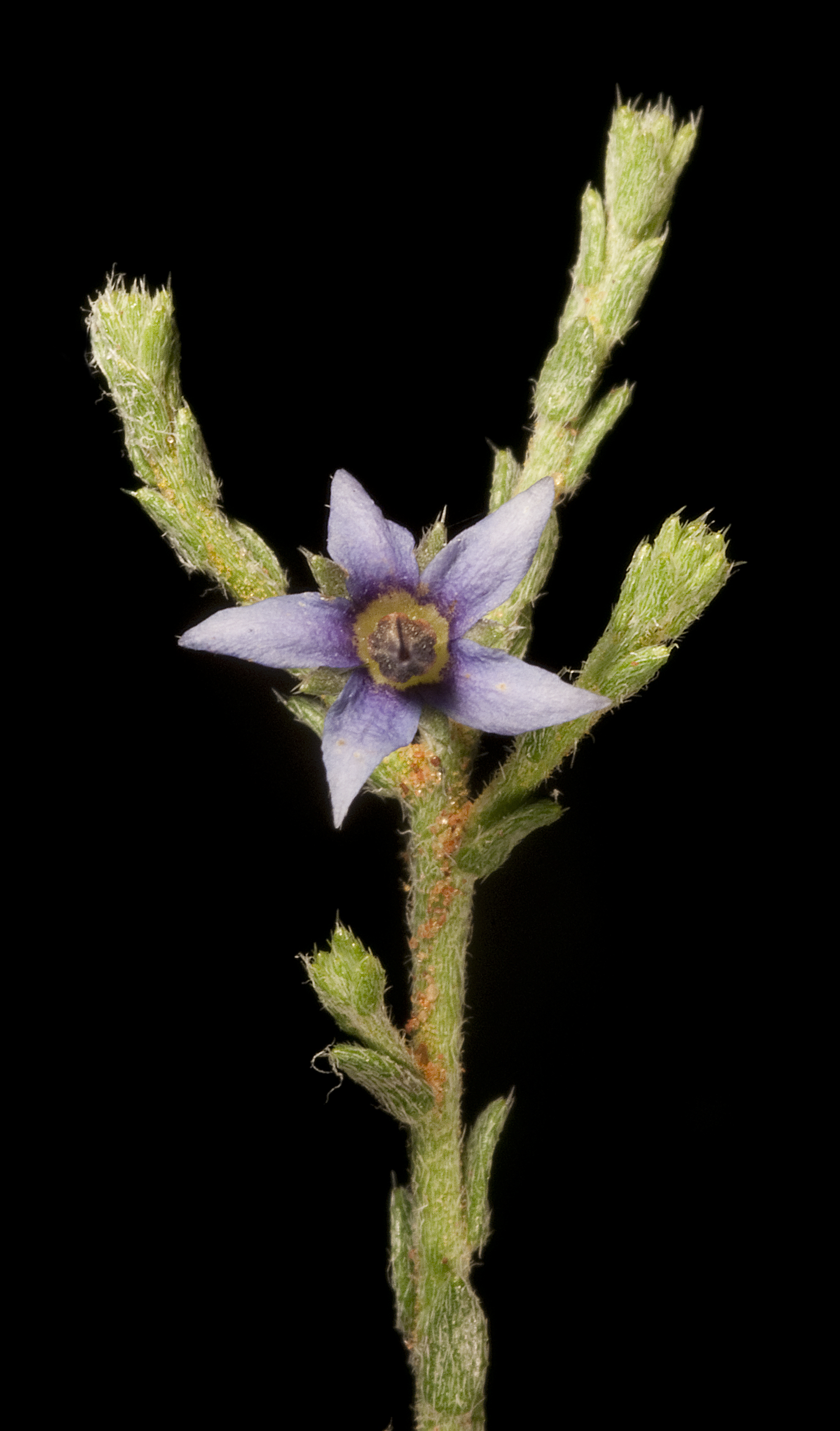

Scientific classification
- Kingdom: Plantae
- Clade: Tracheophytes
- Clade: Angiosperms
- Clade: Eudicots
- Clade: Asterids
- Order: Boraginales
- Family: Ehretiaceae
- Genus: Halgania
- Species: H. erecta

Binomial name
- Halgania erecta Ewart & B.Rees

= Halgania erecta =

Species of plant

Halgania erecta is a species of flowering plant in the family Ehretiaceae. It is a small, understory perennial shrub with blue flowers and grows in South Australia, Western Australia and the Northern Territory.
