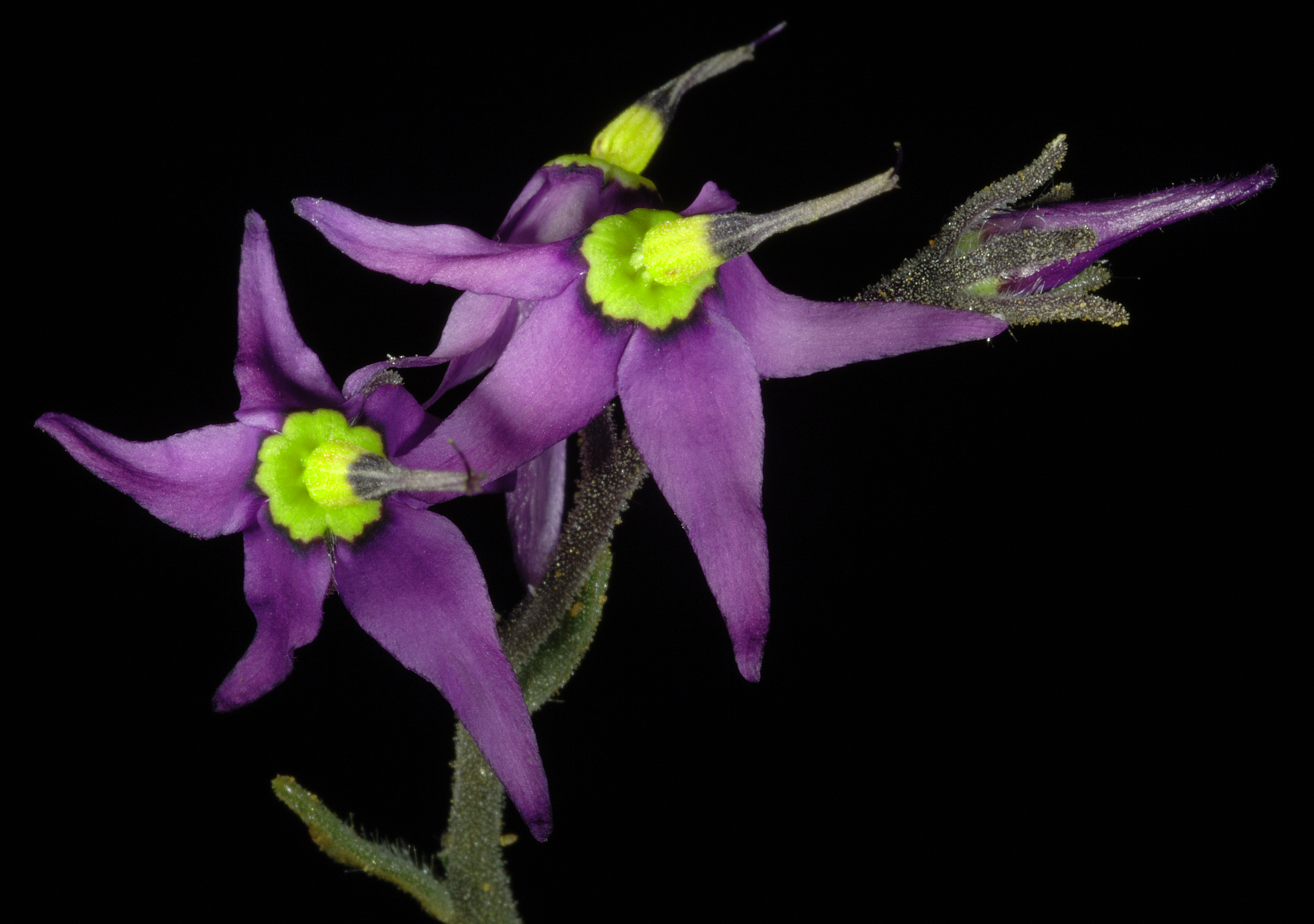

Scientific classification
- Kingdom: Plantae
- Clade: Tracheophytes
- Clade: Angiosperms
- Clade: Eudicots
- Clade: Asterids
- Order: Boraginales
- Family: Ehretiaceae
- Genus: Halgania
- Species: H. solanacea

Binomial name
- Halgania solanacea F.Muell.

= Halgania solanacea =

Species of plant

Halgania solanacea is a species of flowering plant in the family Ehretiaceae. It is a small, perennial herb or shrub with purple-blue flowers and grows to 0.15–1 m (5.9 in – 3 ft 3.4 in) high. It grows in sand, gravelly soils, rocky hillsides and dunes in Western Australia and the Northern Territory.

== Taxonomy and naming ==
This species was first formally described in 1857 by Ferdinand von Mueller and the description was published in Hooker's Journal of Botany and Kew Garden Miscellany.
