= Poisonberry =

List of plants with the same or similar names

Poisonberry is a common name of many species of plant:

- Actaea rubra, a herbaceous North American plant in buttercup family more often known as red baneberry
- Bourreria succulenta, a tree native to the Caribbean
- Cestrum ssp., warm temperate and tropical plants more often known as cestrums or jessamines
- Clintonia borealis, herbaceous plant native to North America more often known as bluebead
- Solanum dulcamara, a Eurasian plant more often known as bittersweet nightshade
