= Hia C-eḍ Oʼodham =

Native American people of the Sonoran Desert

Hia C-eḍ O'odham
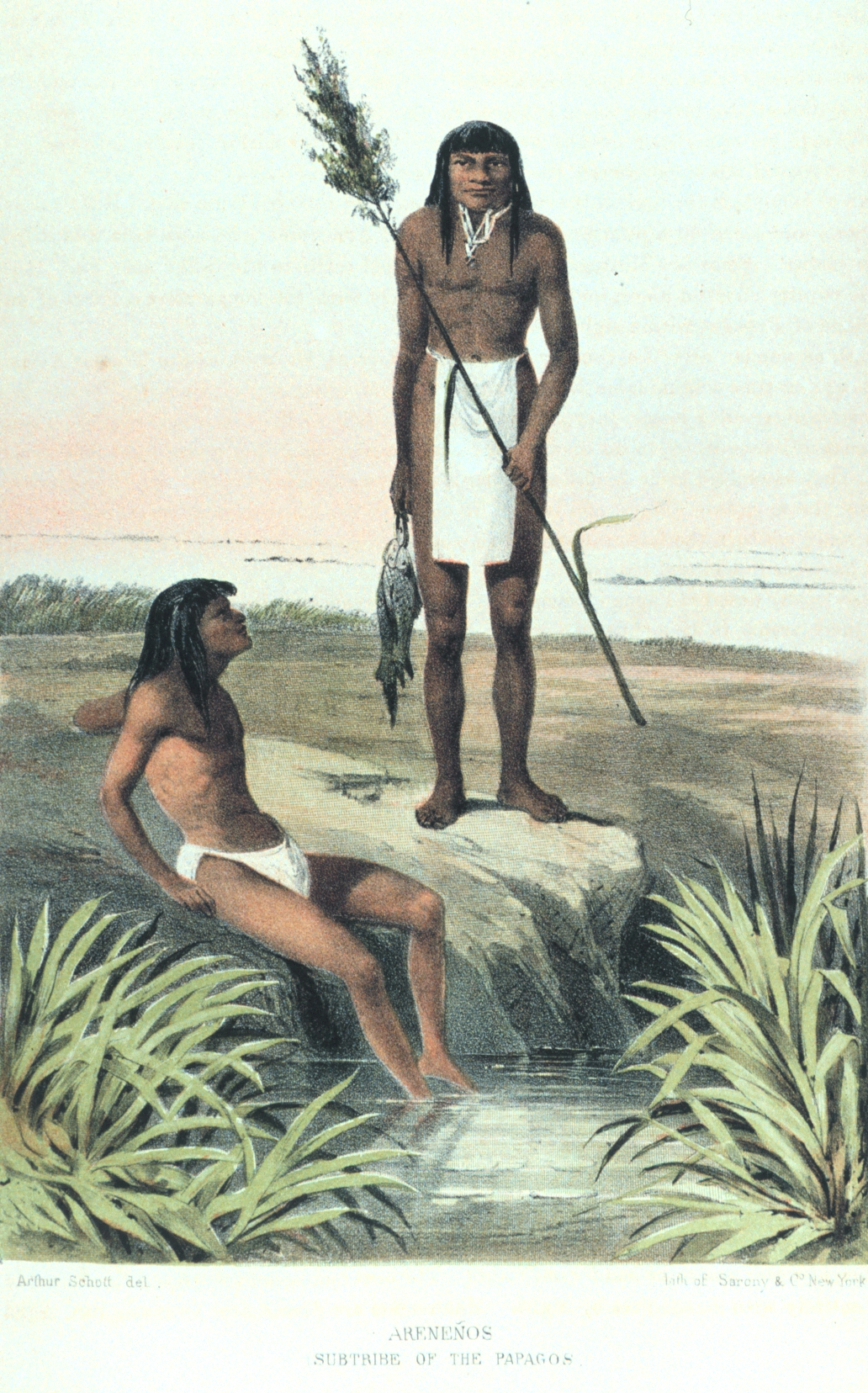
- Two Hia C-eḍ O'odham men after a successful fishing expedition. Lithograph from 1857

Total population
- Roughly 1,000

Regions with significant populations
- United States (Arizona)

Languages
- O'odham, English, Spanish

Religion
- Indigenous religion, Catholic, Protestant

Related ethnic groups
- Tohono O'odham, Akimel O'odham, Pima Bajo, Tepehuán

The Hia C-eḍ O'odham ("Sand Dune People"), also known as Areneños, are a Indigenous peoples of the Americas whose traditional homeland lies between the Ajo Range, the Gila River, the Colorado River, and the Gulf of California. They are unrecognized at both the state and federal level in the United States and Mexico, although the Tohono O'odham Nation has a committee for issues related to them and has land held in trust for them. They are represented by a community organization known as the Hia-Ced O'odham Alliance. The Hia C-eḍ O'odham are no longer nomadic, and the majority today live in or near Ajo, Arizona, or the small settlements of Blaisdell and Dome near Yuma.

== Tribal relations ==
They have often been considered an O'odham subtribe by anthropologists, along with the Tohono O'odham and several groups that vanished or merged with the Tohono O'odham. Anybody who can prove Hia C-eḍ O'odham ancestry meeting Tohono O'odham Nation Blood quantum laws can apply for membership in the Tohono O'odham Nation. Some Hia C-eḍ O'odham are enrolled in the Ak-Chin Indian Community.

Along with the Akimel O'odham and the Tohono O'odham, the Hia C-eḍ O'odham are members of the O'odham people.

== Recent history ==
On February 24, 2009, 642.27 acres of land near Why, Arizona, which were previously purchased by the Tohono O'odham Nation, were acquired in trust for the Nation. This was done with the intention of eventually creating a new district of the Tohono O'odham Nation for the Hia C-eḍ O'odham. On October 30, 2012, a new tribal law went into effect creating the "Hia Ced District" as a new 12th district of the Tohono O'odham nation, with the trust land near Why as its initial land base. For three years after the effective date, previously enrolled members of the Tohono O'odham Nation had the right to request that their district designation be reassigned to the new district. People applying for tribal enrollment could also request the Hia Ced District as their district designation. Following controversy over its management and expenditures, the new district was dissolved in accordance with an initiative approved by voters of the Tohono O'odham Nation on April 25, 2015. Property and funds of the Hia Ced District reverted to the Nation, and members' enrollment reverted to their previous district.

In December 2015, former leaders of the Hia Ced District announced the formation of an organization called Hia-Ced Hemajkam, LLC, whose goal would be to seek federal recognition of the Hia-Ced O'odham as a distinct Indian tribe.

== Culture ==
Due to geographical proximity, certain cultural traits were borrowed from the Yuman peoples, with some sources implying that their culture was more Yuman than it was Piman, with the exception of their language. According to historical sources, the Hia C-eḍ O'odham were friendly with the Cocopah, the Quechan, and the Halchidhoma.

=== Cuisine ===
The Hia C-eḍ O'odham were traditionally hunters and gatherers. They caught jackrabbits by chasing them down in the sand. They hunted mountain sheep, mule deer, and pronghorn with bows and arrows. They caught muskrats and lizards as well. During certain seasons, they went to the gulf to fish and obtain salt.

They also ate Pholisma sonorae, an edible flower stalk called camote and "sand food" found in the sand dunes, mesquite beans, saguaro fruit, and pitaya, which they gathered near Quitobaquito and the Lower Sonoita River.

== See also ==
- El Camino del Diablo
