= Tiquilia fusca =

Conservation status
- Least Concern (IUCN 3.1)

Scientific classification
- Kingdom: Plantae
- Clade: Tracheophytes
- Clade: Angiosperms
- Clade: Eudicots
- Clade: Asterids
- Order: Boraginales
- Family: Ehretiaceae
- Genus: Tiquilia
- Species: T. fusca

Binomial name
- Tiquilia fusca Hook.f.

Species of plant

Tiquilia fusca is a species of flowering plant in the family Ehretiaceae. It is endemic to the Galápagos Islands.
