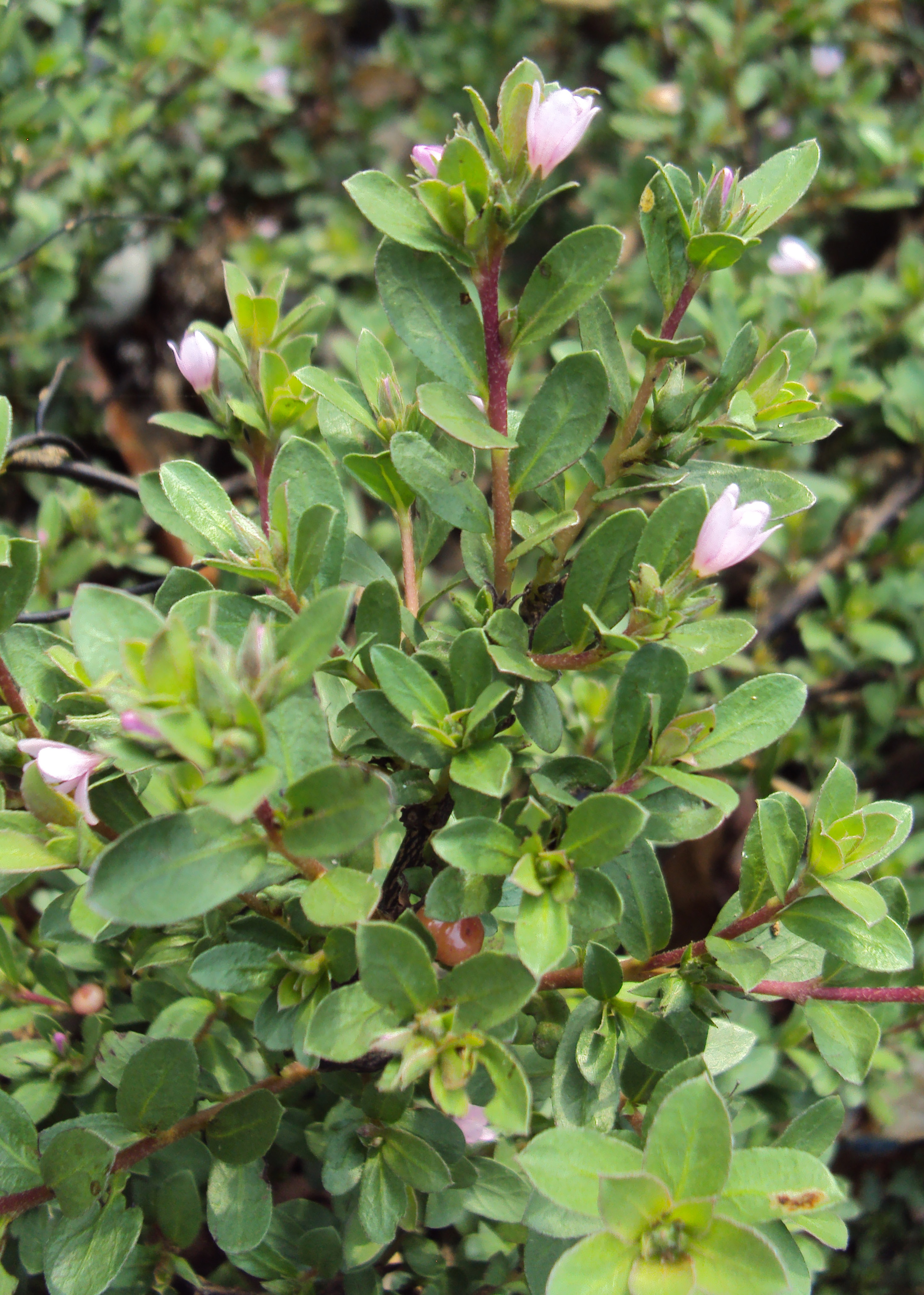
- Rotula aquatica leaves and flowers

Conservation status
- Least Concern (IUCN 3.1)

Scientific classification
- Kingdom: Plantae
- Clade: Embryophytes
- Clade: Tracheophytes
- Clade: Spermatophytes
- Clade: Angiosperms
- Clade: Eudicots
- Clade: Asterids
- Order: Boraginales
- Family: Ehretiaceae
- Genus: Rotula
- Species: R. aquatica

Binomial name
- Rotula aquatica Lour.

Synonyms
- List: Ehretia aquatica (Lour.) Gottschling & Hilger; Rhabdia aquatica (Lour.) Kuntze; Bourreria uniflora (Roxb.) G.Don; Carmona lycioides G.Don; Carmona viminea G.Don; Ehretia cuneata Wight; Ehretia lycioides (Mart.) Gottschling & Hilger; Ehretia lycioides (G.Don) Wall. ex B.D.Jacks.; Ehretia uniflora Roxb.; Ehretia viminea (G.Don) Wall. ex DC.; Rhabdia fluvialis Edgew.; Rhabdia lycioides Mart.; Rhabdia sericea Edgew.; Rhabdia viminea (G.Don) Dalzell ex Hook.; Rotula lycioides (Mart.) I.M.Johnst.; Zombiana africana Baill.

= Rotula aquatica =

Species of flowering plant in the borage family

Rotula aquatica is a species of aromatic flowering plant belonging to the family Ehretiaceae. It is a shrub native to tropical Asia, southern China, west tropical Africa, and eastern Brazil. It is a member of the lotic ecosystem of streams.

The plant is a mandatory component of many ayurvedic drug preparations and is an important traditional medicine for kidney and bladder stones. The root tuber is astringent, bitter, diuretic and also useful in treating coughs, heart diseases, dysuria, blood disorders, fever, poisonings, ulcers and uterine diseases. Root decoctions are both diuretic and laxative and are used to treat bladder stones and sexually transmitted diseases. Plants were exploited for their medicinal properties by excavating the roots, causing them to die. A study has shown that a protocol consisting of ex vitro rooting, commercial sugar, and tap water, can be economically advantageous.
