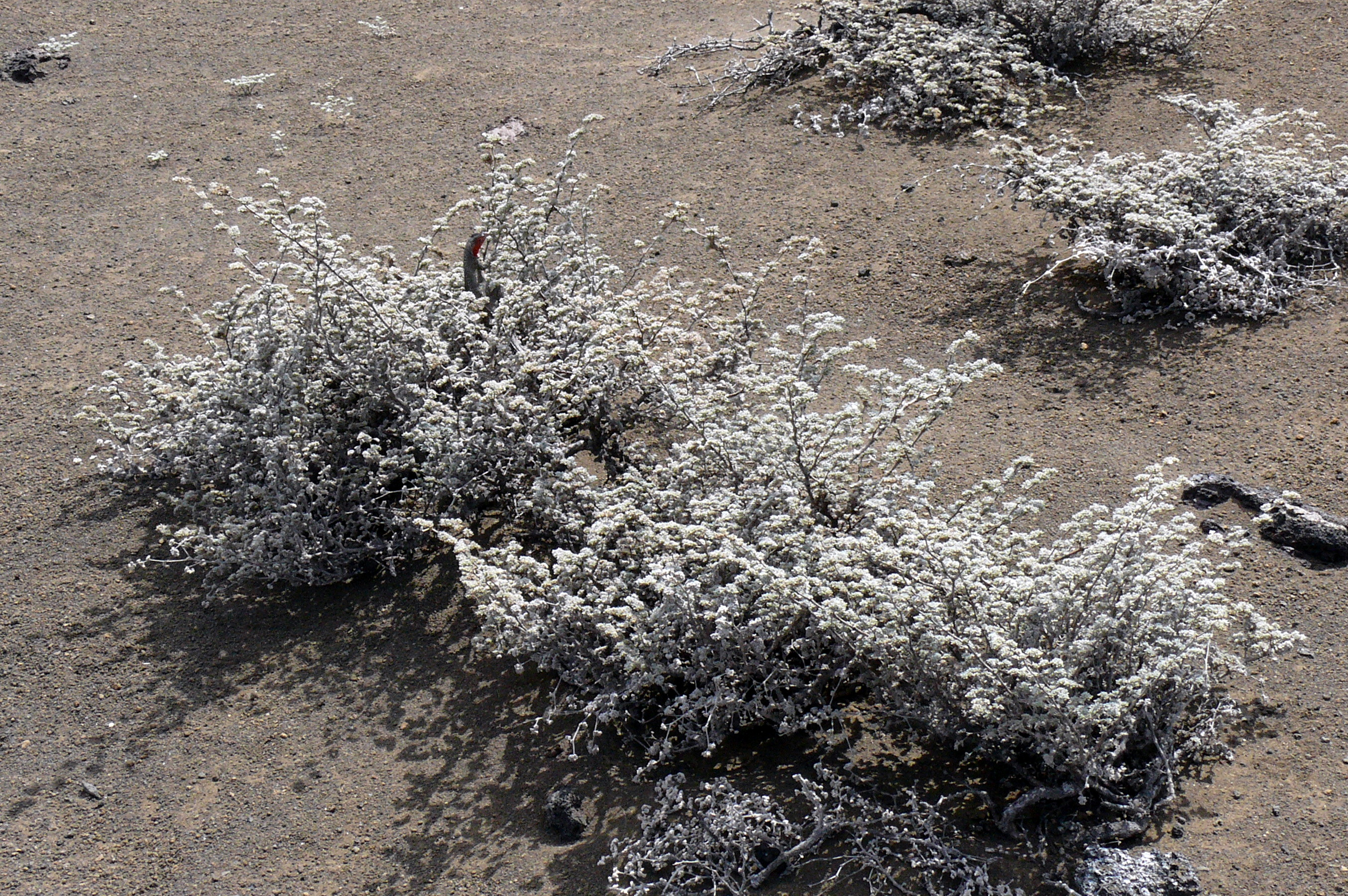

Conservation status
- Vulnerable (IUCN 2.3)

Scientific classification
- Kingdom: Plantae
- Clade: Tracheophytes
- Clade: Angiosperms
- Clade: Eudicots
- Clade: Asterids
- Order: Boraginales
- Family: Ehretiaceae
- Genus: Tiquilia
- Species: T. nesiotica

Binomial name
- Tiquilia nesiotica (J.T.Howell) A.T.Richardson

= Tiquilia nesiotica =

Species of plant

Tiquilia nesiotica, known as gray matplant, is a species of plant in the family Ehretiaceae. It is endemic to the Galápagos Islands.

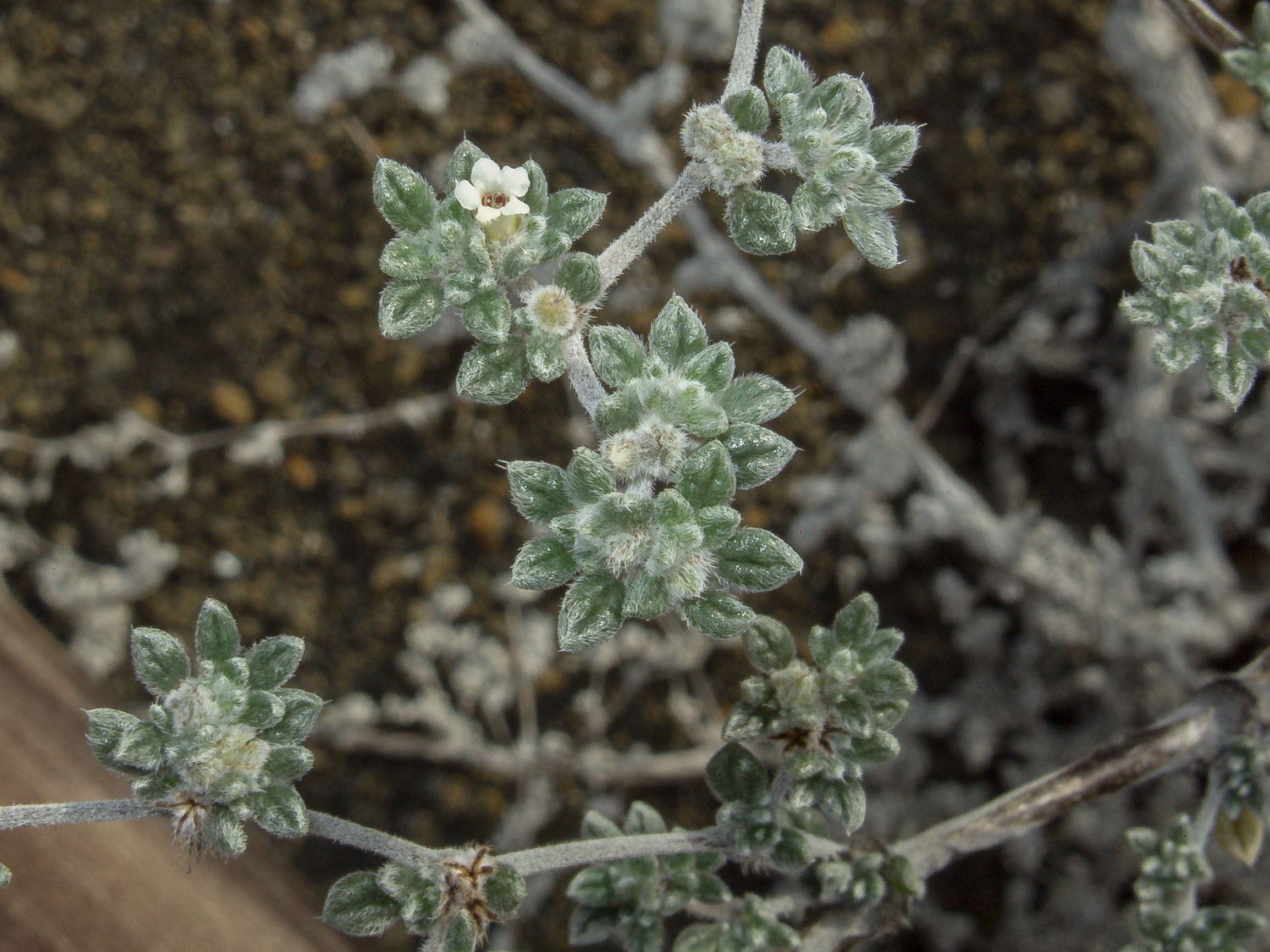
Flower
