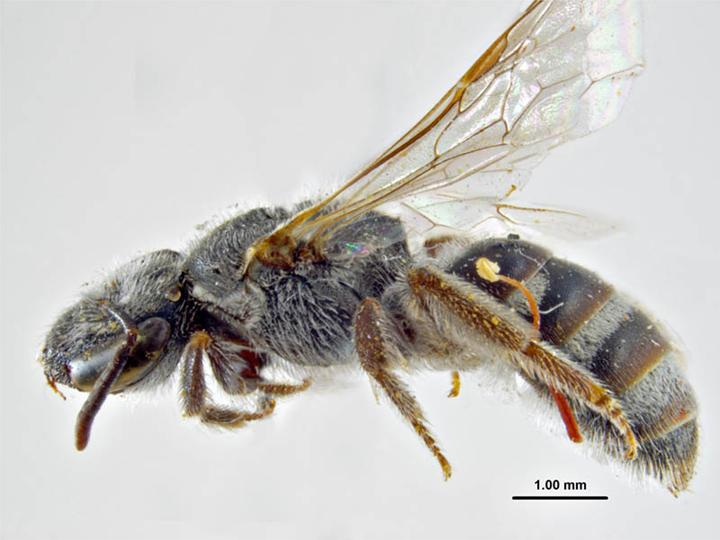
- Female
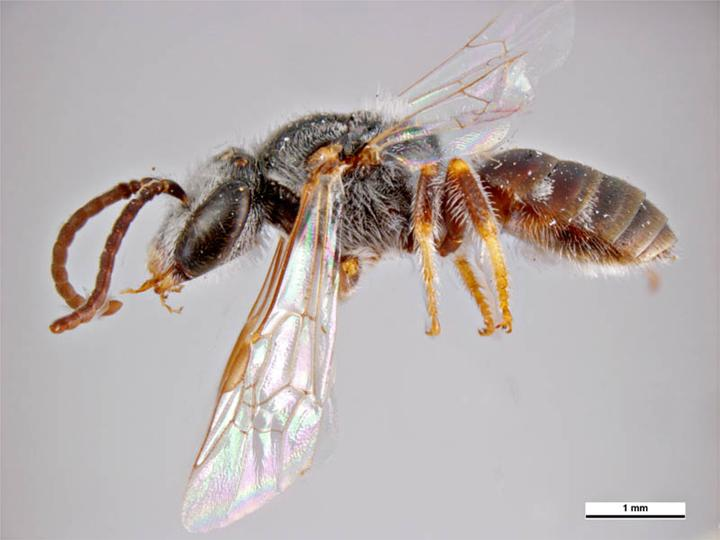
- Male

Scientific classification
- Kingdom: Animalia
- Phylum: Arthropoda
- Clade: Pancrustacea
- Class: Insecta
- Order: Hymenoptera
- Family: Halictidae
- Genus: Lasioglossum
- Species: L. chapmani

Binomial name
- Lasioglossum chapmani (Cockerell, 1910)

Synonyms
- Halictus chapmani Cockerell, 1910

= Lasioglossum chapmani =

Species of bee

Lasioglossum chapmani, or Lasioglossum (Chilalictus) chapmani, is a species of bee in the family Halictidae and subfamily Halictinae. It is endemic to Australia. It was described by British-American entomologist Theodore Dru Alison Cockerell in 1910.

== Description ==
Female body length is about 7 mm. Integumental colouration is mainly black, with dark reddish markings. The hair is white.

== Distribution and habitat ==
The species occurs across much of central and southern mainland Australia.

== Behaviour ==
The adults are flying mellivores. Flowering plants visited by the bees include Acacia, Alphitonia, Amyema, Angophora, Astartea, Atalaya, Brassica, Bursaria, Calandrinia, Cassia, Dicrastylis, Eremophila, Erigeron, Eucalyptus, Exocarpos, Frankenia, Grevillea, Halgania, Helichrysum, Hibiscus, Jacksonia, Seringia, Leptospermum, Leucopogon, Malus, Melaleuca, Mesembryanthemum, Nuytsia, Parkinsonia, Pultenaea, Senecio, Tamarix, Thryptomene, Trachymene and Wahlenbergia species.
