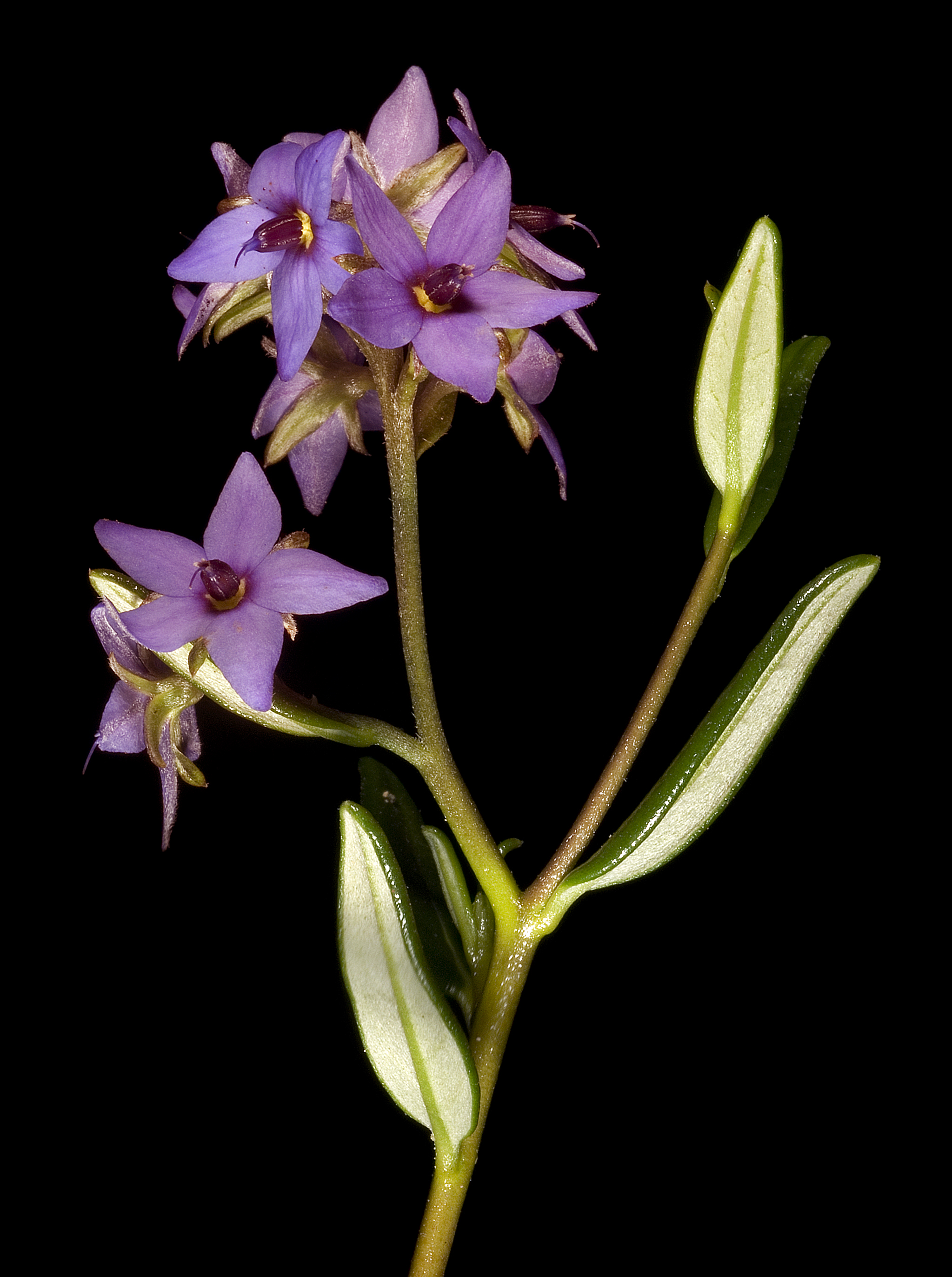

Scientific classification
- Kingdom: Plantae
- Clade: Tracheophytes
- Clade: Angiosperms
- Clade: Eudicots
- Clade: Asterids
- Order: Boraginales
- Family: Ehretiaceae
- Genus: Halgania
- Species: H. andromedifolia

Binomial name
- Halgania andromedifolia Behr & F.Muell.

= Halgania andromedifolia =

Species of plant

Halgania andromedifolia commonly known as lavender halgania, is a species of flowering plant in the family Ehretiaceae. It is a small, upright or spreading perennial shrub with blue flowers and grows in New South Wales, South Australia, Western Australia and Victoria.

== Description ==
Halgania andromedifolia is an upright, hairy, sparsely branched shrub to 1.3 m (4 ft 3 in) high. The leaves are oblong to narrowly elliptic, 10–25 mm (0.39–0.98 in) long, 2–6 mm (0.079–0.236 in) wide, margins rolled under, upper surface sticky, lower surface whitish, apex blunt and the petiole up to 2 mm (0.079 in) long. The blue flowers are borne at the end of stems in small clusters 10–15 mm (0.39–0.59 in) in diameter, corolla 5–8 mm (0.20–0.31 in) long, petals lance-shaped and hairy on the outside. Flowering occurs from August to November and the fruit is a drupe containing one seed.

== Taxonomy ==
Halgania andromedifolia was first formally described in 1859 by Hans Hermann Behr and Ferdinand von Mueller and the description was published in Fragmenta Phytographiae Australiae.

== Distribution and habitat ==
Lavender halgania grows in loam, clay and gravel in New South Wales, South Australia, Western Australia and Victoria.
