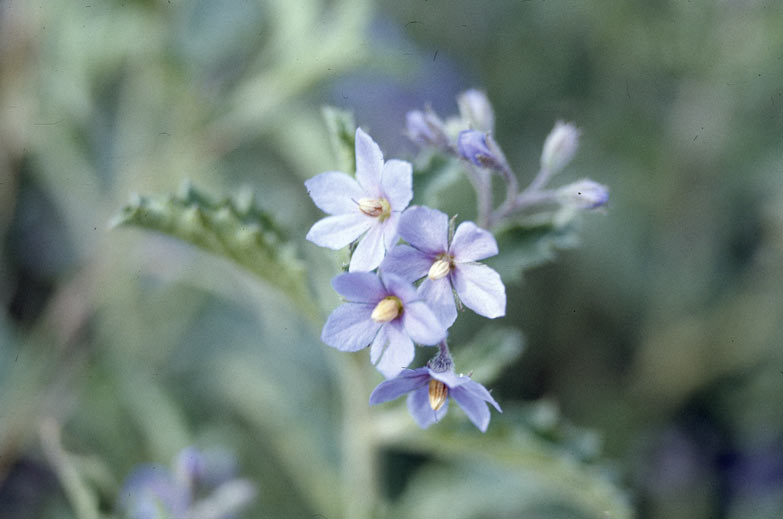

Scientific classification
- Kingdom: Plantae
- Clade: Tracheophytes
- Clade: Angiosperms
- Clade: Eudicots
- Clade: Asterids
- Order: Boraginales
- Family: Ehretiaceae
- Genus: Halgania
- Species: H. brachyrhyncha

Binomial name
- Halgania brachyrhyncha Peter G.Wilson

= Halgania brachyrhyncha =

Species of plant

Halgania brachyrhyncha is a species of flowering plant in the family Ehretiaceae. It is a small perennial shrub with blue flowers and grows in New South Wales and Queensland.

== Description ==
Halgania brachyrhyncha is a small, low, understory shrub 0.3–0.6 m (1 ft 0 in – 2 ft 0 in) high with conspicuous hairs. The leaves are elliptic to oblanceolate, tapering toward the stem, 1.5–4.5 cm (0.59–1.77 in) long 5–20 mm (0.20–0.79 in) wide, margins toothed and apex gradually tapering to a point. The blue flowers are borne at the end of the stems in loose clusters, 8–10 mm (0.31–0.39 in) in diameter on a pedicel 4–10 mm (0.16–0.39 in) long, corolla lobes 5–6 mm (0.20–0.24 in) long, sepals 3–4 mm (0.12–0.16 in) long, fused at the base and anthers 1.8–2.3 mm (0.071–0.091 in) long. Flowering occurs from October to January and fruit is a fleshy drupe containing one or two seeds.

== Taxonomy and naming ==
Halgania brachyrhyncha was first formally described in 1990 by Peter G. Wilson and the description was published in the journal Telopea. The specific epithet (brachyrhyncha) means "short beak" a reference to the anthers.

== Distribution and habitat ==
This species grows on infertile soils on ridges, hillsides in a variety of vegetation types north of Nowra and southern Queensland.
