= Tiquilia darwinii =

Conservation status
- Least Concern (IUCN 3.1)

Scientific classification
- Kingdom: Plantae
- Clade: Tracheophytes
- Clade: Angiosperms
- Clade: Eudicots
- Clade: Asterids
- Order: Boraginales
- Family: Ehretiaceae
- Genus: Tiquilia
- Species: T. darwinii

Binomial name
- Tiquilia darwinii (Hook.f.) A.T. Richardson

Species of plant

Tiquilia darwinii is a species of plant in the family Ehretiaceae. It is endemic to the Galápagos Islands of Ecuador.
