= Tiquilia palmeri =

Conservation status
- Apparently Secure (NatureServe)

Scientific classification
- Kingdom: Plantae
- Clade: Tracheophytes
- Clade: Angiosperms
- Clade: Eudicots
- Clade: Asterids
- Order: Boraginales
- Family: Ehretiaceae
- Genus: Tiquilia
- Species: T. palmeri

Binomial name
- Tiquilia palmeri (A.Gray) A.T.Richardson

Synonyms
- Coldenia palmeri

Species of plant

Tiquilia palmeri is a species of flowering plant in the borage family known by the common names Palmer's crinklemat and Palmer's tiquilia.

It is native to the southwestern United States and northern Mexico, where it grows in sandy desert areas.

== Description ==
Tiquilia palmeri is a woody perennial herb producing a white-barked, shaggy-haired stem. The clustered leaves have small, hairy, wrinkled blades rarely more than a centimeter long which are borne on longer petioles.

The inflorescence is a cluster of flowers borne in the leaf axils. Each flower has a bell-shaped purple, lavender, or bluish corolla up to a centimeter long with a short, tubular throat.

This is the main host plant for the rare Coachella Valley grasshopper (Spaniacris deserticola).
