= Lepidocordia =

Scientific classification
- Kingdom: Plantae
- Clade: Tracheophytes
- Clade: Angiosperms
- Clade: Eudicots
- Clade: Asterids
- Order: Boraginales
- Family: Ehretiaceae
- Genus: Lepidocordia; Ducke (1925)

Synonyms
- Antrophora I.M.Johnst. (1950)

Genus of plants

Lepidocordia is a genus of flowering plants belonging to the family Ehretiaceae.

Its native range is Southern Mexico to Northern Brazil.

Species:

- Lepidocordia punctata Ducke
- Lepidocordia williamsii (I.M.Johnst.) J.S.Mill.
