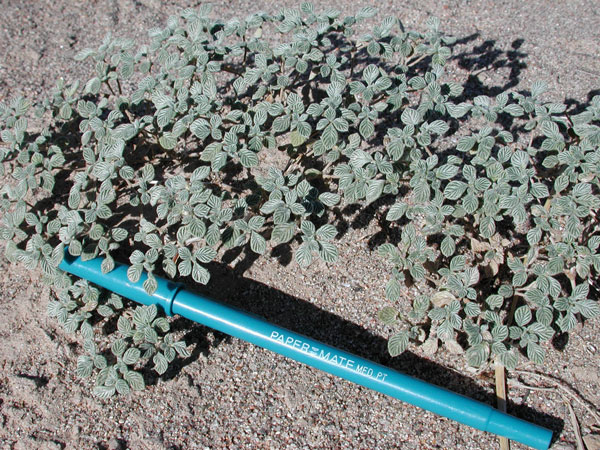
- leaves averaging 3/8 inches

Conservation status
- Secure (NatureServe)

Scientific classification
- Kingdom: Plantae
- Clade: Tracheophytes
- Clade: Angiosperms
- Clade: Eudicots
- Clade: Asterids
- Order: Boraginales
- Family: Ehretiaceae
- Genus: Tiquilia
- Species: T. plicata

Binomial name
- Tiquilia plicata (Torr.) A.T.Richardson

Synonyms
- Coldenia plicata

= Tiquilia plicata =

Species of plant

Tiquilia plicata, the fanleaf crinklemat or fan-leaved tiquilia, is a perennial, subshrub-like plant of lower elevation deserts in the family Ehretiaceae. It is found in the southwestern United States and northwestern Mexico, in the states of California, Nevada, Arizona, Sonora, and Baja California. It is a short, low-growing plant, seldom over 12 in tall.

It has purple, lavender to bluish 5-lobed flowers; also small ovate leaves, crinkly with ridges, up to 1/2 in.

== See also ==
- Calflora Database: Tiquilia plicata (fanleaf crinklemat, plicate coldenia)
- UC CalPhotos gallery — Tiquilia plicata
- Northern Arizona Flora.org: Boraginaceae (broken link)
