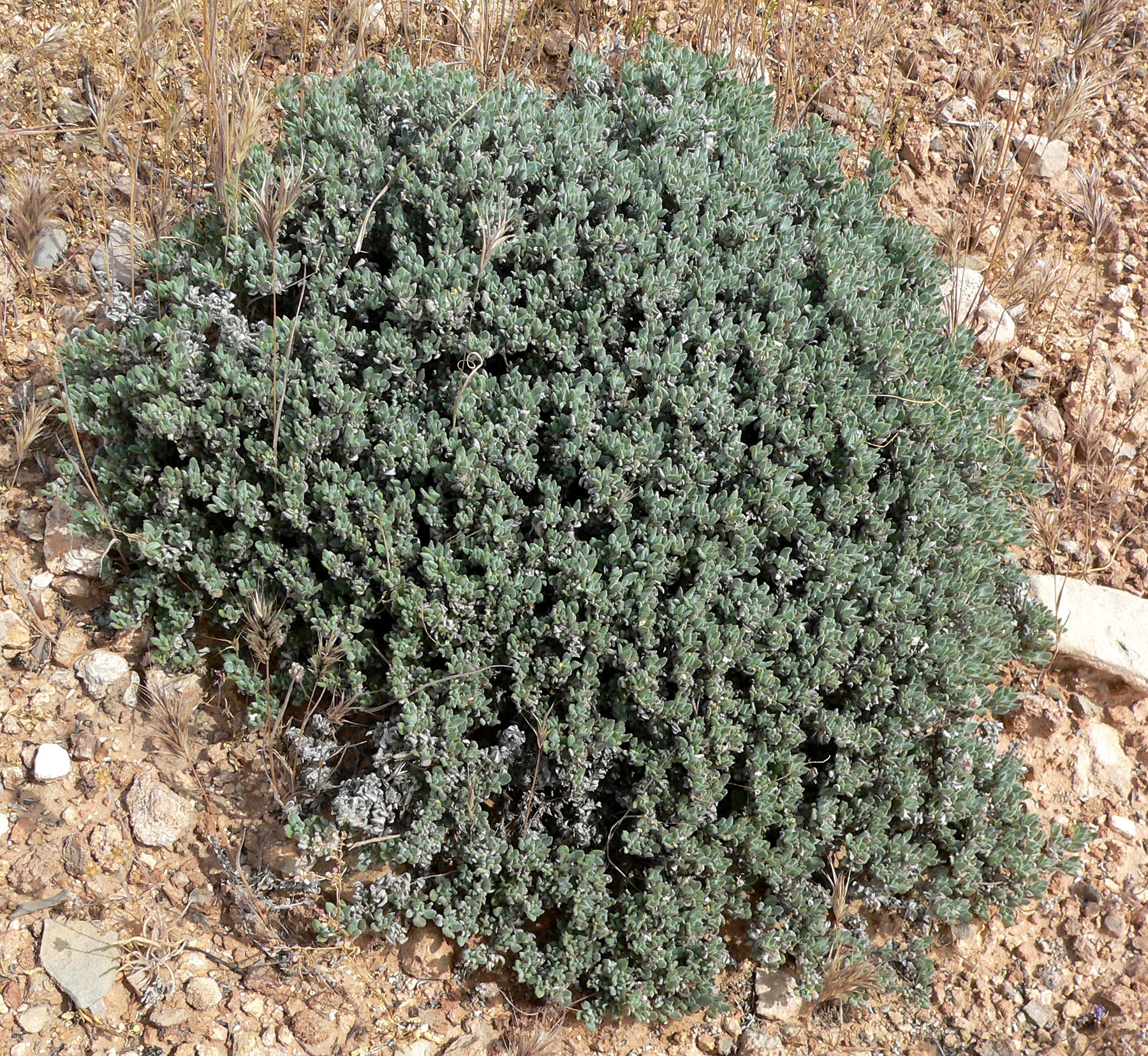
- Tiquilia canescens var canescens

Conservation status
- Secure (NatureServe)

Scientific classification
- Kingdom: Plantae
- Clade: Tracheophytes
- Clade: Angiosperms
- Clade: Eudicots
- Clade: Asterids
- Order: Boraginales
- Family: Ehretiaceae
- Genus: Tiquilia
- Species: T. canescens

Binomial name
- Tiquilia canescens (DC) A.T.Richardson

Synonyms
- Coldenia canescens

= Tiquilia canescens =

Species of plant

Tiquilia canescens, the woody crinklemat or shrubby tiquilia, is a perennial, shrub in mid- to lower-elevation desert regions in the family Ehretiaceae. It is found in the southwestern United States and Northwestern Mexico, in the states of California, Nevada, Arizona, Utah, New Mexico, Texas, Chihuahua, Sonora, and Baja California. It is a short, low-growing plant, seldom over 15 in tall.

It has pinkish to white, 5-lobed tubular flowers; leaves are ovate, gray green, and fleshy, to 1/2 - 3/4 in long.

== See also ==
- Calflora Database: Tiquilia canescens (Shrubby coldenia, woody crinklemat)
- Jepson eFlora (TJM2): Tiquilia canescens
- Close-up Photo & T. canescens description - wc.pima.edu – "Desert Ecology of Tucson, Arizona"
- Field photo: Tiquilia canescens; Article & species synopsis-leaves, flowers, etc. - gallery - naturesongs.com – "Shrubby Coldenia"—"Shrubs and Bushes of the Verde Valley & Sedona"
- Tiquilia canescens photo gallery - CalPhotos
