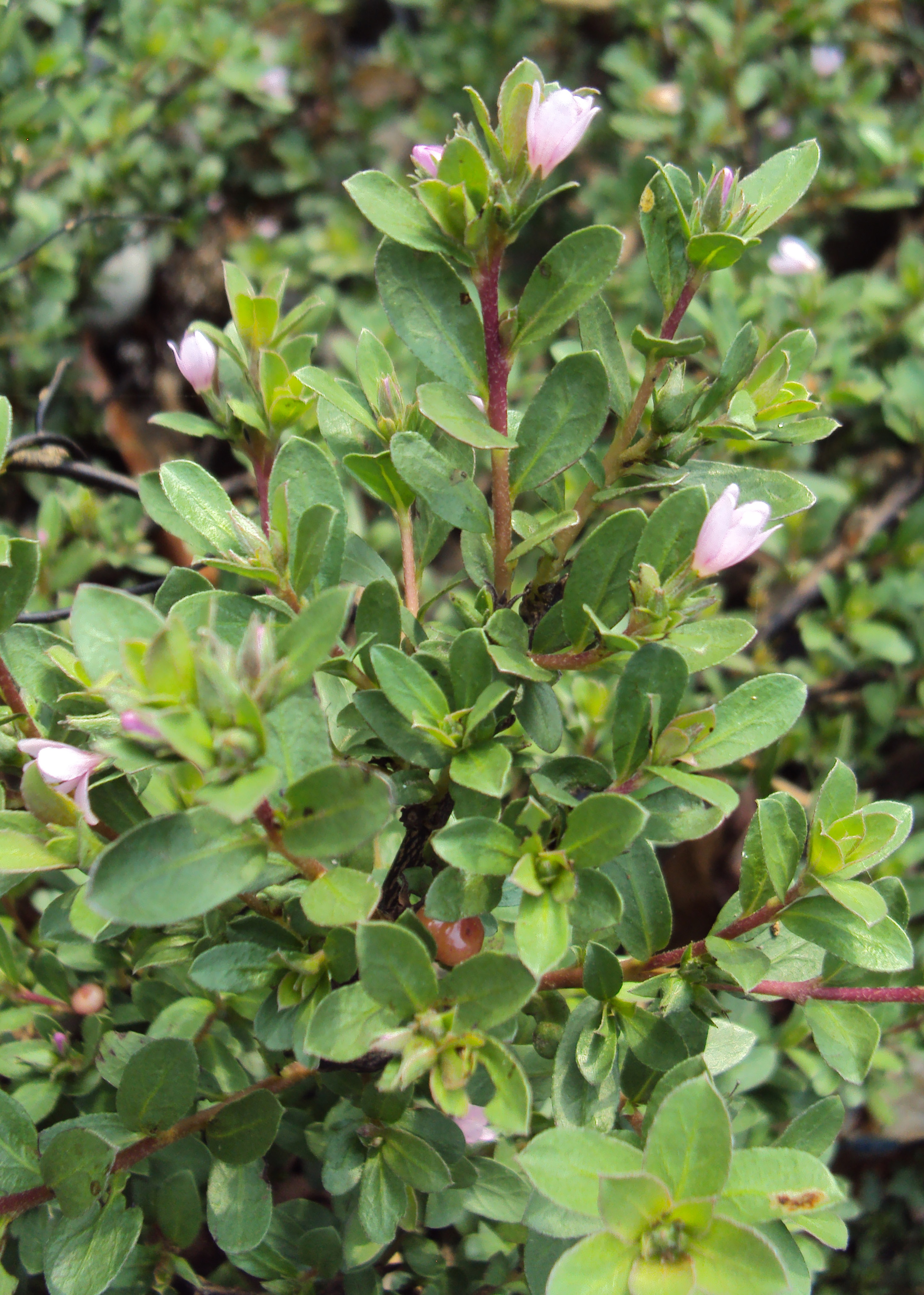
- Rotula aquatica leaves and flowers

Scientific classification
- Kingdom: Plantae
- Clade: Tracheophytes
- Clade: Angiosperms
- Clade: Eudicots
- Clade: Asterids
- Order: Boraginales
- Family: Ehretiaceae
- Genus: Rotula; Lour.

Synonyms
- Rhabdia Mart.; Zombiana Baill.

= Rotula (plant) =

Genus of flowering plants in the borage family

Rotula is a genus of flowering plants in the family Ehretiaceae. The genus has been treated as a synonym of Ehretia.

== Species ==
As of December 2025, two species were accepted by Plants of the World Online and World Flora Online:

- Rotula aquatica Lour.
- Rotula pohlii (Kuhlm.) E.F.Guim. & Mautone
