= Keraunea =

Scientific classification
- Kingdom: Plantae
- Clade: Tracheophytes
- Clade: Angiosperms
- Clade: Eudicots
- Clade: Asterids
- Order: Boraginales
- Family: Ehretiaceae
- Genus: Keraunea; Cheek & Sim.-Bianch. (2013)

Genus of plants

Keraunea is a genus of flowering plants belonging to the family Ehretiaceae.

Its native range is Eastern Brazil.

Species:

- Keraunea brasiliensis Cheek & Sim.-Bianch.
- Keraunea bullata Moonlight & D.B.O.S.Cardoso
- Keraunea capixaba Lombardi
- Keraunea confusa Moonlight & D.B.O.S.Cardoso
- Keraunea velutina Moonlight & D.B.O.S.Cardoso
