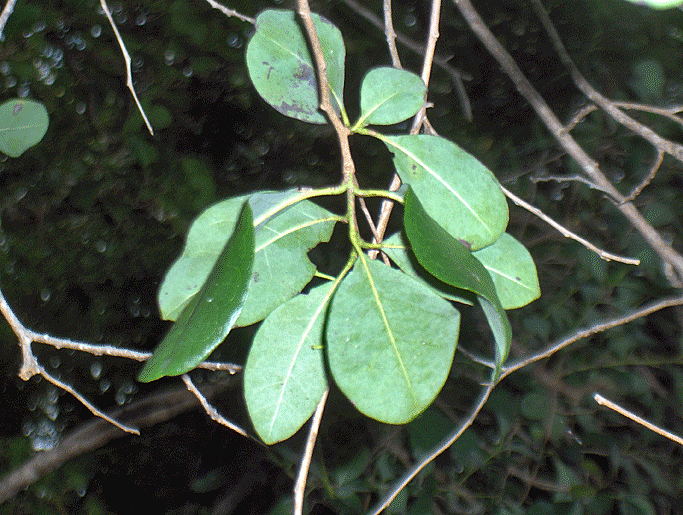
- Bourreria succulenta

Scientific classification
- Kingdom: Plantae
- Clade: Embryophytes
- Clade: Tracheophytes
- Clade: Angiosperms
- Clade: Eudicots
- Clade: Asterids
- Order: Boraginales
- Family: Ehretiaceae
- Genus: Bourreria; P.Browne (1756), nom. cons.

Type species
- Bourreria baccata Raf.

Species
- 52; see text

Synonyms
- Aymenea Faugére ex Hulth (1916); Beurreria Jacq. (1760), orth. var.; Crematomia Miers (1869); Hilsenbergia Tausch ex Meisn. (1840); Hymenesthes Miers (1875); Lutrostylis G.Don (1837); Morelosia Lex. (1824); Subrisia Raf. (1838)

= Bourreria =

Genus of flowering plants in the borage family

Bourreria is a genus of flowering plants in the family Ehretiaceae. Members of the genus are commonly known as strongbark or strongback. The generic name was chosen by Patrick Browne to honour German pharmacist Johann Ambrosius Beurer. The genus is native to the tropical Americas and to eastern Africa and Madagascar. American species are distributed from Mexico to northern South America, and in the Caribbean and Florida in the United States. The center of diversity is in the Caribbean, Central America, and Mexico. The eastern African species range from Ethiopia to Mozambique and to Madagascar, the Comoro Islands, and Mauritius.

== Species ==
52 species are accepted.

- Bourreria andrieuxii (A.DC.) Hemsl. (synonym Bourreria purpusii Brandegee) – guayabillo, lágrima de virgen, yoa prieto, jazmín del monte
- Bourreria angustifolia (J.S.Mill.) J.S.Mill. & Gottschling
- Bourreria apetala (J.S.Mill.) J.S.Mill. & Gottschling
- Bourreria aquilana G.Campos, Gottschling & J.S.Mill.
- Bourreria bolivarensis Gottschling & J.S.Mill.
- Bourreria calophylla (A.Rich.) Griseb.
- Bourreria capuronii (J.S.Mill.) J.S.Mill. & Gottschling
- Bourreria comorensis (J.S.Mill.) J.S.Mill. & Gottschling
- Bourreria costaricensis (Standl.) A.H.Gentry
- Bourreria croatii (J.S.Mill.) J.S.Mill. & Gottschling
- Bourreria darcyana (J.S.Mill.) J.S.Mill. & Gottschling
- Bourreria exsucca (L.) Jacq.
- Bourreria franciscoi Pío-León & Vega
- Bourreria grandicalyx J.S.Mill. & Sirot
- Bourreria grayumii Gottschling & J.S.Mill.
- Bourreria havanensis (Willd. ex Roem. & Schult.) Miers (synonym Bourreria cassinifolia (A.Rich.) Griseb.) – smooth strongbark
- Bourreria hintonii I.M.Johnst.
- Bourreria huanita (Lex.) Hemsl. – huanita, jazmín de palo, jazmín del istmo, guie-xoba
- Bourreria labatii (J.S.Mill.) J.S.Mill. & Gottschling
- Bourreria laxa G.Don
- Bourreria leslieae (J.S.Mill.) J.S.Mill. & Gottschling
- Bourreria linearis Miers
- Bourreria longiflora I.M.Johnst.
- Bourreria lowryana (J.S.Mill.) J.S.Mill. & Gottschling
- Bourreria lyciacea Thulin
- Bourreria microphylla Griseb.
- Bourreria moaensis Britton
- Bourreria mollis Standl. (synonym Bourreria oxyphylla Standl.) – bojón, jub a che, palo de nance, taruche, copo a max
- Bourreria moratiana (J.S.Mill.) J.S.Mill. & Gottschling
- Bourreria motaguensis Véliz, G.Campos & J.S.Mill.
- Bourreria nemoralis (Gürke) Thulin
- Bourreria orbicularis (Hutch. & E.A.Bruce) Thulin
- Bourreria petiolaris (Lam.) Thulin
- Bourreria polyneura O.E.Schulz
- Bourreria pulchra Millsp. ex Greenm. – bakalbo, kakalché, copte ché
- Bourreria quirosii Standl.
- Bourreria randrianasoloana (J.S.Mill.) J.S.Mill. & Gottschling
- Bourreria rekoi Standl.
- Bourreria rinconensis J.S.Mill.
- Bourreria ritovegana Pío-León, M.G.Chávez & L.O.Alvarado
- Bourreria rowellii I.M.Johnst.
- Bourreria rubra E.J.Lott & J.S.Mill.
- Bourreria scabra Thulin & Razafim.
- Bourreria schatziana (J.S.Mill.) J.S.Mill. & Gottschling
- Bourreria sonorae S.Watson – chocolatillo, lengua de gato
- Bourreria spathulata (Miers) Hemsl. – capulín, zalzapotzin, zapotillo
- Bourreria succulenta Jacq. (synonyms Bourreria baccata Raf. and Bourreria ovata Miers) – bodywood, chink, poisonberry, Bahamian strongbark
- Bourreria superba I.M.Johnst. – ricate
- Bourreria teitensis (Gürke) Thulin
- Bourreria tomentosa (Lam.) G.Don (synonym Bourreria radula (Poir.) G.Don) – rough strongbark
- Bourreria virgata (Sw.) G.Don – roble de guayo
