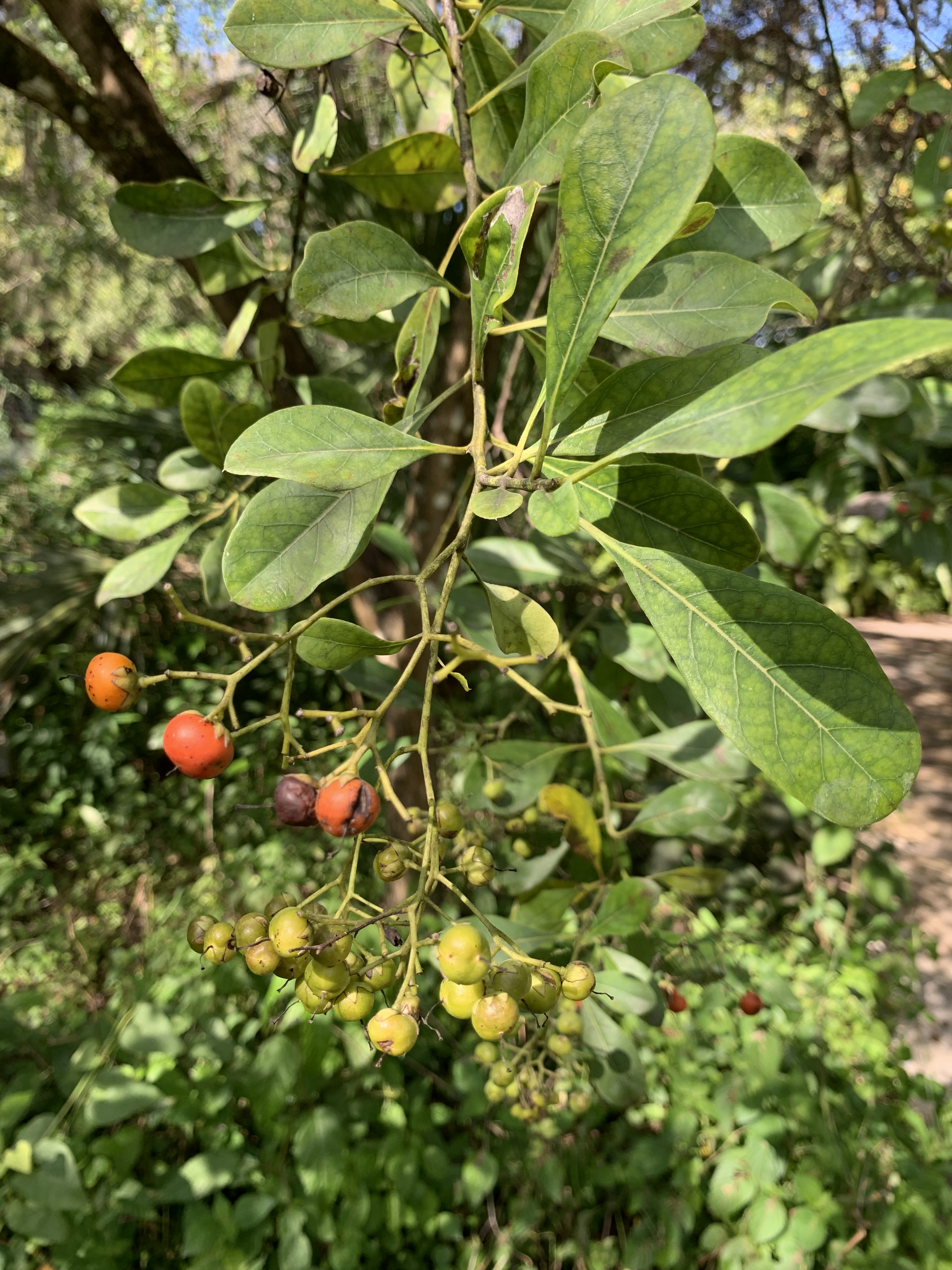

Conservation status
- Near Threatened (IUCN 2.3)(as Bourreria baccata)

Scientific classification
- Kingdom: Plantae
- Clade: Tracheophytes
- Clade: Angiosperms
- Clade: Eudicots
- Clade: Asterids
- Order: Boraginales
- Family: Ehretiaceae
- Genus: Bourreria
- Species: B. succulenta

Binomial name
- Bourreria succulenta Jacq. (1763)

Synonyms
- List: Bourreria baccata Raf. (1838); Bourreria beureria Huth (1893); Bourreria clariuscula Miers (1869); Bourreria domingensis (A.DC.) Griseb. (1862); Bourreria grandiflora (Poir.) Griseb. (1866), nom. illeg.; Bourreria ovata Miers (1869); Bourreria ovata var. hirtella O.E.Schulz (1929); Bourreria recurva Miers (1869); Bourreria revoluta Kunth (1818); Bourreria rigida Miers; Bourreria succulenta var. canescens O.E.Schulz (1910); Bourreria succulenta var. revoluta (Kunth) O.E.Schulz (1911); Bourreria succulenta f. umbrosa O.E.Schulz (1911); Bourreria tomentosa var. velutina (A.DC.) Griseb. (1861); Bourreria velutina (A.DC.) Gürke (1893); Bourreria velutina var. venosa (Miers) O.E.Schulz (1911); Bourreria venosa (Miers) Stearn (1971); Bourreria wrightii Alain (1956); Collococcus glaber (L.) Friesen (1931-1932 publ. 1933); Cordia beurreria Willd. (1798), pro syn.; Cordia bourreria L. (1759); Cordia collococca L. (1762), nom. illeg.; Cordia glabra L. (1753); Crematomia attenuata Miers (1869); Crematomia elongata Miers (1869); Crematomia molliuscula Miers (1869); Crematomia revoluta (Kunth) Miers (1869); Crematomia velutina Miers (1869); Crematomia venosa Miers (1869); Ehretia beurreria Chapm. (1860); Ehretia bourreria L. (1762); Ehretia bourreria Desf. (1802), nom. illeg.; Ehretia bourreria var. paracalophylla M.Gómez (1890); Ehretia domingensis A.DC. (1845); Ehretia exsucca Bertero ex Griseb. (1862), nom. illeg.; Ehretia grandiflora Poir. (1811); Ehretia revoluta A.DC. (1845); Ehretia rupestris Salisb. (1796); Hymenesthes nitida Miers (1875); Lithocardium glabrum (L.) Kuntze (1891); Morelosia beurera Kuntze (1891); Morelosia domingensis (A.DC.) Kuntze (1891); Morelosia ovata (Miers) Kuntze (1891); Morelosia recurva (Miers) Kuntze (1891); Morelosia revoluta (Kunth) Kuntze (1891)

= Bourreria succulenta =

Species of plant

Bourreria succulenta is a species of flowering plant in the family Ehretiaceae. It is a tree native to Caribbean islands including Cuba, Hispaniola, Jamaica, Puerto Rico, and the Lesser Antilles, and to Florida, southern Mexico, and northern Venezuela. It is known by several synonyms, including Bourreria baccata and B. velutina. Common names include cherry, currant tree, poisonberry, chink, and bodywood.
