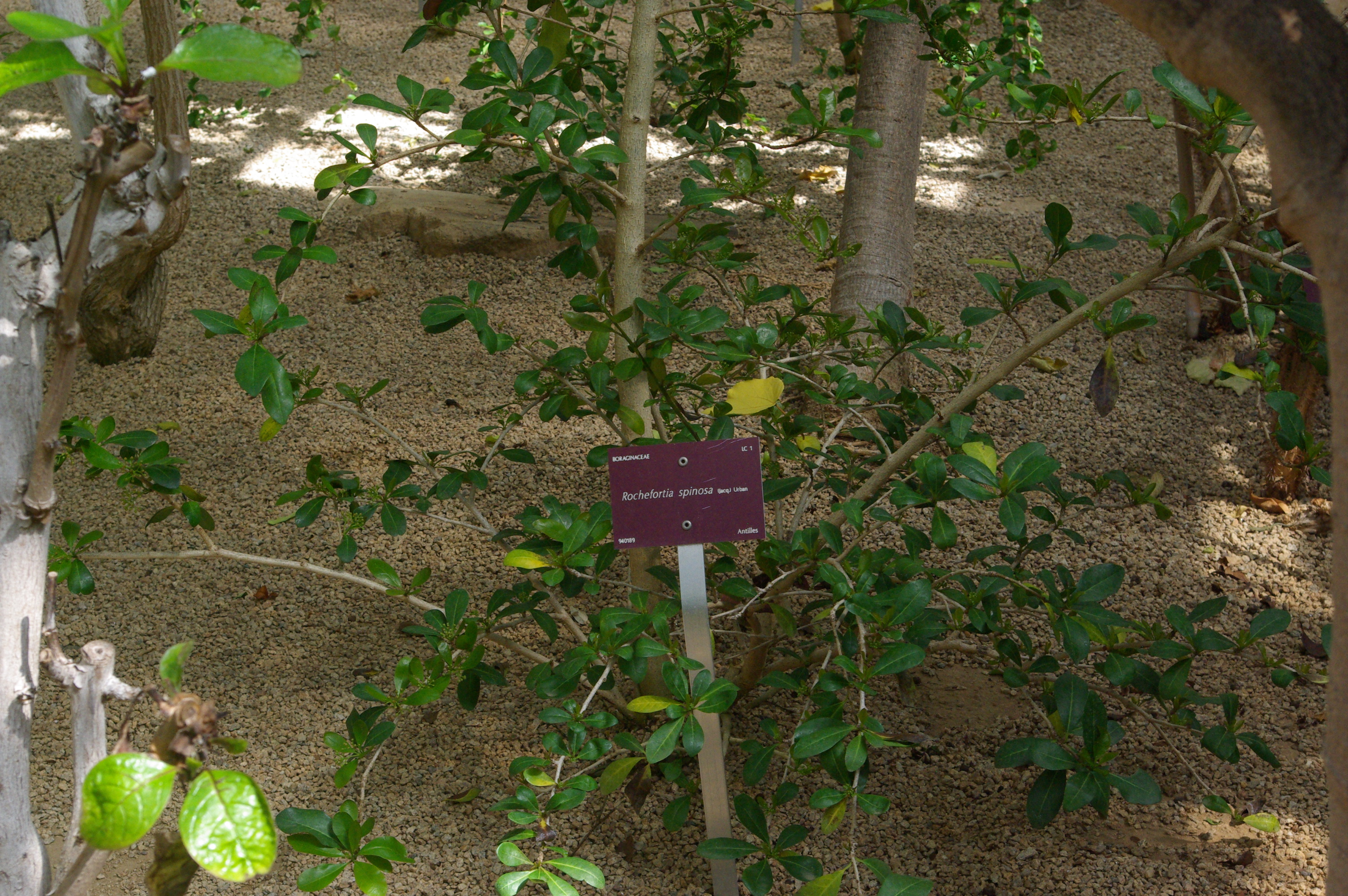
- Rochefortia spinosa

Scientific classification
- Kingdom: Plantae
- Clade: Embryophytes
- Clade: Tracheophytes
- Clade: Angiosperms
- Clade: Eudicots
- Clade: Asterids
- Order: Boraginales
- Family: Ehretiaceae
- Genus: Rochefortia; Sw. (1788)

Type species
- Rochefortia cuneata Sw.

Synonyms
- Diplostylis H.Karst. & Triana (1854 publ. 1855)

= Rochefortia =

Genus of flowering plants in the borage family

Rochefortia is a genus of flowering plants in the family Ehretiaceae.

Its species are native to Mexico and Central America, the Caribbean, and Colombia, Peru, and Venezuela in South America.

== Species ==
As of December 2025, Plants of the World Online accepted nine species:

- Rochefortia acanthophora (A.DC.) Griseb.
- Rochefortia bahamensis Britton
- Rochefortia barloventensis Irimia & Gottschling
- Rochefortia cubensis Britton & P.Wilson, syn. R. oblanceata G.Klotz
- Rochefortia cuneata Sw.
- Rochefortia lundellii Camp
- Rochefortia oblongata Urb. & Ekman
- Rochefortia spinosa (Jacq.) Urb.
- Rochefortia stellata Britton & P.Wilson, syns R. holguinensis G.Klotz, R. septentrionalis G.Klotz, R. victoriniana G.Klotz

Some of the synonyms listed above are accepted as species by World Flora Online.
