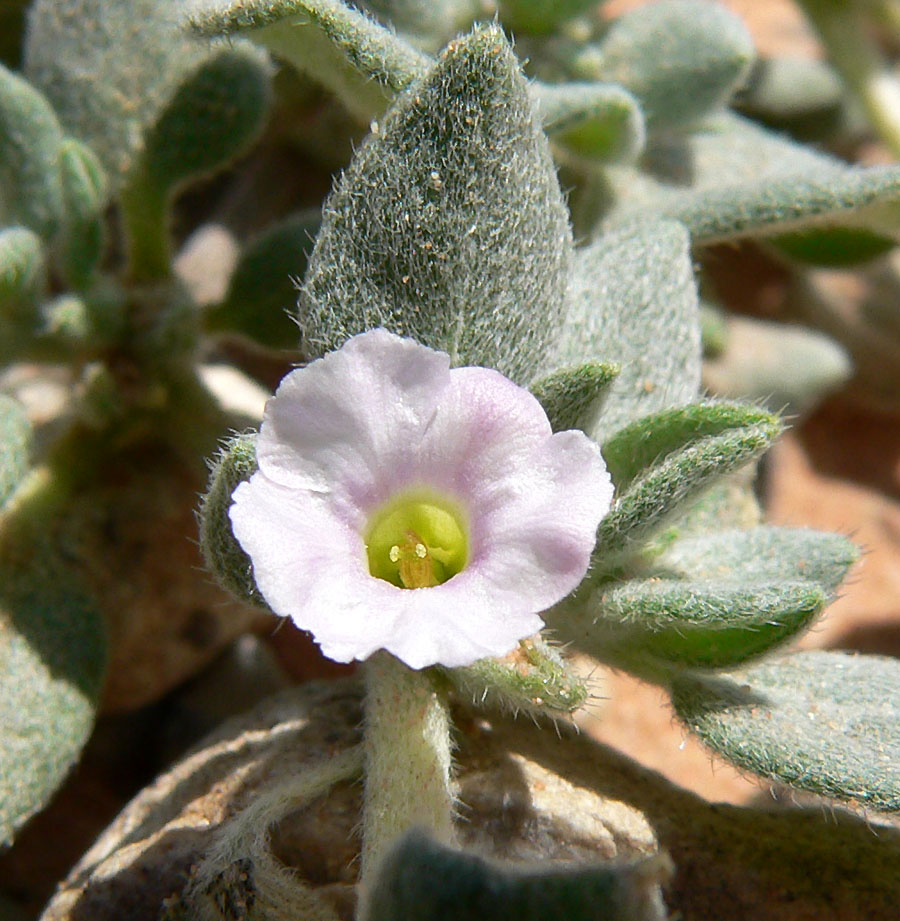
- Tiquilia canescens

Scientific classification
- Kingdom: Plantae
- Clade: Embryophytes
- Clade: Tracheophytes
- Clade: Angiosperms
- Clade: Eudicots
- Clade: Asterids
- Order: Boraginales
- Family: Ehretiaceae
- Genus: Tiquilia; Pers. (1805)

Type species
- Tiquilia dichotoma (Ruiz & Pav.) Pers.

Species
- 28; see text

Synonyms
- Eddya Torr. & A.Gray (1857); Galapagoa Hook.f. (1845); Ptilocalyx Torr. & A.Gray (1857); Stegnocarpus (DC.) Torr. (1855); Tiquiliopsis A.Heller (1906); Triquiliopsis A.Heller ex Rydb. (1917)

= Tiquilia =

Genus of flowering plants in the borage family

Tiquilia is a genus of flowering plants in the family Ehretiaceae. The 28 species in this genus are known by the common name crinklemat. They are native to the Western Hemisphere and are mostly found in desert regions.

== Species ==
28 species are accepted.

- Tiquilia atacamensis (Phil.) A.T.Richardson
- Tiquilia canescens (DC.) A.T.Richardson – woody crinklemat
- Tiquilia conspicua (I.M.Johnst.) A.T.Richardson
- Tiquilia cuspidata (I.M.Johnst.) A.T.Richardson
- Tiquilia darwinii (Hook.f.) A.T.Richardson
- Tiquilia dichotoma (Ruiz & Pav.) Pers.
- Tiquilia elongata (Rusby) A.T.Richardson
- Tiquilia ferreyrae (I.M.Johnst.) A.T.Richardson
- Tiquilia fusca Hook.f.
- Tiquilia galapagoa (J.T.Howell) A.T.Richardson
- Tiquilia gossypina (Woot. & Standl.) A.T.Richardson – Texas crinklemat
- Tiquilia grandiflora (Phil.) A.T.Richardson
- Tiquilia greggii (Torr. & A.Gray) A.T.Richardson – plumed crinklemat
- Tiquilia hispidissima (Torr. & A.Gray) A.T.Richardson – hairy crinklemat
- Tiquilia hunteri A.T.Richardson
- Tiquilia latior (I.M.Johnst.) A.T.Richardson – matted crinklemat
- Tiquilia litoralis (Phil.) A.T.Richardson
- Tiquilia mexicana (S.Watson) A.T.Richardson – Mexican crinklemat
- Tiquilia nesiotica (J.T.Howell) A.T.Richardson – Gray matplant
- Tiquilia nuttallii (Benth.) A. T. Richardson – Nuttall's crinklemat
- Tiquilia palmeri (A.Gray) A.T.Richardson – Palmer's crinklemat
- Tiquilia paronychoides (Phil.) A.T.Richardson – Peruvian sand flower
- Tiquilia plicata (Torr.) A.T.Richardson – plaited crinklemat, fanleaf crinklemat
- Tiquilia purpusii (Brandegee) A.T.Richardson
- Tiquilia simulans (I.M.Johnst.) A.T.Richardson
- Tiquilia tacnensis A.T.Richardson
- Tiquilia tuberculata A.T.Richardson
- Tiquilia turneri A.T.Richardson
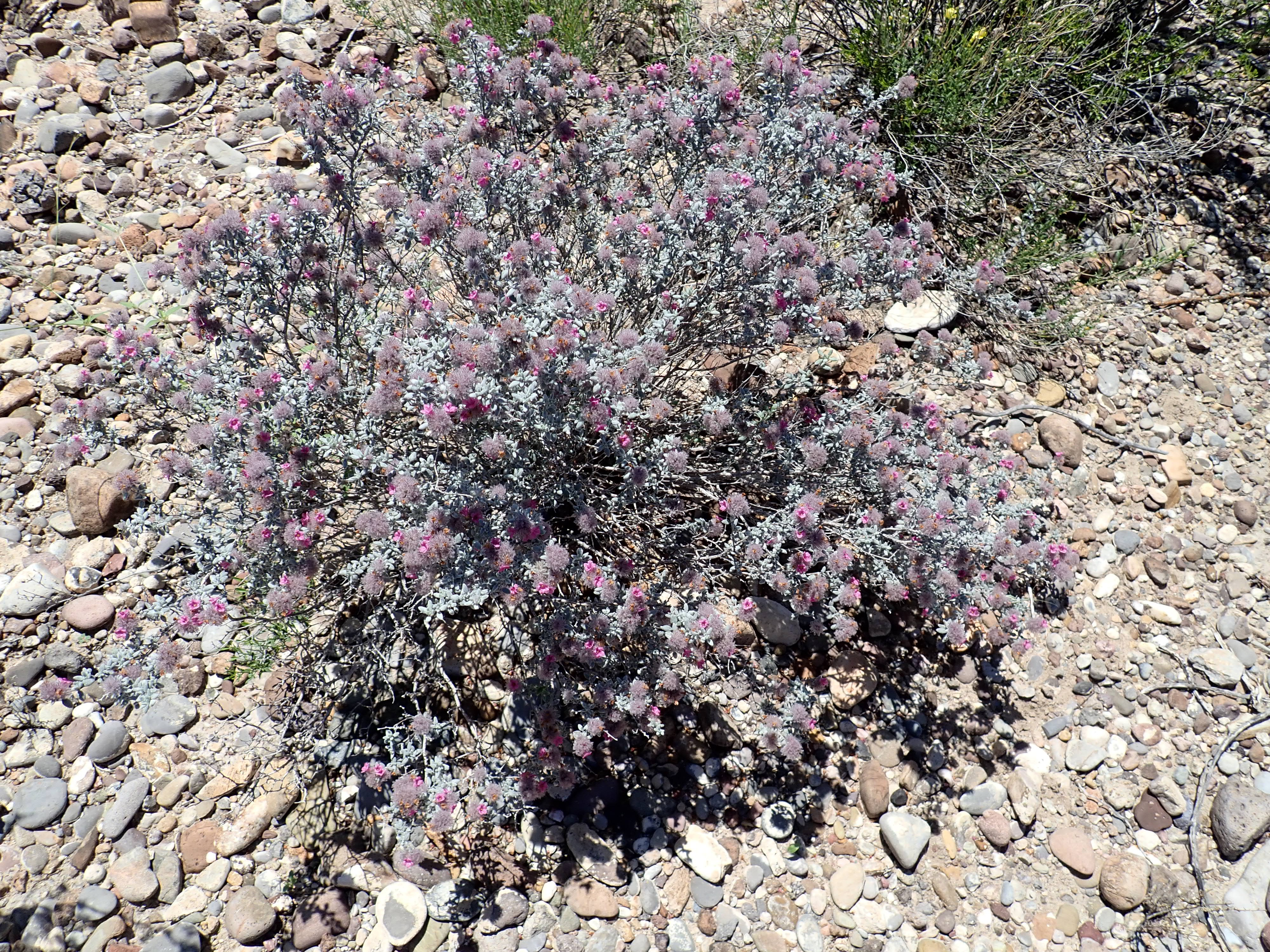
T. greggii, or "plumed crinklemat", in natural state

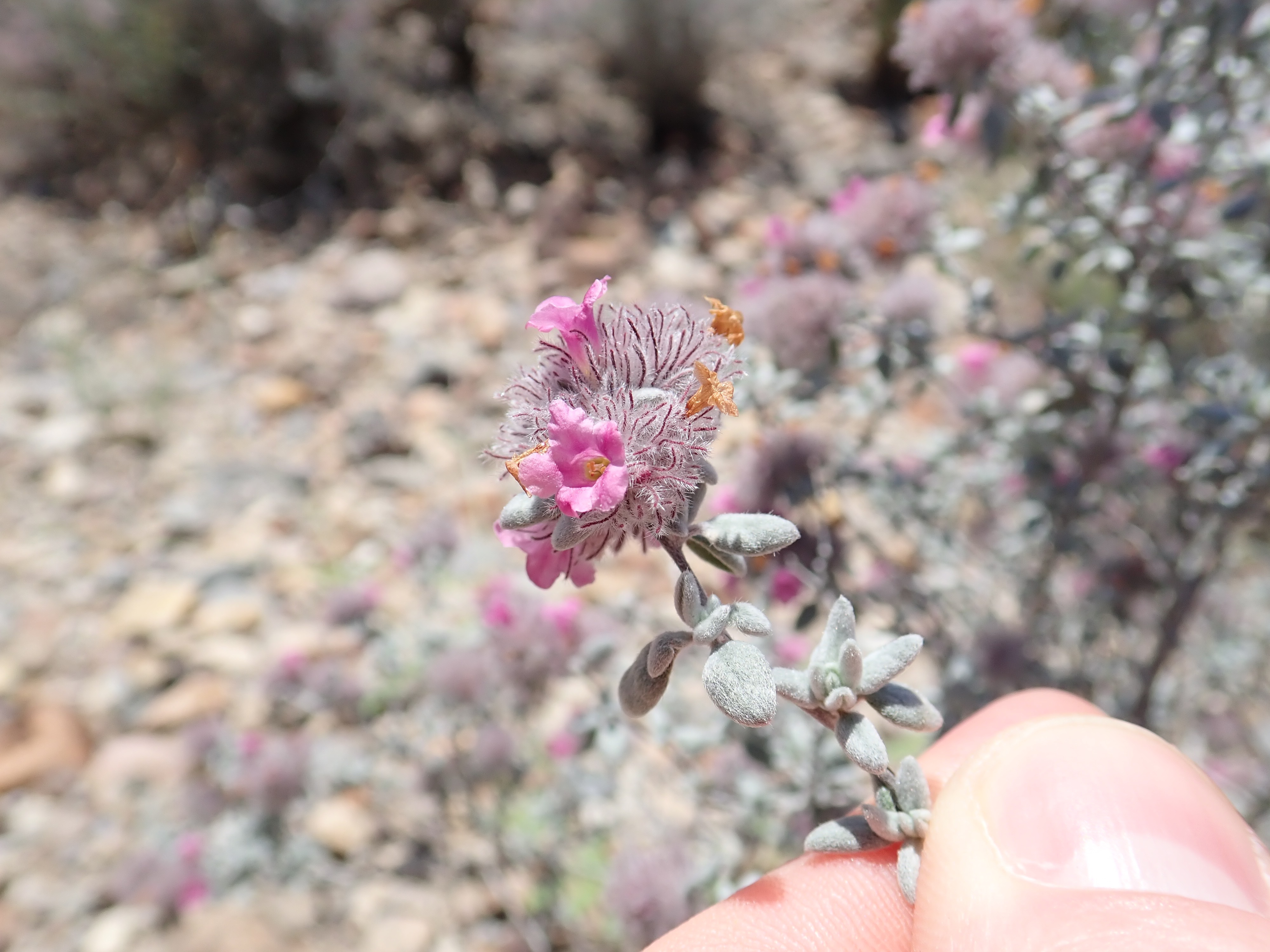
T. greggii, or "plumed crinklemat", detail of inflorescence
