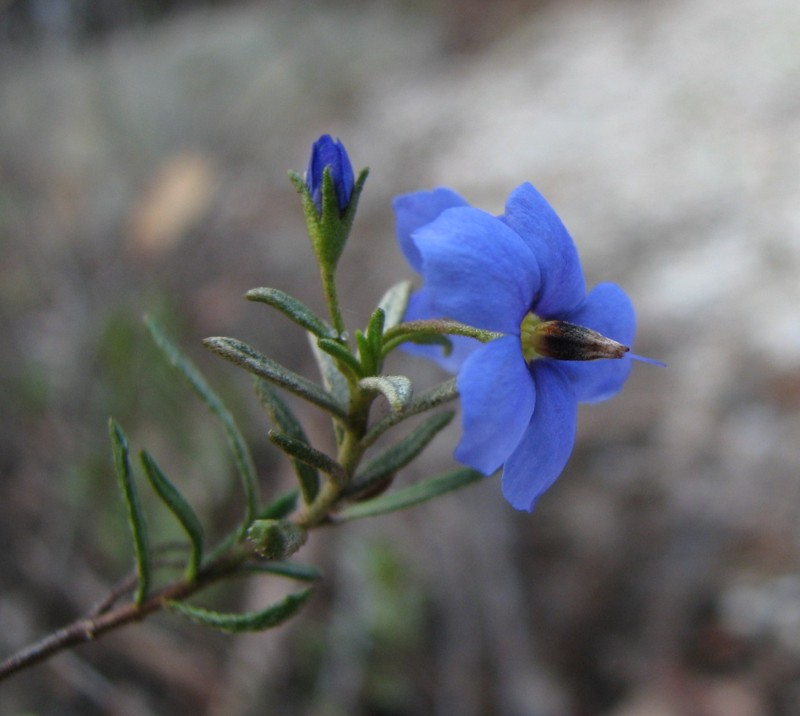
- Halgania cyanea

Scientific classification
- Kingdom: Plantae
- Clade: Tracheophytes
- Clade: Angiosperms
- Clade: Eudicots
- Clade: Asterids
- Order: Boraginales
- Family: Ehretiaceae
- Genus: Halgania; Gaudich. (1829)

Species
- 16; see text

= Halgania =

Genus of flowering plants in the borage family

Halgania is a genus of small shrubs in the family Ehretiaceae. The genus comprises about 20 species that are endemic to Australia. Halgania is named for Emmanuel Halgan, a vice-admiral in the French Navy.

== Features ==
Halgania species are spreading to erect shrubs or subshrubs up to 1.2 m high. Leaves are simple, alternating along the stem and membranaceous or leathery. The leaf margin is entire or toothed to serrate and often revolute. Herbaceous stems and leaves can be glabrous but also covered with glandular hairs, simple or bifurcating (resembling cleats, "dolabriform") hairs. In some species, the surface is also covered with a viscose layer of exudates.

The flowers have a calyx of five more or less connected sepals. The 5-parted corolla is blue to violet, rarely white and flat or widely cup-shaped, similar to Solanum-flowers. The five stamens have short filaments and long yellow to yellow-violet anthers. They are connected via intertwining hairs to an anther cone. The pollen sacs open into a central channel, through which the style later emerges. Dusty pollen is released through a pore made by beak-like appendage of the anthers through buzz pollination. Fruits are two- or four chambered dry drupes.

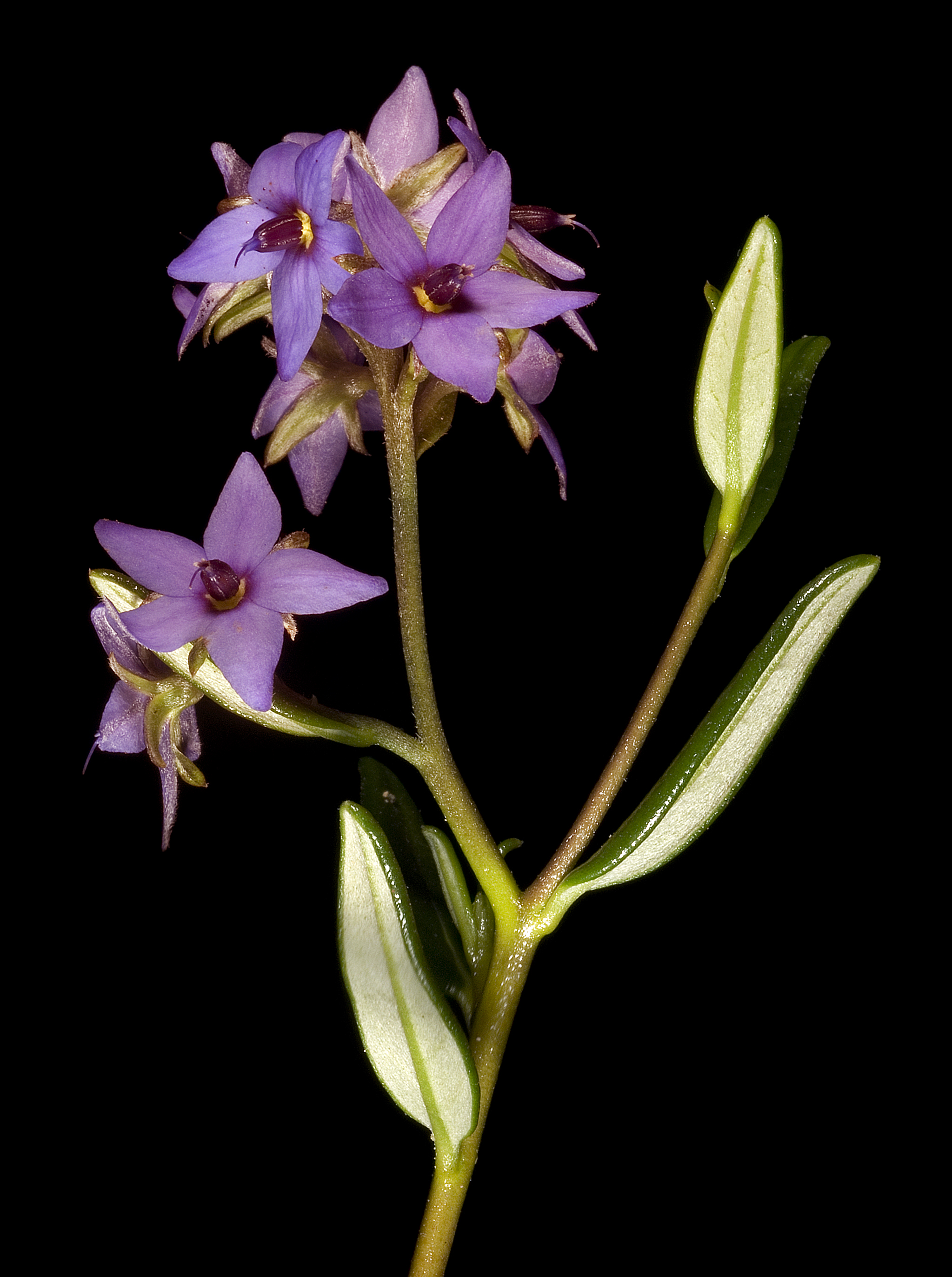
Halgania andromedifolia

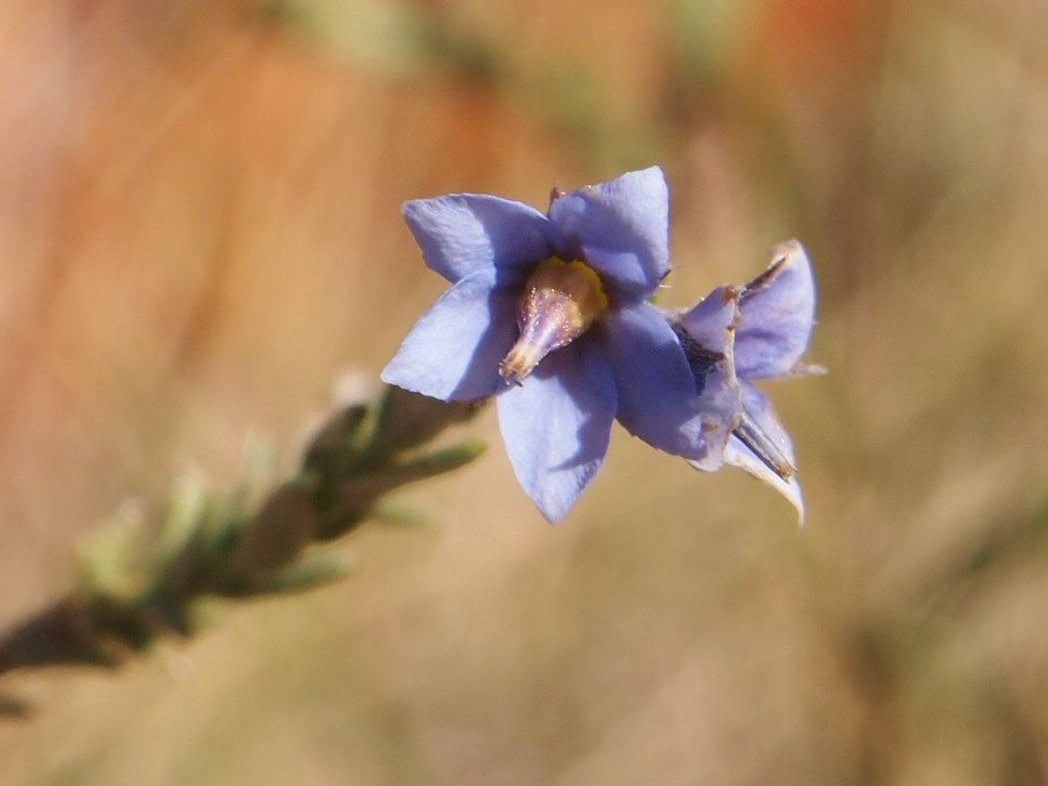
Halgania erecta

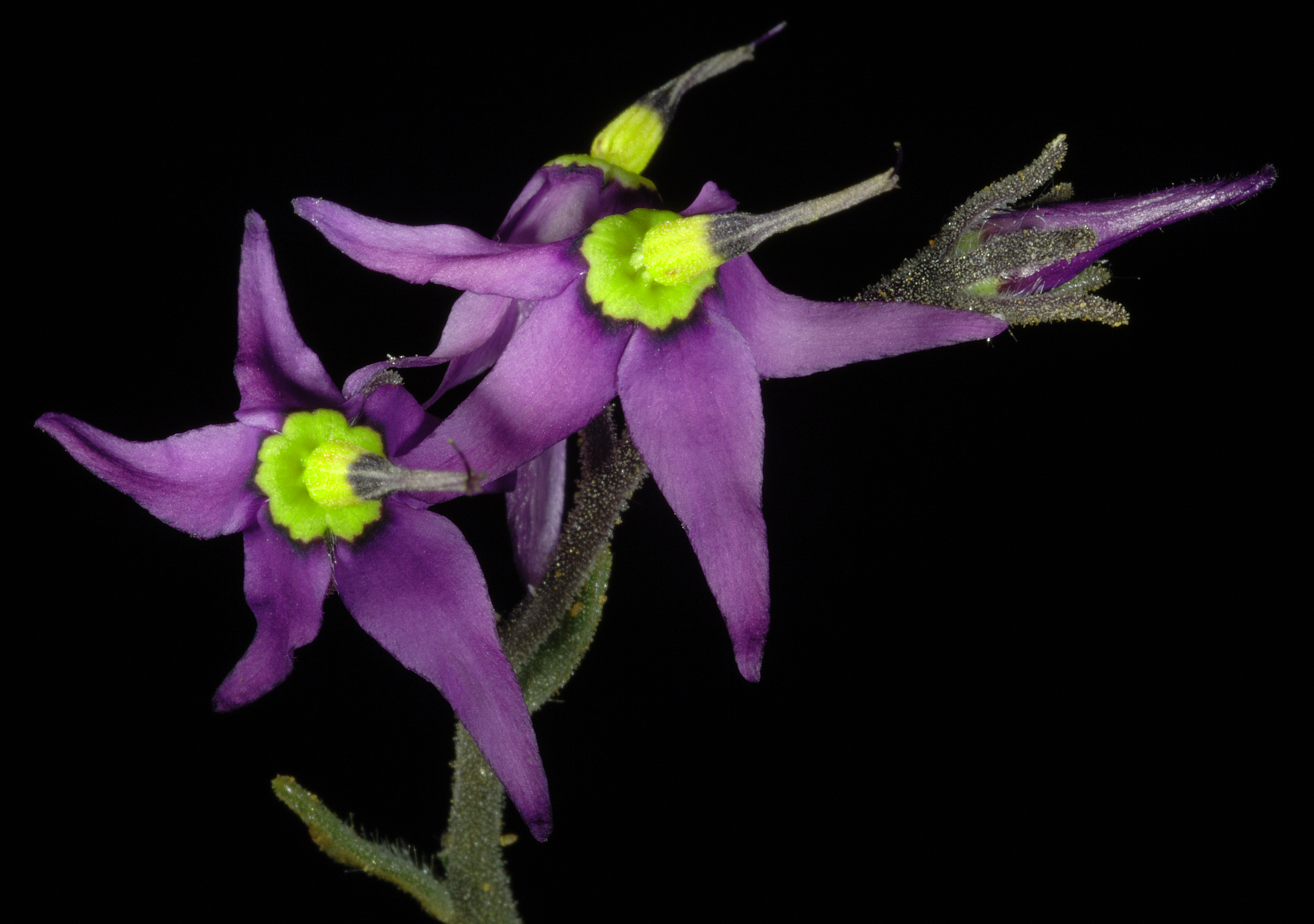
Halgania solanacea

== Systematics ==
Halgania is a genus that only occurs in Australia, its sister group is still unknown. There are three clades in the genus. The H. andromedifolia-clade (H. andromedifolia and H. rigida) occurs exclusively in Western Australia and the sepals are often conspicuously inqually sized. The anther appendage is short. Species of the H. anagalloides-clade are the only ones to have dolabriform hairs, and they occur in all states of Australia. Their anther appendage is of variable size. The H. littoralis-clade contains the type species of the genus. Its members have neither dolabriform hairs, nor inqually sized sepals, and always long anther appendages. All species of the H. littoralis-clade occur in Western Australia or Northern Territory. Also four-chambered drupes only occur in this group.

== Distribution ==
Halgania species occur in all states of Australia. They grow in well-drained soils and sand in dry climates, except to the hyper-arid regions of the Nullarbor Plain. The species are also absent from temperate and tropical areas.

== Species ==
Sixteen species are accepted.

- Halgania anagalloides Endl.
- Halgania andromedifolia Behr & F.Muell. – Lavender halgania, smooth halgania
- Halgania argyrophylla Diels
- Halgania bebrana Oldfield & F.Muell.
- Halgania brachyrhyncha Peter G.Wilson
- Halgania corymbosa Lindl.
- Halgania cyanea Lindl. – Rough halgania
- Halgania erecta Ewart & B.Rees
- Halgania glabra J.M.Black
- Halgania gustafsenii F.Muell.
- Halgania integerrima Endl.
- Halgania lavandulacea Endl. – Blue bush
- Halgania littoralis Gaudich.
- Halgania preissiana Lehm.
- Halgania sericiflora Benth.
- Halgania solanacea F.Muell.
