= Quitobaquito, Arizona =

Populated place in Pima County, Arizona

- Populated place
- Location within the state of Arizona Quitobaquito (the United States)
- Coordinates: 31°56′24″N 113°01′03″W
- Country: United States
- State: Arizona
- County: Pima
- Elevation: 1,080 ft (330 m)
- Time zone: UTC-7 (Mountain (MST))
  - Summer (DST): UTC-7 (MST)
- Area code: 520
- GNIS feature ID: 23947

Quitobaquito, also known as Quitobaquita or Quitovaquita, is a populated place situated in Pima County, Arizona, United States. Its current name became official in 1917 as a result of a decision by the Board on Geographic Names. It is also the name of the nearby Quitobaquito Hills. It has an estimated elevation of 1,083 feet (330 m) above sea level.
