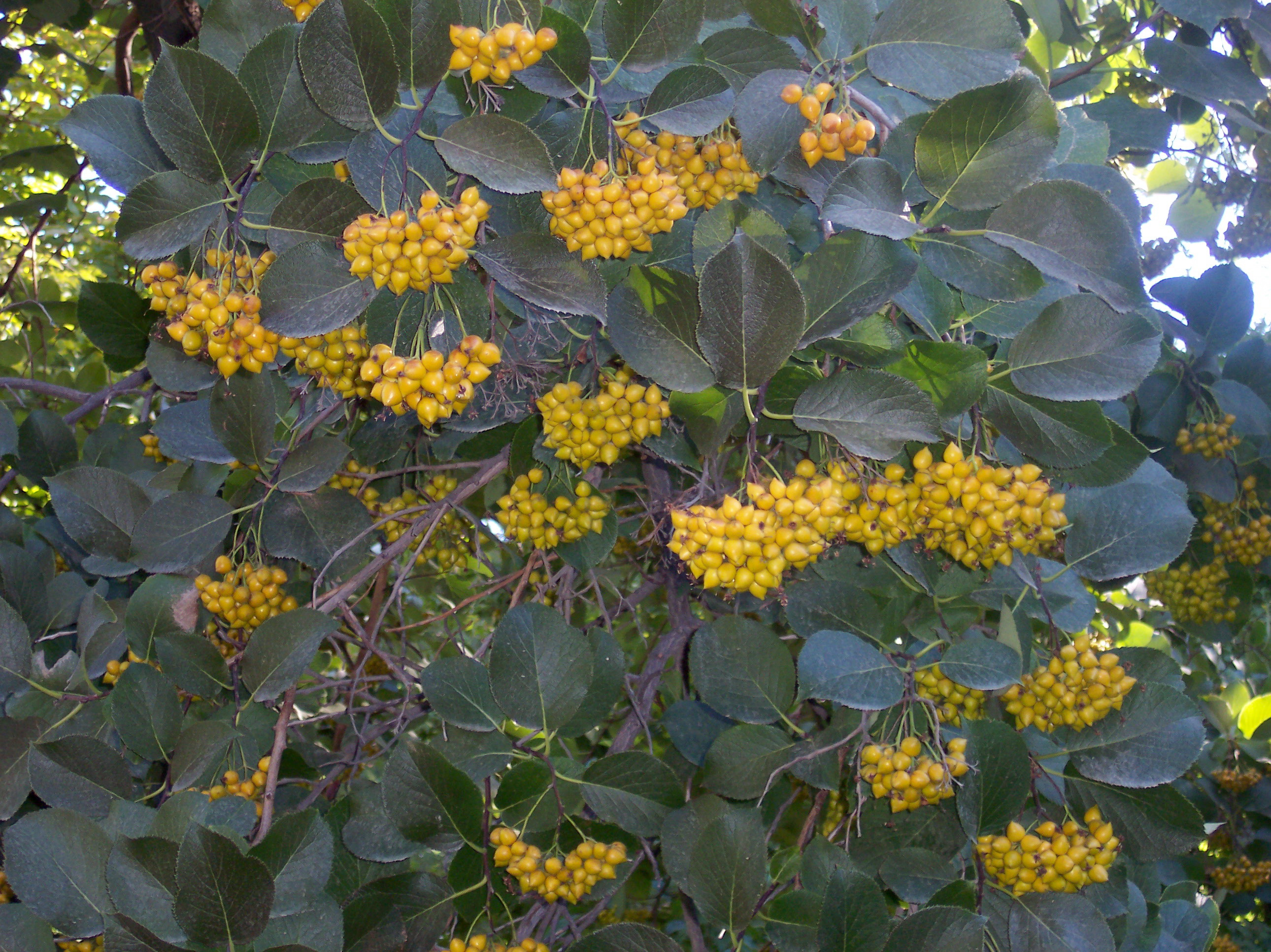
- Ehretia dicksonii var. japonica

Scientific classification
- Kingdom: Plantae
- Clade: Tracheophytes
- Clade: Angiosperms
- Clade: Eudicots
- Clade: Asterids
- Order: Boraginales
- Family: Ehretiaceae; Mart.

Genera
- See text

= Ehretiaceae =

Ramily of flowering plants

Ehretiaceae is a family of the flowering plants in the order Boraginales.

== Genera ==
As of December 2025, World Flora Online accepted eight genera:

- Bourreria P.Browne
- Ehretia P.Browne
- Halgania Gaudich.
- Keraunea Cheek & Sim.-Bianch.
- Lepidocordia Ducke
- Rochefortia Sw.
- Rotula Lour.
- Tiquilia Pers.
