= Tohono Oʼodham (disambiguation) =

The Tohono Oʼodham are a Native American people of the United States and Mexico.

Tohono Oʼodham may also refer to:

- Tohono Oʼodham language
- Tohono Oʼodham Nation, a federally recognized tribe in the U.S.
