= Juan Dolores =

Native American linguist

- Born: June 24, 1880; Near the Mexican-American border in Southern Arizona
- Died: July 19, 1948 (aged 68); Tucson, Arizona
- Burial place: Vamori, Arizona

Juan Dolores (June 24, 1884 – July 19, 1948), was a Tohono O'odham Native American of the Koló:di dialect, acting as one of the first linguists of the O'odham language. He is the first person to document traditional Tohono O'odham fables and myths, and worked with Alfred L. Kroeber to document the first studies into the O'odham language's grammar, which would eventually be compiled and published alongside other documents in The Language of the Papago of Arizona by John Alden Mason.

In addition to his contributions to research into O'odham grammar, he worked on his own notes for the University of California.

== Early life ==
Dolores was born June 24, 1880, in the then Arizona Territory near the Mexican-American border. Early in his childhood, his father José Dolores moved the family to what was then called the Papago Reservation near Tucson, Arizona, so that he could be sent to a government school. His mother's name is unknown. Dolores was exposed to the Koló:di dialect of the O'odham language through family, the Spanish language through his mother, and English in school. After he spent "a few painful years" in government schooling, Dolores later relocated to New Mexico and then to Lawrence, Kansas. For college, he came to the Hampton Institute in Hampton, Virginia, in October 1898 when he was 18, graduating on December 9, 1901, at the age of 21. The coursed involved summer farm work, where they were sent east to New England and other nearby states. Dolores stayed at the Institute an additional year for the post-graduate business course in 1902.

After finishing college, Dolores moved back west, working as a construction worker across the Western United States.

== Alfred L. Kroeber and John A. Mason ==
Dolores first met with A. L. Kroeber around 1909 in San Francisco, California, where he was invited to act as an informant into the O'odham language. According to Kroeber himself, he "agreed cheerfully, became increasingly interested, and proved to be a careful analyst". Kroeber spent close to a month documenting the language himself until he started to become busy with work and suggested to Dolores that he be taught to write O'odham himself. After being taught, he went on to write various studies into the O'odham language, alongside acting as a guard in the Museum of Anthropology in the University of California, Berkeley. Later in 1918 to 1919, he became a "Research Fellow" for the university, continuing to work in documentation. In the fall of 1919, a Dr. Elsie Clews Parsons gave John Alden Mason, a linguist knowledgeable of the Tepecano language, the opportunity to meet Dolores among other Tohono O'odham of that area, where Dolores himself would aid in his project The Language of the Papago of Arizona.

Pay was something that swayed Dolores's position from the University, and so, from 1912 to 1936, he would often bounce between his contract work and his study. In 1936, he was sent to Chicago, Illinois, to participate in a Works Progress Administration study into Mexican labor under the sponsorship of W. Lloyd Warner. During most of 1937, he spent time back in Arizona with his family and other O'odham before returning permanently to Berkeley as Preparator to the Museum of Anthropology later that year.

== Retirement and death ==
Dolores continued his time in the Museum of Anthropology until he retired on June 30, 1948, due to age. Years prior to his death, he had sustained "...physical shocks-- a bad fall from a scaffold, a ruptured appendix, a second concussion from a robbery hold-up and beating." Dolores returned to Tucson, Arizona to live with his grandnieces until his death on July 19, 1948. He was buried in Vamori, Arizona.

== Body of works ==
Dolores's main work was in documenting the O'odham language. To this end, he worked on Papago Verb Stems, Papago Noun Stems, Papago Nicknames, and Notes on Papago Color Designations. He also aided in John A. Mason's work The Language of the Papago of Arizona.

The O'odham language, while a priority, was not the only area of culture he examined in his documents. Dolores worked in retranscription of earlier fables written by "Kurath". These fables included retellings of the Creation myth, the Ho'ok Story, and the children's story The Coyote and the Skunk. Aside from these, he also transcribed several oral stories directly, those being variations of the Creation myth, a variety of traditional songs, speeches, and autobiographies, including his own. Information on any of these seem to be scarce today.
