= Edward Franklin Castetter =

American botanist (1896–1978)

Edward Franklin Castetter (March 11, 1896 - February 10, 1978) was an American ethnobotanist who studied the use of plants by Native American people in arid environments. He was a professor and served as the chair of the Department of Biology at the University of New Mexico. The biology building at UNM is named Castetter Hall in his honor.

== Personal life ==
Edward Franklin Castetter was born on March 11, 1896, in Shamokin, Pennsylvania.

== Career ==
Castetter received a M.S. at Pennsylvania State College in 1921 and went on to study plant morphology at Iowa State College of Agriculture and Mechanic Arts where he received his Ph.D. in 1924. Castetter was an associate professor of botany at Iowa State College, before taking a position as head of the biology department at the University of New Mexico in 1928. He served as chair of the department until 1956. He also served as Dean of the Graduate School starting in 1949 and the Academic Vice President of the university from 1956 until retirement in 1961.

In 1930, Castetter established one of the first graduate programs for ethnobotany in the United States at the University of New Mexico. Castetter and his students recorded plant use by Native Americans in Southwest. From 1938 to 1940, he and Willis H. Bell spent autumns studying the Pima people. Castetter and Bell also studied the Tohono O'odham, Mohave, and Puebloan peoples.

He served as president of the AAAS Southwestern and Rocky Mountain Division in 1956.

== Selected works ==
- A systematic study of squashes and pumpkins (1927) by Castetter and Erwin
- Uncultivated native plants used as sources of food (1935)
- The ethnobiology of the Papago Indians (1935) by Castetter and Underhill
- The ethnobiology of the Chiricahua and Mescalero Apache: The use of plants for foods, beverages and narcotics (1936) by Castetter and Opler
- The aboriginal utilization of the tall cacti in the American Southwest (1937)
- The utilization of mesquite and screwbean by the aborigines in the American Southwest (1937) by Bell and Castetter
- The early utilization and the distribution of agave in the American southwest (1938) by Castetter, Bell, and Grove
- The utilization of yucca, sotol, and beargrass by the aborigines in the American Southwest (1941) by Bell and Castetter
- Pima and Papago Indian agriculture (1942) by Castetter and Bell
- Early tobacco utilization and cultivation in the American southwest (1943)
- Yuman Indian agriculture (1951) by Castetter and Bell
- The vegetation of New Mexico (1956)
