= Indigenous conflicts on the Mexico–United States barrier =

Several Indigenous peoples who live on the United States–Mexico border have objected to the construction of a border wall on their territories and what they perceive as the militarization of the border by the United States government. The US–Mexico border crosses several Indigenous territories and divides these communities. The barrier erected between the United States and Mexico cuts through and/or affects at least 29 Indigenous tribes, which include Kumeyaay Nation and Tohono O'odham.

Increased efforts by the US government at border control, beginning in the 1980s, and the construction of a physical border wall, beginning in the 1990s, along the US-Mexico boundary, have significantly impacted tribal nations. Whether it be disrupting the movement of tribal members across the US-Mexico border by requiring the use of a specific port of entry or specific documentation or the destruction of Native territory, the border had significant implications. In response, the Tohono O'odham and the Kumeyaay nations, among others, have engaged in protests against the barrier.

== History ==
=== Creation of the US-Mexico border ===
The border between the United States and Mexico was formed through treaties and negotiations that often failed to include Indigenous peoples in the negotiations and conversations.

In 1848, the Treaty of Guadalupe Hidalgo was signed after the Mexican-American War, and it drew a demarcation between the United States and Mexico. Additionally, Article XI of this treaty puts Indigenous tribes under the control of the United States and also allows restrictions of Indigenous movements across the border, while also honoring land claims of Mexican citizens. Some tribal nations were able to obtain said land grants, but those tribes who did not live in established villages were unable to receive land grants. Thus, their territory rights were not honored in this treaty nor by the United States. Native Americans, including those who were impacted by this treaty, were excluded from conversations and negotiations between the United States and Mexico. Furthermore, governments of the United States and Mexico both failed to consider Indigenous homelands and sites of spiritual significance when creating the border. It is additionally argued creation of the border also included creation of citizenship which led to the restriction of free travel and a plethora of other issues.

Around five years after the Treaty of Guadalupe Hidalgo was signed, the Gadsden Purchase modified the earlier boundary For $10 million, United States bought 30,000 square miles which makes up present-day the southernmost regions of southern Arizona and southern New Mexico. A primary reason for this purchase was the desire to build a transcontinental railroad. The same protections provided in the Treaty of Guadalupe Hidalgo still applied to the residents in this newly added tract of land.

=== Border wall construction and militarization ===
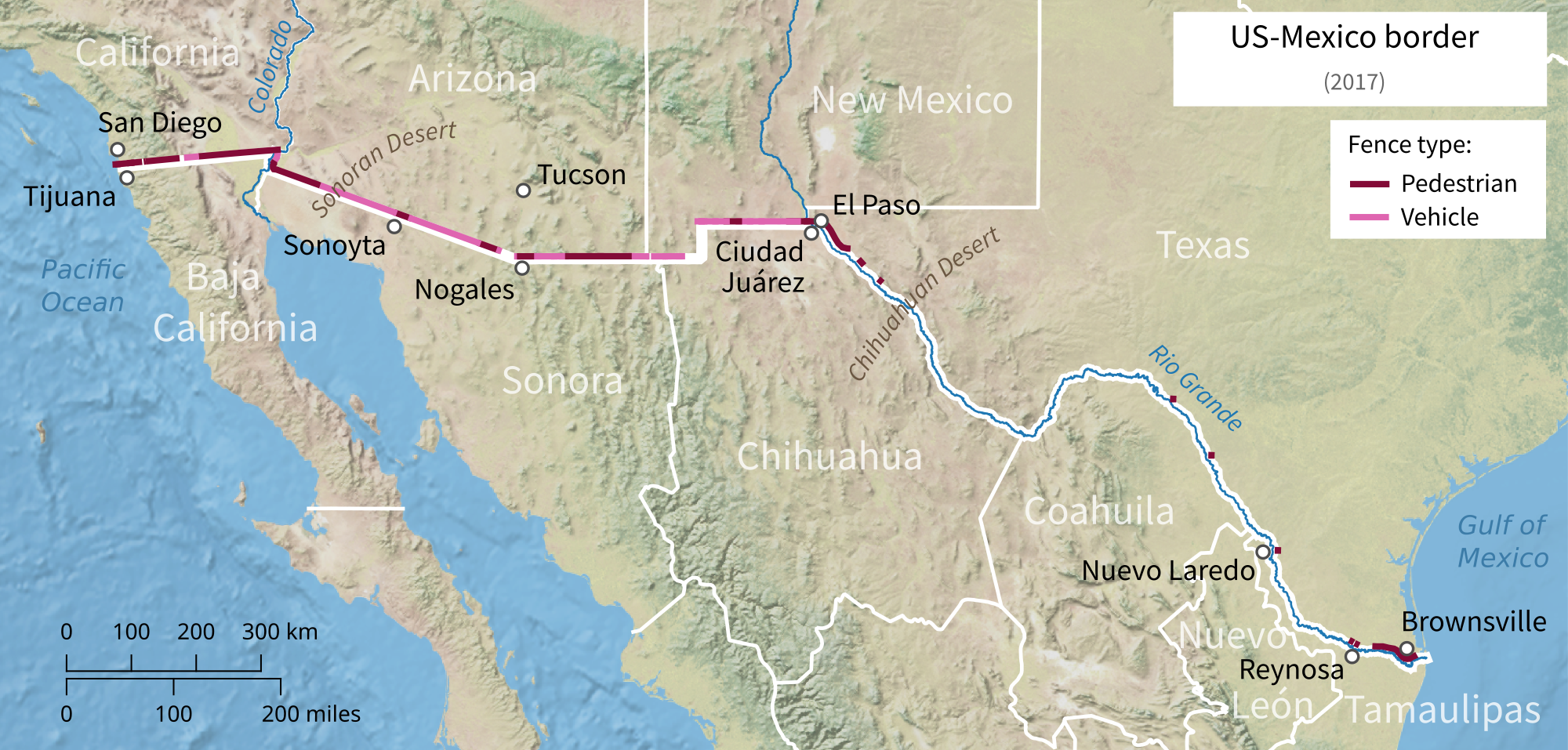
Border wall construction as of 2017

In the 1990s during the administration of American President George W. Bush, 14 miles of border wall were constructed near San Diego, California. The Illegal Immigration Reform and Immigration Responsibility Act of 1996 additionally fortified that 14 mile stretch of wall as part of efforts to reduce illegal immigration. Other legislation, such as the Secure Fence Act, have expanded upon those initial 14 miles of wall. Further expansion of wall construction occurred with President Donald Trump's Executive Order: Border Security and Immigration Enforcement Improvements. In order to reduce the amount of drugs and human-trafficking instances and to crack down on immigration, the United States began militarizing the border. The war on drugs in the 1980s led to Border Patrol agents expanding their duties from immigration duties to drug enforcement, which included, at times, collaboration with the military.

=== Tribal nations' borders ===
Border of Tohono O'odham Nation Reservation in the United States. Fails to include Tohono O'odham communities in northern Mexico

Various Indigenous groups inhabited the modern region of the American-Mexican border for thousands of years before Europeans, and often had their own conflicts over territory and resources. The Apache and Navajo, in particular, were aggressively expansionist and displaced a number of other Indigenous groups. The Kickapoo were lived in what is now Ohio at the time of contact with Europeans, and migrated south and west eventually settling in and around the US-Mexico border. the border region of what is now the Several nations, regardless of when they established themselves in the region, had sacred lands, resources, and members that extended beyond the border created after the Mexican-American War and the Gadsden Purchase, and with the creation of such a border also came the creation of citizenship which led to the restriction of free travel, jurisdictional issues, and a plethora of other issues. For instance, a tribal nation that spans the border might offer citizenship to all people regardless of location, but the states in which they exist may not recognize them as citizens of their locale. This citizenship issue particularly along the United States and Mexico border has many implications including limiting travel amongst members of a tribal nations and providing resources and services to a fragment of the tribal population.

Tribal nations that span the border include:

- Apaches
- Cocopah / Cucapá
- Kickapoo / Kikapú
- Kumeyaay / Kumiai
- O'odham
- Pai
- Yaqui / Yoeme

Many of these tribes are units comprising multiple nations. For instance, the Kumeyaay nation is made up of thirteen reservations in the United States and four communities in Mexico.

==== Kumeyaay ====
The Kumeyaay initially were located along the Pacific coastline, but they were later forced inland towards present-day San Diego and occupied territory that would later span the United States and Mexico border. Kumeyaay initially responded to encounters with the Spaniards with violence, but after two of the Kumeyaay's raid attempts failed, they resorted to tolerance. However this short respite did not last long as Spanish missions began to interfere with the Kumeyaay peoples. Over the almost forty years (1768-1822) that missions were present in the Kumeyaay region, the relationship was characterized by intermittent violence and reshaping boundaries. In 1821, Mexican Independence did not bring peace between the new nation and the Kumeyaay people. It did however mark a change in relationship as the Kumeyaay successfully raided surrounding ranchos and left the San Diego mission town weakened by 1846. The Kumeyaay advances to the coast combined with Quechan resistance to the Colorado River, cut off land routes from Alta California to the rest of Mexico, further splitting Alta California from Mexico economically and unintentionally forming the formation of the state's southern border. In 1848, the Americans arrive to fight the Mexican American War; the Kumeyaay offered their assistance, but their services were declined. Although they were not allied with the Americans, the Kumeyaay people still took revenge against the Mexicans for wrongdoings towards the end of the war. The war between Mexico and the United States ended with the Treaty of Guadalupe Hidalgo, but it failed to include the Kumeyaay and other tribes in negotiations. Land disputes, violence, and territory loss lasted for many years after the Treaty of Guadalupe Hidalgo because of the massive influx of people participating in the California Gold Rush. The Kumeyaay, and more broadly American Indians, were subjected to legalized forced servitude for four months if an American Indian was unemployed. In 1851, the San Diego government required the Native Americans to pay taxes, and if not, their land may be confiscated. There were many legislative and political decisions made in an effort to obtain the territory of the Kumeyaay and other tribes.

==== Tohono O'odham ====
The Tohono O'odham people were historically established in the Papagueria region, which crosses present-day state lines and national borders. Similarly to the Kumeyaay peoples, the Tohono O'odham peoples were subjected to dealing with Spanish colonization, Mexican Independence, the Mexican-American War, and the Gadsden purchase. Spanish missionaries were present in the region, and helped protect the Tohono O'odham people from being subjected to forced servitudes. However, when Mexican Independence was achieved, this protection diminished and Mexicans encroached upon their territory and violence ensued, yet the violence lessened between the 1830s and 1850s. Mexicans also began to further encroach upon the Tohono O'odham territory, which increased tensions and hostilities, but these concerns were reduced with the Gadsden Purchase. For the next few decades, the tensions and violence shifted from colonists to the Apache, but when the United States did not honor the land rights, the United States government established reservations to end land disputes, which did not encompass their entire traditional territory. On the other hand, the Mexican government did not initially create a reservation, so the Mexican people continued to encroach upon Tohono O'odham lands, which in turn led to violence. Many of the Tohono O'odham fled to the United States, but a few remained in Mexico.

== Issues ==
=== Militarization of border ===
Border control has made it increasingly difficult for tribal nations whose territories extend across the border to travel freely. Racial profiling, requiring documentation, and fear have restricted free movement of Indigenous peoples to their counterparts across the border while also interrupting their daily practices and lives. A Supreme Court ruling upheld the precedent that "apparent Mexican ancestry" is reasonable suspicion to stop people near the United States and Mexico border. This contributed to an increase of racial profiling and stops of Native Americans. When an Indigenous individual is stopped and declares they are a member of a tribe, they often face further interrogation. In addition to racial profiling, documentation required to cross the border has led to numerous challenges. For instance, the Tohono O'odham people in Mexico and the United States are members of a binational tribe, and able to access tribal nation services like healthcare. However, the militarization of the United States border makes it very difficult for them to cross and visit family, participate in ceremonies, and access available resources and services. Whether they have to obtain specific documentation or drive hundreds of miles to an official point of entry, the Tohono O'odham are restricted from free travel within their territories. The Tohono O'odham nation are willing to cooperate and discuss methods that would help protect the United States border while also protecting their members in northern Mexico. U.S. Border Control has at times refused to accept traditional tribal identification and not only restricted access to their counterparts across the border but also undermined tribal sovereignty. This necessity for proper documentation and specific ports of entry stemmed from hyper-fear of illegal immigrants as well as the "Drug War"; tribal nations are working with the United States government to create systems for crossing the border that work for both the tribal nation and the United States, such as enhanced technological security measure with tribal IDs that would be approved at ports of entry, but most legislative attempts by the United States Congress have not been enacted into law. In 1998, the Tohono O'odham Nation pursued legal means to ensure free passage through gates on traditional lands, which failed to pass in the United States Congress. In the mid 2010s, the Tohono O'odham Nation and the Pascua Yaqui tribe formed agreements with Homeland Security regarding the enhanced tribal ID cards. However, the consequences of militarizing the United States and Mexico border still have effects that are felt in Indigenous communities.

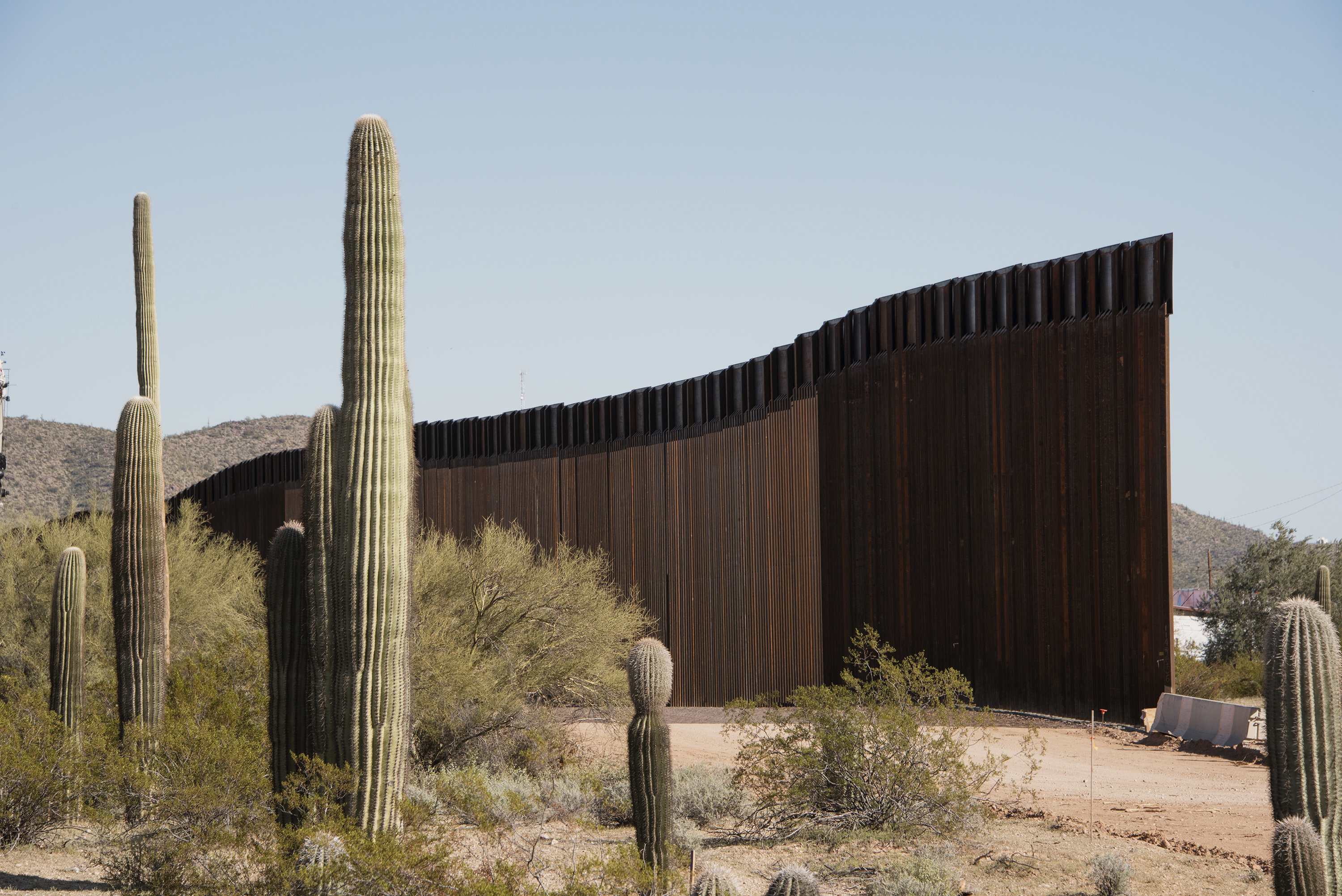
border wall near Ajo, Arizona between United States and Mexico.

=== Border wall ===
The physical border wall is alleged to have violated acts as it has interrupted the lives of Indigenous peoples that exist along the United States and Mexico border. A frequent issue that arises with the building of a wall or fence is the destruction of Indigenous lands. The border wall is argued to violate, in certain instances, the American Indian Religious Freedom Act as it restricts access to elders and sacred sites to practice their religion. For example, the physical border wall that was built between the Tohono O'odham territories was constructed through two burial sites in the Organ Pipe Cactus National Monument and is also interrupted efforts at preserving cultural traditions.

=== Environment ===
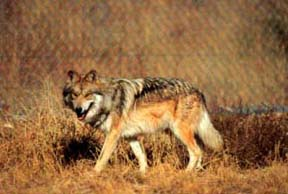
A Mexican Gray Wolf

There are several environmental concerns that come with the construction of the border wall along the United States and Mexico border. One such impact is the threat to the wildlife, particularly endangered species. More specifically, it disrupts their migration patterns, roaming territory, water access, and more. For endangered species, like the Mexican gray wolf and the Sonoran pronghorn, it is proposed the border wall may fragment their habitat and make reestablishing their populations near impossible. Also by disrupting migration patterns, a border wall is argued to impact the distribution and fertilization of seeds, and to possibly violate 30 federal environmental laws.

== Notable protests ==
=== Tohono O'odham ===
The Tohono O'odham people have been protesting the building of the border wall as it affects their sacred lands. The Tohono O'odham have historically been in opposition to the construction of a physical wall. The Tohono O'odham Nation Legislative Council has passed several resolutions reiterating the Nation's opposition. They have helped in efforts in securing the border such as extensive vehicle barriers, in 2007–2008, and CBP highway checkpoints. In early 2020, the Tohono O'odham tribal leaders approved the construction of integrated fixed tower that would have advanced technology in an effort to secure the border virtually. Some members of the tribal legislative council hoped that such towers would reduce the foot traffic of Border Control agents. However, these towers have sparked conflict within the tribal nation, as some are concerned that allowing the integrated fixed towers is only the beginning.

The protests in September and October 2020 became violent. While protesting the destruction of a part of Organ Pipe Cactus National Monument, a group of protesters set up a camp. They were asked to leave by National Park Service officers, and after ignoring warnings to leave the site, force was used. Border Patrol agents and park rangers pushed and shoved protesters; other officers threatened the use of paintball guns to disperse the crowd. The protesters were ultimately removed from the construction site, and no one was arrested. The same cannot be said for a similar protest. Protesting in the same Organ Pipe Cactus National Monument region, two women were arrested, but they were able to temporarily halt construction of the wall. One woman sat inside a construction vehicle while the other blocked traffic. Both women face misdemeanor charges. Similarly, on Indigenous Peoples' Day 2020, 12 people were arrested after protesters blocked the highway and refused to leave. Taking place near an immigration checkpoint on State Route 85, troopers fired tear gas, smoke canisters, and rubber bullets and used physical force, such as kneeling. This protest was also in response to the destruction of sacred lands brought forth by the wall, and the chairman of Tohono O'odham Nation, Ned Norris Junior, released a statement expressing his grievances and asking for a cease in construction of the wall.

=== Kumeyaay ===
The proposed border wall cuts through a sacred and ancient burial site of the Kumeyaay nation. The tribe, in August, filed a lawsuit against the Trump Administration citing the importance of the site and the discovery of human remains. According to the U.S. Customs and Border Protection stated that the "remains" were construction materials while the San Diego medical examiner confirmed the sample was human. The construction moved forward citing the remains were outside of the construction zone. Before and after August, the Kumeyaay have had success temporarily halting construction. On September 21, 2020, two individuals were arrested after refusing to leave the campsite, which had been an active protest camp for months, when the Bureau of Land Management issued a closure. Neither of the arrested individuals were charged with a crime. Similarly, an arrest was not made against a woman who yelled obscenities at and physically assaulted some of the peaceful protesters at the camp the protesters had established because no one had reported it or filed a complaint. As of October 18, 2020, the legal challenge to the construction of the Border Wall, filed by La Posta Band of Mission Indians, is in the Court of Appeals.
