= Pisinemo, Arizona =

CDP in Pima County, Arizona

Pisinemo, Arizona Pisin Moʼo (O'odham)
- CDP
- Location in Pima County and the state of Arizona

- Location in the United States
- Coordinates: 32°2′28″N 112°18′52″W
- Country: United States
- State: Arizona
- County: Pima
- Tribe: Tohono O'odham Nation

Area
  - Total: 2.27 sq mi (5.88 km^{2})
  - Land: 2.27 sq mi (5.88 km^{2})
  - Water: 0 sq mi (0.00 km^{2})
- Elevation: 1,890 ft (576 m)

Population (2020)
  - Total: 359
  - Density: 158/sq mi (61.1/km^{2})
- Time zone: UTC-7 (MST (no DST))
- ZIP code: 85634
- Area code: 520
- FIPS code: 04-56470
- GNIS feature ID: 1866991

Pisinemo (O'odham: Pisin Moʼo [pisinə moʔo], lit. 'Buffalo Head') is a census-designated place (CDP) in Pima County, Arizona, United States. The population was 340 as of the 2020 census.

== Geography ==
The village of Pisinemo is located at 32°2′28″N 112°18′52″W (32.041078, -112.314459).

The name Pisinemo is actually a failed attempt by the Motor Vehicle Division to put the traditional name of Pisin Mo'o onto roadside signs along Highway 86 which runs through the Tohono O'odham Nation. Pisin Mo'o is Tohono O'odham for "Buffalo Head".

According to the United States Census Bureau, the CDP has a total area of 1.7 square miles (4.4 km^{2}), all land.

== Demographics ==
Historical population
Census	Pop.	Note	%±
2020	359		—
U.S. Decennial Census

At the 2000 census there were 340 people, 85 households, and 61 families living in the CDP. The population density was 150 inhabitants per square mile (58/km^{2}). There were 122 housing units at an average density of 51.9 per square mile (20.0/km^{2}). The racial makeup of the CDP was 98% Native American and 2% White. 2% of the population were Hispanic or Latino of any race. Of the 70 households 36% had children under the age of 18 living with them, 23% were married couples living together, 31% had a female householder with no husband present, and 31% were non-families. 29% of households were one person and 9% were one person aged 65 or older. The average household size was 3.4 and the average family size was 4.1.

The age distribution was 34% under the age of 18, 13% from 18 to 24, 24% from 25 to 44, 22% from 45 to 64, and 7% 65 or older. The median age was 28 years. For every 100 females, there were 104.3 males. For every 100 females age 18 and over, there were 88.0 males.

The median household income was $17,826 and the median family income was $17,917. Males had a median income of $0 versus $28,750 for females. The per capita income for the CDP was $7,920. About 49% of families and 50% of the population were below the poverty line, including 46% of those under the age of eighteen and none of those sixty-five or over.

== Education ==
It is in the Indian Oasis-Baboquivari Unified School District.

== Notable people ==
- Gabriella Cázares-Kelly (born 1982), educator, community organizer, and politician
