= Gabriella Cázares-Kelly =

American educator (born 1982)

Pima County Recorder
- Incumbent
- Assumed office January 2021
- Preceded by: F. Ann Rodriguez

Personal details
- Born: 1982 (age 43–44)
- Citizenship: Tohono O'odham Nation; United States
- Party: Democratic
- Children: 2
- Education: Pima Community College; University of Arizona; Northern Arizona University

Gabriella Cázares-Kelly (born 1982) is a Tohono Oʼodham and American educator, community organizer, and politician serving as the Pima County, Arizona Recorder since 2021. She is the first Native American elected to a countywide role in Pima County.

== Early life and education ==
Cázares-Kelly was born in the Spring of 1982 and is a citizen of the Tohono O'odham Nation and comes from the Pisinemo District in Pisinemo, Arizona. She moved to Tucson, Arizona as a teenager. She completed general education at Pima Community College. Cázares-Kelly earned a bachelor's degree in secondary English education from the University of Arizona. She received a master's degree in educational leadership for community college and higher education from Northern Arizona University.

== Career ==
Cázares-Kelly began her career as a high school teacher on the Tohono O'odham Nation. She taught in high school and community college for over ten years. For over eight years, she was a member of the Arizona Academic Advising Articulation Task Force (AAAATF). She worked as an academic adviser at Tohono O'odham Community College before transitioning into voter registration efforts in 2016.

A community organizer, after the U.S. presidential election, Cázares-Kelly co-founded Indivisible Tohono in 2016 to address the lack of voter education and representation in her community. The group began organizing voter registration campaigns, training voter registrars, and hosting candidate forums to boost civic engagement. In January 2017, Cázares-Kelly spoke at the Tucson Women’s March, addressing the lack of inclusion of Indigenous women in the event. Her involvement continued into 2018, where she and other Indigenous women were disappointed with a similar event in Phoenix.

Under her leadership, Indivisible Tohono held the first-ever candidate forum on the Tohono O'odham Nation in August 2018. During this period, she actively worked to counter the impact of restrictive voting laws, lack of polling locations, and bureaucratic obstacles that disproportionately affected Native American voters in Arizona. In January 2019, Cázares-Kelly and Indivisible Tohono took a leading role in the Tucson Women’s March. They organized an intertribal group to ensure Indigenous women were prominently represented at the front of the march. This effort was part of a broader mission to create space for Indigenous voices in public events and social movements. In March 2019, Cázares-Kelly was one of three women honored for her community service by the Arizona César E. Chávez Holiday Coalition at the sixth annual Dolores Huerta Celebración de la Mujer.

In November 2019, Cázares-Kelly announced her candidacy for Pima County Recorder. She won the election in November 2020, becoming the first Native American elected to a countywide role in Pima County. She received 289,932 votes versus Republican Benny White who garnered 203,631. Cázares-Kelly began her term in January 2021, succeeding F. Ann Rodriguez. Her campaign focused on voter registration and ensuring that historically underrepresented communities in Pima County had a voice in elections. She focused on addressing barriers faced by Indigenous and rural voters, including lack of physical addresses and mistrust of government systems. Her initiatives have aimed to increase voter turnout by improving education and accessibility for marginalized communities.

Cázares-Kelly advocates for voting rights, emphasizing the need for non-partisan election processes. She has worked to eliminate obstacles for Native voters, including physical and legislative barriers. Although elected as a Democrat, she highlights the importance of trust in the electoral system across all political lines. As of December 2020, Cázares-Kelly is the vice-chair of the Native American Democratic Caucus and the president of the Progressive Democrats of Southern Arizona. She endorsed the Kamala Harris 2024 presidential campaign.

== Personal life ==
As of December 2020, Cázares-Kelly lives in Tucson with her husband and twin children.

== See also ==
- List of Native American politicians
- Native American women in politics
