= Chona (surname) =

Chona is a surname. Notable people with the surname include:

- Mainza Chona (1930–2001), Zambian diplomat and politician
- Maria Chona (1845–1936), Native American weaver and anthropological study participant
- Shayama Chona (born 1942), Indian educator and disability rights activist
