= Tohono O'Odham Ki:Ki Association =

Tribally designated housing entity

The Tohono O'odham Ki:Ki Association (Tohono O'odham Housing Authority), formerly known as the Papago Housing Authority, is the tribally designated housing entity of the Tohono O'odham Nation of Arizona, enacted by Resolution of the Tohono O'odham Legislative Council No. 98-03.

The Tohono O'odham Ki:Ki Association (TOKA) is the recipient of the Indian Community Development Block Grant (ICDBG) by the United States Department of Housing and Urban Development. This entitles the TOKA to $2.75 million to be utilized for the replacement and rebuilding of vacant and abandoned homes throughout the Nation.

The purpose of the TOKA is to provide low-income and affordable housing services to the membership of the Tohono O'odham Nation. The TOKA is overseen by a five-person Board of Directors, who are appointed by the Tohono O'odham Nation Legislative Council. The programs daily operations are overseen by an Executive Director who is appointed by the Board of Directors. There are eight departments within the program: Administration, Human Resources/Information Technology, Residential Services, Finance, Compliance, Development, Construction, and Maintenance. The association hires from 50 to 90 individuals.

The organization's Mission Statement is as follows:

The Tohono O'odham Nation will promote and develop affordable quality housing opportunities in a safe and healthy environment; promote and establish homeownership opportunities; operate the housing program in efficient and effective manner; improve and strengthen relations with residents; and promote partnerships with community and private sector for private mortgage capital financing to maximize housing opportunities for all eligible Tohono O'odham tribal members.

The program services over 800 homes which were built utilizing funding by the United States Department of Housing and Urban Development. The Tohono O'odham Ki:Ki Association headquarters are located on the Tohono O'odham Nation in the town of Sells, Arizona.

Pete Delgado is the current Executive Director.
