= Ruth Underhill =

American anthropologist (1883–1984)

Ruth Murray Underhill
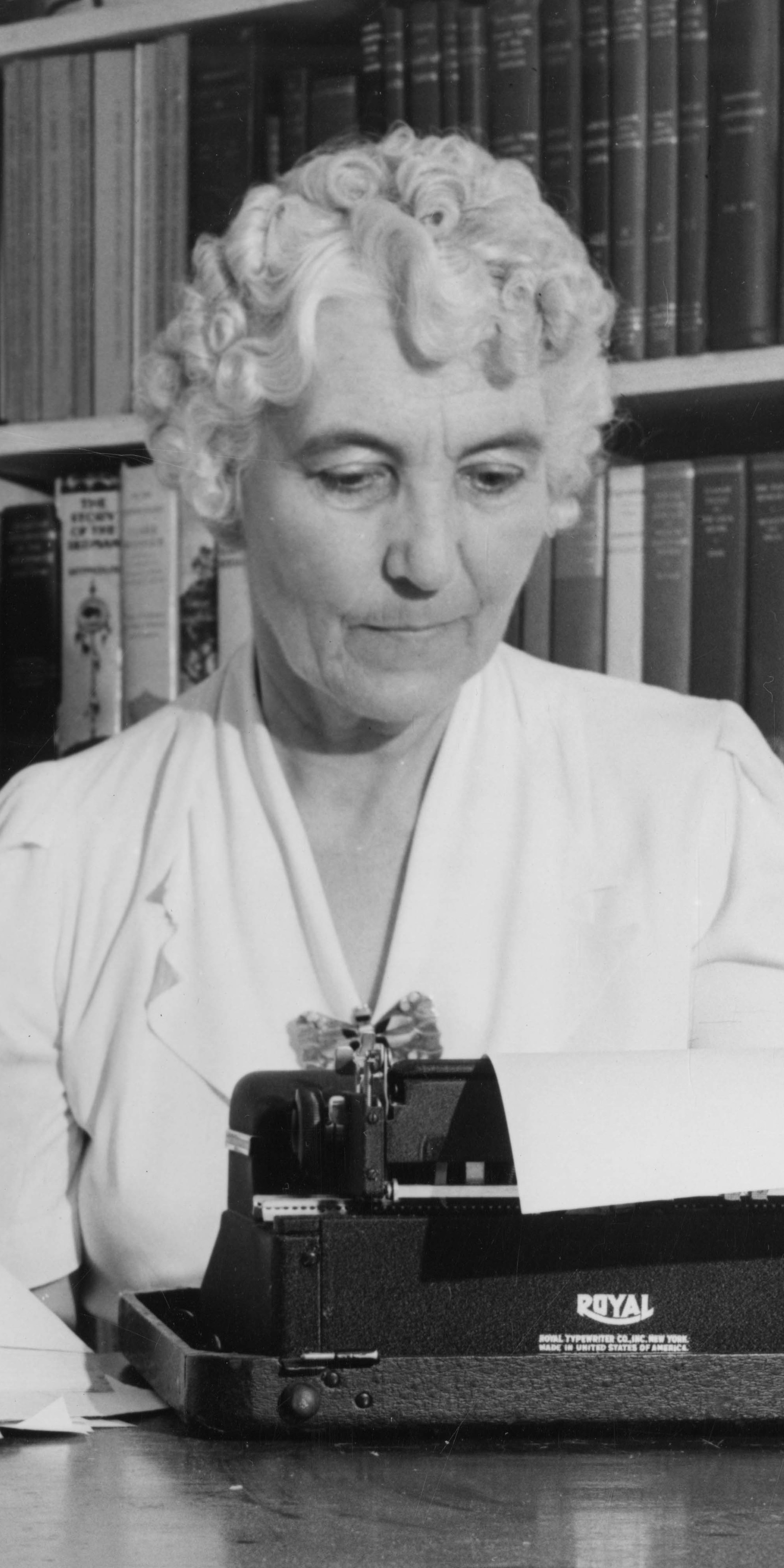
- Ruth Underhill photographed in June 1941
- Born: August 22, 1883; Ossining-on-the-Hudson, New York
- Died: August 15, 1984 (aged 100); Denver, Colorado
- Education: Ph.D. in anthropology, Columbia University (1937)
- Occupation: Anthropologist
- Spouse: Charles C. Crawford (divorced in 1929)
- Parent(s): Abram (Abraham) Underhill and Anna Taber Murray

Ruth Murray Underhill (August 22, 1883 – August 15, 1984) was an American anthropologist. She was born in Ossining-on-the-Hudson, New York, and attended Vassar College, graduating in 1905 with a degree in Language and Literature. In 1907, she graduated from the London School of Economics and began travelling throughout Europe. During World War I, she worked for an Italian orphanage run by the Red Cross.

After the war, she married Charles C. Crawford and published her first book The White Moth. Her marriage ended in 1929, and by 1930, she decided to go back to school to learn more about human behavior. After speaking with Franz Boas and Ruth Benedict in the Anthropology Department at Columbia University, she decided to pursue the field, graduating with a doctorate in 1937. She wrote numerous books on Native American tribes and helped to dispel many myths about their cultures.

== Life and family ==
Underhill was born in Ossining, New York, on August 22, 1883, to Abram Sutton Underhill, a lawyer, and mother Anna Taber Murray Underhill. There has been some discussion among historians about her year of birth, but both a copy of her birth certificate and early census records indicate that she was born in this year rather than 1884. The oldest of four children, she had two sisters and a brother. Her sister Elizabeth was a suffragist, law school graduate and one of the first female bank directors, while her brother Robert was a professor at Harvard and mountaineer. Like her brother, she enjoyed mountain climbing as a hobby. The family were brought up as Quakers.

In 1919, Ruth Underhill married Charles Cecil Crawford and they had 2 children and they divorced amicably in 1929. She died in Denver, Colorado, on August 15, 1984, at age 100.

== Education ==
Ruth grew up attending Ossining School for Girls. She attended a Bryn Mawr College preparatory school before instead entering Vassar College in 1901. She studied English and languages, receiving her A.B. with honors and was elected to Phi Beta Kappa in 1905. After graduation she went on to travel in Europe and study languages and social sciences at London School of Economics and the Ludwig-Maximilians-Universität München. She became fluent in German, French, Italian, and Spanish.

Underhill decided to go back to school after her divorce at age 46. She later described her entry into Columbia University as "a search for something she could do to help humanity." After wandering from department to department taking classes in economics, sociology, and philosophy she eventually found herself in encouraged to pursue anthropology by Ruth Benedict. The anthropology department head, Franz Boaz provided funds for her to study the Tohono O’odham in Arizona (at the time called Papago Indians). She also received research funding from the Columbia University Social Science and Humanities Council. Her Ph.D. dissertation, Social Organization of the Papago Indians, was published in 1937.

== Careers ==
=== Social Worker ===
In 1905, Underhill taught Latin at a boys’ school. She then took a social worker position with the Massachusetts Society for the Prevention of Cruelty to Children working with Italian cases. Toward the end of World War I she was employed as a social worker with the American Red Cross, Committee for Crippled and Disabled and was transferred to Civilian Relief to take charge of establishing orphanages in Italy in the summer of 1919. After the war she investigated child labor in Italy for the Rockefeller Foundation before returning to New York.

=== Writer ===
Also after Vasser, Underhill began to write for newspapers and magazines. In 1920, her first novel The White Moth, was published. One of her most popular books was Red Man's America, originally published in 1953. In 1956, KRMA-TV produced a series of 30 documentary films, which were adapted from the book and shared its title. Each film focused on a specific region in North America and examined the native peoples and their cultures of that region.

=== Anthropologist ===
Graduate school led her to conduct one of the earliest scientific studies of the Tohono O’odham of Arizona, a work that would establish Underhill in the profession. Because of her age, the Tohono O'odham allowed her to live with them for several summers. During this time, she could study the women closely. She later wrote a book titled Autobiography of a Papago Woman, which chronicled the life of Maria Chona, an elderly member of the Tohono O'odham Nation.

=== Government Worker ===
After graduating from Columbia, Underfill first worked with the U.S. Department of Agriculture Soil Conservation Service and then the Bureau of Indian Affairs. She served as Assistant Supervisor of Indian Education from 1934 to 1942 in Santa Fe, New Mexico, then Supervisor from 1942 to 1948 in Denver, Colorado. In this role she traveled extensively and worked with reservation teachers to develop curriculum for Indian Schools that included Native American culture. She also assisted in negotiations between the BIA and Native American groups.

=== Retirement and teaching ===
With her government position in jeopardy after post-World War II reorganization in the BIA, Underhill held a series of visiting positions until retirement in October 1948. In 1949, Underhill accepted a position as Professor of Anthropology with the University of Denver and held the position for four years. In her second retirement, Underhill spent much of her time traveling the world and writing. She also taught at New York State Teachers College in New Paltz and Colorado Women's College. According to her oral histories, she stayed three months at a time in Israel and India. Beginning in the 1970s, the Denver Museum of Nature and Science began working with Underhill to capture her own history through audio and video recordings.

== Honors and awards ==
In 1979, Underhill was honored by the Tohono O'odham Nation, for her work in preserving their past. She was also honored by the Gila River Reservation O'odhams in 1980. On October 28, 1981, she was presented with an award from the Colorado River Indian Tribes for her sincere, devoted and untiring effort in the gathering of information about their culture. In addition, she received a Friendship Award from the White Buffalo Council of American Indians.

She received an honorary Doctor of Laws from the University of Denver in 1962 and honorary Doctor of Science degree from University of Colorado in 1965. In 1983 on her 100th birthday, Colorado Governor Richard Lamm declared August 22 as Ruth Underhill Day. In June 1984, the American Anthropological Association presented Underhill with a Special Recognition for her teaching and research, including efforts to popularize anthropology and study the roles of women. In 1985 The Denver Women's Press Club established a scholarship in Underhill's honor; this award is given to a University of Colorado student for accomplishment in creative writing.

== Published works ==
- "Victory in Olive-Gray" The Atlantic Monthly Vol. 124, 1919, pp. 62. (Article)
- The White Moth (novel), 1920
- Ethnobiology of the Papago Indians, with Edward Castetter, University of New Mexico Bulletin #275, 1935
- Autobiography of a Papago Woman, 1936

(Originally published as Memoir 46 of the American Anthropological Association)

- Social Organization of the Papago Indians, 1937
- Singing for Power, 1938
- First Penthouse Dwellers of America, 1938
- A Papago Calendar Record, University of New Mexico, 1938
- Social Organization of the Papago Indians, Columbia University Press, 1939
- Hawk Over Whirlpools (fiction), 1940
- The Papago Indians of Arizona and their Relatives the Pima, 1941
- "Papago Child Training," Marriage and Family Living, Nov. 1942
- Pueblo Crafts, United States Indian Service, 1946
- Papago Indian Religion, Columbia University Press, 1946
- Workaday Life in the Pueblos, 1946 (reprinted in 1991)
- Indians of the Pacific Northwest, 1946
- Ceremonial Patterns in the Greater Southwest, 1948
- Red Man's America, 1953
- Here Come the Navajo!, circa 1934–1947
- The Navajos, 1956
- Religion Among American Indians, 1957
- Beaverbird (fiction), 1959
- Antelope Singer (fiction), 1961
- Withdrawal as a Means of Dealing with the Supernatural, 1961
- Red Man's Religion: Beliefs and Practices of the Indians North of Mexico, 1965
- "The Papago Family," in Comparative Family Systems, 1965
- First Came the Family, 1967
- So Many Kinds of Navajo, 1971
- The Papago and Pima Indians of Arizona, 1979 (ISBN 0-910584-52-4)

(reprint of The Papago Indians of Arizona and their Relatives the Pima, 1941)

- Religious Practices of the Papago Indians, unknown publication date

== Archive collections ==
- Papers of Ruth M. Underhill - Bailey Library and Archives, Denver Museum of Nature and Science
- Ruth Underhill Papers (M060) - Special Collections and Archives, Penrose Library, University of Denver
- Oral history interview with Underhill, Ruth Murray - Western History/Genealogy Dept., Denver Public Library
- Ruth Murray Underhill Papers (Ax 570) - Special Collections & University Archives, University of Oregon Libraries
