= Tohono Oʼodham High School =

Location
- Mile Marker 75, Highway 86; Wahak Hotrontk, Arizona 85634; United States
- 32°11′16″N 112°24′21″W

Information
- School type: Public high school through the Bureau of Indian Education
- Established: Mid-1980s
- School district: Arizona South
- CEEB code: 030419
- Principal: Dr. Otis Clarke
- Grades: 9-12
- Enrollment: 115 (2023–2024)
- Colors: Maroon and gold
- Mascot: Eagles

The Tohono Oʼodham High School is a high school in unincorporated Pima County, Arizona, in the Tohono Oʼodham Indian Reservation. Located along Arizona State Route 86 (mile marker 74), near Sells, it is operated directly by the Bureau of Indian Education. Feeder schools include the San Simon day school and the Santa Rosa Boarding School, also operated by the BIA. It was established in the mid-1980s as the remaining reservations in Arizona finally received their own high schools.

The public district schools in the area are operated by Baboquivari Unified School District.
