= Sells, Arizona =

CDP in Pima County, Arizona

Sells, Arizona O'odham: Komkcʼeḍ ʼe-Wa:ʼosidk
- Census designated place
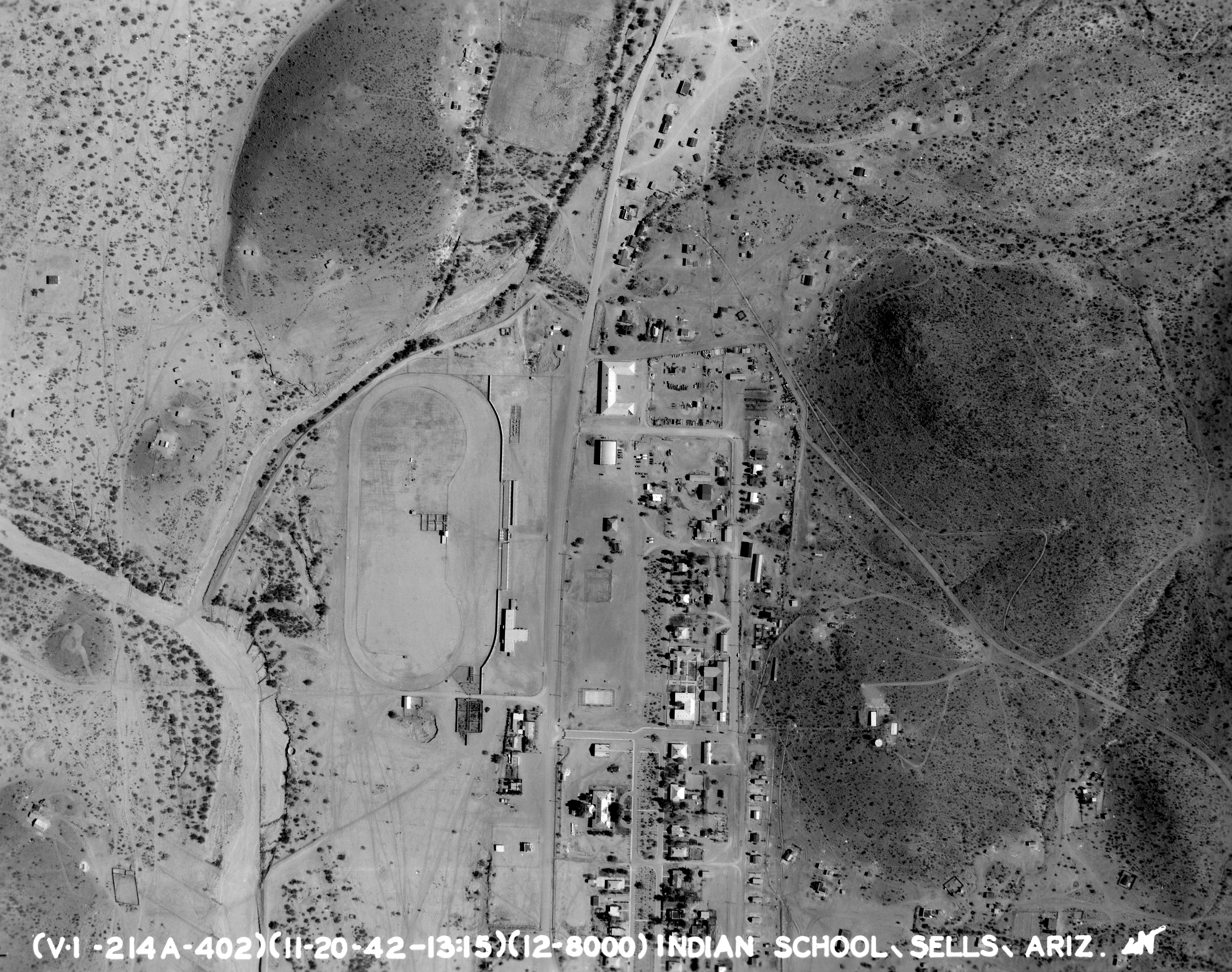
- Sells Indian School, 1940s

- Location in Pima County and the state of Arizona

- Location in the United States Sells (the United States)
- Coordinates: 31°54′46″N 111°52′31″W
- Country: United States
- State: Arizona
- County: Pima
- Tribe: Tohono O'odham Nation

Area
  - Total: 9.24 sq mi (23.94 km^{2})
  - Land: 9.24 sq mi (23.92 km^{2})
  - Water: 0.0077 sq mi (0.02 km^{2})
- Elevation: 2,392 ft (729 m)

Population (2020)
  - Total: 2,121
  - Density: 229.7/sq mi (88.68/km^{2})
- Time zone: UTC-7 (MST (no DST))
- ZIP code: 85634
- Area code: 520
- FIPS code: 04-65490
- GNIS feature ID: 11073

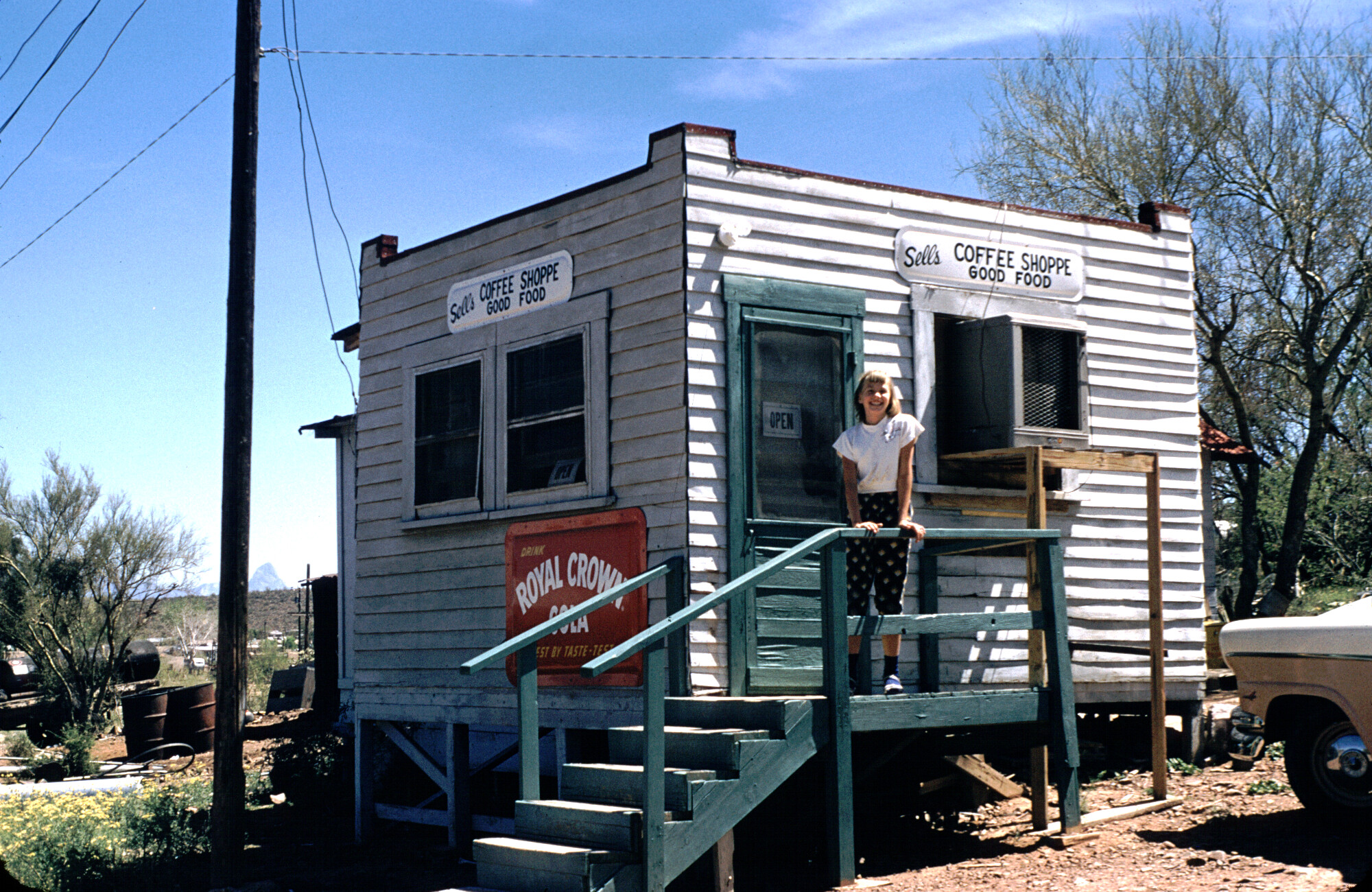
Coffee shop in Sells

Sells (O'odham: Komkcʼeḍ ʼe-Wa:ʼosidk) is an unincorporated community and census-designated place (CDP) in Pima County, Arizona, United States. The population was 2,799 at the 2000 census. It is the capital of the Tohono O'odham Nation and the home of several tribal businesses, such as Tohono O'Odham Ki:Ki Association. It was originally named Indian Oasis by cattle-ranchers/businessmen brothers Joseph and Louis Ménager in 1912. The Ménager brothers also built and ran the Indian Oasis Mercantile Store. The settlement took its present English name in 1918 to honor Indian Commissioner Cato Sells. The O'odham name means "tortoise got wedged".

Sells is near the Kitt Peak National Observatory.

== Geography ==
Sells is located at 31°54′54″N 111°52′32″W (31.914994, -111.875669).

According to the United States Census Bureau, the CDP has a total area of 9.4 square miles (24 km^{2}), of which 9.4 square miles (24 km^{2}) is land and 0.11% is water.

== Demographics ==
Historical population
Census	Pop.	Note	%±
2020	2,121		—
U.S. Decennial Census

=== 2020 census ===
As of the 2020 census, Sells had a population of 2,121. The median age was 30.2 years. 31.5% of residents were under the age of 18 and 10.0% of residents were 65 years of age or older. For every 100 females there were 93.0 males, and for every 100 females age 18 and over there were 91.6 males age 18 and over.

0.0% of residents lived in urban areas, while 100.0% lived in rural areas.

There were 591 households in Sells, of which 41.5% had children under the age of 18 living in them. Of all households, 18.3% were married-couple households, 24.2% were households with a male householder and no spouse or partner present, and 46.2% were households with a female householder and no spouse or partner present. About 25.9% of all households were made up of individuals and 9.8% had someone living alone who was 65 years of age or older.

There were 675 housing units, of which 12.4% were vacant. The homeowner vacancy rate was 0.0% and the rental vacancy rate was 2.2%.

Racial composition as of the 2020 census
Race	Number	Percent
White	29	1.4%
Black or African American	2	0.1%
American Indian and Alaska Native	2,052	96.7%
Asian	0	0.0%
Native Hawaiian and Other Pacific Islander	0	0.0%
Some other race	7	0.3%
Two or more races	31	1.5%
Hispanic or Latino (of any race)	112	5.3%

=== 2000 census ===
As of the 2000 census, there were 2,799 people, 690 households, and 565 families residing in the CDP. The population density was 298.9 inhabitants per square mile (115.4/km^{2}). There were 810 housing units at an average density of 86.5 per square mile (33.4/km^{2}). The racial makeup of the CDP was 96% Native American, 3% White, <1% Black or African American, <1% Asian, <1% from other races, and <1% from two or more races. 3% of the population were Hispanic or Latino of any race.

There were 690 households, out of which 42.3% had children under the age of 18 living with them, 26% were married couples living together, 44% had a female householder with no husband present, and 18% were non-families. 14% of all households were made up of individuals, and 2% had someone living alone who was 65 years of age or older. The average household size was 4.0 and the average family size was 4.3.

In the CDP, the population was spread out, with 42% under the age of 18, 11% from 18 to 24, 27% from 25 to 44, 16% from 45 to 64, and 5% who were 65 years of age or older. The median age was 23 years. For every 100 females, there were 93.3 males. For every 100 females age 18 and over, there were 82.2 males.

The median income for a household in the CDP was $20,610, and the median income for a family was $20,294. Males had a median income of $25,278 versus $22,396 for females. The per capita income for the CDP was $6,283. About 42% of families and 46% of the population were below the poverty line, including 51% of those under age 18 and 41% of those age 65 or over.

== Education ==
Baboquivari Unified School District operates area public schools, while Tohono O'odham High School is a Bureau of Indian Affairs high school.
