= Vamori, Arizona =

- Populated place
- Location within the state of Arizona Vamori (the United States)
- Coordinates: 31°43′16″N 111°54′19″W
- Country: United States
- State: Arizona
- County: Pima
- Tribe: Tohono O'odham Nation
- Elevation: 2,251 ft (686 m)
- Time zone: UTC-7 (Mountain (MST))
  - Summer (DST): UTC-7 (MST)
- Area code: 520
- FIPS code: 04-79170
- GNIS feature ID: 13182

Vamori is a populated place situated in Pima County, Arizona, United States. It has an estimated elevation of 2,251 feet (686 m) above sea level.
