= Cato Sells =

American government official

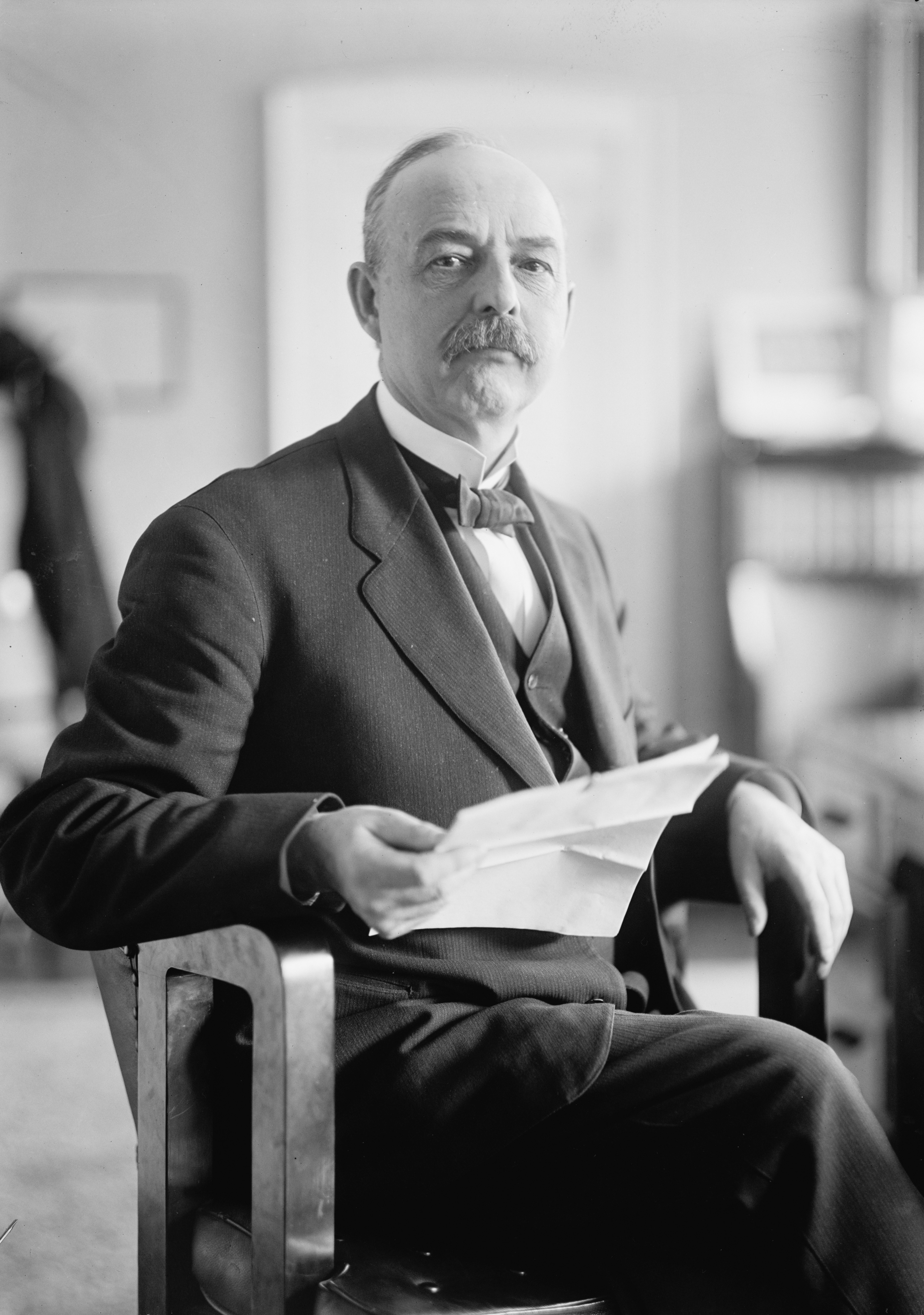
- Cato Sells, 1914

34th Commissioner of Indian Affairs
- In office 1913–1921
- President: Woodrow Wilson
- Preceded by: Robert G. Valentine
- Succeeded by: Charles H. Burke

Personal details
- Born: October 6, 1859. Vinton, Iowa
- Died: December 30, 1948 (aged 89) Fort Worth, Texas
- Known for: Namesake of the town of Sells, Arizona

Cato Sells (October 6, 1859 – December 30, 1948) was a commissioner at the Bureau of Indian Affairs from 1913 to 1921.

== Life and career ==
He was born in Vinton, Iowa, on October 6, 1859. He lost his father when he was young. He entered Cornell College in 1875. In 1878 he read law with Charles Alvord Bishop and in 1880 was admitted to Iowa State Bar Association and began practice at La Porte City, Iowa.

In 1889 he moved to Vinton, Iowa, and served on the Iowa State Central Committee. In 1887 he was chairman of the committee and was a delegate to the 1888 Democratic National Convention. He was a delegate to the 1892 Democratic National Convention as secretary. In 1892 was he was elected as a trustee of the Iowa State College of Agriculture. In 1893 he was president of the Iowa Democratic State Convention.

In 1894 he was appointed by Grover Cleveland as United States Attorney for the United States District Court for the Northern District of Iowa. In 1899 he was again president of the Iowa Democratic State Convention and in 1900 chairman of the Iowa delegation in the 1900 Democratic National Convention in Kansas City.

He was a commissioner at the Bureau of Indian Affairs from 1913 from 1921. In 1914 he banished books that taught anything concerning the Asian origins of Indigenous peoples of the Americas.

He died October 30, 1948, and was buried in the Cleburne Memorial Cemetery in Cleburne, Texas.

== Legacy ==
Sells is the namesake of the town of Sells, Arizona.
