= Gu Achi Peak =

Landform in Pima County, Arizona

- Location within Arizona

Highest point
- Elevation: 4,558 ft (1,389 m) NAVD 88
- Prominence: 2,636 ft (803 m)
- Coordinates: 32°20′51″N 111°52′35″W

Geography
- Location: Pima County, Arizona, U.S.
- Parent range: Santa Rosa Mountains
- Topo map: USGS Santa Rosa Mountains

Gu Achi Peak (O'odham: Ge Aji Doʼag) is a mountain in the Santa Rosa Mountains of Arizona. It is on the Tohono O'odham Indian Reservation, about 56 miles (90 km) west of Tucson. Gu Achi Peak can be translated as "big ridge." In precolonial times it was the central territory of the Totokwan group of the O'odham, and it may have served as the ceremonial center for the northern O'odham groups.

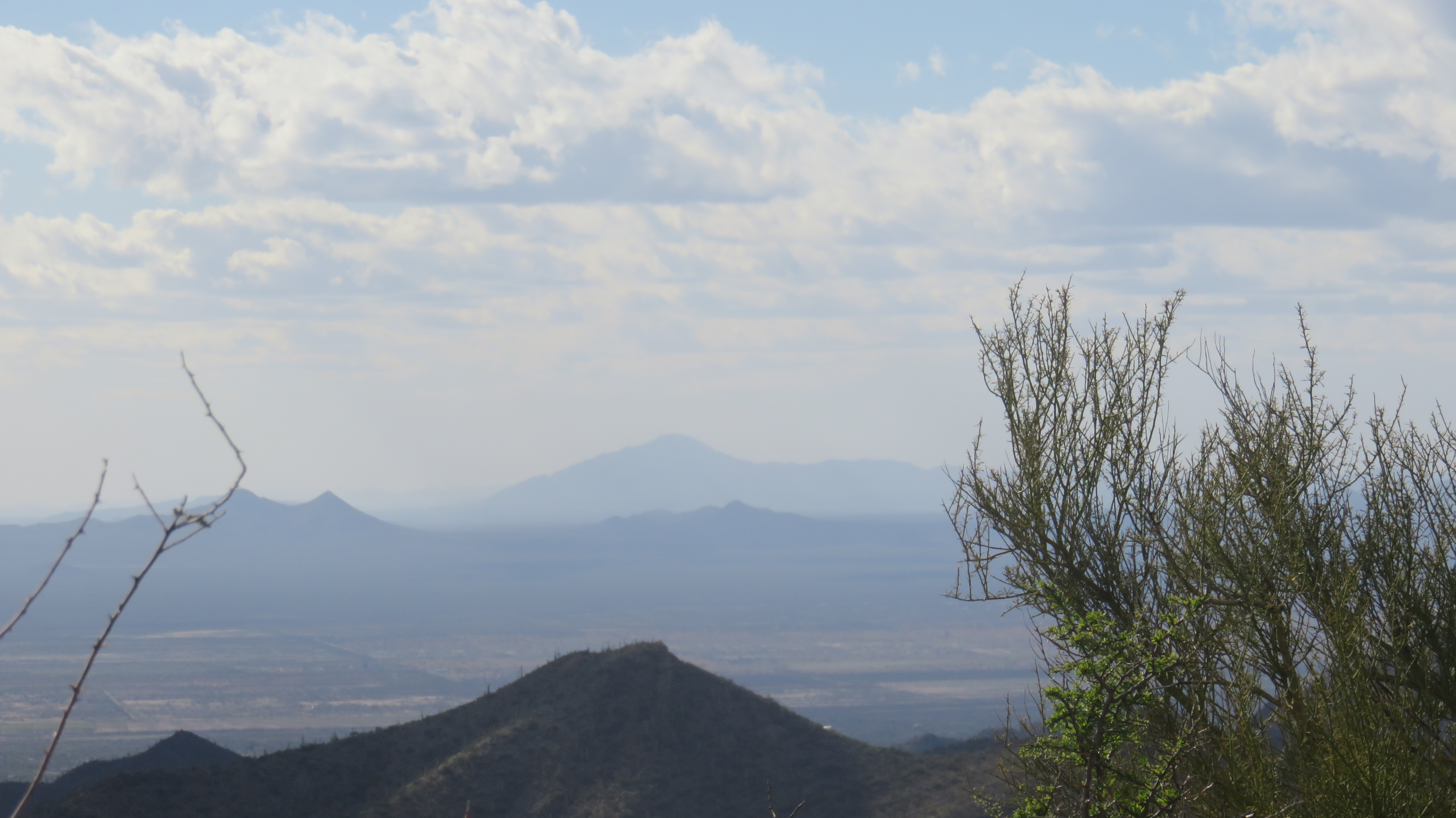
Gu Achi Peak viewed from the east, 45 miles away in the Tucson Mountains
