= Tucson Indian School =

American Indian boarding school in Arizona, U.S.

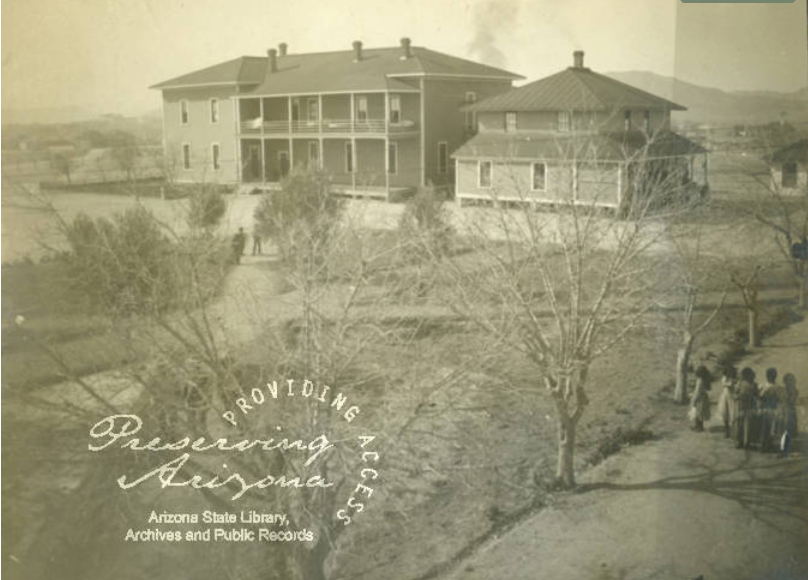
Photo of Tucson Indian School Campus in 1925

Tucson Indian school was founded by the United States federal government in 1888 to assimilate Native American children of the Akimel O'odham and Tohono Oʼodham tribes from the area around what is now Tucson, Arizona into mainstream American society. The school was created under federal acts with the goal of indoctrinating Native American children into Western colonial society by separating them from their communities' culture and reeducating them in boarding schools. The school closed in 1960.

== History ==
The Civilization Fund Acts of 1819 were enacted to prevent conflict between American settlers and Native peoples through assimilative outreach programs to introduce the Native children to habits and culture of colonial civilization. President Grant's peace policy of 1869 allowed for the creation of federally funded Native American boarding schools and gave Christian religious groups jurisdiction over tribes to allow them to run Indian reservations on behalf of the tribe. The Presbyterian church took agency over the Akimel O'odham and Tohono Oʼodham tribes. In 1886 John B. Riley, the federal Indian school superintendent decided there was a need for a boarding school for the O'odham communities. The Presbyterian church then agreed to build and run a religious boarding school for the Native children of the Tucson area. The school was constructed on 15 acres of land on what is now the corner of 5th Street and Second Avenue in Tucson. The land was leased from the city of Tucson under a 99-year contract for a dollar a year. Two two-story buildings were constructed on the site along with smaller housing cottages. The main school building was made out of redwood and pine and contained two classrooms, a cafeteria, three teachers' rooms, and a dining room/teacher lounge. The second building was built out of adobe and acted as a kitchen, laundry, and storeroom. In 1888 the Philadelphia board of missionaries hired Mary Whittaker and Howard Billman to be the head teacher and superintendent of the new Indian school respectively.

During its first year, the school housed and taught 58 students, 31 boys and 27 girls. Half of the student population were members of the Akimel O'odham tribe and the other half of the student population were members of the Tohono O'odham tribe. Tuition for the students came from the US government, they agreed to $125 per student per year as long as the school continued to conform to government educational and health standards as well as ingrain Christian teachings and practices into their students.

During Billman's time as superintendent he focused on expanding the school facilities and manual career training. An additional brick building was constructed to serve as an additional dormitory space and classrooms. 42 acres of land adjacent to the school was purchased by the Presbyterian board of missions to serve as farmland for the school. A windmill, well, livestock shelters and storage barns were constructed on the farm site. Much of the construction of the new facilities was performed by teenage male students as a part of their school curriculum. Following an epidemic of scarlet fever and measles among the O'odham population, Billman secured funds and built a medical center on the school campus that serves the O'odham communities. After six years as superintendent Howard Billman facilitated the construction of several new buildings and expanded the farm operation to the point where the school could sell their crops for funding. Billman's expansion allowed the enrollment of a total of 175 students. The farm profits allowed for the school to become financially independent from the US government to the point where the Presbyterian board of missions could assume full financial responsibility of the school and thus ended its tuition funding contract with the US government. Expansion continued after Billman resigned as superintendent. By 1930 the school campus covered 160 acres with 9 buildings and 60 acres of irrigated farm land. The expansion and financial independence of the school allowed them to have students from tribes other than the O'odham peoples, and by 1940 the school enrolled students from over 18 different tribes.

== Strategies for assimilation in the school curriculum ==
The classes were held six hours a day, six days a week with a mandatory hour-long study period after dinner. Children took part in Presbyterian religious services on Sundays as well as Sunday school bible study. Children were taught school subjects in a classrooms for three hours and the other three hours of the school day were spent learning manual industrial training. The goal of the curriculum was to teach Native students skills and religion to allow them to assimilate into American society outside of their tribe. The Presbyterian church wanted the children to abandon their traditional cultural practices in favor of the cultural norms and roles in society enforced by Christian American settlers. They sought to have children disconnect with their Indigenous identity; some of the ways they forced this upon the students were giving students English names and cutting boys' long hair, which holds cultural significance in both Akimel O'odham and Tohono Oʼodham traditions since only men with long glossy hair were chosen to be dancers in ceremonies. The curriculum consisted of basic classroom subjects taught in all US schools such as English, geography, US history, and arithmetic. US patriotism was also taught to Native children by having them recite the pledge of allegiance every morning and practice singing the national anthem. The students were separated by sex for their industrial training classes. The boys were taught farming, construction, animal care, and blacksmithing, while the girls were taught cooking, sewing, and cleaning. Many of the boys disagreed with having to work on the farm because the planting and harvesting of crops is traditionally a woman's role in both Akimel O'odham and Tohono Oʼodhamo cultures. Older children were given unpaid jobs that helped run and improve the school, and as a result, much of the essential operations of the school were performed by students. Native boys assisted with and led the construction of many facilities on the Tucson Indian school campus. The students also sustained the school financially, all of the farming that provided the school with funding was performed by the boys attending the school. Some student who showed interest in the Presbyterian religion were trained to be missionaries to help the conversion of Native people to Christianity.

== School closure ==
School operations and enrollment began to decline in the 1950s as most Native students were living with their families and attending regular public schools at this time. Due to this, farm operations ceased in 1957 and the school was primarily used as housing for Native students attending Pueblo High School. Due to the high cost of tuition at Pueblo High School, the school closed in 1960. The school buildings were demolished in 1964 and the Santa Cruz Plaza shopping center was built on the land the school previously occupied.
