= Gila Bend Indian Reservation =

Tohono O'odham Nations reservation

Gila Bend Indian Reservation was one of three Tohono O'odham Nations 3 reservations, with this one being the smallest both geographically and demographically, with only 625 people on it.

== History ==
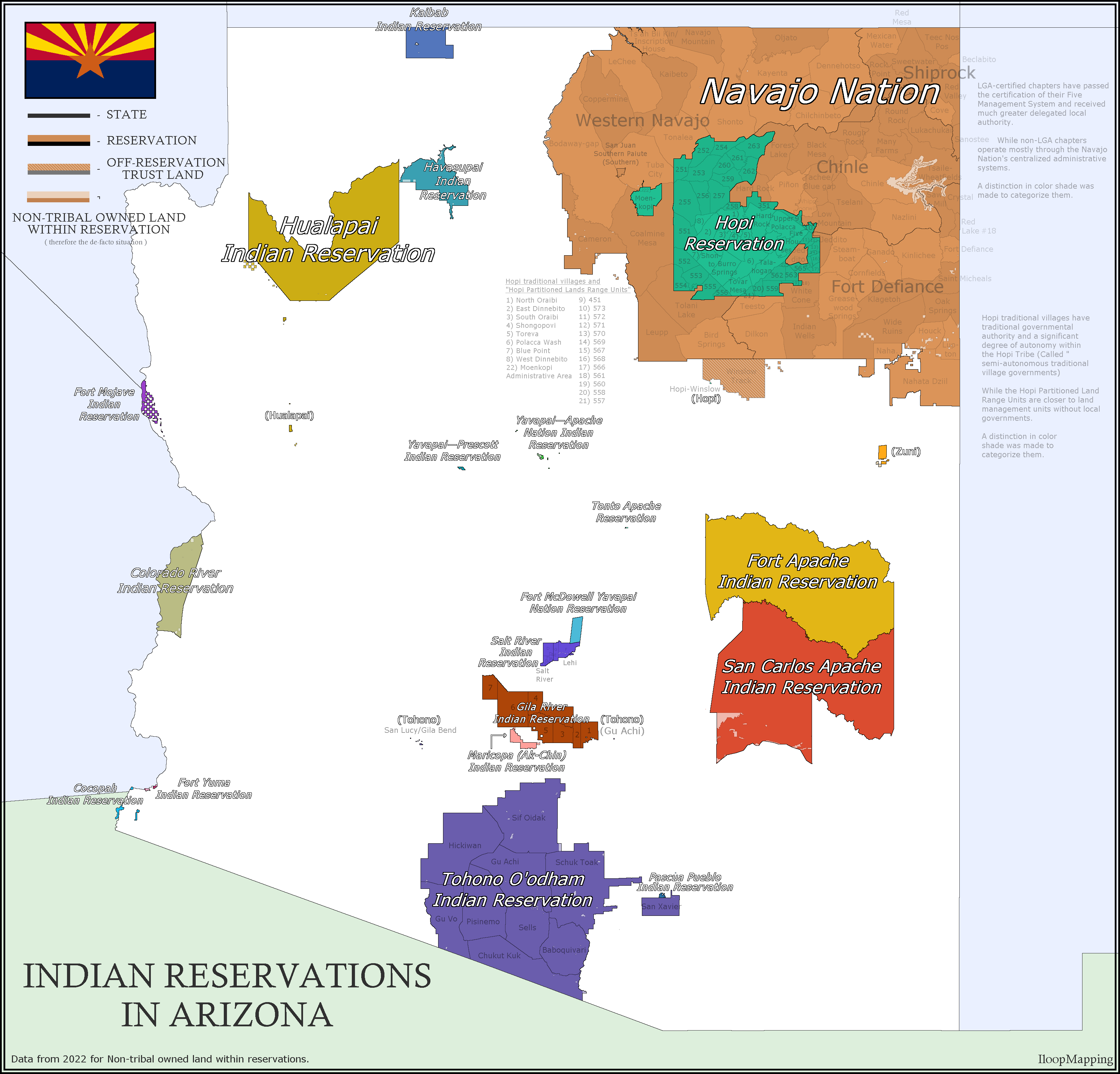
Map of the Tohono Oʼodham Nation and neighboring tribes.

The reservation was created in 1882 by President Chester A. Arthur, via executive order, and originally encompassed 22,400 acres.

In 1960, the Army Corps of Engineers completed construction of the Painted Rock Dam on the Gila River. Flood waters impounded by the dam periodically inundated approximately 10,000 acres (40 km^{2}) of the Gila Bend Reservation. The area lost by the tribe contained a 750-acre (3.0 km^{2}) farm and several communities. Residents were relocated to a 40-acre (160,000 m^{2}) parcel of land named San Lucy Village, near Gila Bend, Arizona. In January 1986, the enrolled members of the three reservations adopted a new tribal constitution that changed the tribe name from Papago Tribe of Arizona to the Tohono O'odham Nation and adopted a three-branch form of government. Also in 1986, the federal government and the Nation approved a settlement, called the Gila Bend Indian Reservation Lands Replacement Act, in which the Nation agreed to give up its legal claims in exchange for $30,000,000 and the right to add replacement land to its reservation. In 2011, the U.S. Congress passed the Gila Bend Indian Reservation Lands Replacement Clarification Act (H.R. 2938), which amended the 1986 Act to prohibit gaming activities on any of the land which the Nation acquired as a result of the earlier Act.
