= Maria Chona =

Native American weaver

Maria Chona (1845–1936) was a native American weaver and participant in anthropological research.

== Life ==
Maria Chona was born in 1845 on the Tohono O’odham reservation in what is now Arizona. Chona's Father José María was a leader within their community. In her childhood Chona learnt to weave, and became an accomplished basket weaver. In her early teens Chona was married off to the son of a medicine man, to whom she had a daughter. Becoming unhappy after her husband took another wife, Chona divorced him and returned to live with her parents. Upon remarrying, Chona moved to Tucson and had two sons.

== Anthropology involvement ==
In the 1930s Chona participated in Ruth Murray Underhill's research on the culture and lifestyle of the Tohono O'odham people. Underhill saw parallels between their lives, with both of them being divorced women working within what she saw a patriarchal societies. Because of this Underhill posited that Chona was a feminist. Author Liz Sonneborn notes that Underhill's research on Native American women is a unique contrast to other research at the time which predominantly focused on men, saying "these stories quietly detail the trials and triumphs of everyday life and the network of personal relationships Indian women traditionally had relied upon for their survival." Underhill helped Chona to publish her life story, "The Autobiography of a Papago Woman" - making her the first Southwestern Native American woman to do so.

== Works ==
- The Autobiography of a Papago Woman (1936)
