= Tohono Oʼodham =

Native American people of the Sonoran Desert

Tohono O'odham
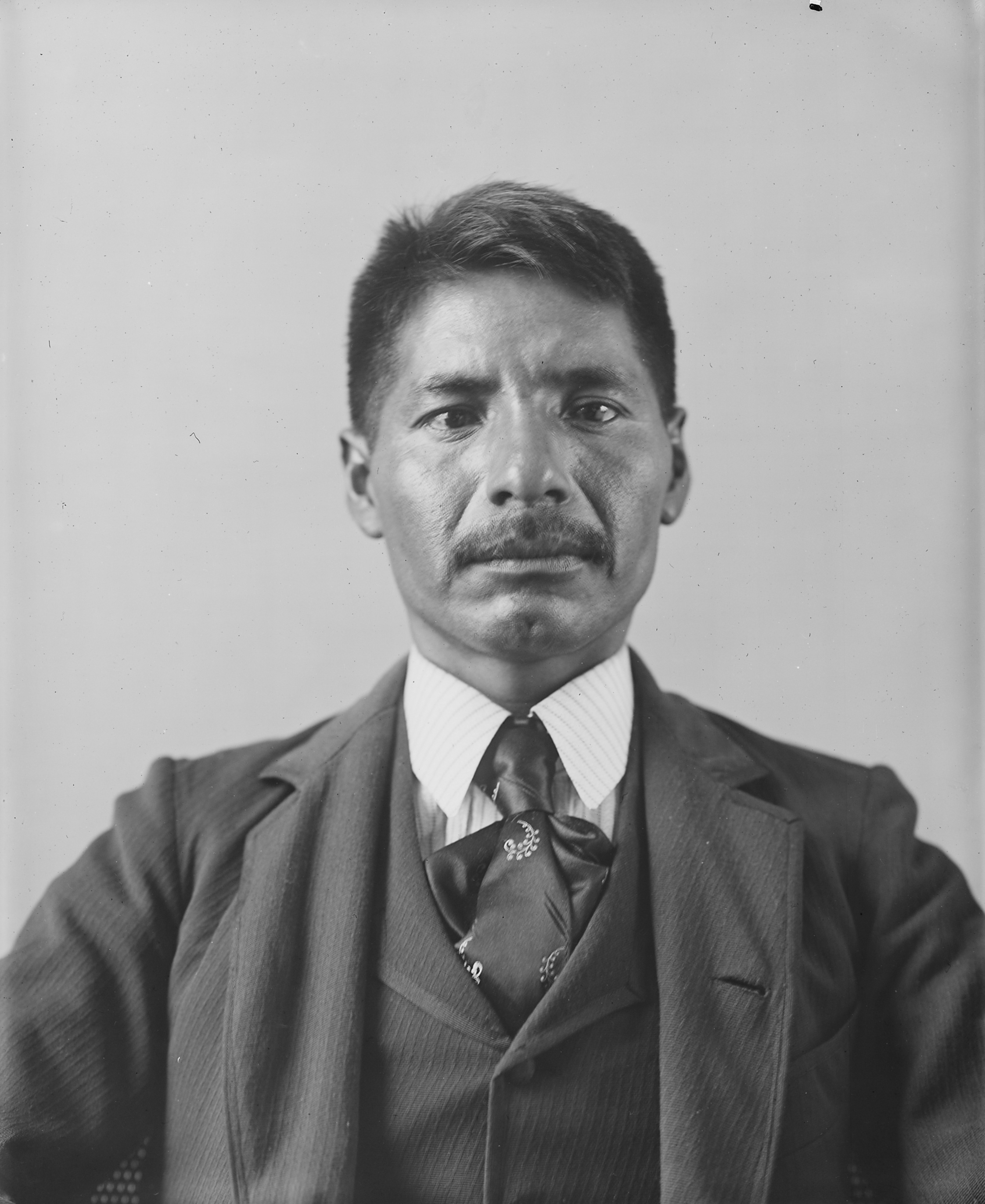
- Jose Lewis, Tohono O'odham, 1907 or earlier, Smithsonian Institution

Total population
- 29,543

Regions with significant populations
- United States (Arizona); Mexico (Sonora)

Languages
- O'odham, English, Spanish

Religion
- Indigenous religion, Catholic, Protestant

Related ethnic groups
- Hia C-eḍ O'odham, Akimel O'odham, Pima Bajo, Tepehuán

- People: Tohono O'odham
- Language: O'odham ha-ñe'okĭ
- Country: O'odham Jeweḍ

The Tohono O'odham (/təˈhoʊnoʊ ˈɔːtəm, - ˈoʊtəm/ tə-HOH-noh AW-təm, - OH-təm, O'odham: [ˈtɔhɔnɔ ˈʔɔʔɔd̪am]) are a Native American people of the Sonoran Desert, residing primarily in the U.S. state of Arizona and the northern Mexican state of Sonora. The United States federally recognized tribe is the Tohono O'odham Nation. The Ak-Chin Indian Community also has Tohono O'odham citizens.

The Tohono O'odham Nation governs the Tohono O'odham Indian Reservation, a major reservation in southern Arizona. It encompasses portions of Pima, Pinal, and Maricopa Counties and extends into the Mexican state of Sonora.

== Name ==
The Tohono O'odham tribal government and most of the people have rejected the common exonym Papago since the 1980s. They call themselves Tohono O'odham, meaning "desert people".

The Akimel O'odham, a neighboring tribe, referred to them as Ba꞉bawĭko'a, meaning "eating tepary beans". The Spanish colonizers learned that name from the Pima and transliterated it as Pápago. Anglo settlers in the area adopted that term.

== History ==
The historical lands of the Tohono O'odham stretched over much of what are now the jurisdictions of southern Arizona and Northern Mexico, across most of the Sonoran Desert. In the south, their land abutted against that of the Seris and Opata peoples. To the east, they ranged to at least the San Miguel River valley. The people may have migrated further east in seasonal travel. The Gila River represents the northern limits. To the west, their lands extended to the Colorado River and the Gulf of California. The frontiers of their territory would have been shared to an extent with neighboring tribes.

These lands are characterized by wide plains bordered by tall mountains. Water is scarce but is believed to have been more plentiful before European colonization. Their practices of cattle grazing and well drilling decreased stream flows. Localized natural springs provided water in some areas. In some areas, the people also relied on tinajas, or potholes, that were filled with rainwater in the mountains. Rains are intensely seasonal in the Sonoran Desert, with much rainfall occurring in late summer monsoons. Monsoon storms are generally fierce and produce flooding. The remainder of rainfall generally falls in winter and is more gentle. Snows are extremely rare, and winters have a few days below freezing. The growing season is very long, up to 264 days in places. Summer temperatures are extreme, reaching up to 120 °F (49 °C) for weeks at a time.

The Tohono O'odham migrated between summer and winter homes, usually moving to follow the water. They built their summer homes along alluvial plains, where they channeled summer rains onto fields they were cultivating. Some dikes and catchment basins were built, as was typical of Pima practices to the north. But most streams were not reliable enough for the people to build permanent canal systems. Winter villages were built in the mountains, to take advantage of more reliable water, and to enable the men to engage in hunting games.

Historically, the O'odham were enemies of the nomadic Apache from the late 17th until the beginning of the 20th century. The O'odham word for the Apache 'enemy' is ob. The O'odham were settled agricultural people who raised crops. According to their history, they knew the Apache would raid when they ran short on food or hunting was bad.

The relationship between the O'odham and Apache was especially strained after 1871 when 92 O'odham joined 48 Mexicans and six Anglo-Americans and killed an estimated 144 Apache in the Camp Grant massacre. All but eight of the dead were women and children. The O'odham also captured 29 Apache children, whom they sold into slavery in Mexico. Conflict with European settlers encroaching on their lands eventually led the O'odham and the Apache to find common interests.

Little of early O'odham history is known. That recorded by Europeans reflects their biases. The first European exploration and recording of O'odham lands was made in the early 1530s by Álvar Núñez Cabeza de Vaca of the ill-fated Narváez expedition. Esteban the Moor passed through these lands, one of the four survivors of the Narvaez expedition. He returned later to lead Fray Marcos de Niza in an attempt to find the mythical Seven Cities of Gold. Esteban was killed by the Zuni when he dishonored their customs, and de Niza cut short his journey. De Niza wrote that the native cities were grander than Mexico City, which led to the Coronado expedition.

Considerable evidence suggests that, before the late 17th century, the O'odham and Apache were friendly and engaged in the exchange of goods and marriage partners. But according to O'odham oral tradition, intermarriages resulted instead from raiding between the two tribes. It was typical for women and children to be taken captive in raids, for the victors to use as slaves. Women often married into the tribe in which they were held captive and assimilated under duress. Both tribes thus incorporated "enemies" and their children into their cultures.

The San Xavier District is the site of Mission San Xavier del Bac, the "White Dove of the Desert". This is a major tourist attraction near Tucson. Jesuit missionary and explorer Eusebio Kino founded the mission in 1700. Both the first and current church building were constructed by O'odham. The second building was constructed under direction of Franciscan priests, during a mission period from 1783 to 1797. The oldest European building in present-day Arizona, the mission is considered a premier example of Spanish colonial design. It is one of many missions built in the Southwest by the Spanish on what was then the northern frontier of their colony.

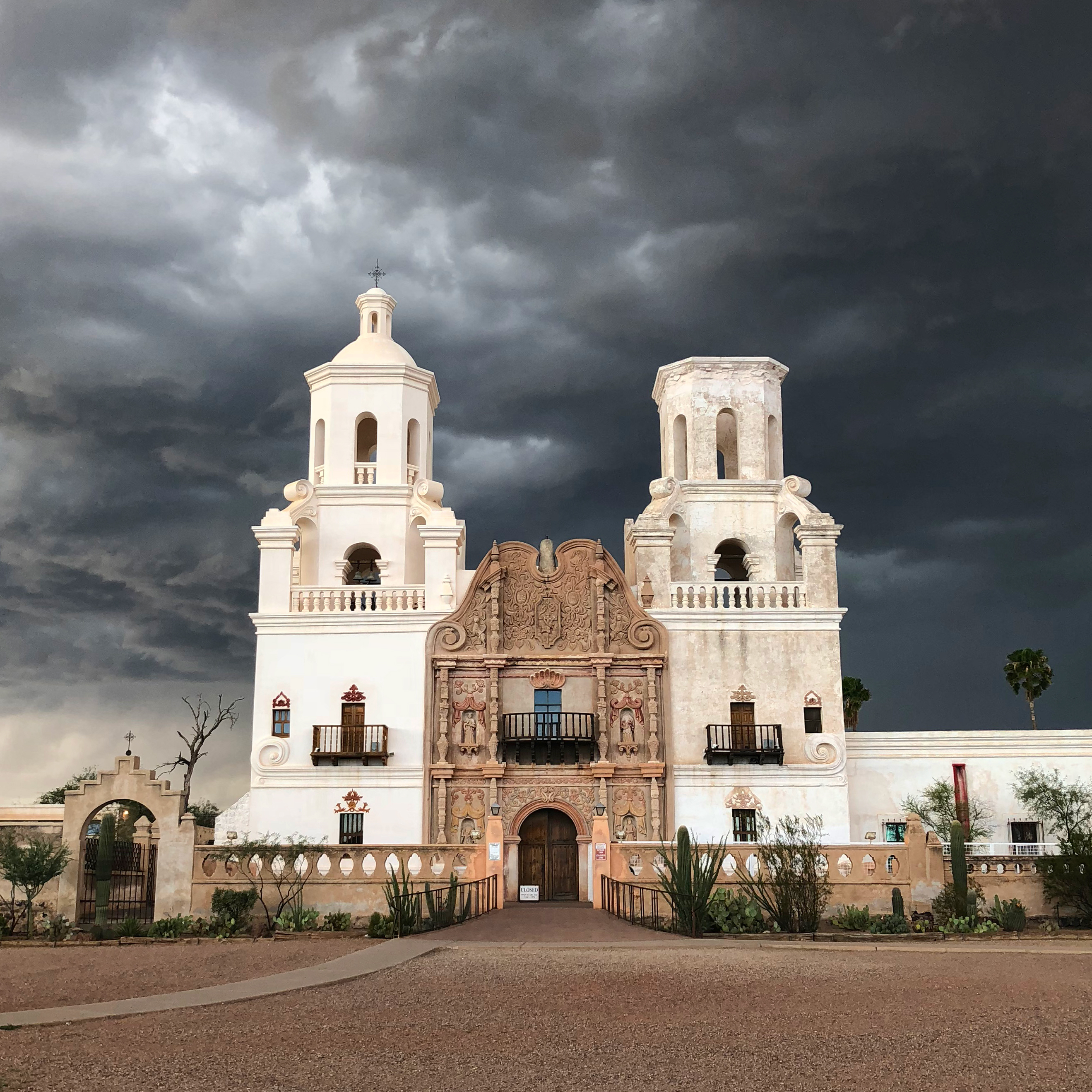
San Xavier del Bac

Tourists sometimes assume that the desert people had embraced the Catholicism of the Spanish conquistadors. Tohono O'odham villages resisted such change for hundreds of years. During the 1660s and in 1750s, two major rebellions rivaled the 1680 Pueblo Revolt in scale. Their armed resistance prevented the Spanish from increasing their incursions into the lands of Pimería Alta. The Spanish retreated to what they called Pimería Baja. As a result, the desert people preserved their traditions largely intact for generations.

== Culture ==
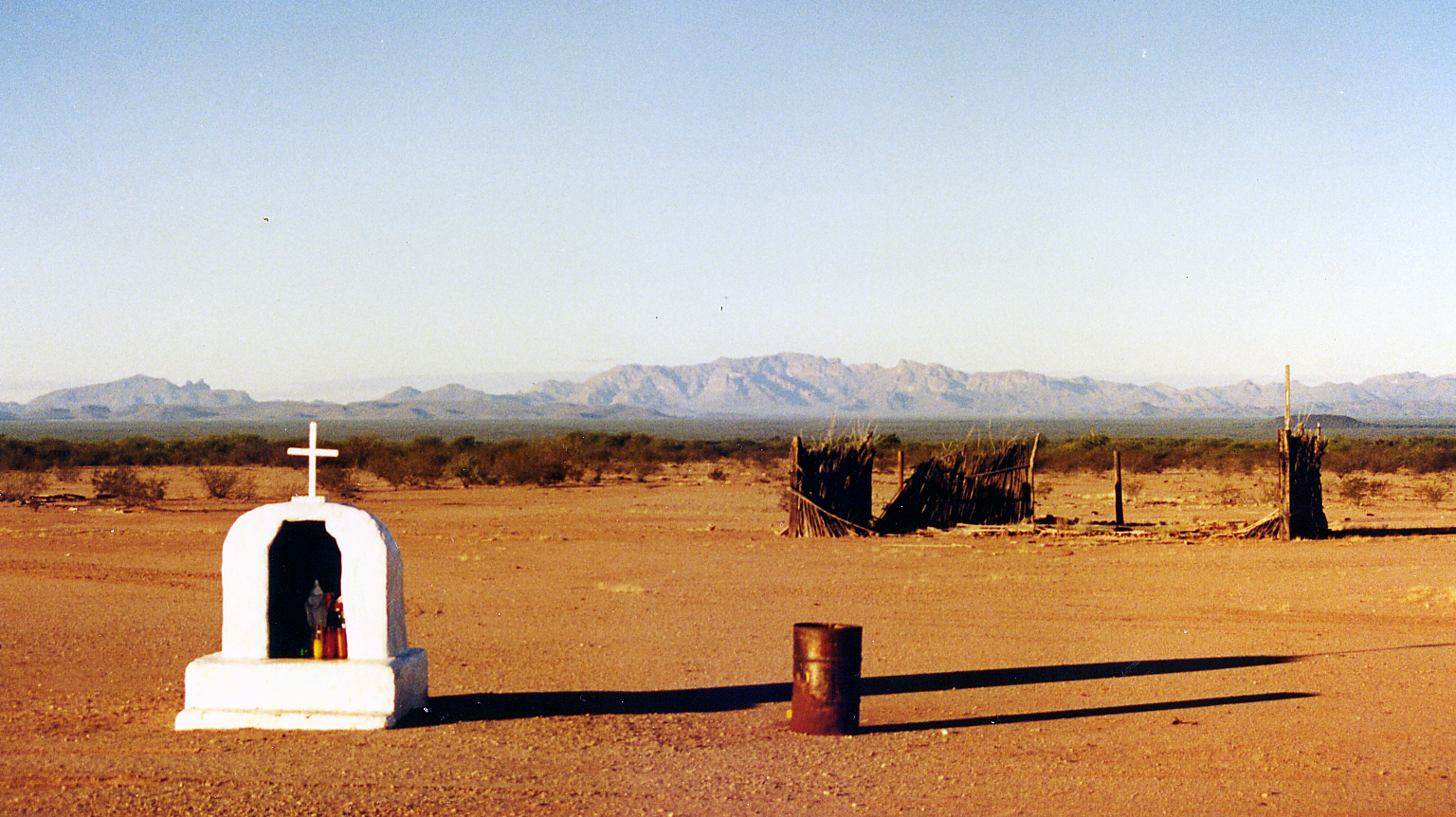
Shrine at Covered Wells, Arizona

The Tohono O'odham share linguistic and cultural roots with the closely related Akimel O'odham (People of the River), historically known as Pima, whose lands lie just south of present-day Phoenix, along the lower Gila River. The ancestors of both the Tohono O'odham and the Akimel O'odham resided along the major rivers of southern Arizona. Ancient pictographs adorn a rock wall that juts up out of the desert near the Baboquivari Mountains.

Eric Winston writes:

The O'odham were not a people in a political sense. Instead, their sense of belonging came from similar traditions and ways of life, language and related legends, and experiences shared in surviving in a beautiful but not entirely hospitable land.

Debates surround the origins of the O'odham. Claims that the O'odham moved north as recently as 300 years compete with claims that the Hohokam, who left the Casa Grande Ruins, are their ancestors.

In the Santa Barbara Mission Archive-Library are materials collected by a Franciscan friar who worked among the Tohono O'odham. These include scholarly volumes and monographs. The Office of Ethnohistorical Research, at the Arizona State Museum on the University of Arizona campus, has undertaken a documentary history of the O'odham, offering translated colonial documents that discuss Spanish relations with the O'odham in the 17th and 18th centuries.

O'odham musical and dance activities lack "grand ritual paraphernalia that call for attention" and grand ceremonies such as pow-wows. Instead, they wear muted white clay. O'odham songs are accompanied by hard wood rasps and drumming on overturned baskets, both of which lack resonance and are "swallowed by the desert floor". Dancing features skipping and shuffling quietly in bare feet on dry dirt. The raised dust is believed to assist in forming rain clouds.

=== Society ===
Society focused on the family, and each member had a specific role. Women were in charge of food preparation and also gathered the bulk of food, although everyone helped. Older girls in the family were in charge of fetching water each morning (the duty fell to the wife if there were no daughters). Women also wove baskets, and made pottery, such as ollas. Men hunted and performed many of the farming tasks. Older men hunted larger game like bighorn sheep; younger men and boys hunted small game. Most communities had a medicine man, a usually male position. Decisions were made by men in a communal fashion, with elders holding prominence. Children were free to play until age six, around which time they began to learn their roles. Grandparents and older siblings were the most frequent teachers, as parents tended to be very busy.

Marriages were generally arranged by parents, or if the parents had died, older siblings. Since individual villages tended to be closely related, marriages were generally between villages, as close relatives were not allowed to marry. Wives generally moved to their husbands' villages, but exceptions could be made if the wife's village needed more help. Polygamy was allowed. Women had little choice in whom they married, but could leave their marriage if unhappy; they would then return to their village and a new marriage would be arranged.

Society was intensely communal, and there were few positions of authority. Hunters shared their catches with the entire village. Food and supplies were shared with those who needed it. It was expected that those who had been given things in times of need would repay the debt when they could.

Despite a shared language and heritage, the O'odham were only loosely connected across their lands. Loyalty lay with the village, not the people. But the O'odham generally got along well with neighbors. They regularly gathered with nearby villages, and even partnered with them in times of conflict against outsider tribes. Gatherings for races, trade, socialization, and gossip were frequent. Gambling was a common recreation, with men playing a game with sticks similar to dice, and women playing a game that required tossing painted sticks. They bet trinkets such as shells or beads, as well as valuables such as blankets and mats. They also bet on races, the most important sport. Girls were already generally good runners due to being water fetchers, and everyone had to be able to run to escape danger or attacks. Daylong races were popular events, and courses were 10–15 mi (16–24 km). Women played toka, a field hockey-like game that is still enjoyed and is a school sport on the modern reservation.

==== Subgroups ====
Though they shared a linguistic root with the Pima, and could understand the languages of nearby tribes, such tribes were considered distant cousins at best. Even within the O'odham there were linguistic and cultural differences that made the groups only loosely united. Different groups had different origin stories, linguistic quirks, and appearances. Where a person lived was the best indicator of which group they belonged to. As of the 1700s, when Europeans began to categorize the tribes, there were probably at least six groups. The actual number of groups has varied by author. The following categorization is from Eric Winston's 1994 textbook on the O'odham, and includes seven groups, along with some subgroups.

- Himuris – They lived along the southern edge of O'odham lands, in modern Mexico. In the west they lived up to the confluence of the Altar River and the Magdalena River in what is now Magdalena de Kino. Their range extended all the way to the eastern reaches of the O'odham. They were the first to make contact with Europeans.
- Hia C-eḍ – Divided into northern and southern groups, they stretched along the western border of the lands, from the furthest north to the southernmost reaches. In the south they shared the land with the Seris, and those there may have had more in common with them than the rest of the O'odham. To the north they had contact with the Yumas, and the northern Hia C-eḍ shared some of their traits. The Hia C-eḍ dialect was the most distinct, and they spoke much faster than other groups. Since their lands were the hottest and driest they had very large ranges and migrations. Little of the land was suitable for farming, and thus the Hia C-eḍ were almost exclusively hunter-gatherers.
- Hu:huhla – The oldest group of the O'odham, they lived in a strip to the east of the Hia C-eḍ. The other tribes considered them "orphans"; it is possible they were there before the O'odham arrived and were assimilated. Their style of living mirrored the Hia C-eḍ, as their lands were also poor.
- Kohatk – They lived along the northern extent, and intermingled with the Pima. They extended south to modern Tucson. They had considerable trade and intermarriage with the Pima.
- Koklolodi – Situated above the Himuris, but below the Totokwan.
- Sobapuris – This easternmost group lived between the San Pedro and Santa Cruz rivers. They took more cues from the Pima and lived in more permanent settlements. Their lands were on the edge of the Sonoran Desert and thus had better water supplies, ensuring year-round settlement in most areas. Members left the village only to hunt and gather, and did not usually make seasonal migrations. Their cooler lands, fertile fields, and consistent water made their land the most desired by European settlers, and their lands were the first to be taken over. The Sobapuris suffered the most from colonization.
- Totokwan – Centered around Gu Achi Peak, they inhabited the ceremonial center of the northern O'odham.

=== Warfare ===
The O'odham were generally peaceful. They rarely initiated conflict and got along well with most neighboring tribes. The exception was the Apache, who were frequent raiders of the O'odham and other tribes. The Apache were to the east and northeast of the O'odham, and had probably moved into the area sometime in the 15th century. The Apache had limited interest in farming, preferring to raid neighboring tribes for supplies. The eastern O'odham, the Sobapuris, bore the brunt of Apache attacks.

=== Diet ===
The original O'odham diet consisted of regionally available wild game, insects, and plants. Through foraging, O'odham ate a variety of regional plants, such as ironwood seed, honey mesquite, hog potato, and organ-pipe cactus fruit. While the Southwestern United States does not have an ideal climate for cultivating crops, O'odham cultivated crops of white tepary beans, peas, and Spanish watermelons. They hunted pronghorn antelope, gathered hornworm larvae, and trapped pack rats for sources of meat. Preparation of foods included steaming plants in pits and roasting meat on open fires.

Saguaro cactus fruit was an especially important food. The Tohono O'odham use long sticks to harvest the fruits, which are then made into various products, including jams, syrups, and ceremonial wine. Tohono O'odham cooks made porridge from its edible seeds. The harvest begins in June; villages traveled to the saguaro stands for the duration of the harvest. A pair of saguaro ribs, about 6 m (20 ft) long, is bundled together to make a harvesting tool called a kuibit. The freshly harvested fruit is reduced into a thick syrup through several hours of boiling, as the fresh fruit does not keep for long. Four kilograms (9 pounds) of fruit yields about 1 liter (1/4 U.S. gallon) of syrup. Copious volumes of fruit are harvested; an example harvest in 1929 yielded 45,000 kg (99,000 lb) among 600 families. At the end of the harvest, each family contributed a small amount of syrup to a communal stock that the medicine man fermented. This was cause for rainmaking celebrations. Stories were told, there was much dancing, and songs were sung. Each man drank some of the saguaro wine. The resulting intoxicated state was seen as holy, and any dreams it brought on were considered portentous. This was the only time the O'odham drank alcohol.

Ak cin, known as "mouth of the wash", refers to the method whereby farmers monitored the weather for storm clouds. The appearance of storm clouds signified an imminent downpour. Farmers anticipated these moments and quickly prepped their plantations for seeding as the rain began. This type of agriculture was most commonly used during summer monsoons. Mission Garden in Tucson includes O'odham areas that show foods and farming methods before and after European contact. This includes planting in basins that hold the monsoon rains.

Traditional tribal foods were a combination of goods provided by nature and cultivated items. From nature, the Tohono O'odham consumed rabbit, sap, flour from mesquite trees (made by crushing the trees' pods), cholla cactus, and acorns. On the agricultural side of their diet, farmers focused on corn, squash, and tepary beans.

=== Lost traditions, modern times ===
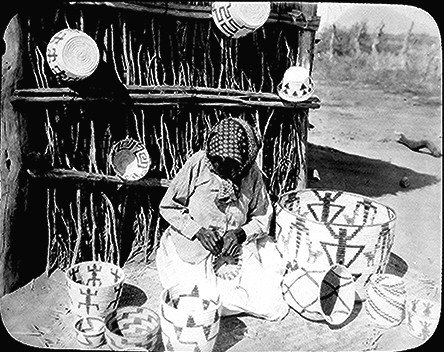
Tohono O'odham basket maker weaving, Arizona. Photograph by H. T. Cory, 1916.

When numerous Americans of Anglo-European ancestry began moving into the Arizona territory, the outsiders began to oppress the people's traditional ways. Unlike many tribes in the US, the Tohono O'odham never signed a treaty with the federal government, but they experienced challenges common to other nations.

As O'odham communal lands were allocated to households and some "surplus" sold to non-Native Americans under the Dawes Act of 1888, various religious groups entered the territory. Presbyterian missionaries built schools and missions there, vying with Roman Catholics and Mormons to convert the O'odham.

Major farmers established the cotton industry, initially employing O'odham as agricultural workers. Under the federal Indian policy of the late 19th and early 20th century, the government required Native children to attend Indian boarding schools. They were forced to use English, practice Christianity, and give up much of their tribal culture in an attempt to assimilate them into the American mainstream.

The current tribal government, established in the 1930s under the Indian Reorganization Act of 1934, reflects years of commercial, missionary, and federal intervention. While the federal government encouraged tribes to reestablish their governments, it approved models based on the US electoral system. The goal was to make the Indians into "real" Americans, but the boarding schools generally offered training only for low-level domestic and agricultural labor, typical of jobs available in rural areas. "Assimilation" was the official policy, but full participation was not the goal. Boarding school students were supposed to function within the segregated society of the United States as economic laborers, not leaders.

The Tohono O'odham have retained many traditions and still speak their language. But since the late 20th century, US mass culture has influenced and in some cases eroded O'odham traditions, as children adopt new trends in technology and other practices.

=== Health ===
Beginning in the 1960s, government intervention in the tribe's agricultural cultivation caused the Tohono O'odham to shift from a plant-based diet to one that favored foods high in fat and calories. The government began to close off the tribe's water source, preventing it from growing traditional crops. This resulted in widespread type 2 diabetes among the tribe. The adaptation of a processed food diet caused type 2 diabetes to rise at alarming rates, with nearly 60 percent of the tribe's adult population facing this disease and 75 percent of children expected to contract it in their lifetimes. Children are also at risk of childhood obesity.

Many of the original crops the Indigenous group produced, such as tepary beans, squash, and the buds of cholla cactus, could have aided in combating the diabetes crisis. These foods had nutrients that would have helped normalize blood sugar and minimize the impact of diabetes. But because of government intervention, many of these foods were lost. A local nonprofit, Tohono O'odham Community Action (TOCA), has built a set of food systems programs that contribute to public health, cultural revitalization, and economic development. It has started a cafe that serves traditional foods.

The Tohono O'odham have made efforts to rehabilitate the systems they had in place before government intervention. The group has been advocating for the restoration of their water privileges so that they can grow traditional crops. Moreover, even in tribal schools, such as those in the local Baboquivari Unified School District, the quality of lunch programs is being reassessed to offer healthier options.

The Tohono O'odham Nation is one of the few Indigenous groups in the US to offer its citizens access to medical treatment. Requirements for this include being a citizen of Mexico and of the Tohono O'odham Nation. As advocacy for the border wall continues to grow, inspections and securities along these boundaries have heightened, limiting tribal members' access to resources beyond the border.

=== Cultural revitalization ===
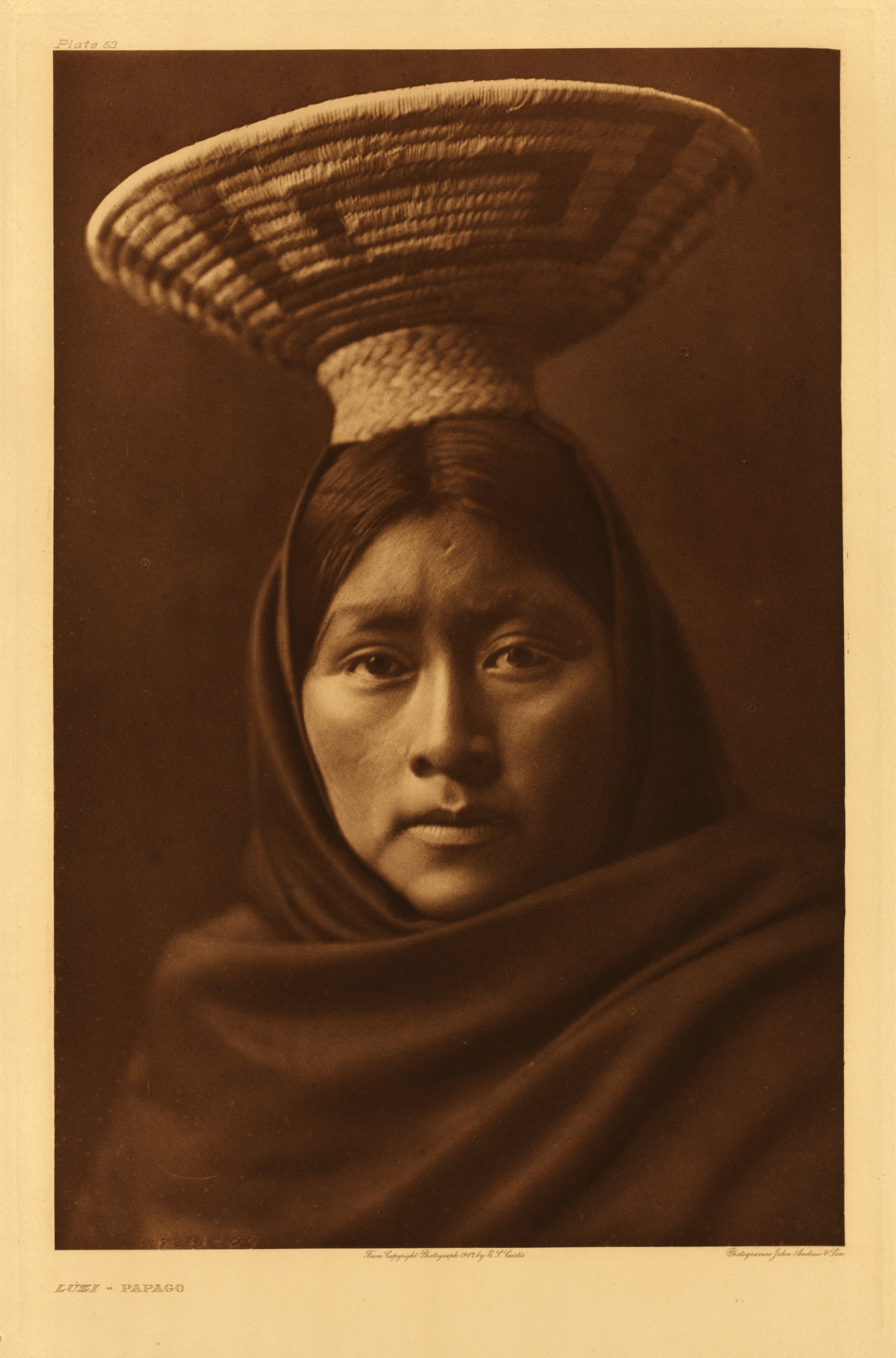
Luzi, a Tohono Oʼodham woman photograph by Edward Curtis circa 1905

Since 1938, the nation has held the Sells Rodeo and Parade in its capital in February. It celebrates traditional frontier skills of riding and managing cattle.

In the visual arts, Michael Chiago and Leonard Chana gained widespread recognition for their paintings and drawings of traditional O'odham activities and scenes. Chiago has exhibited at the Heard Museum and has contributed cover art to Arizona Highways magazine and University of Arizona Press books. Chana illustrated books by Tucson writer Byrd Baylor and created murals for Tohono O'odham Nation buildings.

In 2004, the Heard Museum awarded Danny Lopez its first heritage award, recognizing his lifelong work sustaining the desert people's way of life. At the National Museum for the American Indian (NMAI), the Tohono O'odham were represented in the founding exhibition and Lopez blessed the exhibit.

=== Tucson Indian School ===
Tohono O'odham children were required to attend Indian boarding schools, designed to teach them the English language and assimilate them into mainstream European-American ways. The Tohono O'odham attended the Tucson Indian School. It was founded in 1886, when T. C. Kirkwood, superintendent of the board of national missions of the Presbyterian Church in the United States, asked the Tucson Common Council for land near where the University of Arizona was built. The Common Council granted the Board of Home Missions a 99-year lease on land at $1 a year. The Board purchased 42 acres (17 ha) of land on the Santa Cruz River from pioneer Sam Hughes.

The new facility opened in 1888, with 54 boys and girls. At the new semi-religious boarding school, boys learned rural trades like carpentry and farming and girls were taught sewing and similar domestic skills. Additional buildings were completed in 1890 but the school was still too small for the demand, and students had to be turned away. To raise funds and support its expansion, its superintendent entered into a contract with the city of Tucson to grade and maintain streets. While officially called the Tucson Indian Training School, "any person of either sex, regardless of race or color" who showed "promise of development into a Christian leader or citizen and whose educational needs may, in the judgement of the school, be better served by the school than by another available resource" was eligible for admission.

In 1903, Jose Xavier Pablo, who later became a leader in the Tohono O'odham Nation, graduated from the school. In 1906, the school bought the land it was leasing from Tucson and sold it at a significant profit. In 1907, it purchased land just east of the Santa Cruz River, near present-day Ajo Way, and built a new school. It opened in 1908; it has a separate post office, the Escuela Post Office. Sometimes this name was used in place of "Tucson Indian School".

By the mid-1930s, the Tucson Indian School covered 160 acres, had nine buildings, and could educate 130 students. In 1940, students at the school came from about 18 different tribes. As ideas about educating tribal children changed, the federal government began to support letting children live with their families. By August 1953, it had no grades lower than 7th grade. In 1960, the school closed. The site was developed as Santa Cruz Plaza, just southwest of Pueblo Magnet High School.

== Tohono O'odham Nation ==
The Tohono O'odham Nation in the US occupies a reservation that incorporates part of its people's original Sonoran desert lands. It has 11 districts. The land is in three Arizona counties: Pima, Pinal, and Maricopa. The reservation's land area is 11,534.012 square kilometres (4,453.307 sq mi), the third-largest Indian reservation area in the US (after the Navajo Nation and the Uintah and Ouray Indian Reservation). The 2000 census reported 10,787 people living on reservation land. The tribe's enrollment office tallies a population of 25,000, with 20,000 living on its Arizonan reservation lands.

=== Government ===
The nation is governed by a three-branch system. The executive includes a chairman and vice-chairman elected by eligible adult members of the nation. Elections are conducted under a complex formula intended to ensure that the rights of small O'odham communities are protected as well as the interests of larger communities and families. The legislative branch includes the tribal council, made up of two representatives from each district. The third branch is the judicial, which has five judges. The chairman is Ned Norris Jr., vice chairwoman is Wavalene Saunders, legislative chairman is Timothy Joaquin Gu Achi, and chief judge is Donald Harvey.

=== Lands ===
Like other tribes, the Tohono O'odham felt land pressures from American ranchers, settlers, and railroads. Documentation was poor, and many members did not leave their lands in a written will. Assistant US attorney general John F. Trudell recorded an O'odham man saying: "I do not know anything about a land grant. The Mexicans never had any land to give us. From the earliest times our fathers have owned land which was given to them by the Earth's prophet." Because the O'odham lived on public lands or had no documentation of ownership, their holdings were threatened by white cattle herders in the 1880s, but used their history of cooperation with the government in the Apache Wars to bargain for land rights. Today, O'odham lands comprise multiple reservations:

- The main reservation, Tohono O'odham Indian Reservation, in central Pima, southwestern Pinal, and southeastern Maricopa Counties, has a land area of 11,243.098 square kilometres (4,340.984 sq mi) and a 2000 census population of 8,376. The land area is 97.48 percent of the total, and the population is 77.65 percent of the total of the entire reservation's.
- The San Xavier Indian Reservation, at 32°03′00″N 111°05′02″W, in Pima County, in the southwestern Tucson metropolitan area, has a land area of 288.895 square kilometres (111.543 sq mi) and a resident population of 2,053.
- The San Lucy District comprises seven small non-contiguous parcels of land in and northwest of the town of Gila Bend in southwestern Maricopa County. Their land area is 1.915 square kilometres (473 acres), with a total population of 304.
- The Florence Village District is just southwest of the town of Florence in central Pinal County. It is a single parcel of land with an area of 0.1045 square kilometres (25.8 acres) and a population of 54.

== Tohono O'odham Community Action (TOCA) ==
In 1996, Terrol Dew Johnson and Tristan Reader co-founded Tohono O'odham Community Action (TOCA) in Sells, Arizona, to restore and reintegrate lost tribal traditions. TOCA started as a community garden and offered basket-weaving classes. The organization has expanded and has two farms, a restaurant, and an art gallery.

Another reason TOCA was founded is that the tribe was on the brink of collapse as a result of growing dependency on welfare and food stamps. The Tohono O'odham had the lowest per capita income of any Indigenous reservation, with 65 percent of members living below the poverty line and 70 percent facing unemployment. Crime among the younger generation rapidly increased as a result of gang activity and the high school dropout rate was over 50 percent. Homicide was prevalent, at a rate three times the national average.

In 2009, TOCA opened its restaurant, Desert Rain Café. It brings traditional tribal foods to the community to help combat type 2 diabetes. Each menu item has at least one traditional ingredient, such as mesquite meal, prickly pear, or agave syrup. TOCA's farms produce crops such as tepary beans and squash, providing customers with fresh meals. Dishes include Mesquite oatmeal cookies, short rib stew, brown tepary bean quesadillas, and pico de gallo. It has been estimated that the restaurant serves over 100,000 meals yearly.

Baskets were used in rain ceremonies that lasted four days and nights. They were also purposed for daily use to hold or prepare foods. Johnson held weekly classes for artisans throughout the reservation. Making a basket could take as long as a year, because the fibers must be harvested and prepared and a design created that represents Tohono O'odham history. Materials for baskets vary between grasses native to the area, such as Yucca grass and devil's claw plant.

== Martin Luther King Jr.'s first visit to an Indian reservation ==
On September 20, 1959, Martin Luther King Jr. flew to Tucson from Los Angeles to give a talk at the Sunday Evening Forum. That night, he gave a speech called "A Great Time To Be Alive" at the University of Arizona auditorium, now called Centennial Hall. Afterward, a reception was held for King, at which he was introduced to Casper Glenn, the pastor of the Southside Presbyterian Church. King was very interested in this racially mixed church and arranged to visit it the next day.

The next morning, Glenn picked King up in his station wagon and drove him to the Southside Presbyterian Church. There, Glenn showed King photographs he had taken of the racially diverse congregation, most of whom were Tohono O'odham. Upon seeing the photos, Glenn has said, "King said he had never been on an Indian reservation, nor had he ever had a chance to get to know any Indians." He then requested to be driven to the reservation.

The two men traveled on Ajo Way to Sells, on what was then called the Papago Indian Reservation, now the Tohono O'odham Indian Reservation. When they arrived at the tribal council office, the tribal leaders were surprised to see King and felt honored that he had come. King was eager to talk to them but circumspect with his questions. "He was fascinated by everything that they shared with him", Glenn said.

The ministers then went to the Presbyterian church in Sells, which had been recently constructed by its members with funds from the national Presbyterian church. King spoke to Pastor Towsand, who was excited to meet King. On the way back to Tucson, "King expressed his appreciation of having the opportunity to meet the Indians", Glenn recalled.

== Districts ==
- Gu Achi District
- Pisinemo District
- Sif Oidak District
- Sells District
- Baboquivari District
- Hickiwan District
- San Lucy District
- Gu Vo District
- Chukut Kuk District
- San Xavier District
- Schuk Toak District

== Notable Tohono O'odham ==
- Annie Antone, pictorial basketweaver
- Gabriella Cázares-Kelly, educator, community organizer, and politician
- Maria Chona, basketweaver
- Juan Dolores, early Tohono O'odham linguist
- Terrol Dew Johnson, basketweaver and native food and health advocate
- Augustine Lopez, Tohono O'odham nation chairman
- Raul Mendoza, basketball coach
- Ponka-We Victors, Kansas state legislator
- Ofelia Zepeda, linguist, poet, writer

== See also ==
- O'odham language
- Akimel O'odham (River people)
- Hia C-eḍ O'odham (Sand people)
- List of dwellings of Pueblo peoples
- Camp Grant massacre
- Chicken scratch
- Shadow Wolves
- Sobaipuri
- Tohono O'odham High School
