= Tohono Oʼodham Nation =

Tohono O'odham Nation
- Indian reservation
- Seal

- Location in Arizona
- Country: United States
- Tribe: Tohono O'odham
- State: Arizona
- Counties: Maricopa; Pima; Pinal
- Established: 1874 (executive order)
- Main expansions: 1882–1916
- First constitution: 1937
- Tripartite system: 1986
- Capital: Sells, Arizona
- Subdivisions: 11 districts

Government
  - Body: Tohono O'odham Legislative Council
  - Chairman: Verlon M. Jose
  - Vice-Chairwoman: Carla L. Johnson

Area
  - Total: 4,400 sq mi (11,300 km^{2})

Population (2017)
  - Total: 10,703
  - Density: 2.45/sq mi (0.947/km^{2})
- Time zone: MST
- Website: tonation-nsn.gov

The Tohono O'odham Nation is the collective government body of the Tohono O'odham people in the United States. The Tohono Oʼodham Nation governs four separate sections of land with a combined area of more than 2.8 million acres (11,330 km^{2}), approximately the size of Connecticut and the second-largest Indigenous land holding in the United States. These lands are in the Sonoran Desert of south central Arizona and border the Mexico–United States border for 62 miles (100 km). The Nation is organized into 11 local districts and has a tripartite system of government. Sells is the Nation's largest community and functions as its capital. The Nation has about 37,000 enrolled members, most of whom live off of the reservations.

== History ==
In 1874, President of the United States Ulysses S. Grant signed an executive order creating the San Xavier Indian Reservation, surrounding the 18th-century Mission San Xavier del Bac. In 1882, President Chester A. Arthur signed an executive order creating the Gila Bend Indian Reservation as additional lands for the Tohono O'odham people. In 1916, a third reservation was created by executive order with Indian Oasis (now Sells, Arizona) as its headquarters. In 1937, The Tohono O'odham Nation, then called the Papagos Tribe of Arizona, adopted its first constitution.

In 1960, the Army Corps of Engineers completed construction of the Painted Rock Dam on the Gila River. Flood waters impounded by the dam periodically inundated approximately 10,000 acres (40 km^{2}) of the Gila Bend Indian Reservation. The area the tribe lost contained a 750-acre (3.0 km^{2}) farm and several communities. Residents were relocated to a 40-acre (160,000 m^{2}) parcel of land named San Lucy Village, near Gila Bend, Arizona. In January 1986, the enrolled members of the three reservations adopted a new tribal constitution that changed the tribe name from Papago Tribe of Arizona to the Tohono O'odham Nation and adopted a three-branch form of government. Also in 1986, the federal government and the Nation approved a settlement whereby the Nation agreed to give up its legal claims in exchange for $30,000,000 and the right to add replacement land to its reservation. (Note: Public Law 99-503 specifies that the tribe may purchase up to 10,000 acres (40 km^{2}) unincorporated land in Pima, Pinal, or Maricopa counties which the federal government will place into trust, thereby making it legally part of the reservation.)

In 2009, the tribe announced that it had purchased approximately 135 acres (0.55 km^{2}) near Glendale, Arizona. The city of Glendale and the Gila River Indian Community opposed attempts to develop the land though court challenges and supporting a measure passed by the Arizona House of Representatives that would allow the city of Glendale to incorporate land the tribe owned, making it ineligible for inclusion within the reservation. As of March 2014, after a change of heart, the City of Glendale has been negotiating with the Nation over its proposed West Valley casino. The McCain-Franks bill was designed to prohibit the Glendale project and in the process would have changed federal law by unilaterally repealing critical parts of the Gila Bend Indian Reservation Lands Replacement Act, which was passed to settle a dispute over federal flooding of tribal reservation lands.

In 2009, the Nation acquired 650 acres (2.6 km^{2}) of land near Why, Arizona, with the intention of eventually creating a new district of the Tohono O'odham Nation for the Hia C-eḍ O'odham. On October 30, 2012, a new tribal law created the Hia-Ced District as the new 12th district of the Tohono O'odham Nation. On April 25, 2015, the Hia-Ced District was dissolved by referendum vote, returning the Nation to its original 11 districts.

== People ==
Most Tohono O'odham people live in the United States. A small number are across the international border in northwestern Mexico. The Tohono Oʼodham Nation speaks a common language, O'odham, which is the 10th most-spoken indigenous language in the United States. While the people are nominally Catholic, the Nation's schools teach native language and culture.

The Nation has about 34,000 enrolled members. Most of its members live off the reservations. The main reservation, Tohono O'odham Indian Reservation, has a resident population of about 11,000. The San Xavier Indian Reservation has a resident population of 1,200. The Gila Bend Indian Reservation has a population of about 1,700, and Florence Village has a population of about 195. The remaining roughly 14,600 members live off the reservations.

== Geography ==
The lands of the Nation are in the Sonoran Desert in south central Arizona, in areas of a series of parallel mountains and valleys. The vegetation is consistent with other parts of the Sonoran Desert. Saguaro cactus, Cholla, prickly pear, palo verde, velvet mesquite, whitethorn acacia, desert ironwood, and willow are the dominant vegetation in the landscape. The landscape is interspersed with plains and mountains. These include the Quinlan and Baboquivari Mountains, which include Kitt Peak, the Kitt Peak National Observatory and telescopes, and Baboquivari Peak. (Note: The observatory sites are under lease from the Tohono O'odham Nation. The lease was approved by the council in the 1950s, for a one-time payment of $25,000 plus $10 per acre per year.)

Sells, Arizona, is the Nation's largest community and functions as the capital. The Tohono O'odham Nation occupies four separate pieces of land for a combined area of 2.8 million acres (11,330 km^{2}), making it the second-largest Native American land holding in the U.S. The lands include the main reservation, the Gila Bend Reservation, San Xavier Reservation, and Florence Village. Of the four lands bases, the largest is the main reservation at more than 2.7 million acres (10,925 km^{2}). The San Xavier reservation is the second-largest, at 71,095 acres (287.71 km^{2}), just south of Tucson. The Gila Bend Indian Reservation is 473 acres (1.91 km^{2}) and Florence Village 25 acres (0.10 km^{2}). With the 1853 Gadsden Purchase, the territory of the Tohono O'odham was split between the U.S. and Mexico. Consequently, the Nation is directly exposed to the Mexico–United States border for 74 miles (119 km). There is no reservation for the Tohono O'odham people in Mexico, so the Nation's southern border is the Mexico–United States border.

== Border issues ==
=== Pre-contact to 1900 ===
Before colonization, the O'odham migrated along a north–south axis in a "two village" system, rotating between summer and winter settlements. These migrations formed the foundation of their subsistence economies and enabled religious pilgrimages. This pattern continued throughout Apache, Spanish, and American expansion, but shifted with the re-drawing of boundaries that followed the Mexican–American War. Unlike aboriginal groups along the U.S.–Canada border, the Tohono O'odham were not offered dual citizenship when the U.S. drew a border across their lands in 1853 by the Gadsden Purchase. The Treaty of Guadalupe Hidalgo did not specify the rights of the O'odham to cross the international border. The population was split between Mexico and the U.S., but after the treaty the U.S. government guaranteed that O'odham freedom of movement would be protected. For decades, members of the nation continued to move freely across the international border. Throughout this time, tribal members traveled and migrated to work, participate in religious ceremonies, keep medical appointments in Sells, and visit relatives. The O'odham were deliberate in attending their religious festivals, and left their employers for two to four weeks to travel to Magdalena, Sonora. O'odham labor was so valued that employers began to drive their O'odham employees to the festivals rather than lose 4–8 days of labor while tribal members traveled by wagon. The end of the 19th century and beginning of the 20th saw a decline in the subsistence economies of the O'odham, and after the Bureau of Indian Affairs drilled wells for them, their need to migrate declined. Despite these changes, the O'odham continued to move through the region with their families, working as hired hands on farms, mines, and ranches where work appeared.

=== 1900–2000 ===
The pre-contact legacy and economic lifestyles of the O'odham gave them a "transnational identity", but Indigenous conflicts on the Mexico–United States barrier arose. Land theft and forced assimilation decreased the numbers of southern O'odham and alienated them from their northern counterparts. By 1910, it was estimated that only 1,000 O'odham remained in Mexico. The disparities in wealth between the two sides also led to cultural shifts. The traditional practice of lending between O'odham decreased as many Arizona O'odham felt that those on the Mexican side would not be able to pay loans back. During WWI concerns were raised about the proximity of the O'odham to the border, but the U.S. government ignored requests for additional military presence, and trans-border smuggling thrived in the 1910s and 1920s. This included liquor, food, and guns. The War Department attempted to halt this, but the reporting system on such a wide area of land was slow and ineffective. The O'odham were accused of participating in the Yaquis' international weapons smuggling. As Mexicans were deported during the Great Depression, the Mexican government gave them O'odham tribal lands. Notions of isolation were further intensified during WWII as the U.S.–Mexico border was militarized to protect against potential invasions via the Sea of Cortez, and tribal lands in Sonora were privatized to increase government production.

In 1977, the Los Angeles Times reported that Mexican O'odham were taking advantage of medical facilities and welfare checks on the Arizona side of the border. An increase in militarization occurred again in the 1980s and 1990s, further inhibiting tribal members from traveling back and forth and slowing migration. The Mexican government made gestures to improve the condition of the O'odham in Mexico by opening the office of the National Indian Institute, but the office struggled with inadequate resources and institutionalized corruption. In the 1980s, O'odham in Sonora responded to decades of land theft and bureaucratic failure by staging an occupation at the "weak and underfunded" National Indian Institute offices. The tribal constitution ratified in 1986 reads: "All members of the Tohono O'odham Nation shall be given equal opportunity to participate in the economic resources and activities of the Tohono O'odham Nation." Many tribal members felt these promises were not guaranteed. At the end of the decade, O'odham on the Mexican side of the border wrote an "open letter" to O'odham on the American side. In it they wrote: "our human rights and aboriginal rights have slowly been violated or disappeared in Mexico." This articulated the concerns of many O'odham about the growing international divide and population loss in Sonora. In its 1990 census, the Mexican government recorded no O'odham living in Sonora.

=== 2000–present ===
The O'odham saw a subsequent rise in illegal crossing and smuggling through tribal lands as the surrounding security increased. In 2003 the Nation hosted a Congressional hearing on illegal activity on tribal lands. In the hearing tribal leaders and law enforcement officers testified about "incidents of cross-border violence, and even incursions by Mexican military personnel in support of drug smugglers." Along with the cross-border violence, tribal members continued to experience other social and legal consequences from the border. Tribal members born in Mexico or who had insufficient documentation to prove U.S. birth or residency found themselves trapped in a remote corner of Mexico with no access to the tribal centers only tens of miles away. In 2001, a bill was proposed that would give citizenship to all Tohono O'odham, but it was forgotten in the aftermath of 9/11. Since then, bills have repeatedly been introduced in Congress to solve the "one people-two country" problem by granting U.S. citizenship to all enrolled members of the Tohono O'odham, but so far they have not passed. Opponents of granting U.S. citizenship to all enrolled members of the Nation say that many births on the reservation have been informally recorded and the records are susceptible to easy alteration or falsification. O'odham can cross the border with Tribal Identification Cards, but these can be denied at the border and legal documentation on the reservation is poor. Separation from family members and detainment are possibilities for O'odham crossing into the United States.

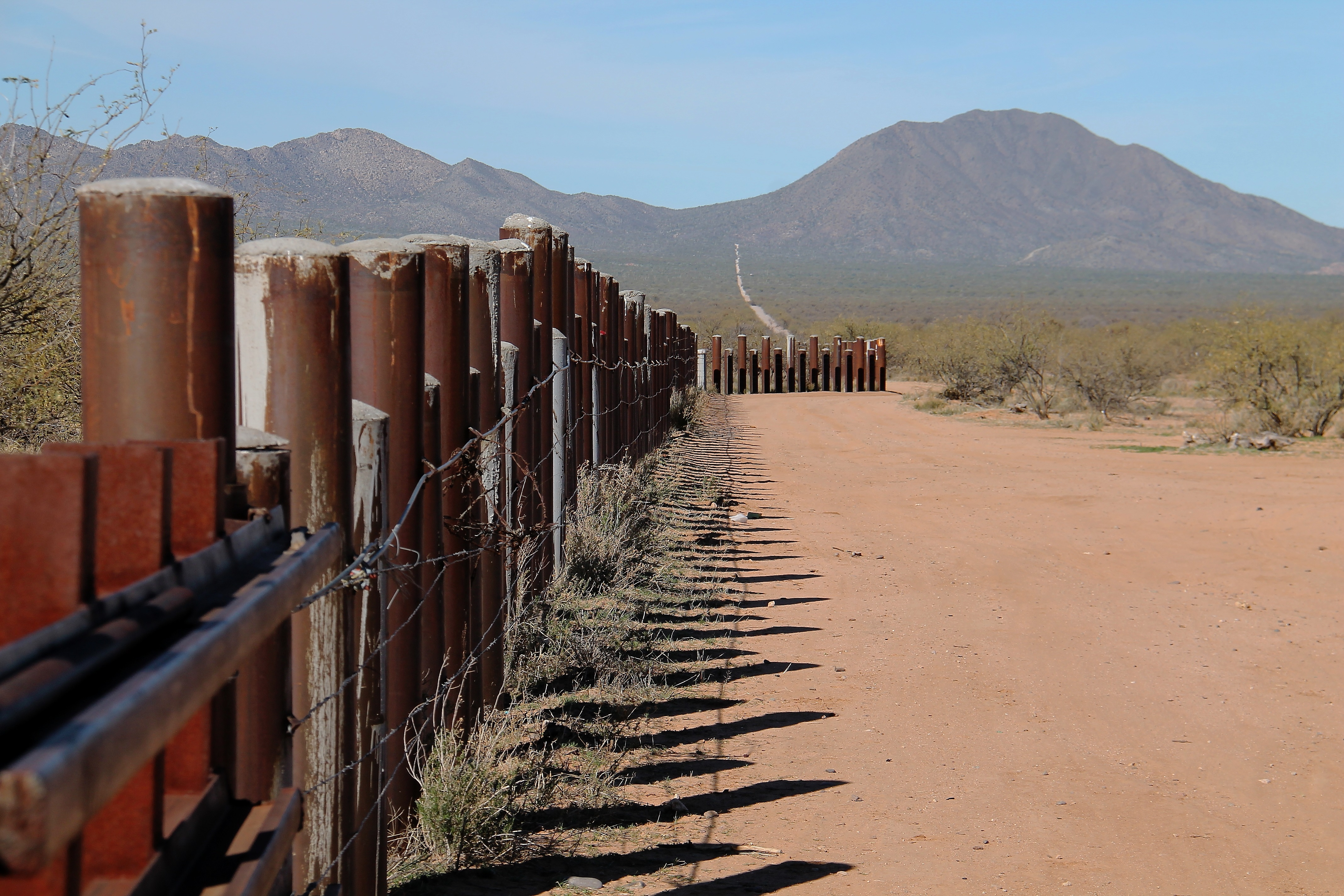
Border fence, photograph from Tohono O'odham Nation

Today, the tribal government incurs extra costs due to the proximity of the U.S.–Mexico border. There are also associated social problems. In an area of acute poverty, offers from smugglers for O'odham to assist in illegal activity are common, and in some instances drug traffickers have purchased O'odham land along the border. Many of the thousands of Mexican and other nationals illegally crossing the border to work in U.S. agriculture or to smuggle drugs into the U.S. seek emergency assistance from the Tohono O'odham police when they become dehydrated or are stranded. On the ground, border patrol emergency rescue and tribal EMTs coordinate and communicate. The tribe and the state of Arizona pay a large proportion of the bills for border-related law enforcement and emergency services. Former Arizona governor Janet Napolitano and Tohono O'odham government leaders have repeatedly asked the federal government to repay the state and tribe for the costs of border-related emergencies. Tribe Chairman Ned Norris Jr. has complained about the lack of reimbursement for border enforcement.

Citing the impact it would have on wildlife and on the tribe's members, Tohono O'odham tribal leaders made a series of official statements opposing President Donald Trump's plan to build a wall along the U.S.–Mexico border. While the 1986 Tohono O'odham constitution gives the tribe sovereignty over its territory, this is nonetheless subject to the plenary power of Congress. About 2,000 members live in Mexico, and a wall would physically separate them from members in the U.S. Most of the 25,000 Tohono O'odham today live in southern Arizona, but several thousand, many related by kinship, live in northern Sonora, Mexico. Many tribal members still make an annual pilgrimage to San Xavier del Bac and Magdalena, Sonora, during St. Francis festivities to commemorate St. Francis Xavier and St. Francis of Assisi, founder of the Franciscan Order.

=== Integrated fixed towers ===
Integrated fixed towers (IFTs) are solar-powered structures that integrate high technology, such as infrared and video machinery, to provide long-range, 360-degree, all-weather surveillance along the border. The proposed layout and size of the IFTs is said to range between 120 and 180 feet high, with each tower having its own equipment such as generators, propane tanks, and equipment shelters. The lot size of each tower varies between 2,500 square feet and 25,600 square feet, plus a fence that encompasses up to 10,000 feet. The radio technology of the tower permits the machine to be able to detect movement as far as from a 9.3-mile radius and vehicles from an 18.6 mile radius, while the long-range camera allows for video footage from 13.5 miles away.

In March 2014, in efforts to raise border security, the United States Customs and Border Protection contracted a project with Elbit Systems of America to design and manufacture Integrated Fixed Towers (IFTs) along the Arizona border. The competition for a $145 million contract lasted between major defense contractors such as General Dynamics, Lockheed Martin, and Raytheon. This contract gave Elbit jurisdiction to implement these structures at an unknown number of sites at anonymous locations and the power for both the company and Border Patrol to deeply monitor the border. Originally, it was said that 16 IFTs would be placed along the southern border of Mexico and western border of the Organ Pipe Cactus National Monument. An article published in March 2018 revealed that there are 52 IFTs in place along Arizona's southern border.

Before the implementation of IFTs, the government had been using SBInets. These machines were intended to serve the same purpose as the towers, while also allowing Border Patrol agents to observe information from a common operational picture. But the technology and functionality of SBInets did not meet expectations and costs began to exceed the budget by $1.4 billion. This led to a shift toward IFTs.

The implementation of these towers will aid Border Patrol in monitoring illegal crossings and suspicious activity that occurs near the border. Although the towers would benefit Border Patrol in controlling illegal activities, for the Tohono O'odham nation, the integration of these structures will result in further territorial disputes and invasion of privacy. The rapidly increasing surveillance and security in the borderlands has instilled fear within Indigenous communities. IFTs have begun to interfere with the Tohono O'odham's spiritual rituals and daily routines. Tribes such as the Tohono O'odham may no longer cross the border to visit their families or explore outside their homes without risking scrutiny by agents. Even with set boundaries and size guidelines for the towers, the IFTs have exceeded the established range and are beginning to occupy parts of O'odham territory. Moreover, the growing number of towers has brought increased numbers of Border Patrol agents: 1,500 positioned in three districts that control the reservation.

=== 2026 border wall ===
The Tohono O'odham Nation filed a lawsuit (TOHONO O'ODHAM NATION v. MULLIN et al) in the United States District Court for the District of Columbia on June 16, 2026 to oppose the building of the border wall on their reservation. The border wall would essentially cut off legal access granted to the tribe to visit relatives still in Mexico. The first round of arguments opposing the wall were heard on July 22, 2026, and legal defense for the Nation argued that implementing a border wall on the reservation would be an act of trespass on the Nation's lands and violate the Nation's exclusive rights. In August 2026, the Nation said that federal agents and contractors had illegally entered tribal lands to begin work on the wall.

== Administration ==
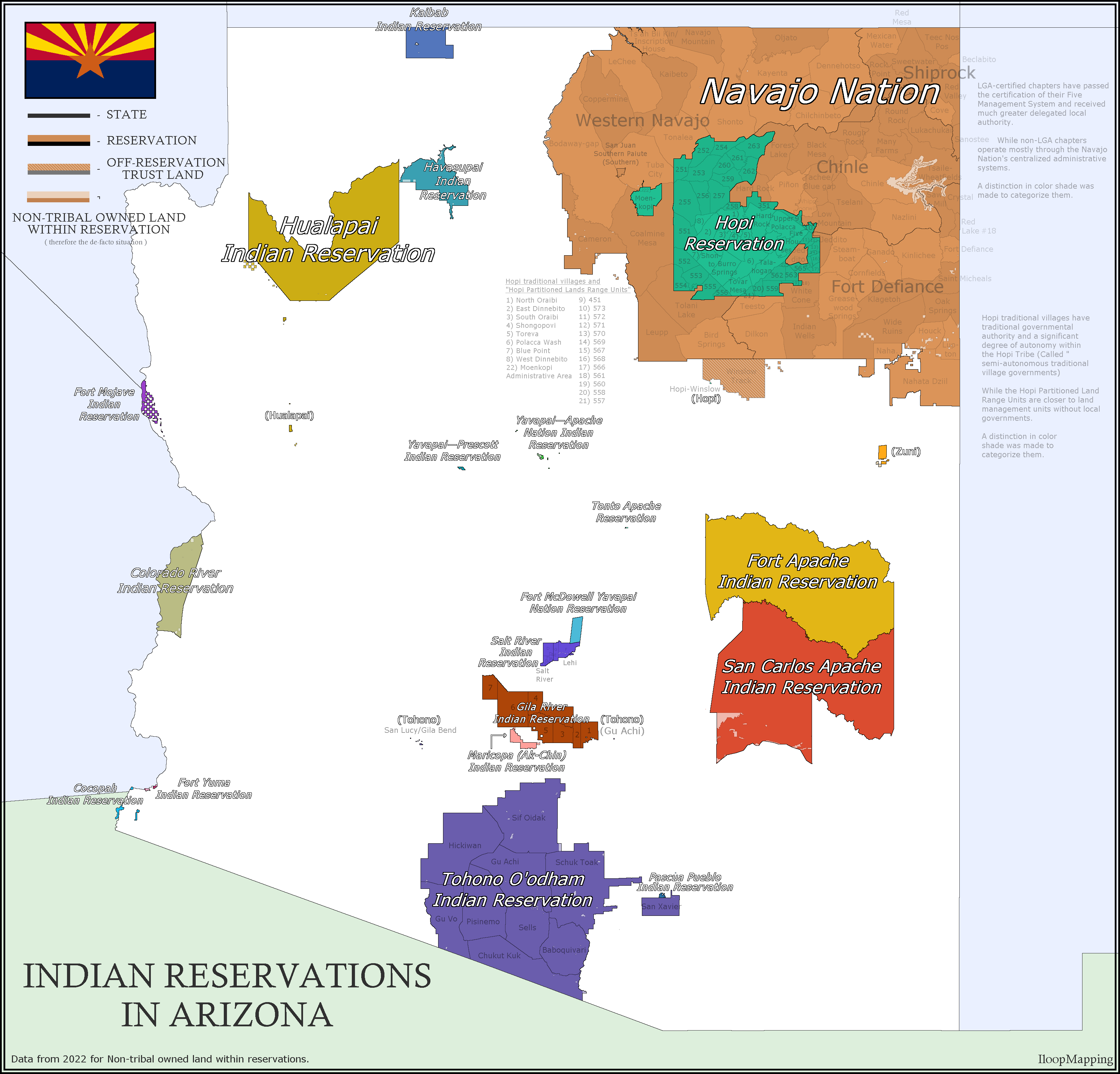
Map of Tohono Oʼodham Nation and neighboring tribes

The Nation is organized into 11 local districts. Nine districts are on the Tohono O'odham Indian Reservation with the Gila Bend and San Xavier reservations, which are separated from the main reserve, making up the other two.

The Tohono O'odham Nation's government has three branches: executive, judicial, and legislative. The executive includes the chairmen and vice chairmen of the 11 districts, the judicial comprises the judges and courts, and the legislative consists of tribal council representatives from each administrative district. As a whole, the Tohono O'odham Nation is governed by a democratically elected chairperson and legislative council. All the reservations are overseen administratively by a central government in Sells. As of 2023, the Nation's chair is Verlon Jose and the vice chair is Carla Johnson. The chief justice is Violet Lui-Frank, and the legislative chair is Timothy Joaquin Gu Achi.

The Tohono O'odham Nation operates its own educational system, which includes Tohono O'odham Community College, a fire department, several recreation centers, a health center, a nursing home, and a public utilities company.

== Economy ==
Economic support for the tribe comes from a variety of sources. Some Tohono O'odham still farm or engage in subsistence ranching. The tribe sells and leases copper mineral rights. The four casinos the tribe operates have become its major source of revenue and jobs. The tribe operates the Tohono O'odham Utility Authority, a tribal firm established in 1970 to provide electric and water service to the reservation. Basket weaving remains an economic pursuit; the tribe produces more basketry than any other tribe in the United States.

== Bibliography ==
- Native Peoples A to Z: A Reference Guide to Native Peoples of the Western Hemisphere, vol. 8 (2nd ed.), Amer Indian Pubs, 2009, ISBN 978-1878592736
- Fontana, Bernard (1998), A Guide to Contemporary Southwest Indians, Western Natl Parks Assoc, ISBN 978-1877856778
- Griffin-Pierce, Trudy (2000), Native Peoples of the Southwest, UNM Press, ISBN 978-0826319074
- McIntyre, Allan (2008), The Tohono O'odham and Pimeria Alta, Arcadia Publishing, ISBN 9780738556338
- Mizutani, Yuka (2013), "Indigenous Peoples and the Borders on the North American Continent", in Ross, Jeffrey (ed.), American Indians at Risk, Santa Barbara: ABC-CLIO, pp. 169–186, ISBN 978-0-88920-508-6
- Pritzker, Barry (2000), A Native American Encyclopedia: History, Culture, and Peoples, Oxford University Press, ISBN 978-0195138771
- Stanley, Sam (1978), American Indian Economic Development, Walter de Gruyter, ISBN 978-9027976000
