= Celtic cross =

Christian cross superimposed on a circle

A Celtic cross symbol

The Celtic cross is a form of ringed cross, a Christian cross featuring a nimbus or ring, that emerged in Ireland and Britain in the Early Middle Ages. It became widespread through its use in the high crosses erected across Ireland, Britain and parts of France, especially in regions evangelised by Irish missionaries, from the 9th through the 12th centuries.

A staple of Insular art, the Celtic cross is essentially a Latin cross with a nimbus surrounding the intersection of the arms and stem. Scholars have debated its exact origins, but it is related to earlier crosses featuring rings. The form gained new popularity during the Celtic Revival of the 19th century; the name "Celtic cross" is a convention dating from that time. The shape, usually decorated with interlace and other motifs from Insular art, became popular for funerary monuments and other uses, and has remained so, spreading well beyond Ireland.

== Early history ==
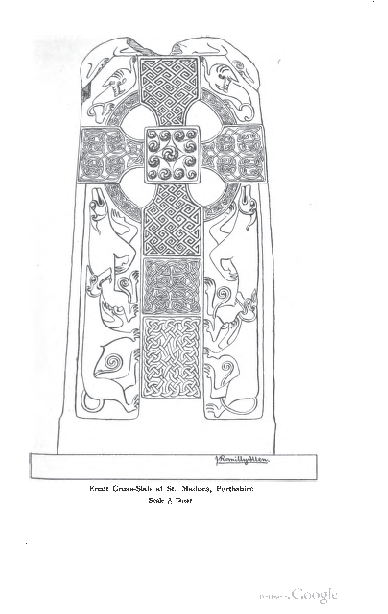
Early forms: cross slab, St. Madoes, Perthshire, Scotland

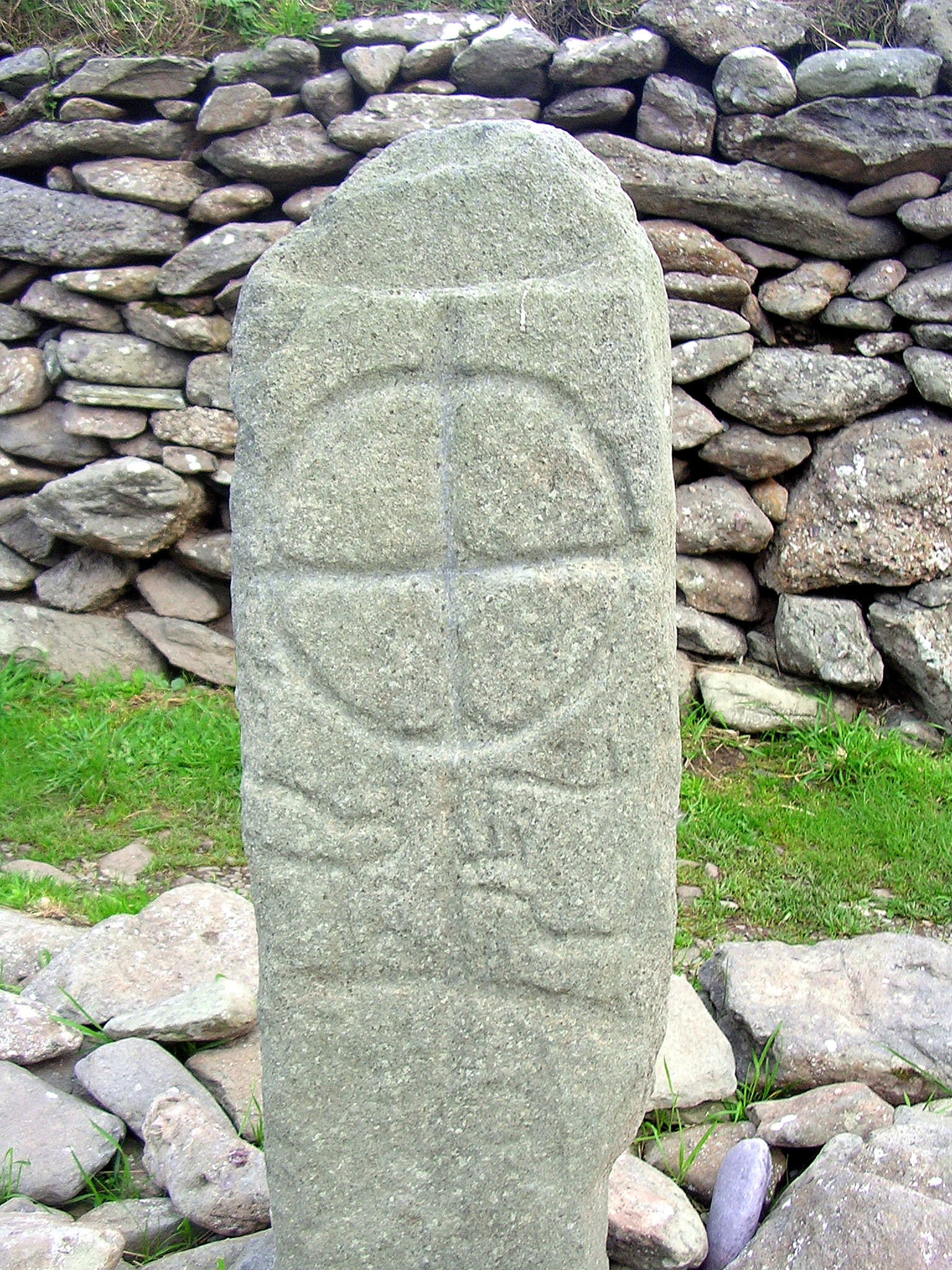
Early forms: pillar stone, Gallarus Oratory, County Kerry, Ireland

Ringed crosses similar to older Continental forms appeared in Ireland, Wales, England, and Scotland in incised stone slab artwork and artifacts like the Ardagh chalice. However, the shape achieved its greatest popularity by its use in the monumental stone high crosses, a distinctive and widespread form of Insular art. These monuments, which first appeared in the ninth century, usually (though not always) take the form of a ringed cross on a stepped or pyramidal base. The form has obvious structural advantages, reducing the length of unsupported side arms. There are a number of theories as to its origin in Ireland and Britain. Some scholars consider the ring a holdover from earlier wooden crosses, which may have required struts to support the crossarm. Others have seen it as deriving from indigenous Bronze Age art featuring a wheel or disc around a head. However, Michael W. Herren, Shirley Ann Brown, and others believe it originates in earlier ringed crosses in Christian art. Crosses with a ring representing the celestial sphere developed from the writings of the Church Fathers. The "cosmological cross" is an important motif in Coelius Sedulius's poem Carmen Paschale, known in Ireland by the seventh century.

It is not clear where the first high crosses originated. The first examples date to about the ninth century and occur in two groups: at Ahenny in Ireland, and at Iona, an Irish monastery off the Scottish coast. The Ahenny group is generally earlier. However, it is possible that St. Johns Cross at Iona was the first high cross; Iona's influence as a center of pilgrimage may have led this cross to inspire the Ahenny group as well as other ringed crosses in Pictish stones.

A variety of crosses bear inscriptions in ogham, an early medieval Irish alphabet. Standing crosses in Ireland and areas under Irish influence tend to be shorter and more massive than their Anglo-Saxon equivalents. Irish examples with a head in cross form include the Cross of Kells, Ardboe High Cross, the crosses at Monasterboice, the Cross of the Scriptures, Clonmacnoise and those in Scotland at Iona and the Kildalton Cross, which may be the earliest to survive in good condition. Surviving, free-standing crosses are in Cornwall, including St Piran's cross at Perranporth, and Wales. Other stone crosses are found in the former Northumbria and Scotland, and further south in England, where they merge with the similar Anglo-Saxon cross making tradition, in the Ruthwell Cross for example. Many examples in Britain were destroyed during the Protestant Reformation. By about A.D. 1200 the initial wave of cross building came to an end in Ireland.

Popular legend in Ireland says that the Christian cross was introduced by Saint Patrick or possibly Saint Declan, though there are no examples from this early period. It has often been claimed that Patrick combined the symbol of Christianity with the sun cross to give pagan followers an idea of the importance of the cross. By linking it with the idea of the life-giving properties of the sun, these two ideas were linked to appeal to pagans. Other interpretations claim that placing the cross on top of the circle represents Christ's supremacy over the pagan sun.

=== Notable high crosses with the Celtic shape in Ireland ===
- Ahenny, County Tipperary
- Ardboe County Tyrone
- Carndonagh high cross, County Donegal
- Drumcliff, County Sligo
- Dysert O'Dea Monastery, County Clare
- Glendalough County Wicklow St. Kevin's Cross
- Killamery, County Kilkenny
- Kloster Fahan Fahan, County Donegal
- Monasterboice, County Louth
- Clonmacnoise Cross of the Scriptures, County Offaly
- Moone, County Kildare

=== Notable high crosses with the Celtic shape in Scotland ===
- Campbeltown Cross
- Iona Abbey Crosses
- Inchbraoch Cross
- Kildalton Cross
- Massacre of Glencoe Monument
- Meigle 1 Cross
- St. Martin's Cross at Iona Abbey
- St Gordian's Kirk Cross
- Govan Old Parish Church Cross
- Weem, Aberfeldy
- Ruthwell Cross
- Gosforth Cross
- Bewcastle_Cross

=== Notable Celtic crosses in India ===
- Mateer Memorial Church, Kerala, India

=== Celtic cross monument gallery ===
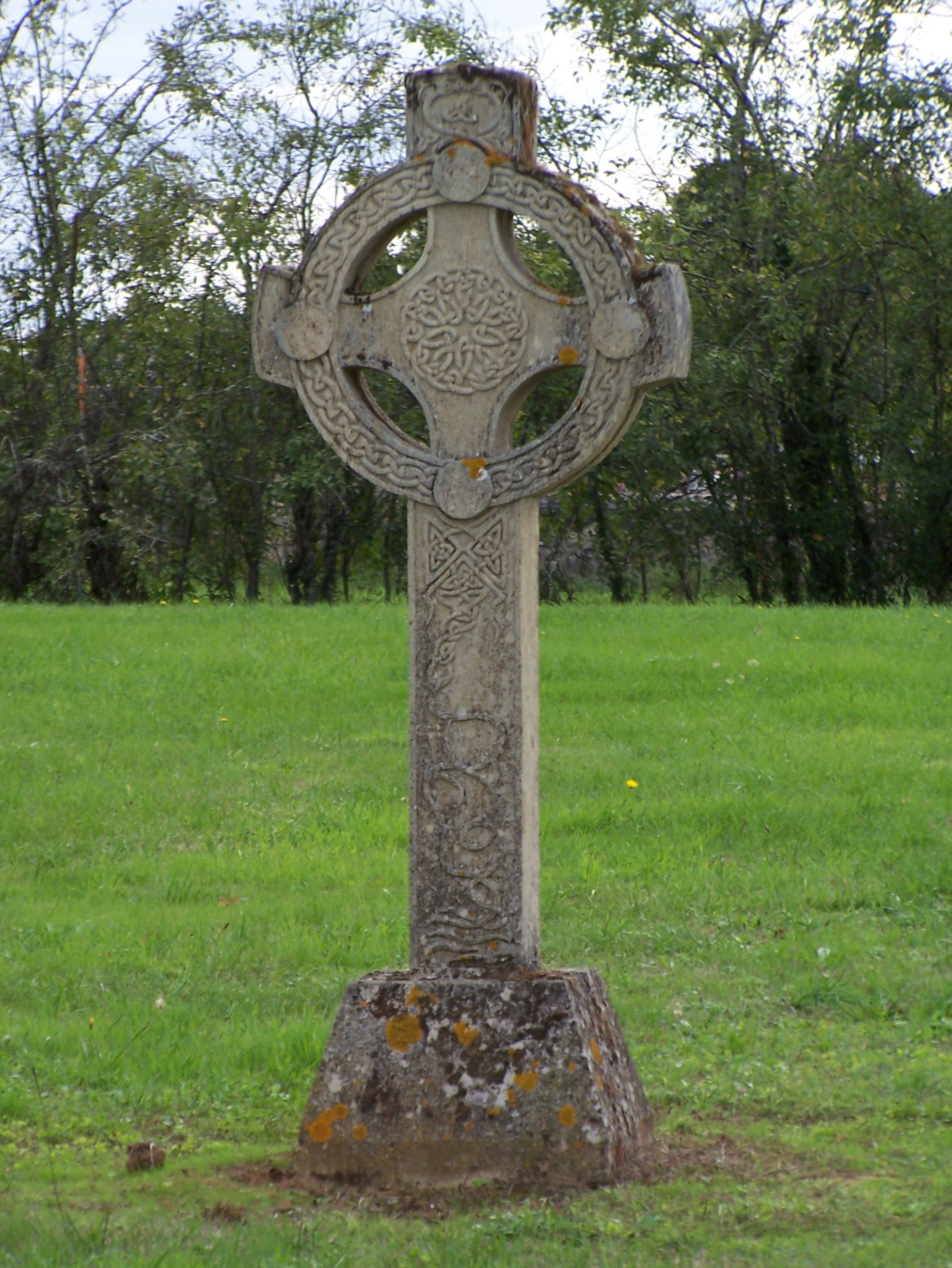
Celtic cross of Lugasson, France

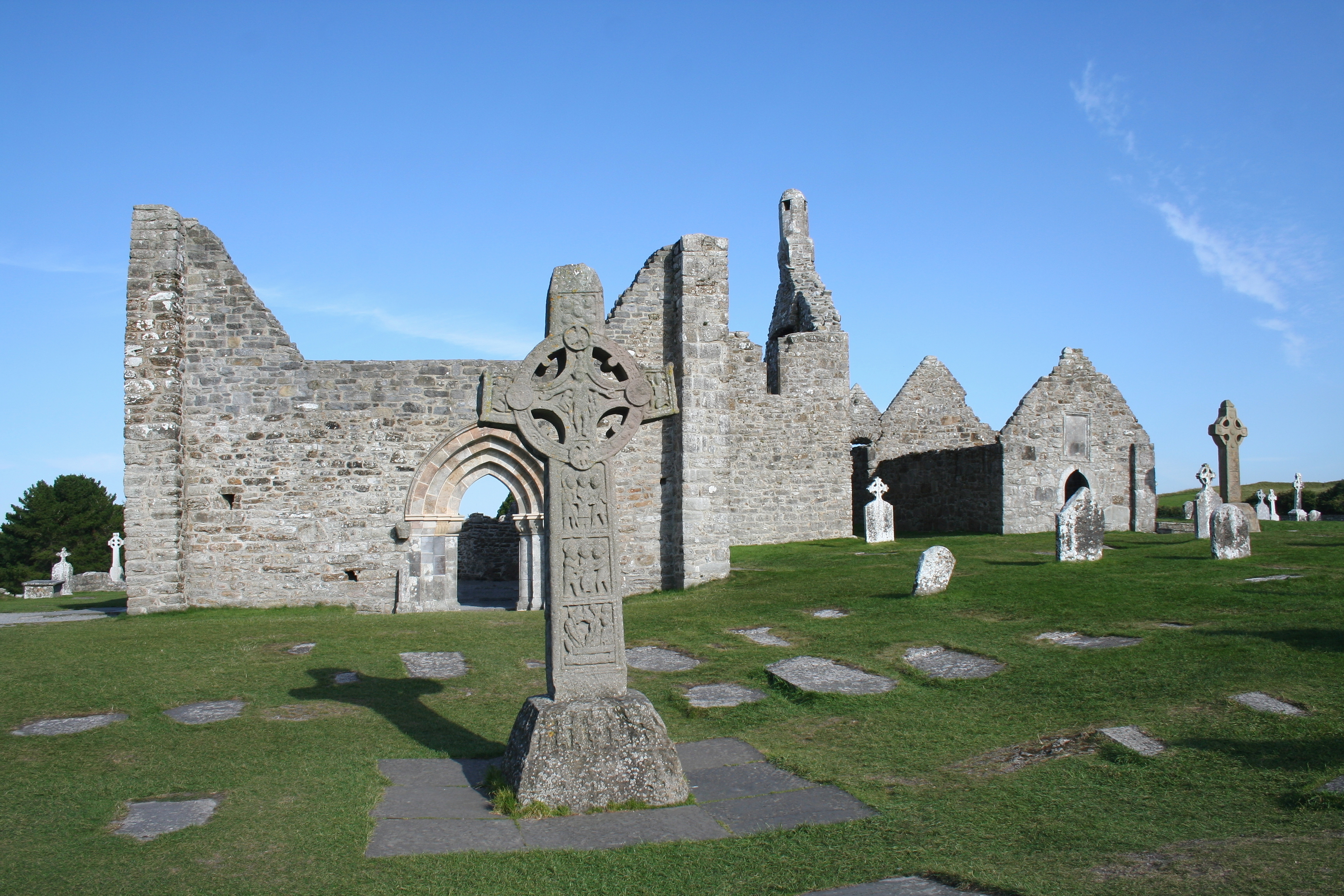
Early crosses at Clonmacnoise, Ireland

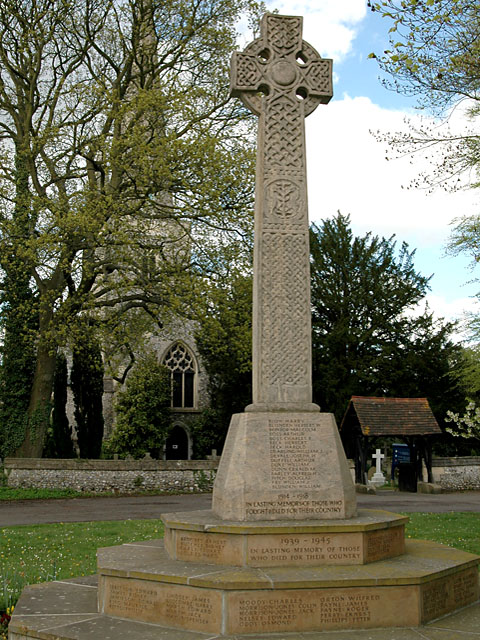
Kingswood war memorial in Surrey, England

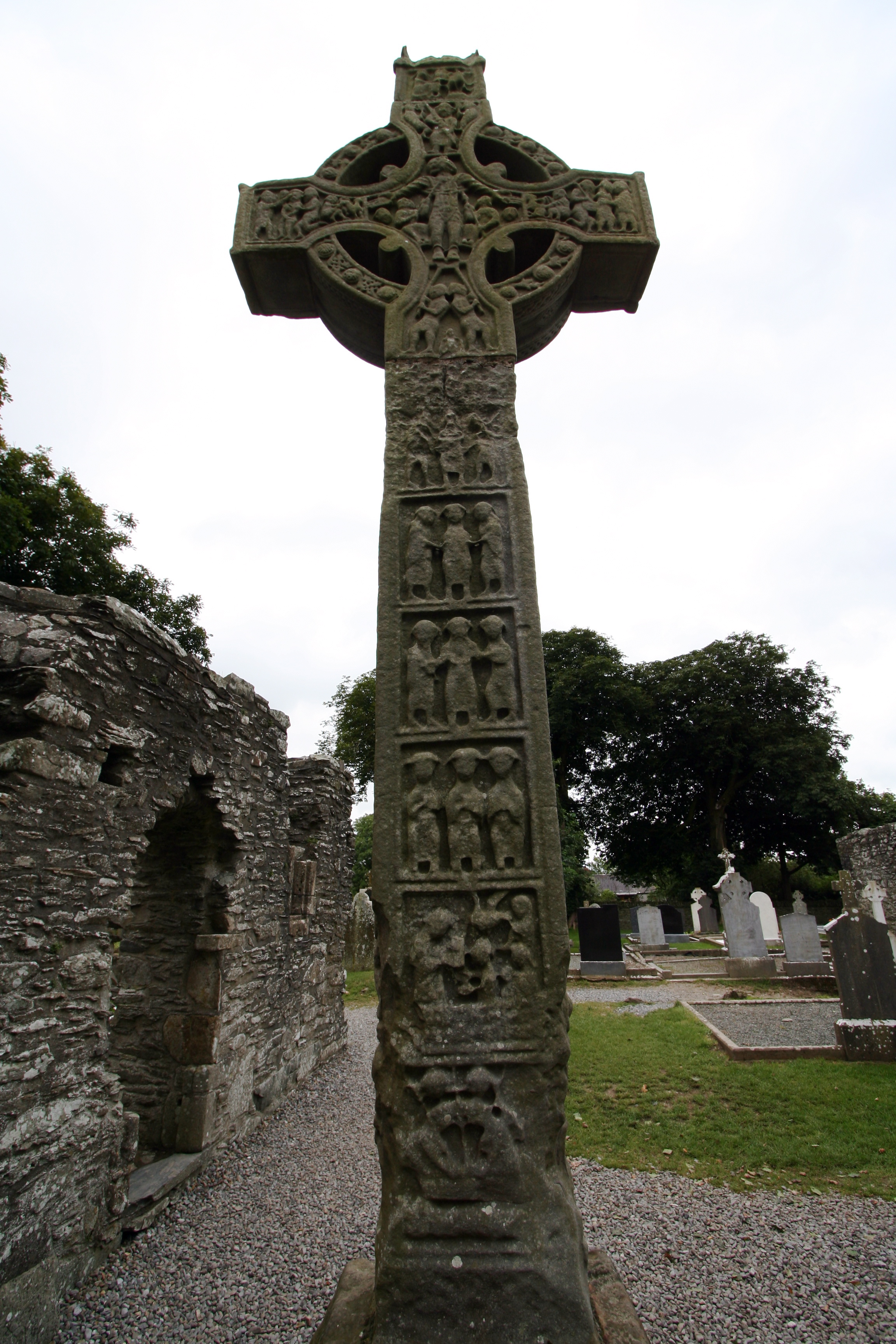
A high cross at Monasterboice, Ireland

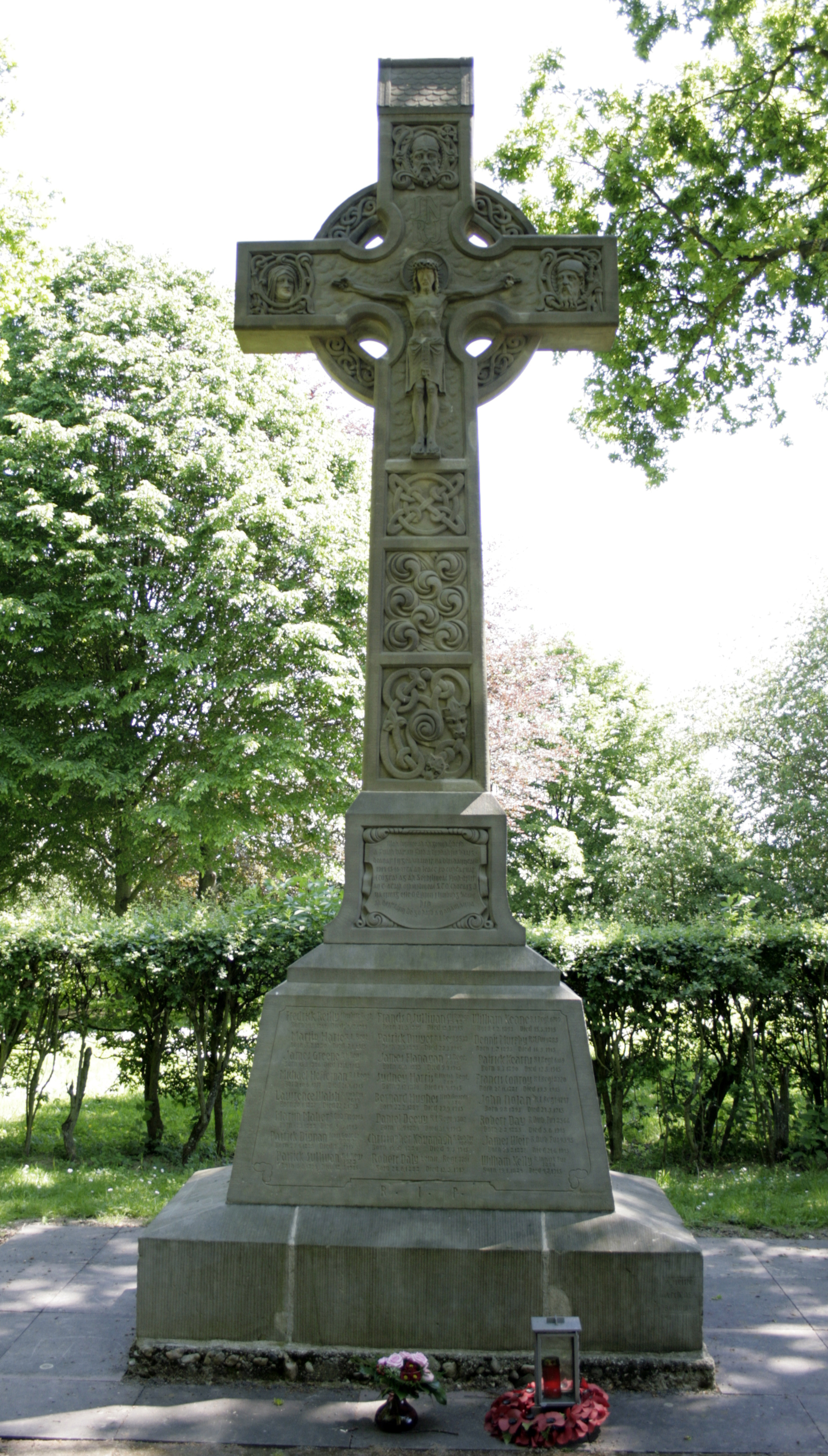
Modern Celtic cross of a war monument in Limburg-Dietkirchen, Germany

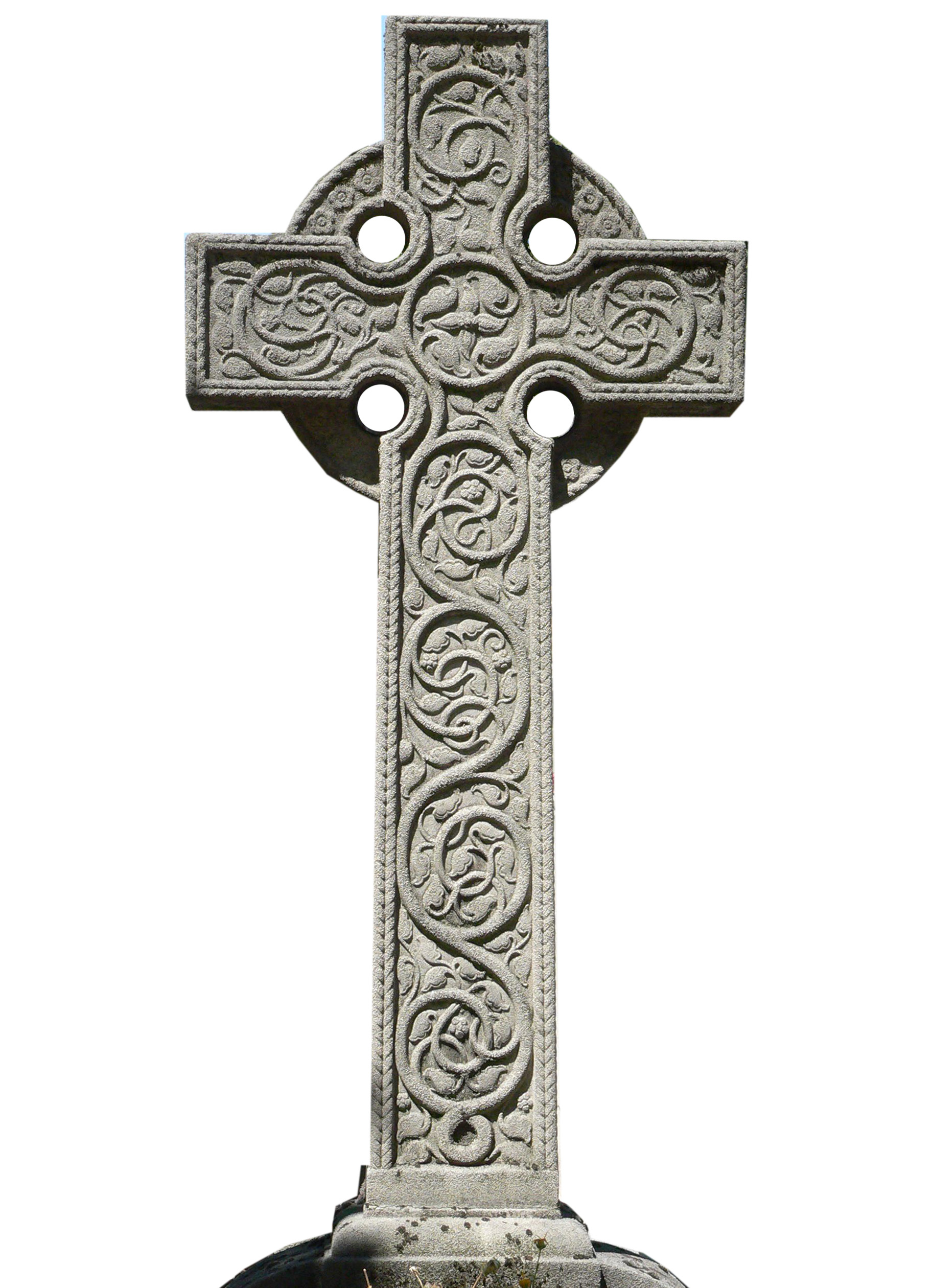
Modern Celtic cross at Cimetière du Père-Lachaise, Paris

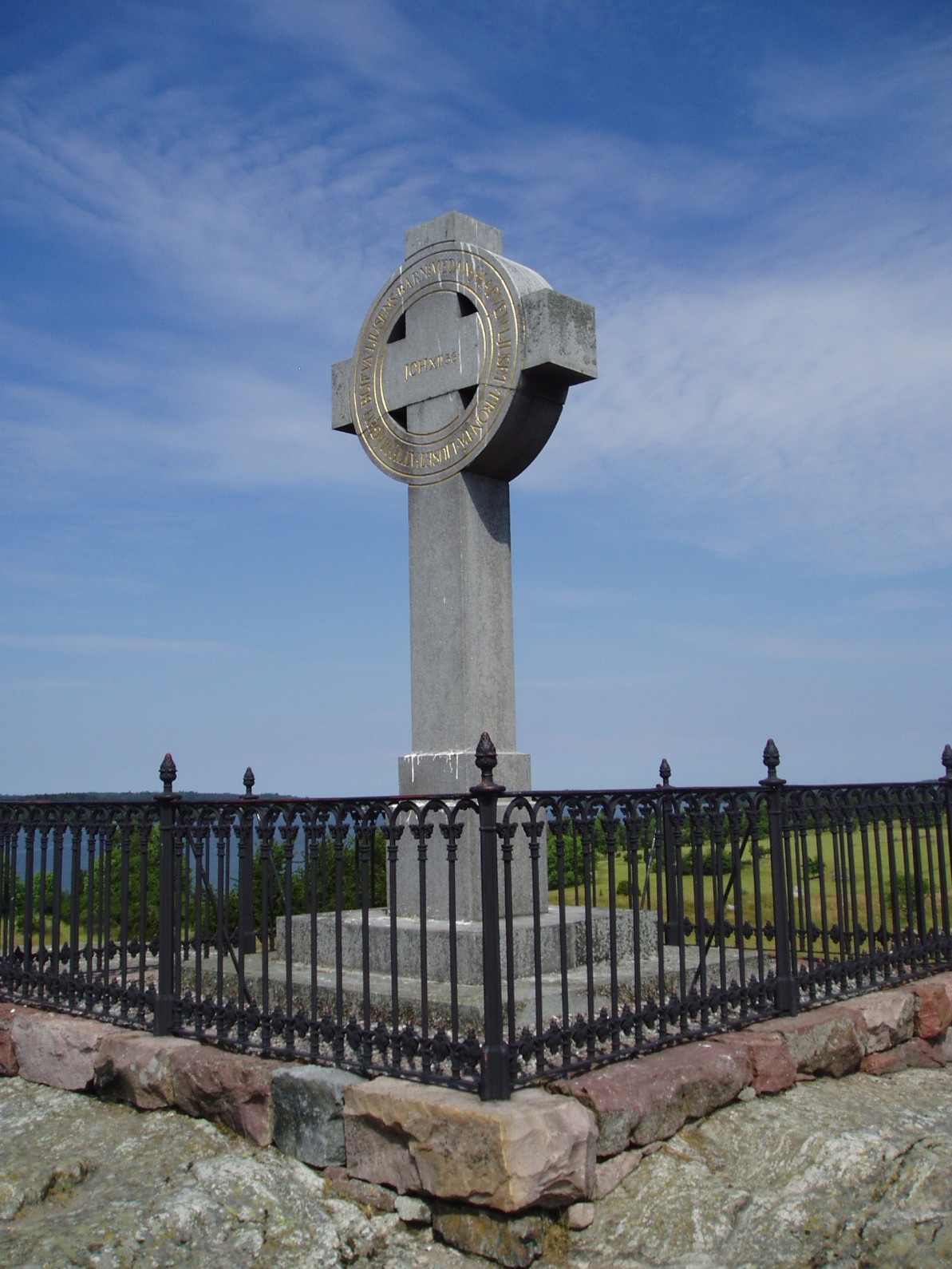
Ansgars Cross (to Ansgar), Birka, Sweden

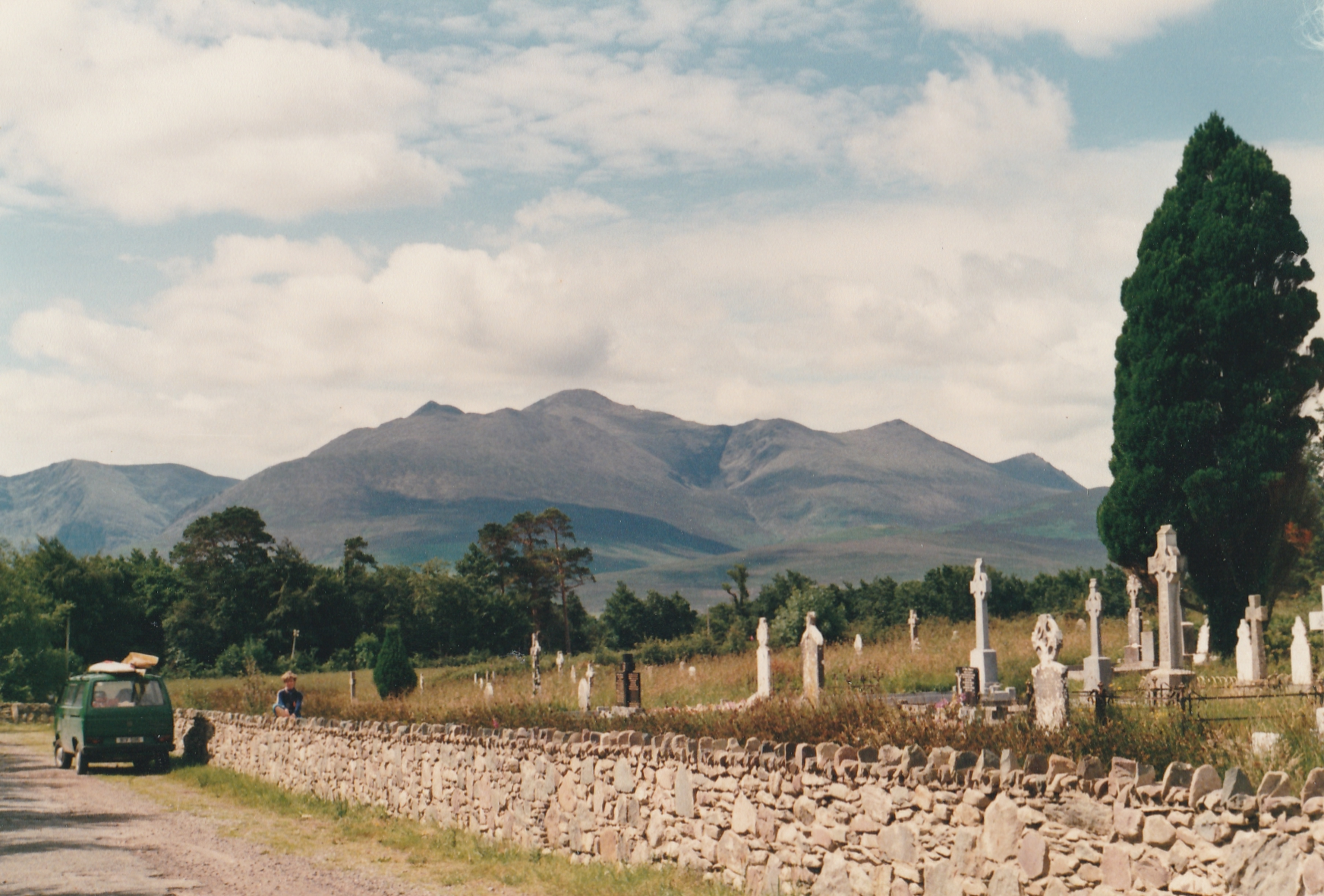
Celtic crosses in a cemetery near Beaufort, County Kerry, Ireland

== Modern times ==
=== Celtic Revival ===
The Celtic Revival of the mid-19th century led to an increased use and creation of Celtic crosses in Ireland. In 1853, casts of several historical high crosses were exhibited at the Dublin Industrial Exhibition. In 1857, Henry O'Neill published Illustrations of the Most Interesting of the Sculptured Crosses of Ancient Ireland. These two events stimulated interest in the Celtic cross as a symbol for a renewed sense of heritage within Ireland.

New versions of the high cross were designed for fashionable cemetery monuments in Victorian Dublin in the 1860s. From Dublin, the revival spread to the rest of the country and beyond. Since the Celtic Revival, the ringed cross became an emblem of Celtic identity, in addition to its more traditional religious symbolism.

Modern interest in the symbol increased because of Alexander and Euphemia Ritchie. The two worked on the island of Iona in Scotland from 1899 to 1940 and popularised use of the Celtic cross in jewelry. Since its revival in the 1850s, the Celtic cross has been used extensively as grave markers, straying from medieval usage, when the symbol was typically used for a public monument. The Celtic cross now appears in various retail items. Both the Gaelic Athletic Association and the Northern Ireland national football team have used versions of the Celtic cross in their logos and advertising. The Church in Wales since 1954 have used a flag with a Celtic cross in the centre.

==== Gallery ====
Flag of the Church in Wales

Flag of the Isle of Skye

Flag of Staining, Lancashire

Flag of Irish Heritage Quebec

Flag of Rathmines and Rathgar Urban District Council (1929–1930)

Flag of the 31st International Eucharistic Congress (1932)

Flag of Bleimor (c.1946–1962)

Proposed flag of Ireland (1951)

United States Department of Veterans Affairs headstone emblem 41

United States Department of Veterans Affairs headstone emblem 46

Proposed flag of Cumbria (2025)

First logo of Celtic F.C., used from 1888 to 1889

=== White supremacist symbolism ===
White nationalist Celtic cross

Versions of ringed crosses such as the Celtic cross and the Odin's cross are used as a symbol by white supremacists. The Odin's cross or sun cross was used by Nazis in Norway in the 1930s and 1940s; more recently, the Celtic cross has been used by neo-Nazis, Klansmen, and other white supremacist groups. In general, white supremacists use a version of the symbol with a square cross as opposed to the traditional elongated cross. This symbol forms part of the logo of Stormfront.

It is suggested that adoption of the symbol in the context of right-wing politics is linked with the activity of Jesuit priest Paul Doncœur, a prominent figure of the interwar scout movement in France. In 1924, the victory of anti-clerical Cartel des Gauches in general elections caused the mobilisation of right-wing forces, with Doncœur playing a major role in formation of Fédération Nationale Catholique and Ligue DRAC. The same year, impressed by Quickborn, a Catholic organisation within the German Youth Movement, he founded its local equivalent, Cadets. Doncœur, inspired by the G. K. Chesterton's novel The Ball and the Cross, decided that the symbol of the movement, croix cadet, should consist of a circle, representing the material world, supported by a square Christian cross intersecting it.

After the Fall of France, Vichy government relied on pre-existing organisations to implement its youth policy according to the principles of the National Revolution. The field was dominated by Catholic scout movements, the leaders of which were put in charge of Secretariat-General of Youth. In 1941, the symbol of Doncœur, now named croix celtique, was adopted as an emblem for Cadets of the Légion in Algeria, a youth movement within Légion Française des Combattants, a veteran organisation which the government hoped could be transformed to function as the single party of the state. Then it was used as insignia of Equipes nationales, a youth civilian service institution founded in 1942. After the war, Pierre Sidos appropriated the symbol as an emblem of the far-right movement Jeune Nation, founded by him in 1949.

White supremacist use of the long and short Celtic cross represents only a small minority of the symbol's use. The symbol in both forms is used by non-extremists in contexts such as Christianity, heritage celebration, neo-Paganism, and Irish patriotism. Furthermore, according to the American Anti-Defamation League, the cross itself does not denote white supremacy.

==== Gallery ====
A Celtic cross flag used by white supremacists

Neo-Nazi Celtic cross flag

White Pride World Wide symbol, logo of Stormfront

National-anarchist star

Alternative flag of Serbian Action

=== Unicode ===
The code point for this symbol in Unicode is U+1F548 🕈 CELTIC CROSS.

== See also ==
- Armenian eternity sign – Ancient Armenian national symbol
- Basalt cross – Type of Christian stone cross found in Germany
- Georgian eternity sign – Georgian symbol of the Sun
- Christian cross variants – Variations on the religious symbol through Christian history
- Conciliation cross – Stone cross set up where a murder or accident happened
- Coptic cross – Cross associated with Coptic Christians
- Forked cross – Y-shaped cross
- High cross – Any free-standing Christian cross made of stone – often richly decorated
- Irminsul – Sacred, pillar-like object in Saxon paganism
- Maltese cross – Heraldic cross
- Maypole – Tall wooden pole erected as a part of various European folk festivals
- Picture stone – Ornate slab of stone from ancient Northern Europe
- Ringed cross – Cross enclosed in a ring or halo
- Rood – Crucifix or other depiction of the Crucifixion
- Shaft cross
- Solar symbol – Symbol representing the Sun
- Stone cross – Type of Christian monument found in Central Europe
- Stone crosses in Cornwall
- Sun cross – Circle containing four or more spokes
- Swastika – Ancient Eurasian icon and Nazi symbol

== Bibliography ==
- J. Romilly Allen: Early Christian Symbolism in Great Britain and Ireland Before the Thirteenth Century. Whiting, London 1887. Neuauflage als The High Crosses of Ireland. Felinfach: Llanerch 1992, ISBN 0-7661-9262-8.
- Peter Harbison: The High Crosses of Ireland. Habelt, Bonn, 3 Baende, 1991.
- Herren, Michael W.; Brown, Shirley Ann (2002). Christ in Celtic Christianity: Britain and Ireland from the Fifth to the Tenth Century. Boydell Press. ISBN 978-0-85115-889-1.
- H. Richardson: An Introduction to Irish High Crosses. 1990, ISBN 0-85342-941-3.
