= Alexander Ritchie =

Alexander Ritchie may refer to:

- Alexander Handyside Ritchie (1804–1870), Scottish sculptor
- Alexander Hay Ritchie (1822–1895), artist and engraver
- Alexander Ritchie (1856–1941), Scottish artist and entrepreneur from Iona
