= Ringed cross =

Cross enclosed in a ring or halo

The ringed cross is a class of Christian cross symbols featuring a ring or nimbus. The concept exists in many variants and dates to early in the history of Christianity. One variant, the cruciform halo, is a special type of halo placed behind the head of Jesus in Christian art. Other common variants include the Celtic cross, used in the stone high crosses of France, Ireland and Britain; some forms of the Coptic cross; and ringed crosses from Galicia.

== History ==
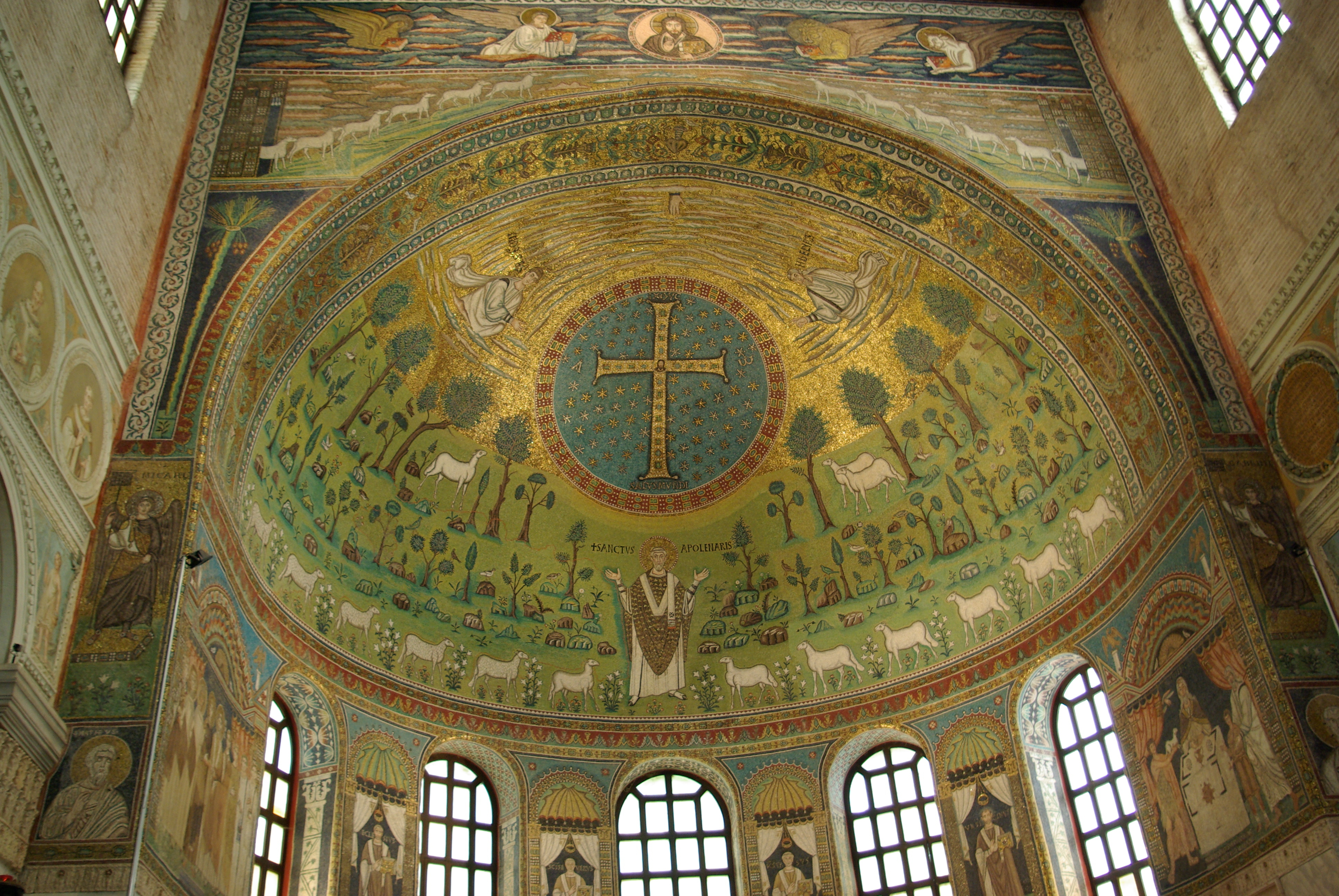
Crux Gemmata at Basilica of Sant'Apollinare in Classe

The nimbus or ringed shape was appended to the Christian cross and other symbols relatively early. In these contexts it apparently derived from the earlier Roman garland of victory. The Chi Rho-in-circle motif was widespread in the Roman Empire by the late 4th century, and garlanded and ringed crosses were popular in imperial Ravenna by the 5th century, influencing the later versions. The cruciform halo or cross halo, a halo incorporating a cross, emerged as a distinctive type of halo painted behind the head of members of the Holy Trinity, especially Jesus, and occasionally others. In other cases, the combination of cross and nimbus symbolized the presence of Christ throughout the cosmos, with the nimbus representing the celestial sphere. Notable early examples include the cosmological ringed cross in the 5th-century Mausoleum of Galla Placidia, and the 6th-century Crux Gemmata in the Basilica of Sant'Apollinare in Classe.

=== Coptic cross ===
Old Coptic crosses often incorporate a circle, as in the form called a "Coptic cross" by Rudolf Koch in his The Book of Signs (1933). Sometimes the arms of the cross extend through the circle (dividing it into four quadrants), as in the "Celtic cross". The circle cross was also used by the early Gnostic sects.

=== Nestorian cross ===
Crosses used by the Church of the East sometimes incorporate a circle, similar to the Celtic cross or a sun cross.

Nestorian crosses
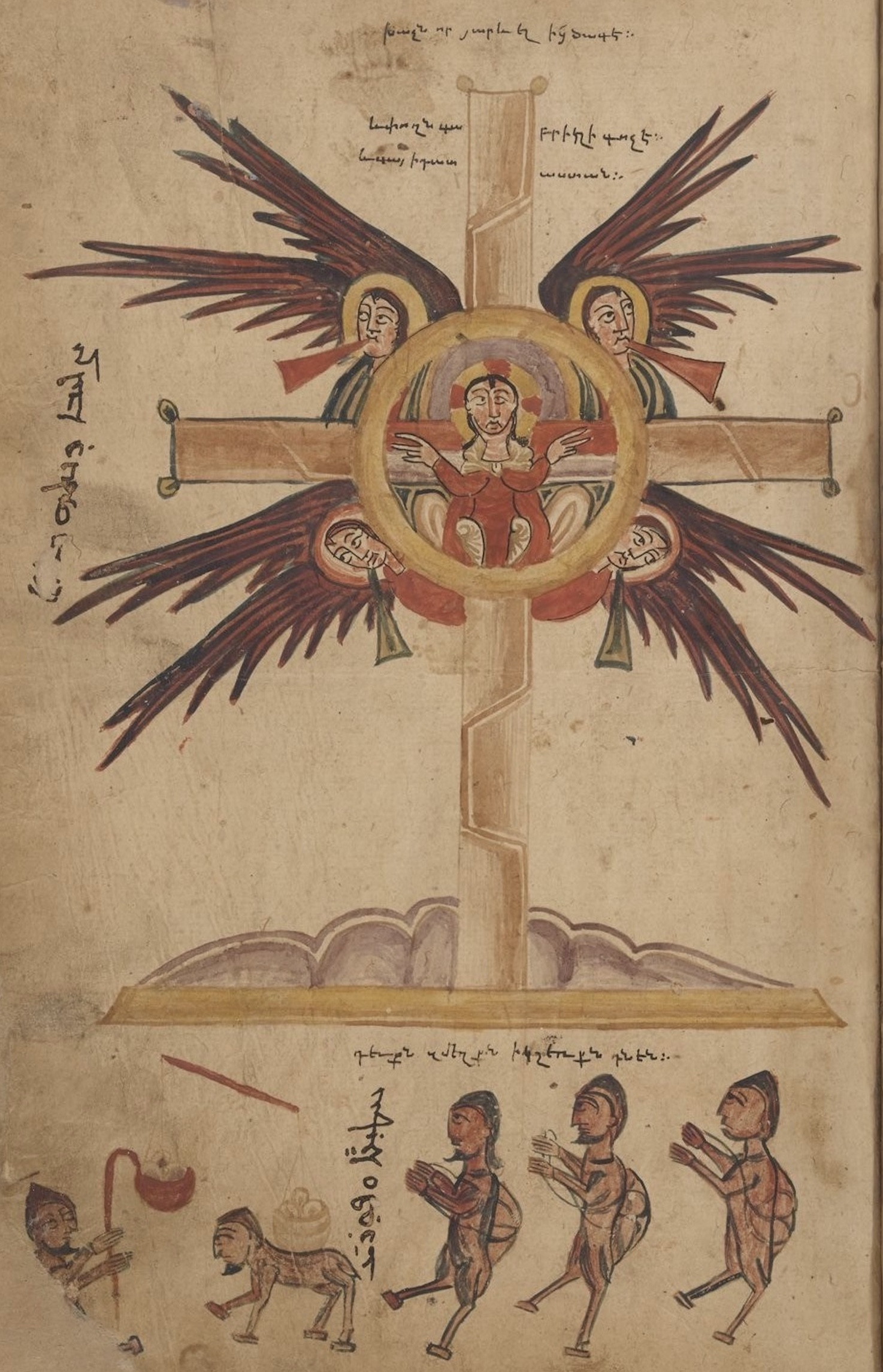
A Celtic-style cross from the Nestorian Evangelion.

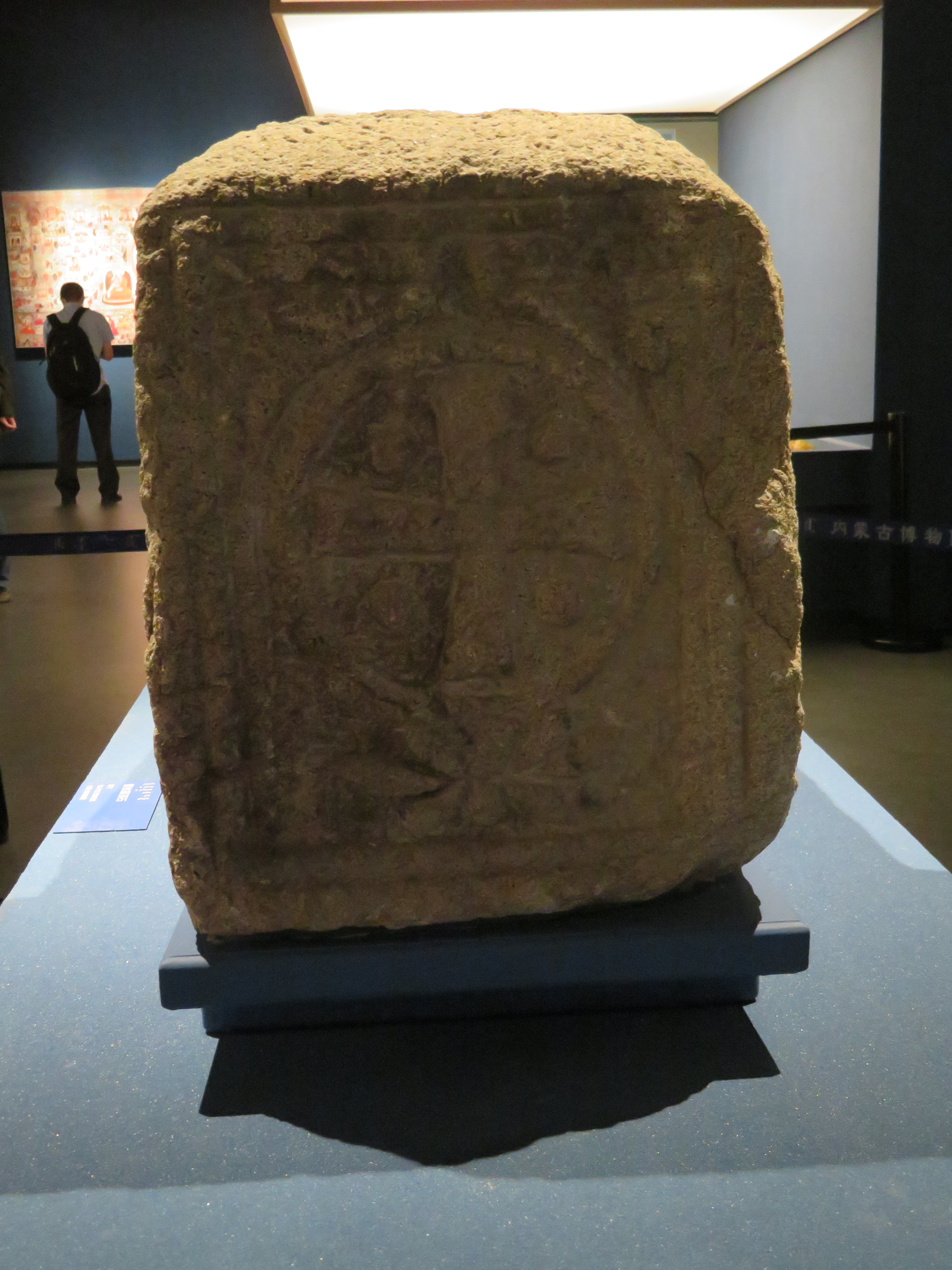
A sun cross carved on a Yuan-dynasty Nestorian tombstone. (Inner Mongolia)

== Symbolic forms ==
Ringed cross symbols
The Celtic cross, a common type of ringed cross

Sun cross (and planet Earth symbol)

A cruciform halo

The original Gnostic/Coptic cross

Cross of Novgorod

Shimazu clan mon (Japan)

== Northern Europe ==
=== Estonia ===
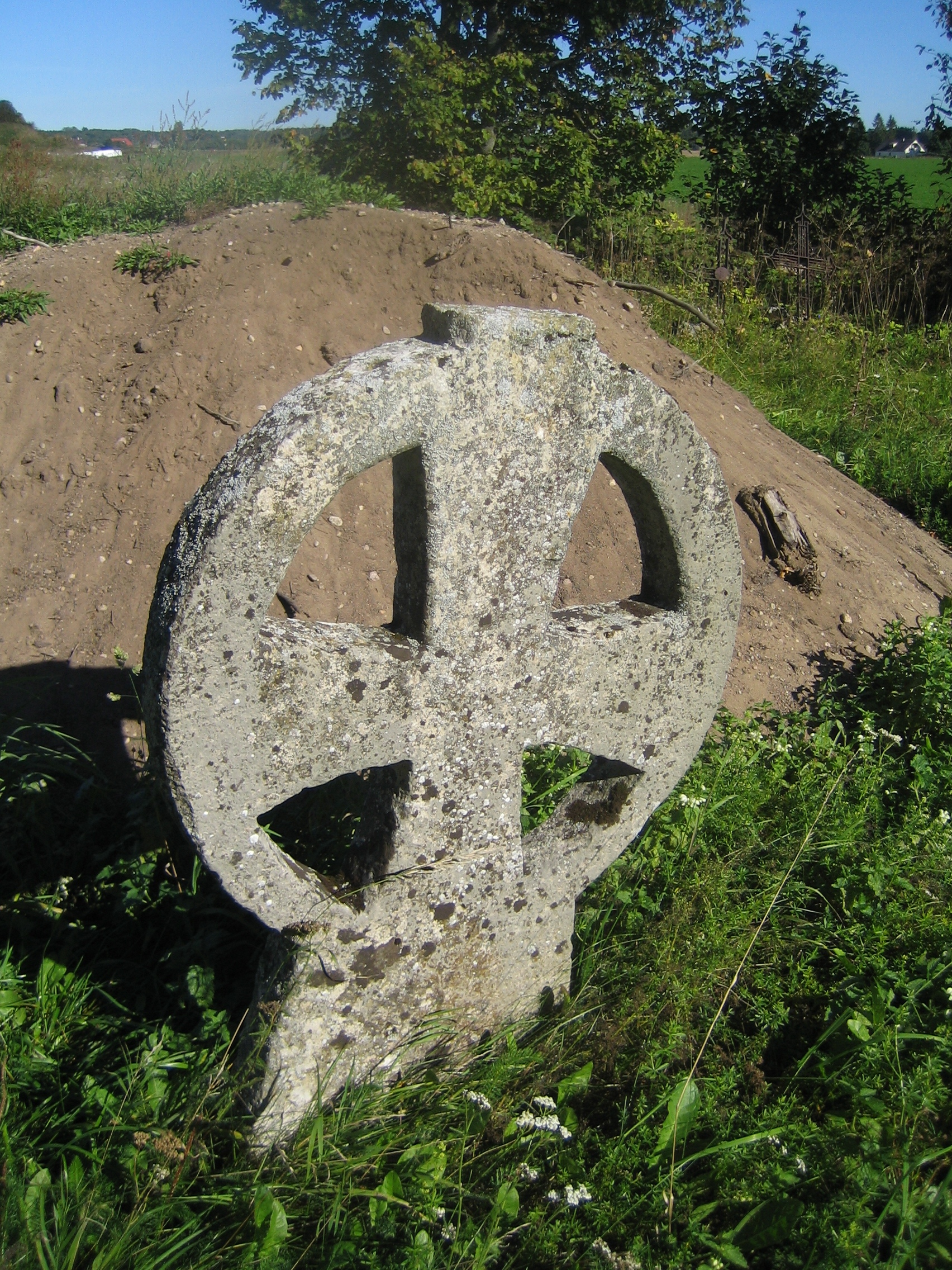
Rõngasrist Saha kabeliaias

There is an example of a circled cross in the cemetery around the 13th-century Saha Chapel in North Estonia. For context, Estonia lies near Gotland (see below), which might have played a role in the cross's creation.

=== Gotland and Isle of Man ===
Ringed crosses are also found on the island of Gotland in Sweden, dating to the Early Middle Ages.

Celtic crosses on Gotland
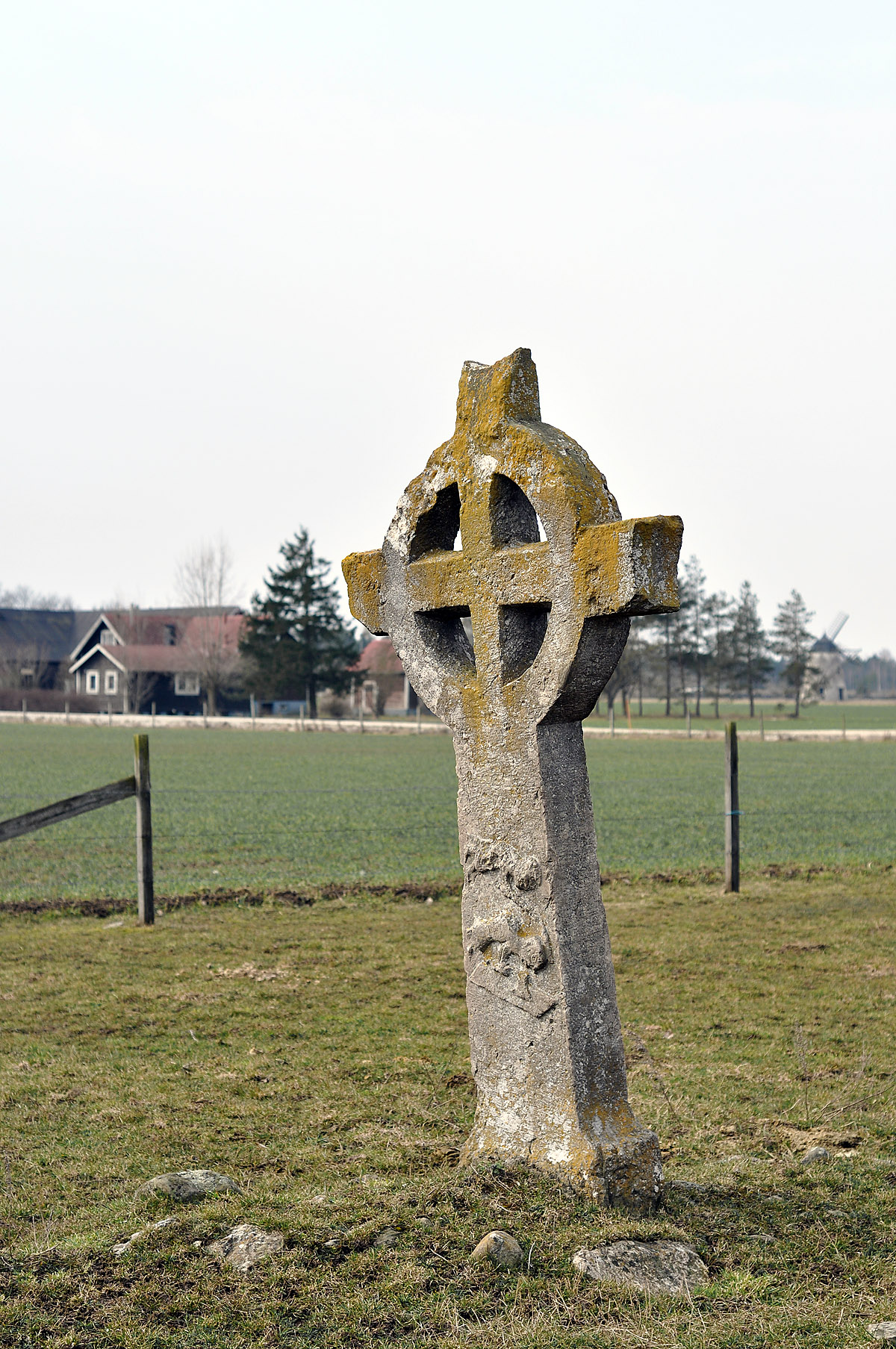
Guldrupe socken, Gotland

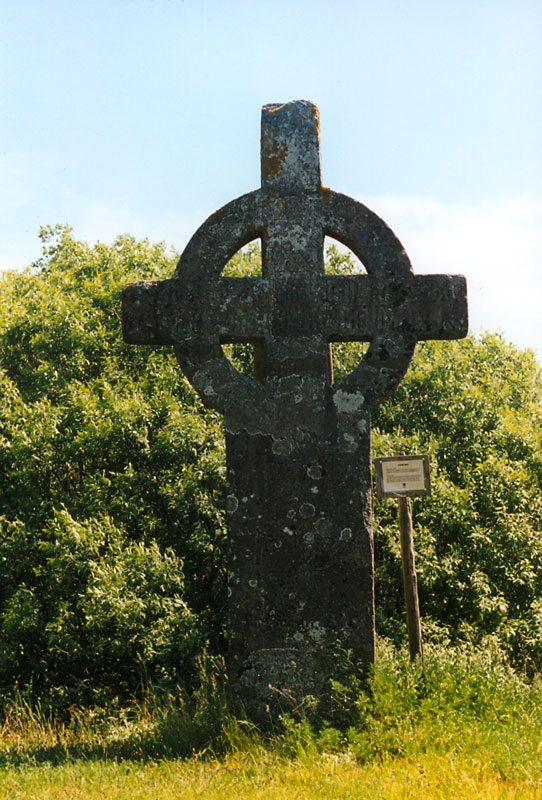
Burs socken, Gotland

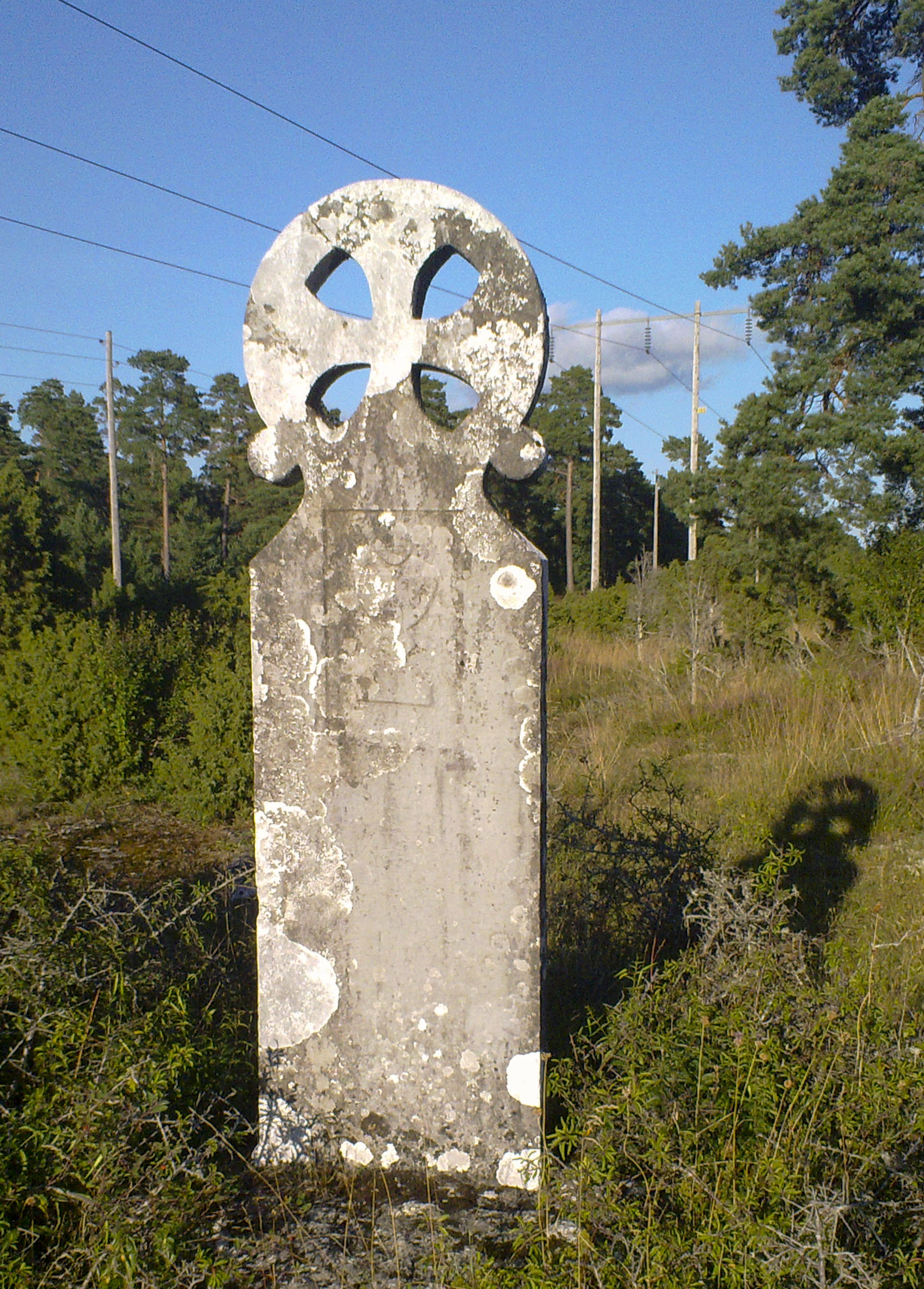
Ringed cross raised by Jörgen i Endre 1336

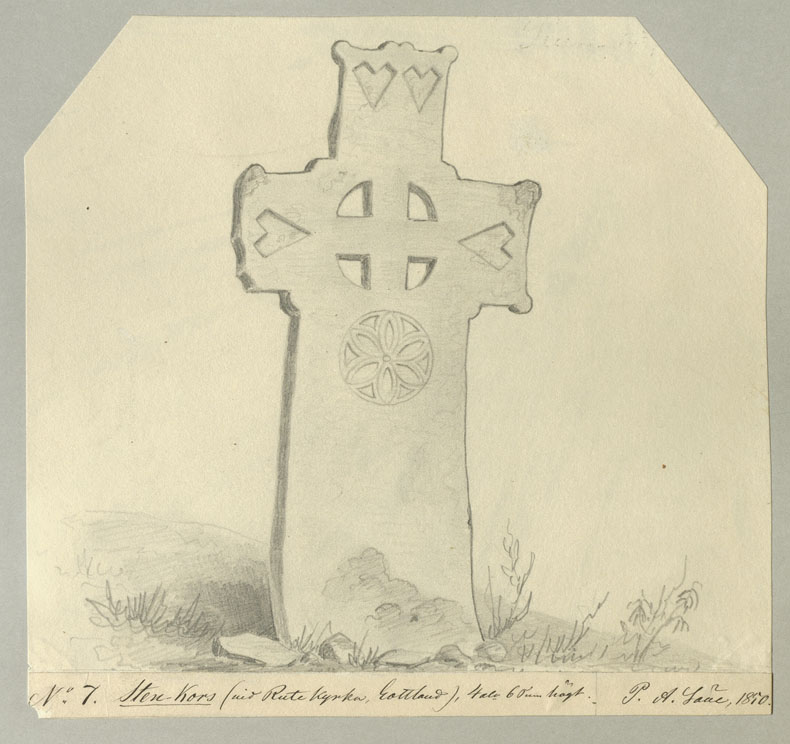
Rute Church ringed cross

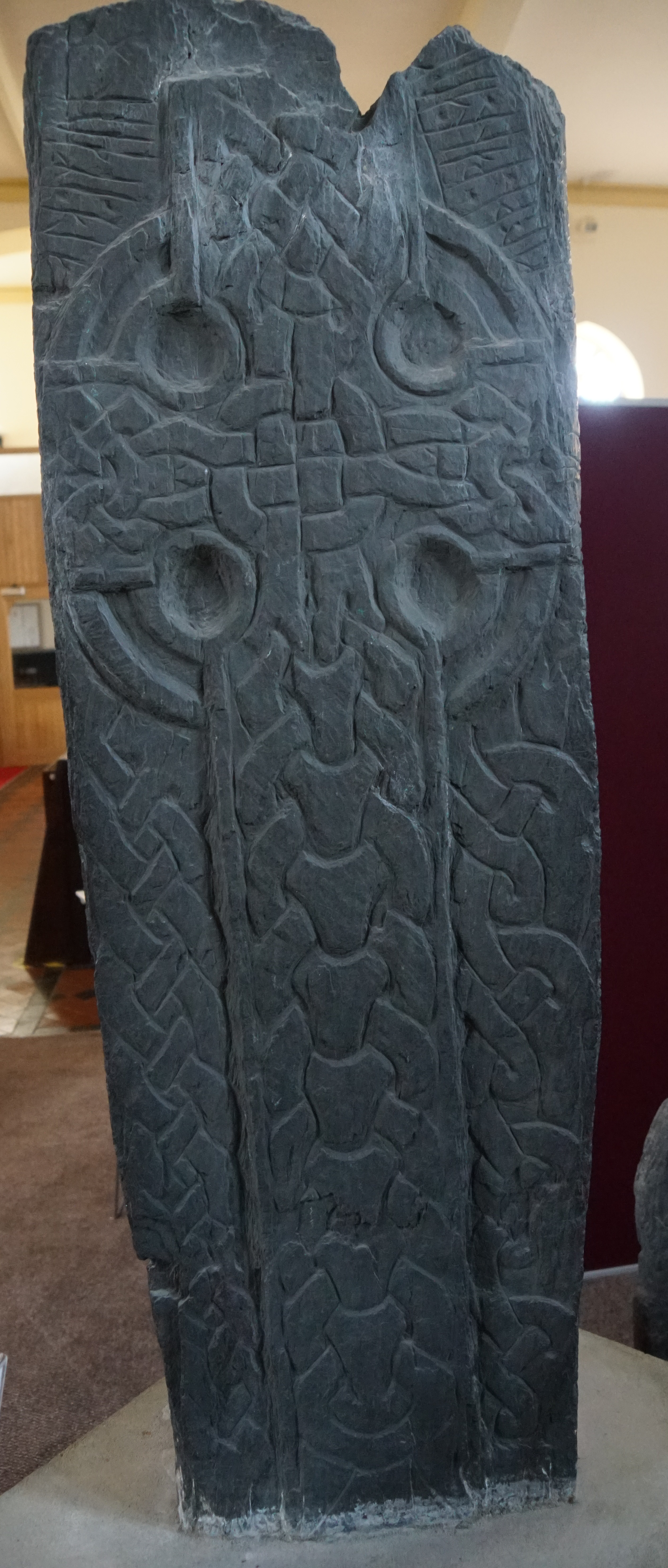
Gaut's Cross Slab (Manx Cross no. 101)

Ringed crosses does not appear elsewhere in Sweden, and how the design came to the island is a mystery. One theory suggest Isle of Man, which has stonecarvings connected to Gotland. One such on Isle of Man is an inscribed carving of a ringed cross, "Gaut's Cross Slab" (Manx Cross no. 101), which was carved by a man named Gaut, believed to be a man from Gotland, where other inscriptions with the name Gaut are found.

The inscription reads in Old Norse:

Mail, Brikti, sunr, Athakans, smith, raisti, krus, thano, fur, salu, sina, sin, bru kuln, Kaut, kirthi, thano, auk ala, I maun.

Translation:

"Mael Bridge, son of Athankan, the smith, erected this cross for his own soul (and that of) his brother's wife. Gaut made this and all in Man".

== Southern Europe ==
=== Galicia ===
A form of ringed cross, similar to Celtic variant and frequently associated to knots and interlaced designs, is found in Galicia in Spain, often topping horreos (granaries) as a protective measure against any kind of evil. They can also be found atop churches and, since the beginning of the 20th century, in cemeteries, but they are unusual in cruceiros (high crosses). There is a very characteristic Galician Medieval style that combines a Celtic cross with a Celtic simple knot; it is similar to the St Maur cross at Glanfeuil Abbey.

Circled crosses in Galicia
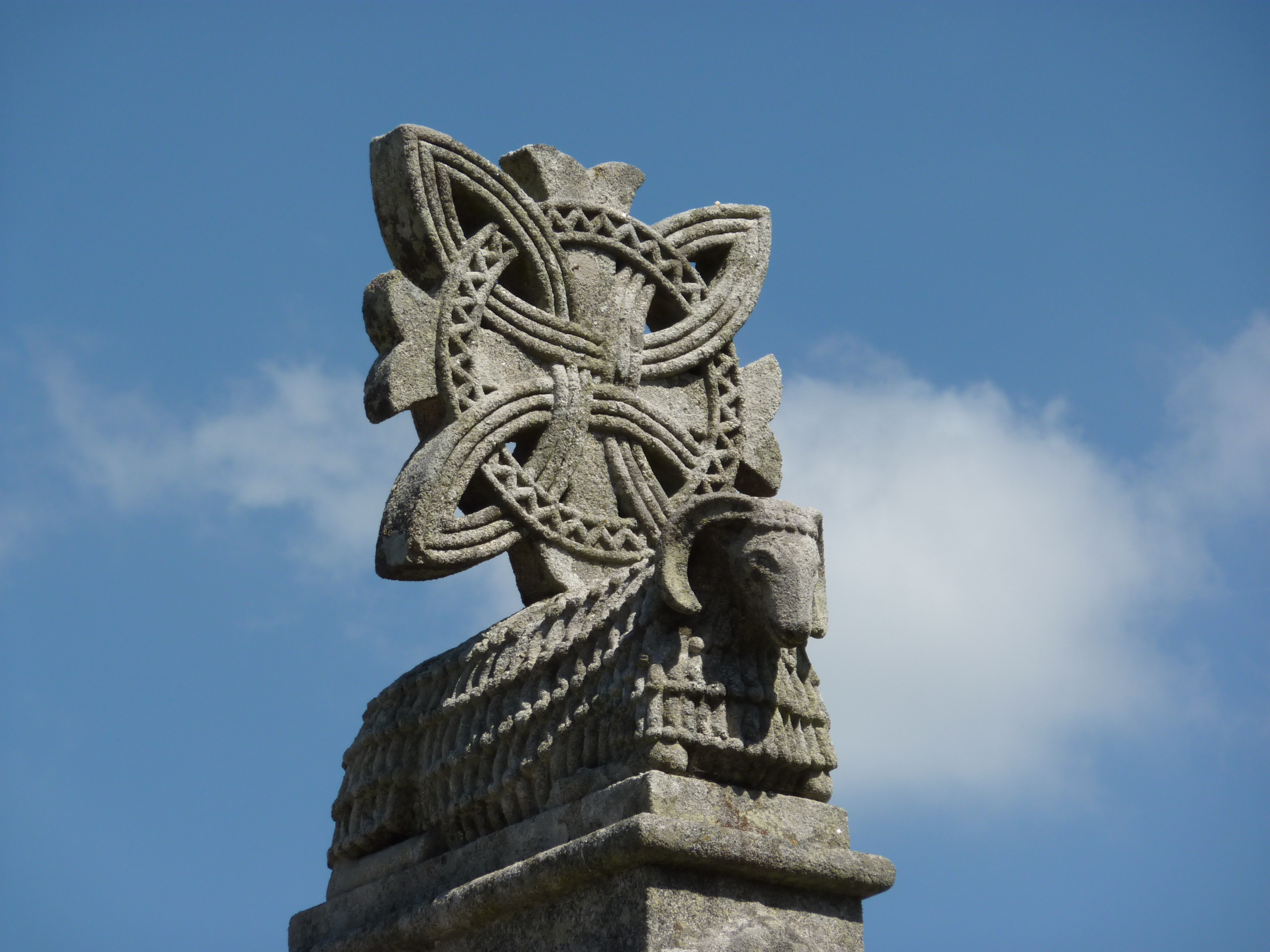
Modern copy of the Romanesque Agnus Dei topping the church of Saint Mary Salome, in Santiago de Compostela

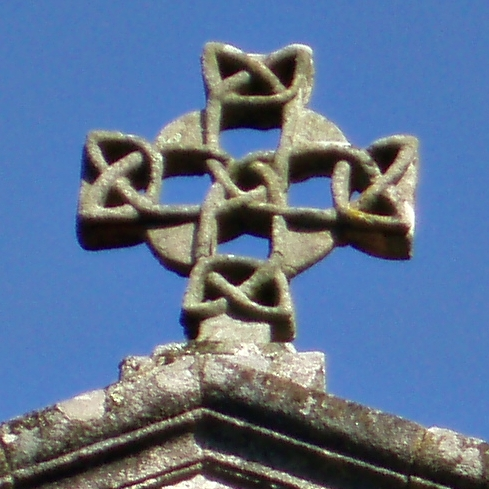
Gothic cross atop the church of Saint Susanna, in Santiago de Compostela

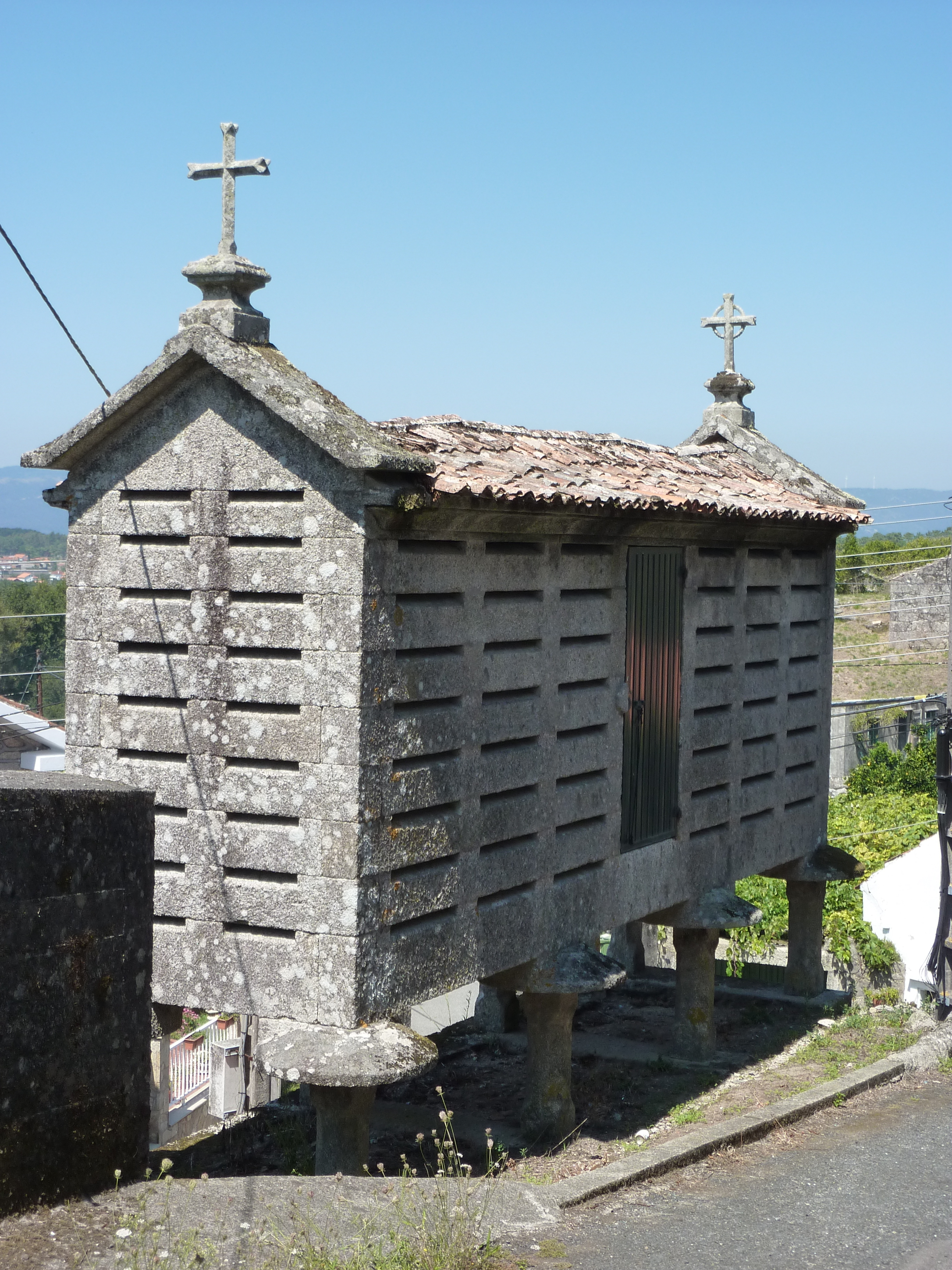
A Latin cross and a high cross atop a Galician hórreo (granary)

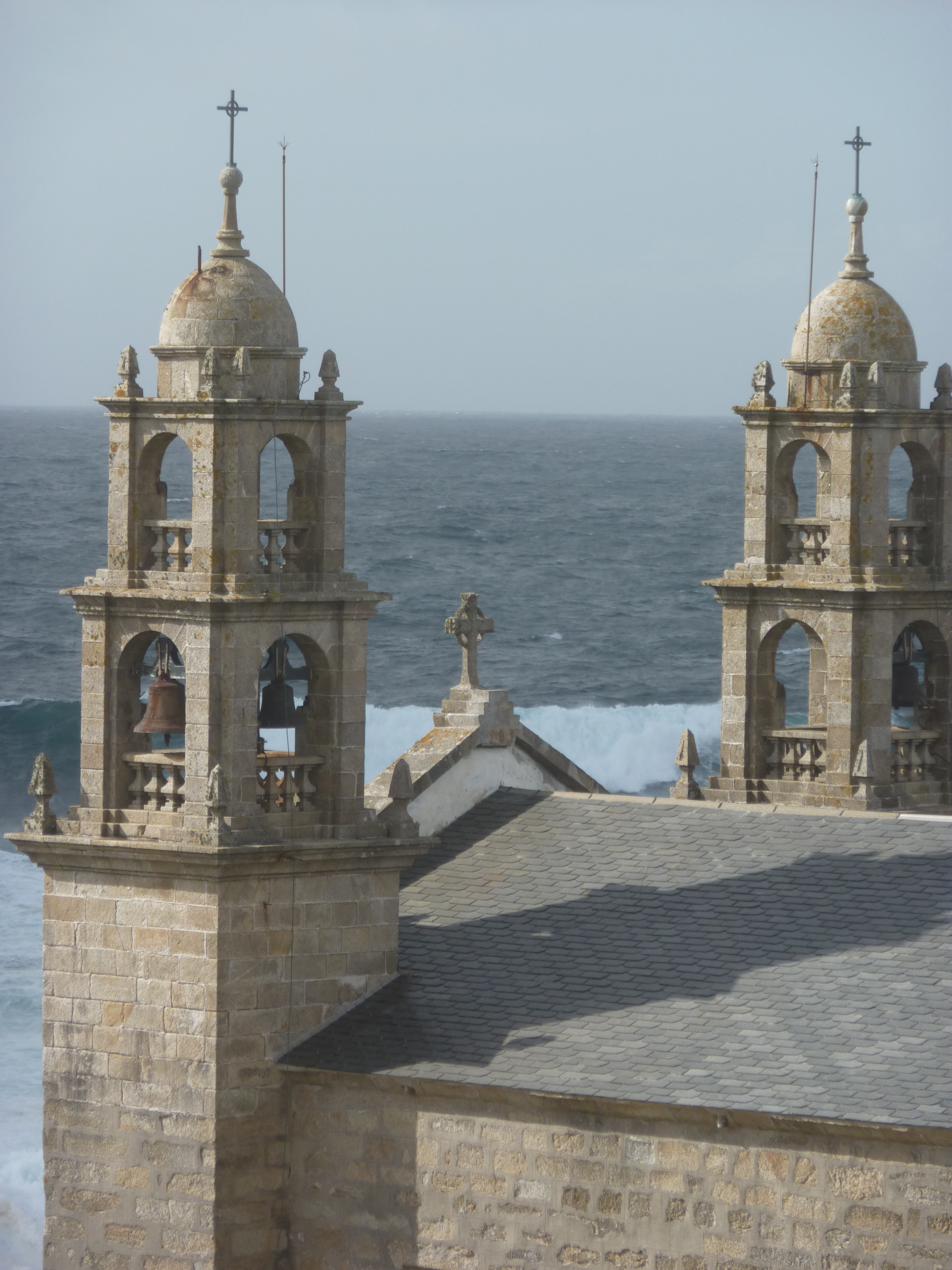
high crosses topping the sanctuary of a Virxe da Barca ('Our Lady of the Boat'), Muxía

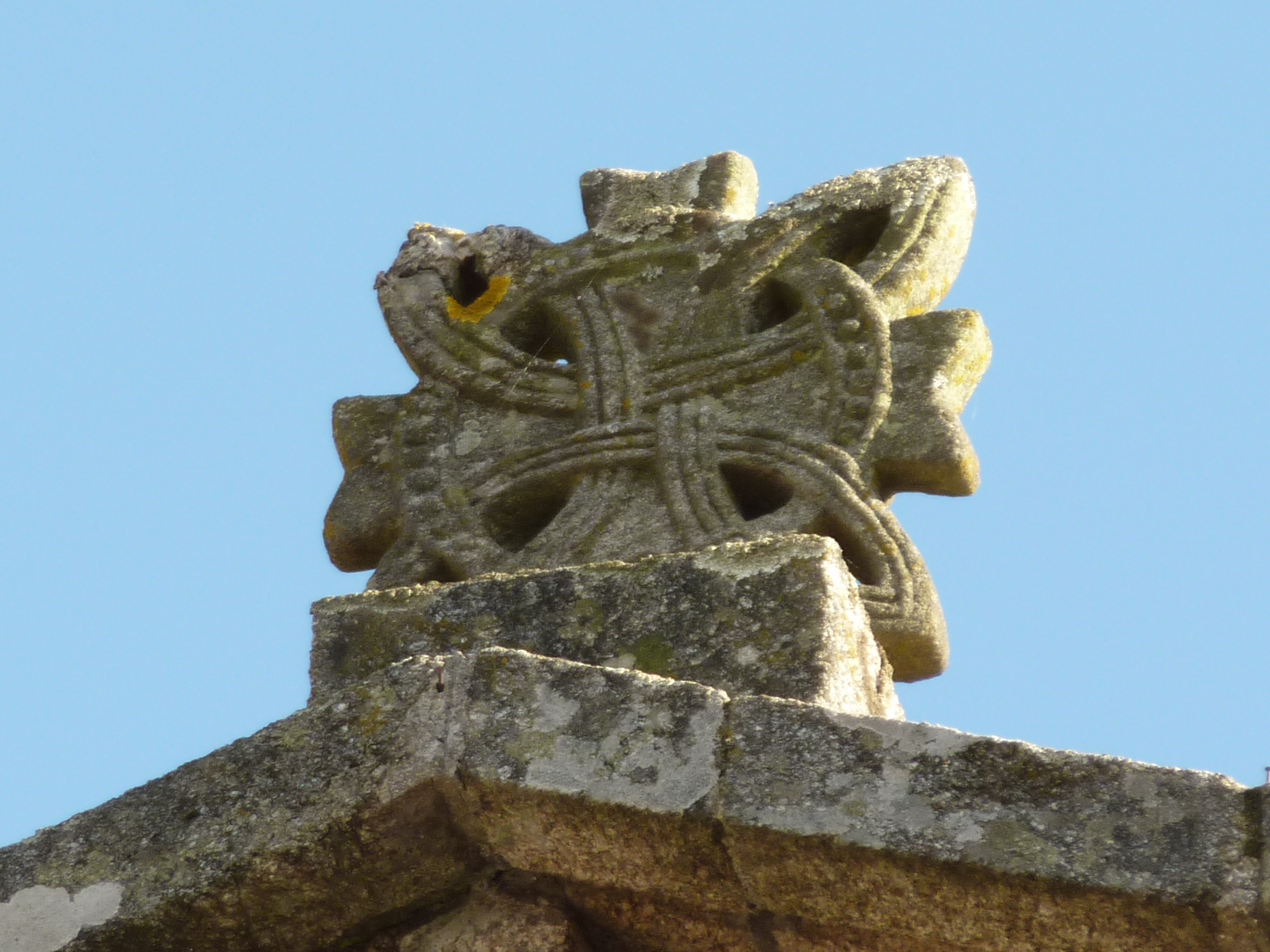
Cross topping the church of Saint Lazarus, Santiago de Compostela

== Western Europe ==
The Celtic cross is a variant of the ringed cross that emerged in France, Ireland and Britain in the Early Middle Ages. It is a Latin cross featuring a nimbus surrounding the intersection of the stem and arms. The Celtic cross became widespread through the distinctive stone high crosses erected across the islands beginning in the early 8th century; most, but not all, of these monuments take the form of the Celtic cross. Scholars debate the origins of the type, but it is related to earlier types of ringed crosses such as the "cosmological cross" used in Ravenna.

=== France ===
In France, Celtic crosses (far less in number and age than in the British Isles) are called the croix celtique or croix nimbée ("cross with nimbus"). They are found mainly in the western part of France: in Brittany, Normandy, Limousin as far as Auvergne in the centre. Most of them were made around the 16th century. One can be seen on the spire of Orléans Cathedral, in the Loire valley.

In Lower Normandy, in Cotentin, many churches have kept their tombstones decorated with a celtic cross.

Celtic crosses in France
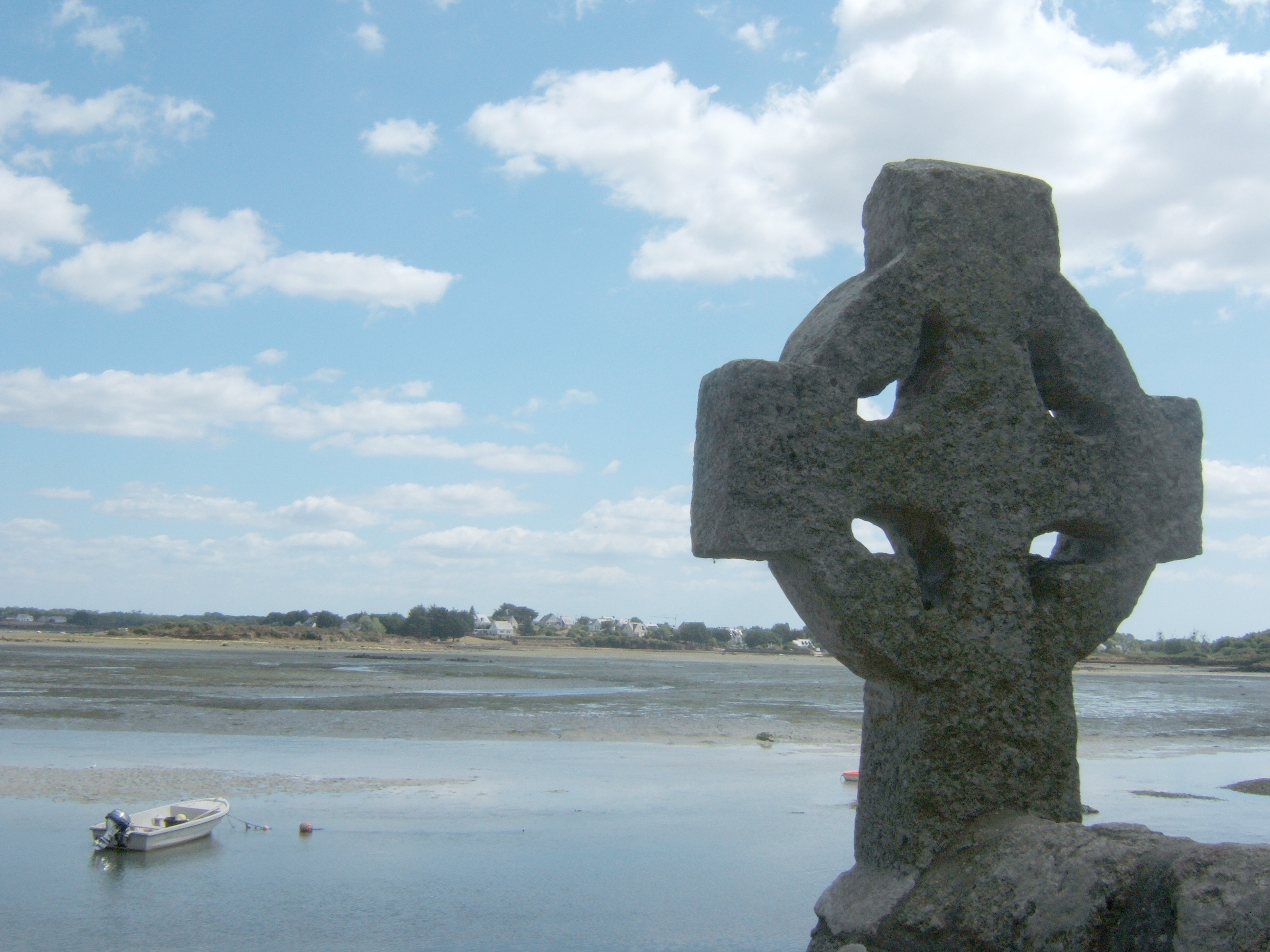
Brittany, Sant-Kadoù Island, the croix celtique de Saint Cado, Stêr an Intel (Étel river), erected 1990

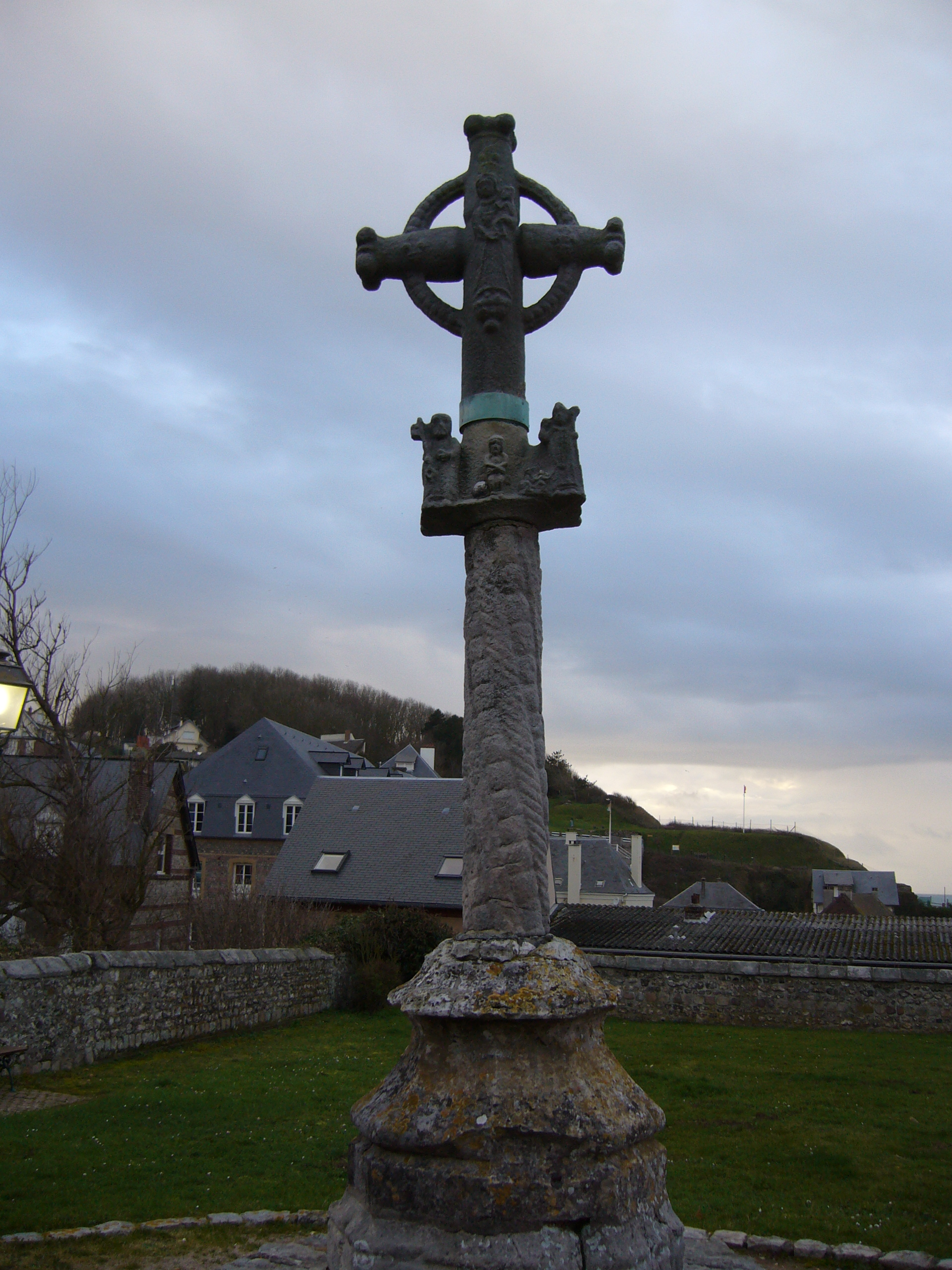
Normandy, the croix celtique de Veules-les-Roses, 15th century

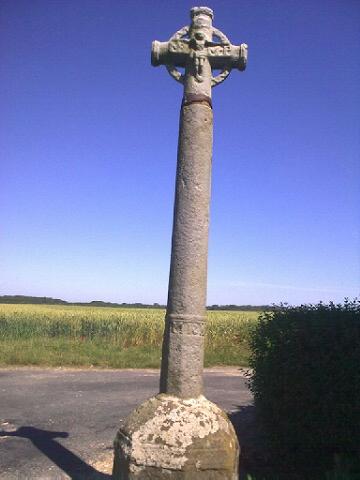
Normandy, the croix nimbée de Saint-Pierre-en-Port, 15th or 16th century

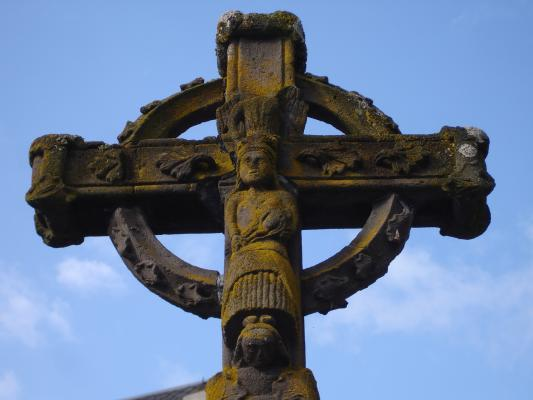
Auvergne, details of the croix nimbée de Chambon-sur-Lac, 16th century

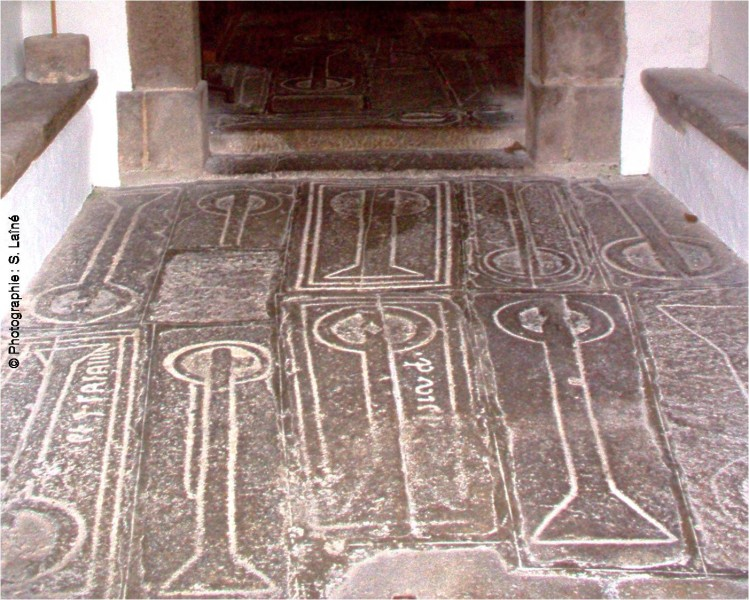
Normandy, Tombstones in the St Germain church, Flamanville, Middle Age

=== Great Britain ===
St. John's Cross at Iona Abbey, a monastery off the coast of Scotland with strong Irish roots and a major pilgrimage center, may be the prototype for all other high crosses. It is now kept in the abbey museum.

Celtic crosses in Great Britain
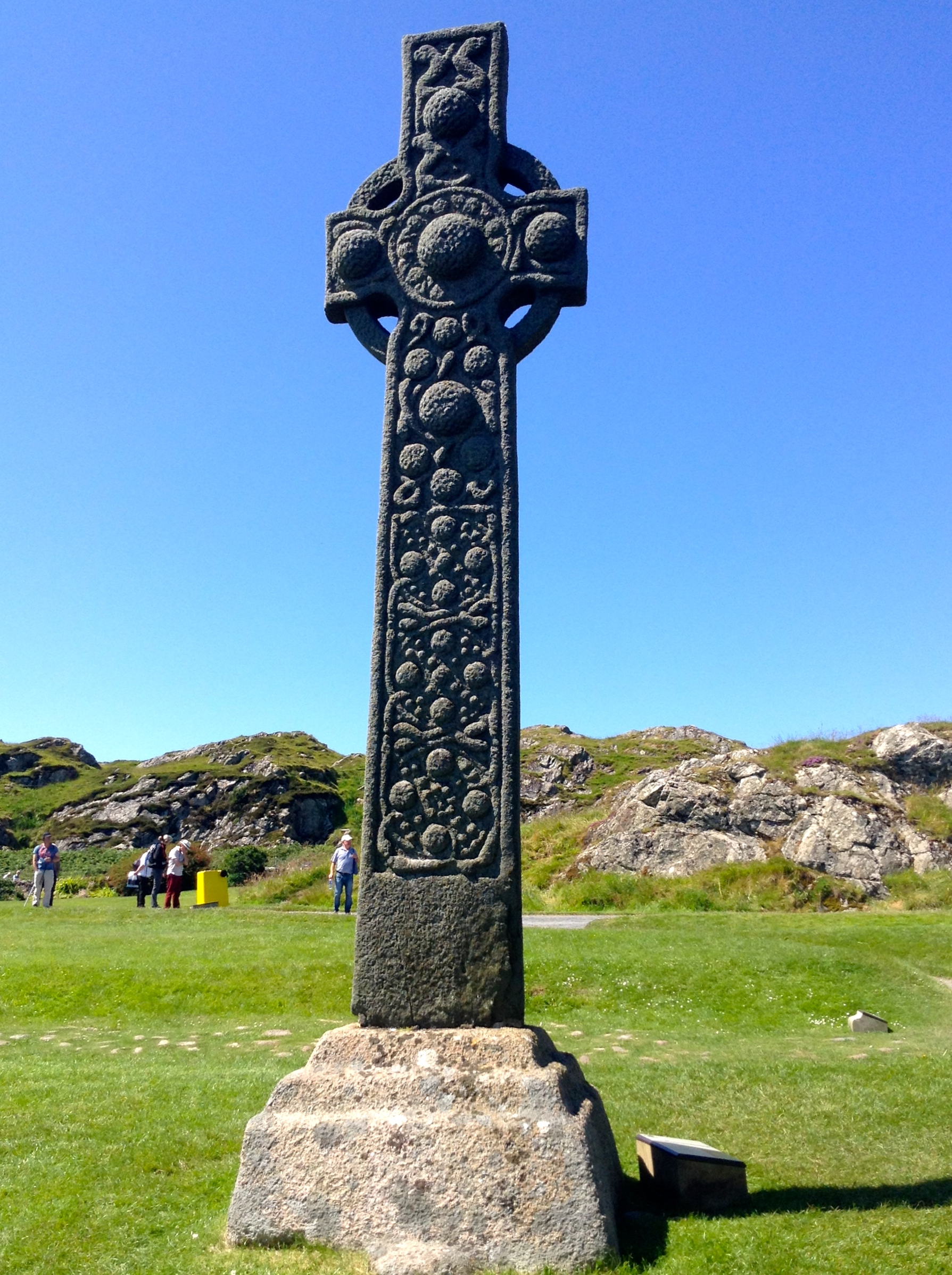
St. Martin's Cross, Iona, Scotland

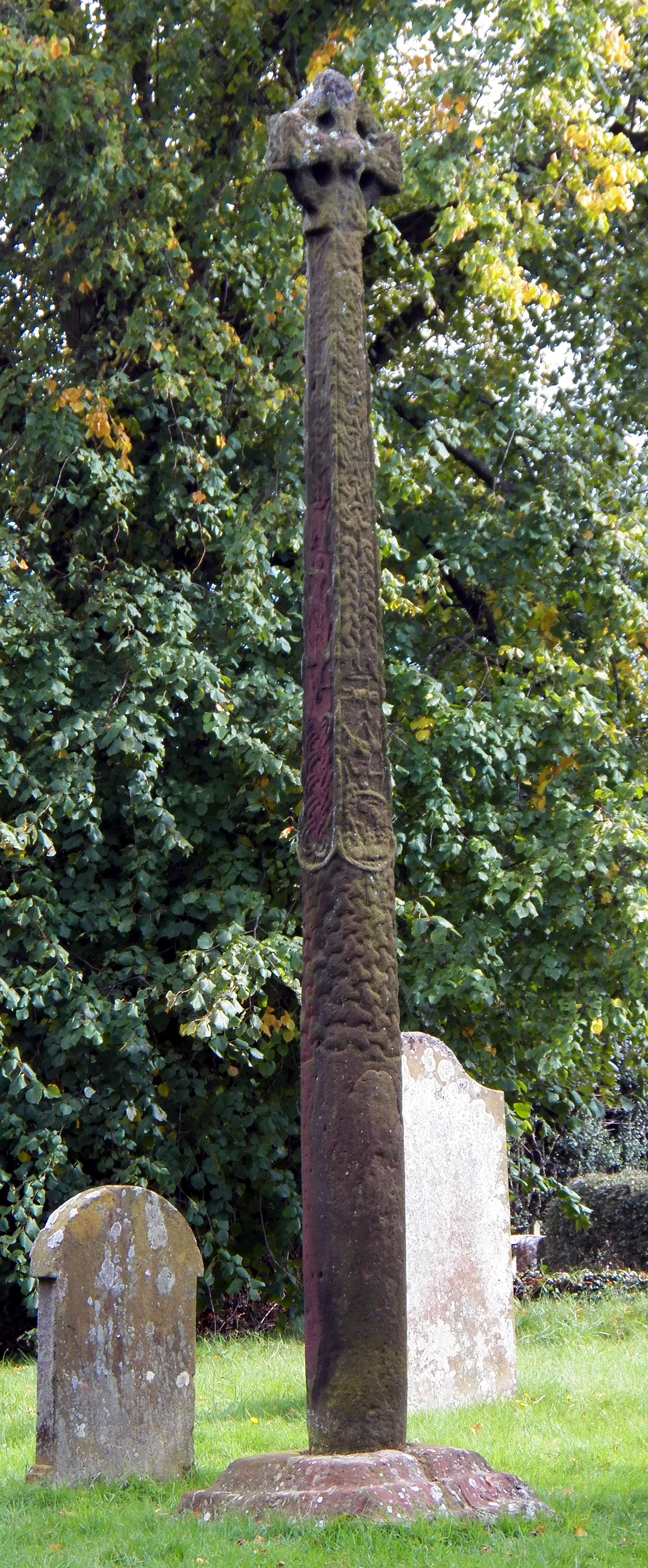
Gosforth Cross, Gosforth, England

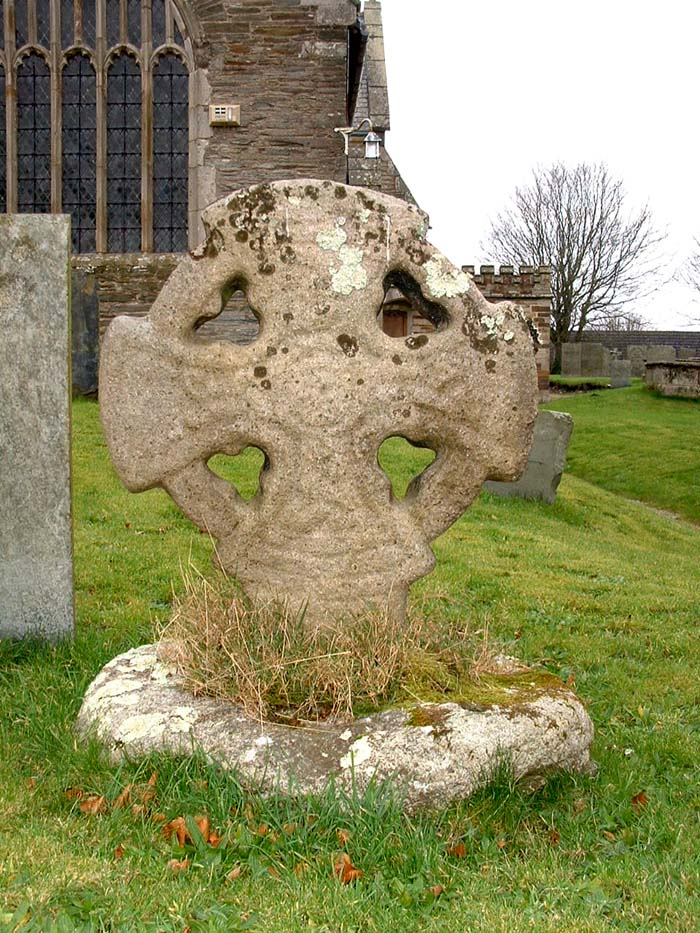
St Columba’s Cross, St Columb Major, Cornwall

=== Ireland ===
Most high crosses were made between the 8th and 10th centuries, with a briefer revival occurring in Ireland in the late 11th and 12th centuries.

The Celtic cross saw a resurgence in the mid-19th century, following new studies and reconstructions of the medieval high crosses. They subsequently became common objects in art, architecture, and merchandise during the Celtic Revival. They have since remained popular symbols of Ireland and "Celtic" identity.

Celtic crosses in Ireland
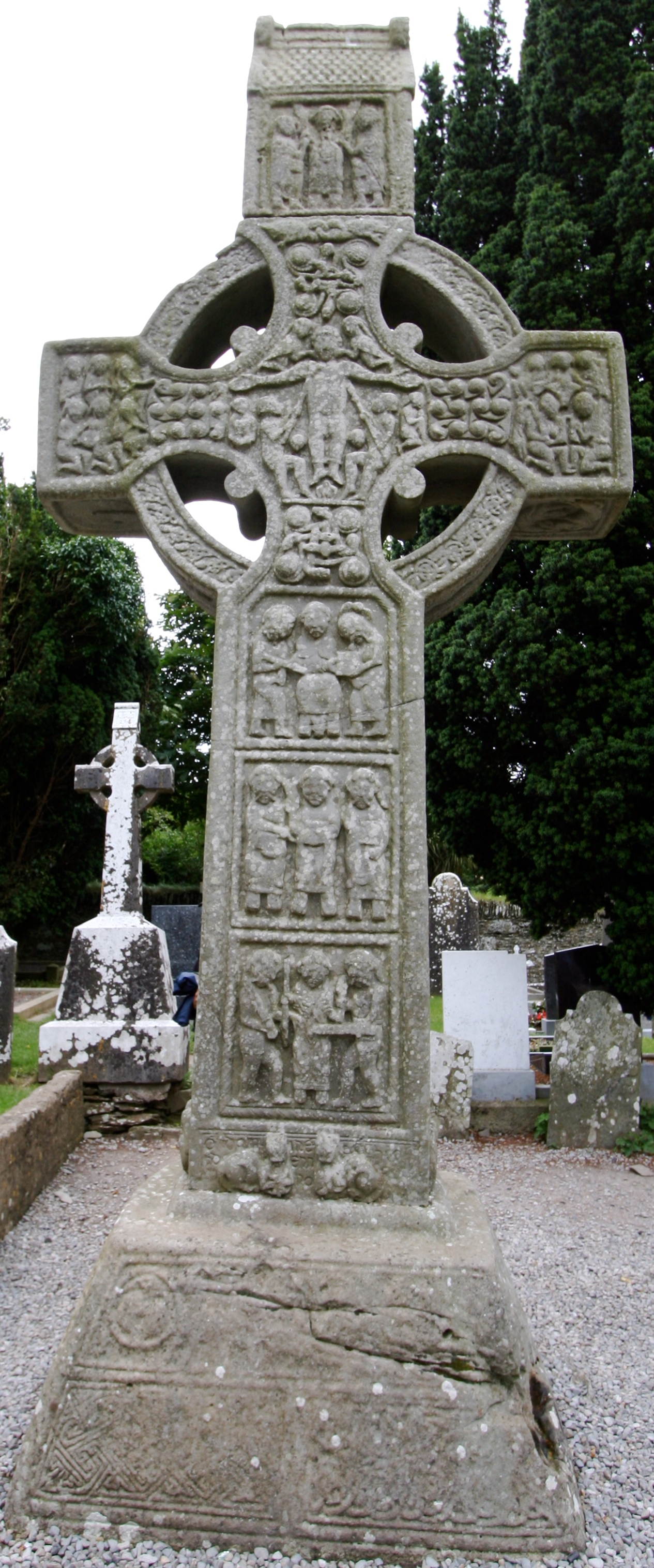
Muiredach's High Cross, Monasterboice, Ireland

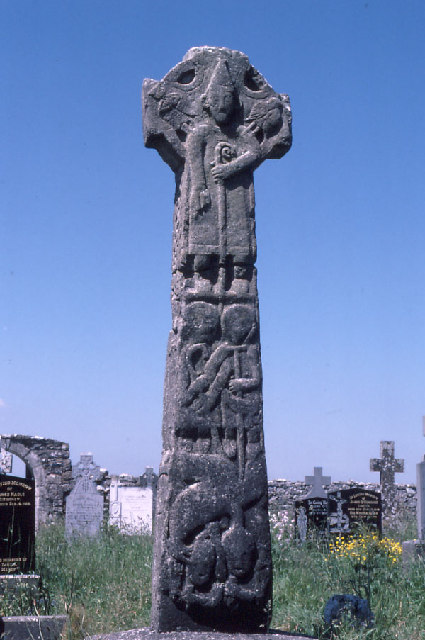
Doorty's Cross, Kilfenora, Ireland

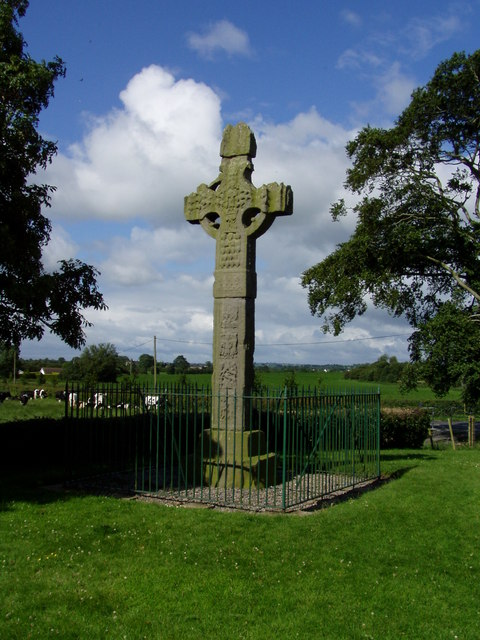
Ardboe High Cross, Ardboe, Northern Ireland

== Use with computer systems ==
Although many image files exist (and are used in this article), just one circled cross – the celtic cross – has an explicit code point in Unicode for use in transferable materials.

- U+1F548 🕈 CELTIC CROSS

Symbols designed for other purposes, such as U+1F728 🜨 ALCHEMICAL SYMBOL FOR VERDIGRIS, U+2295 ⊕ CIRCLED PLUS and U+2A01 ⨁ N-ARY CIRCLED PLUS OPERATOR, have been used as alternatives. These symbols (particularly 1F548 and 1F728) are not included in all computer fonts and consequently may not be displayed correctly or even at all. Furthermore, they may not be recognised by screen reader software used by people with visual impairment.
