= Alexander Hay Ritchie =

American engraver (1822–1895)

- Born: January 21, 1822; Glasgow, Scotland
- Died: September 19, 1895 (aged 73); New Haven, Connecticut, United States
- Education: Sir William Allan
- Known for: Engraving
- Notable work: Sherman's March to the Sea (1868)

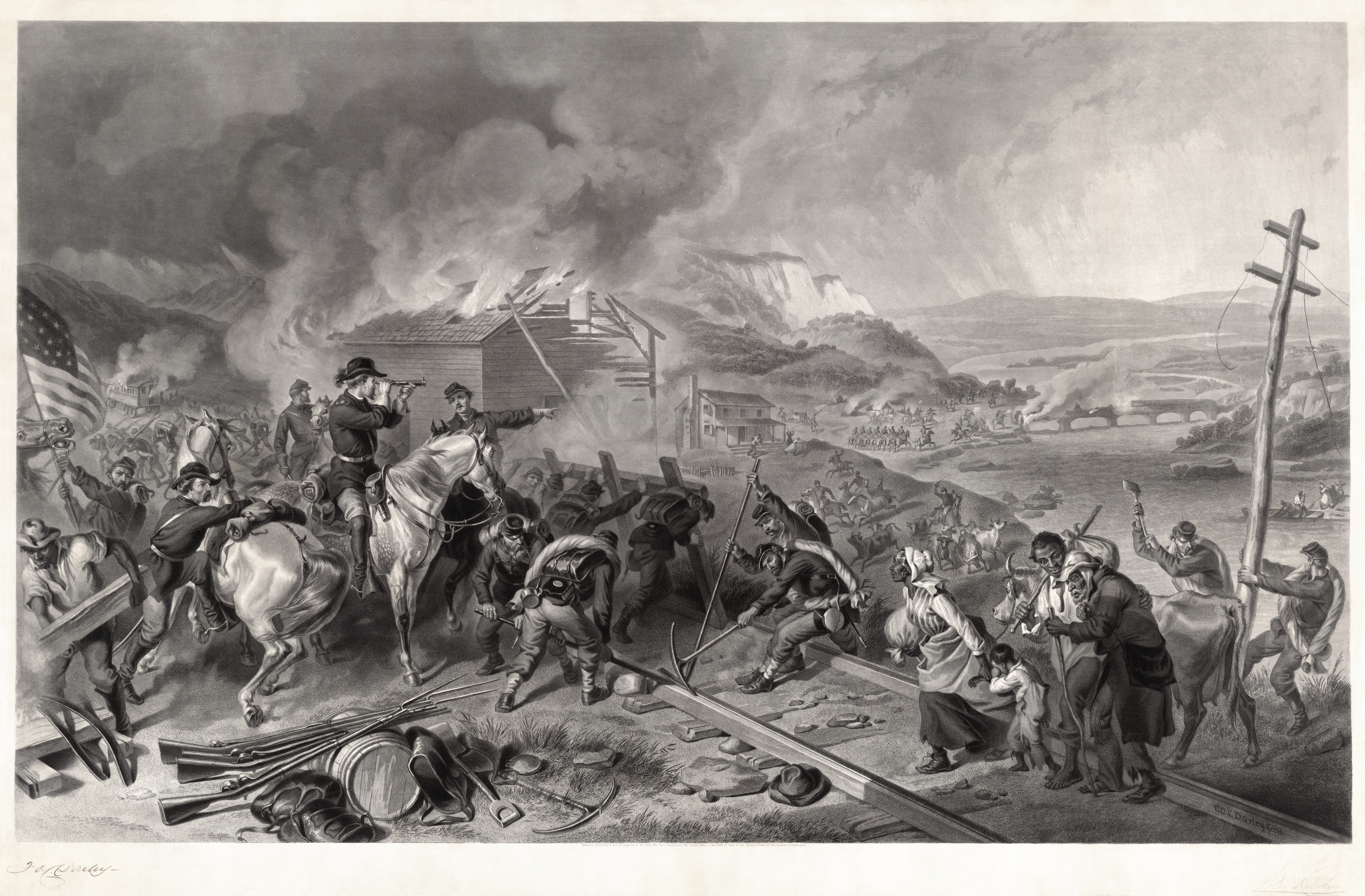
1868 engraving by Ritchie depicting Sherman's March to the Sea

Alexander Hay Ritchie (January 21, 1822 – September 19, 1895) was a Scottish-born American artist and engraver. He was born in Glasgow, and studied under Sir William Allan before moving to New York City in 1841. He specialised in mezzotints.
