= The Ball and the Cross =

Book by Gilbert Keith Chesterton

Cover of the first edition

The Ball and the Cross is a novel by G. K. Chesterton. The title refers to a more worldly and rationalist worldview, represented by a ball or sphere, and the cross representing Christianity. The first chapters of the book were serialized from 1905 to 1906 with the completed work published in 1909.

The novel's beginning involves debates about rationalism and religion between a Professor Lucifer and a monk named Michael. A part of this section was quoted in Pope John Paul I's letter to Chesterton in Illustrissimi. Much of the rest of the book concerns the duelling, figurative and somewhat more literal, of a Jacobite Catholic named Evan MacIan and an atheist socialist named James Turnbull. Lynette Hunter has argued that the novel is more sympathetic to MacIan, but does indicate MacIan is also presented as in some ways too extreme. Turnbull, as well, is presented in a sympathetic light: both duelists are ready to fight for and die for their antagonistic opinions and, in doing so, develop a certain partnership that evolves into a friendship. The real antagonist is the world outside, which desperately tries to prevent from happening a duel over "mere religion" (a subject both duelists judge of utmost importance).

Many have seen echoes in the novel of Chesterton's own longstanding and very public debates over religion with his friend, George Bernard Shaw.
