= Lugasson =

- Commune
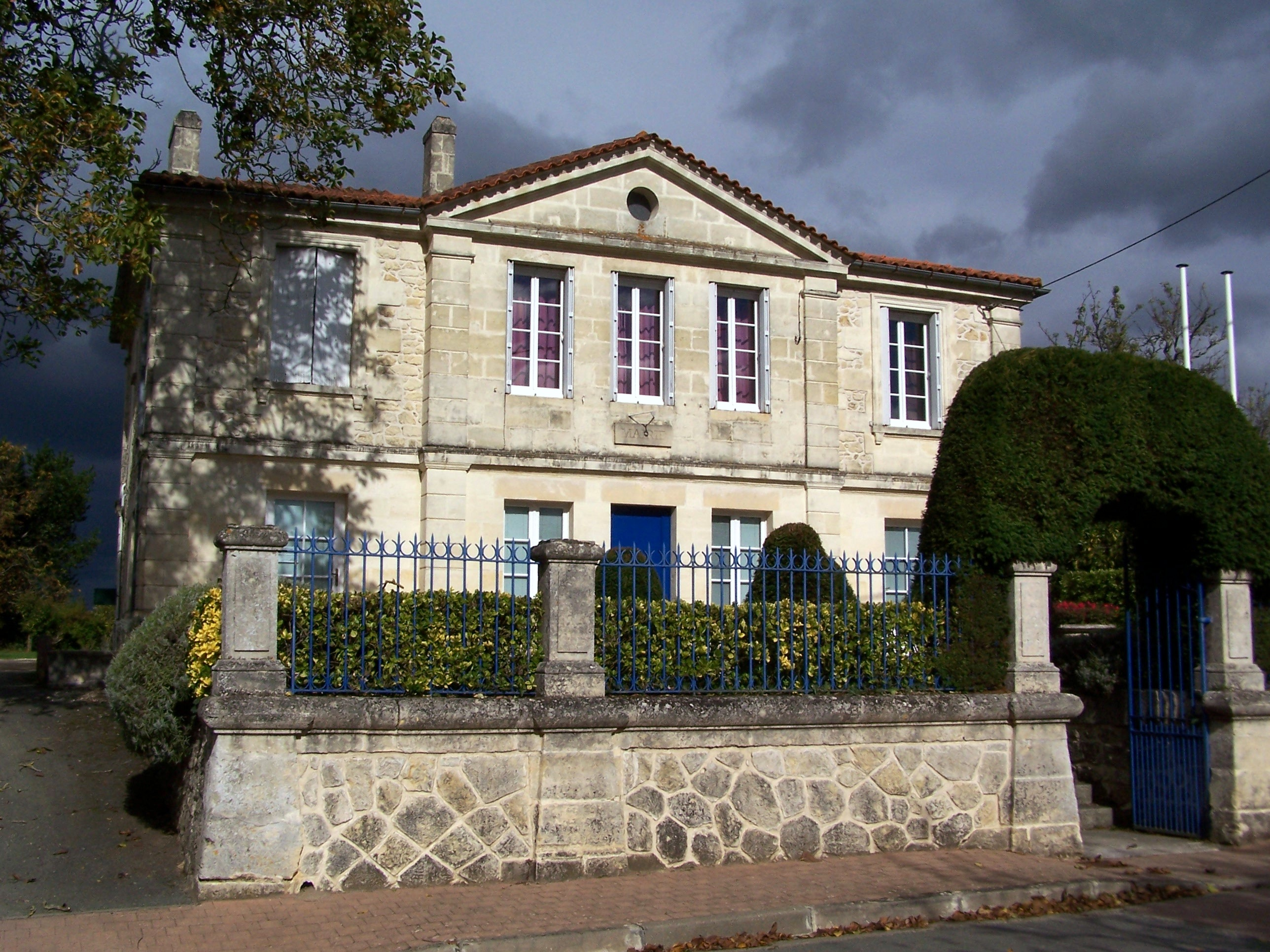
- Town hall
- Location of Lugasson
- Location within France Location within Nouvelle-Aquitaine
- Coordinates: 44°45′07″N 0°09′32″W
- Country: France
- Region: Nouvelle-Aquitaine
- Department: Gironde
- Arrondissement: Langon
- Canton: L'Entre-Deux-Mers

Government
  - Mayor (2020–2026): Michel Brun
- Area^{1}: 6.32 km^{2} (2.44 sq mi)
- Elevation: 30 m (98 ft)
- Highest elevation: 90 m (300 ft)
- Lowest elevation: 17 m (56 ft)
- Population (2023): 316
  - Density: 50.0/km^{2} (129/sq mi)
- Time zone: UTC+01:00 (CET)
  - Summer (DST): UTC+02:00 (CEST)
- INSEE/Postal code: 33258 /33760
- ^{1} French Land Register data, which excludes lakes, ponds, glaciers > 1 km^{2} (0.386 sq mi or 247 acres) and river estuaries.

Lugasson (French pronunciation: [lyɡasɔ̃]; Occitan: Lugaçon) is a commune in the Gironde department in Nouvelle-Aquitaine in southwestern France.

== Population ==
Historical population
Year	Pop.	±% p.a.
1968	306	—
1975	271	−1.72%
1982	282	+0.57%
1990	255	−1.25%
1999	237	−0.81%
2007	284	+2.29%
2012	277	−0.50%
2017	295	+1.27%
2023	316	+1.15%
Source: INSEE

== See also ==
- Communes of the Gironde department
