= Alexander and Euphemia Ritchie =

Scottish artists

Alexander Ritchie (1856–1941) and Euphemia Ritchie (1862–1941) were Celtic craft entrepreneurs from Iona, Scotland.

== Artistry ==
Alexander Ritchie (1856–1941) and Euphemia Ritchie (1862–1941) met at the Glasgow School of Art, marrying in 1898. They then moved to the island of Iona and opened a shop and silversmithing workshop. Their business was successful. The couple eventually created the brand "Iona Celtic Art" and produced some of their designs in English factories.

The Ritchies were active during the Arts and Crafts movement, which was present in Scotland as well as internationally. They took inspiration from Celtic culture and produced jewelry with Celtic designs. They also sold textiles, woodcarvings, and brassware. Some of their designs were taken from carved stones found on Iona. They produced souvenirs for visiting tourists, for which there was much demand as visitors to Iona grew. They also produced works of art later deemed "significant" by the Antiques Trade Gazette.

According to the scholars Sally M. Foster and Siân Jones, "the Ritchies are perceived as belonging firmly to the islanders’ heritage, while the crosses they spawned generate authentic connections with Iona, seamlessly linking the object, gift-giver, place, recipient and any new home to which they are given." They maintained a large library on the island, with books on Celtic studies and history published during the 19th-century. In 1928 they published a map of the island that helped visitors learn the Gaelic names of various sites.
