= Coptic cross =

Cross associated with Coptic Christians

Contemporary design used by the Coptic Orthodox Church; Coptic letters (Ⲓⲏ̅ⲥ̅ Ⲡⲭ̅ⲥ̅ Ⲡ̀ϣⲏⲣⲓ ⲙ̀ⲪϮ) are abbreviated nomina sacra for "Ⲓⲏⲥⲟⲩⲥ Ⲡⲓⲭ̀ⲣⲓⲥⲧⲟⲥ Ⲡ̀ϣⲏⲣⲓ ⲙ̀Ⲫ̀ⲛⲟⲩϯ" (Iêsous Piekhristos Epshêri Emefnouti; Jesus Christ, Son of God)

The Coptic cross is any of a number of Christian cross variants associated in some way with Coptic Christians.

== Typical form ==
The typical form of the "Coptic cross" used in the Coptic Church is made up of two bold lines of equal length that intersect at the middle at right angles. Each line terminates in three points, representing the Trinity of the Father, the Son, and the Holy Spirit. Altogether, the cross has 12 points symbolizing the Apostles, whose mission was to spread the Gospel message throughout the world. The cross most commonly used in Coptic churches is the Trefoil Cross (also known as Coptic Cross), which was a developed locally from the short Greek cross. The Coptic crosses often have a circle at the center representing God's eternal and everlasting love, demonstrated through the crucifixion of Christ, Christ's halo, and resurrection.

Bertran de la Farge dates it to the 4th century and cites it as a predecessor of the Occitan cross.

In 1984, a modern variant of the Coptic cross composed of three bars intersecting at right angles in three dimensions was given as a gift by the Coptic Orthodox Church and mounted on the top of the All Africa Conference of Churches building since the Coptic Church is considered to be the mother church in Africa.

== Popular culture ==
Many Copts have the cross tattooed as a sign of faith on the inside of their right arm at the wrist.

== Gallery ==
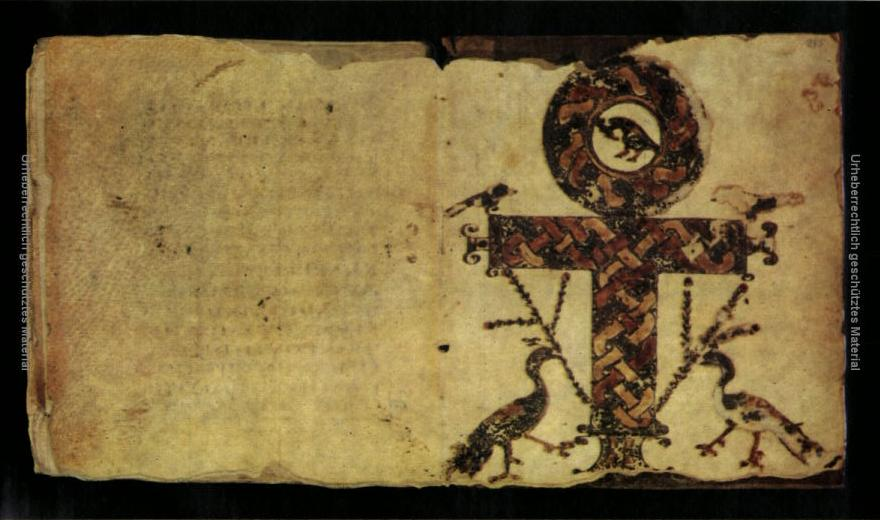
Illuminated early form of Coptic cross at the end of the 4th–5th century Coptic Codex Glazier

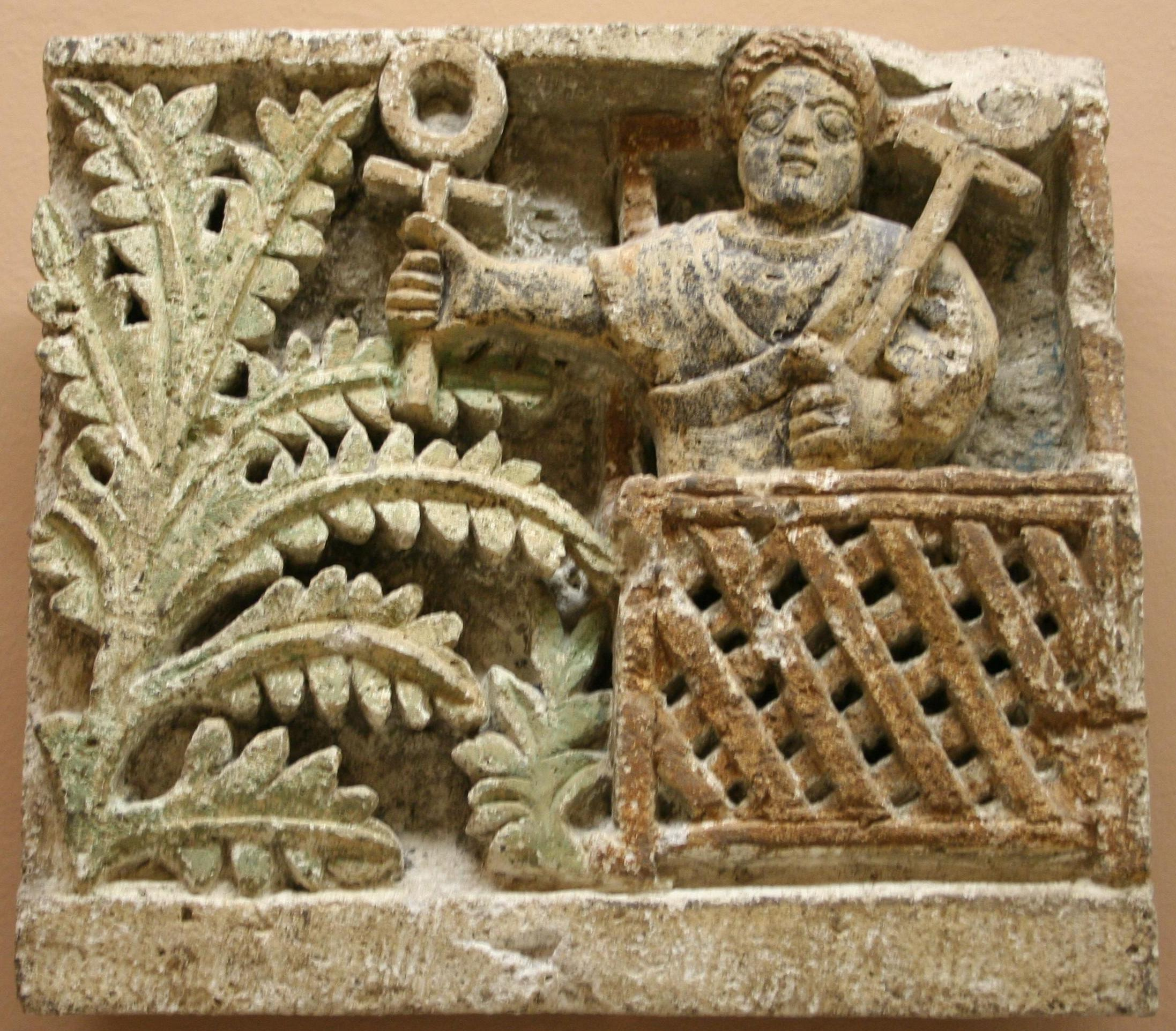
5th-century liturgical Coptic relief featuring the Coptic crux ansata

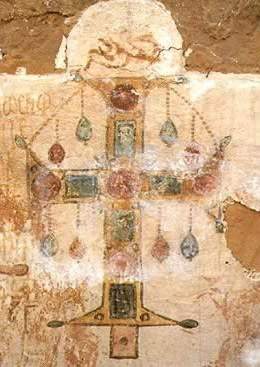
Wall painting of a jewelled cross (Kellia, Egypt, late 6th century)

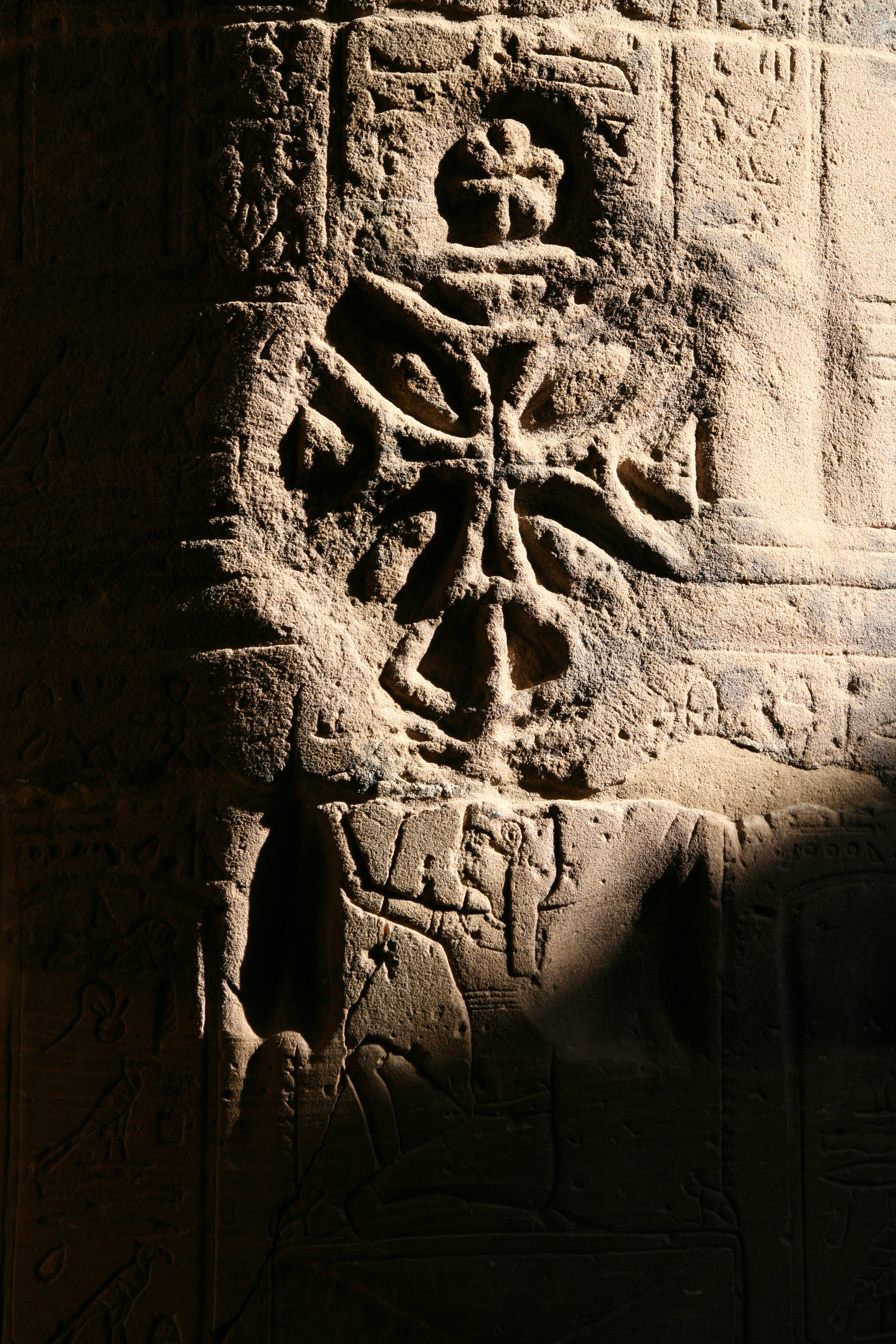
Coptic cross from the Ancient Egyptian Temple of Philae

Basic abstract equal-armed cross design with circle at center and surrounded by 4 nails. Called a "Coptic" cross by Rudolf Koch in his The Book of Signs (Dover); may not be prominent in Coptic Christian symbolism in this form.

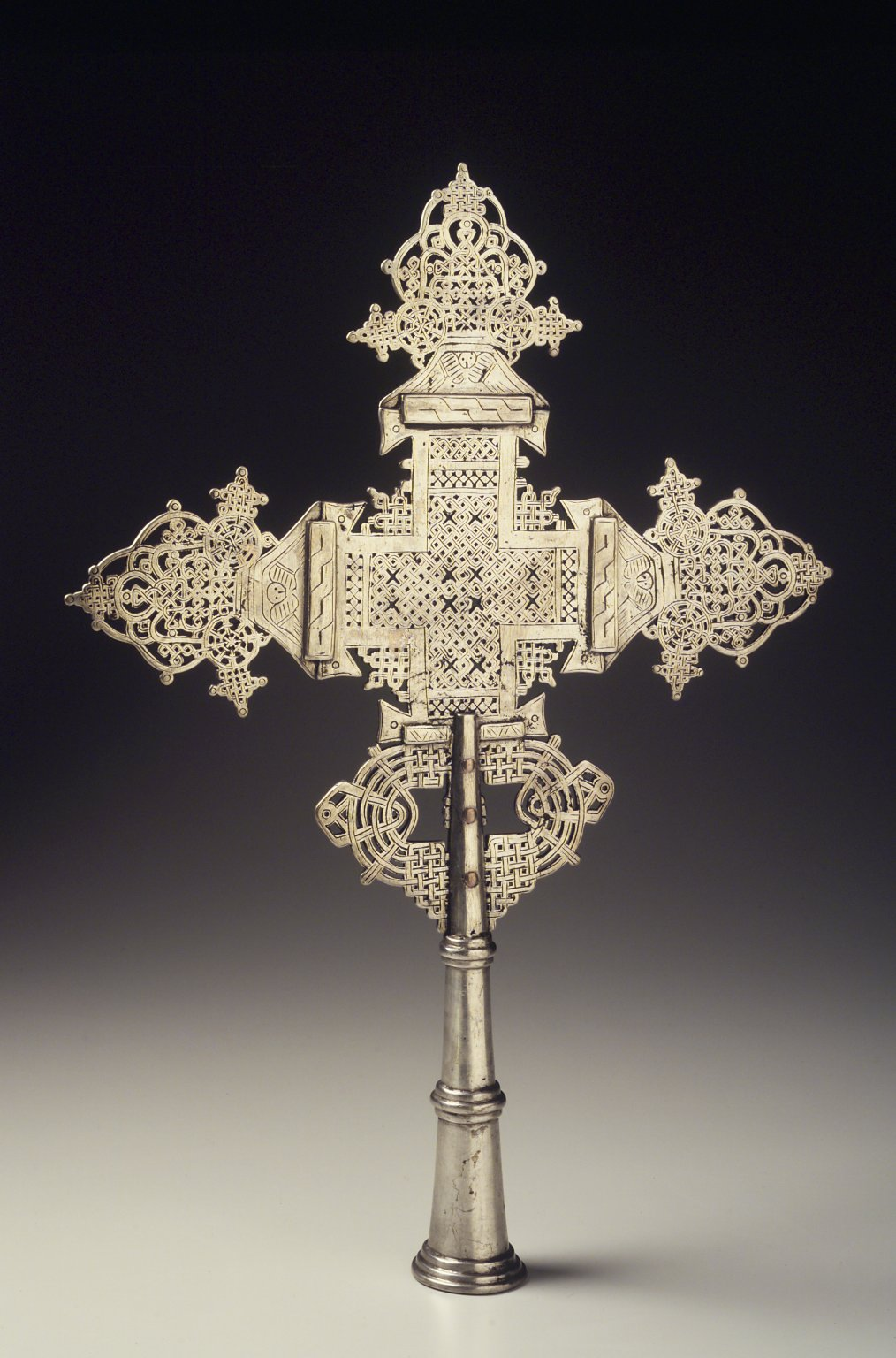
Ethiopian Orthodox Processional cross from the Amhara Region (mid-20th century)

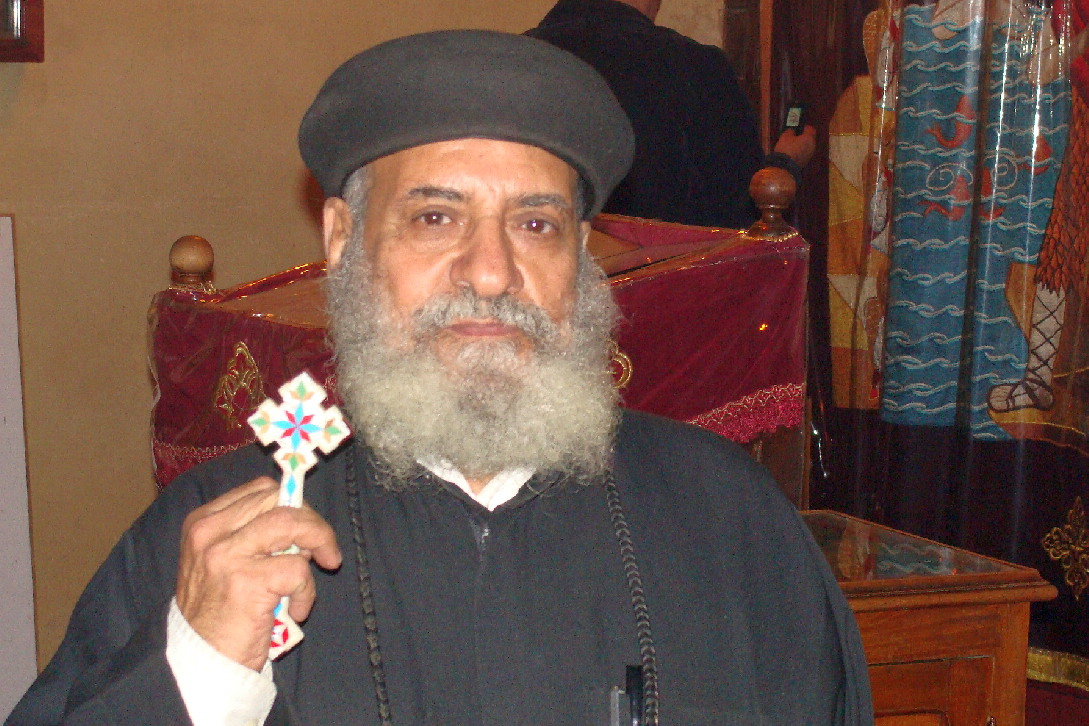
Coptic priest holding a hand-held blessing cross (Cairo, 2010)

== See also ==
- Alexandrian rite
