= List of occult symbols =

The following is a list of symbols associated with the occult.

== List ==
Name	Image	Origins	Notes
Ankh		Ancient Egyptian religion	Ancient Egyptian symbol for eternal life; now also associated with Kemetism and neo-paganism, as well as the Goth subculture. Yogi practitioners often claim they stretch an ankh symbol into their wrist.
Arrow (Belomancy)		Ancient divination	Arrows used to gain knowledge through divination.
Bagua		I Ching, Taoism	Literally, "The 8 Directions," this early Chinese divination technique is described in the I Ching, and is typically visualized as 8 trigrams around a Yin and Yang symbol. The bagua and trigrams are referenced throughout Chinese astronomy, astrology, geography, geomancy, anatomy, martial arts, Chinese medicine and various other cultural aspects.
Baphomet			Adopted by modern occultists and Satanists. Theistic Satanists may worship it as a deity or demon, while atheistic Satanists see it as a metaphorical symbol. The goat-headed Baphomet image seen here is a 19th-century drawing made by Eliphas Levi as a metaphorical symbol from Dogme et Rituel de la Haute Magie. It was not originally created as a Satanic symbol or a deity. See also: Sigil of Baphomet and Statue of Baphomet.
Black Sun		Nazi occultism and later the neo-Nazi movement	A symbol of the sun composed of twelve sig runes first appearing on the floor of the north tower of Wewelsburg, after Heinrich Himmler ordered it to be remodeled. It gained modern popularity due to its use by Nazi occultists. It was later adopted by Satanists. The name "Black Sun" was coined by Wilhelm Landig of the Landig Group.
Solar symbol		Alchemy, Western esotericism	The alchemical symbol for the sun and various sun gods. Is is also the alchemical symbol for gold, the metal most commonly correlated with the sun in Alchemy and broader Western esotericism.
Eye of Horus		Ancient Egyptian religion	The eye of the god Horus, a symbol of protection, now associated with the occult and Kemetism, as well as the Goth subculture.
Eye of Providence (All-Seeing Eye, Eye of God)		Catholic iconography, Masonic symbolism	The eye of God within a triangle, representing the Holy Trinity, and surrounded by light.
Heptagram		Thelema, Wicca, Alchemy	Represents the seven days of creation. It is the symbol of Babalon in Thelema. In Wicca, it is known as the Elven Star, Fairy Star or Septagram.
Hexagram		Mandala, Judaism, Western esotericism	An ancient symbol of the Jewish faith, also found on the Seal of Solomon. In Ceremonial magic, it is used to represent the seven traditional planets.
Icelandic magical staves		Icelandic magic	Sigils created with magical powers by the Icelandic people. Pictured is the stave known as Ægishjálmur.
I'itoi		Uto-Aztecan O'odham peoples of Arizona	The I'itoi is an indigenous spiritual symbol that signifies the challenging and balancing decisions in one's life that lead us to our ultimate dream state from the product of all of our choices. The ideal is to reach the center of this maze of decisions we make, which is a manifestation of our purpose and dream, and is accepted by the Sun God upon our death.
Inverted cross		Acts of Peter	Used as a symbol of Saint Peter in reference to the traditional martyrdom story of his crucifixion in the head down position, originating from The Acts of Peter of the New Testament apocrypha. It has also been modernly used as an anti-Christian symbol.
Leviathan cross		Alchemy, Satanism	Alchemical symbol for black sulfur, the impure byproduct of sulfur purification. Misidentified in the 20th century as a symbol for brimstone, this symbol was used in Anton LaVey's Satanic Bible which associated it with the fire and brimstone of Hell. Also known as a "Satan's cross". The symbol is composed of an infinity symbol and a two-barred cross. Various symbolism has later been ascribed to it, such as the two-barred cross representing balance between the masculine and the feminine.
Lilith Black Moon (Sigil of Lilith)		Judaism, Mesopotamian and Jewish mythology, Lilith Astrology	Depicts a crescent moon atop a cross with arms of equal length, representing mind and matter. In Jewish mythology, Lilith is considered to be the first wife of Adam. The Sigil of Lilith symbolizes the she-demon Lilith, who was demonized for rebelling against God's word.
Monas Hieroglyphica		the works of John Dee	A symbol invented by John Dee, alchemist and astrologer at the court of Elizabeth I of England. It represents (from top to bottom): the moon; the sun; the elements; and fire.
Ouroboros		Ancient Egypt and Persia, Norse mythology	A serpent or dragon consuming its own tail, it is a symbol of infinity, unity, and the cycle of death and rebirth.
Pelican in her Piety		Physiologus	A mother pelican wounded her own breast to revive her dead young, an allegorical symbol for Jesus Christ's sacrifice and resurrection. In esoteric philosophy, the pelican represents the highest stages of the Magnum Opus (the Great Work): the cyclical drawing of blood mirrors the alchemical process of solve et coagula (dissolve and coagulate), where the mother bird breaks down the "old self" (dissolving), to bring it back to life with her own vital essence (coagulating). The mother pelican's self-sacrifice represents the catalyst that transforms base, imperfect metals (the baby birds) into the ultimate spiritual tincture. The symbol is a core teaching within the Scottish Rite of Freemasonry; initiates of the 18th Degree (Knight of the Rose Croix) learn about the pelican as an emblem of ultimate self-sacrifice and charity toward one's brethren.
Pentacle (Pentagram)		Western esotericism, Wicca	An ancient symbol of a unicursal five-pointed star circumscribed by a circle with many meanings, including but not limited to, the five wounds of Christ and the five elements (earth, fire, water, air, and soul). In Satanism, it is flipped upside-down. See also: Sigil of Baphomet.
Rose Cross		Rosicrucianism, Hermetic Order of the Golden Dawn	A symbol associated with Christian Rosenkreuz, with many different attributions of symbolism.
Runes		Norse mythology	Ancient alphabet used throughout North Europe and prominent in Scandinavia, used in modern times by various religious faiths, such as Asatru.
Seal of Solomon		Alchemy, Christian and Jewish esotericism	A ring attributed to king Solomon in Jewish and esoteric tradition. Also modernly used in Western occultism to symbolize the union of male and female through magic rituals.
Septenary Sigil		Order of Nine Angles	The main symbol of the Order of Nine Angles.
Sigil of Baphomet		19th century French Occultism, Joy of Satan Ministries	Official emblem of the Church of Satan, consisting of the head of a goat transfixed upon a reversed pentagram flanked by the Hebrew letters of the word "Leviathan" (לִוְיָתָן). The right image is the same sigil in cuneiform from the Joy of Satan Ministries, a recreation of the sigil of Baphomet incorporated with cuneiform lettering instead of Hebrew to spell out "Satan", and made after Maxine Dietrich's reinterpretation of the ideology of spiritual Satanism.
Sigils of Goetia		The Lesser Key of Solomon	The 72 Goetia sigils are unique occult symbols found in the first section of the 17th-century grimoire known as the Lemegeton, or The Lesser Key of Solomon. In western ceremonial magic, these specific seals serve as calling cards or keys used by a practitioner to summon, bind, and communicate with one of the 72 spirits or demons traditionally cataloged by King Solomon.
Sigil of Lucifer		Grimorium Verum	A sigil used in rituals invoking Lucifer, first recorded in the 18th-century True Grimoire. Known among Theistic Satanists as the Seal of Satan, the symbol is also associated with music groups including Zeal & Ardor.
Sigillum Dei (Seal of God)		Europe, late Middle Ages	A magical diagram, composed of two circles, a pentagram, and three heptagons, and is labeled with the name of God and his angels.
Squared circle		Alchemy	A symbol of the Philosopher's stone. Depicted on the left image is Michael Maier's Emblem XXI from Atalanta Fugiens.
Sriramachakra		Tamil mysticism	A mystic diagram used for astrology.
Sri Yantra		Shri Vidya school of Hinduism	A yantra consisting of nine interlocking triangles. Four upward ones which represent Shiva, and five downward ones representing Shakti that surround the central bindu point. In three dimensions, it represents Mahāmeru, and in particular, all yantras emerge from Sri Yantra. It symbolizes the evolution of the multiverse as a result of natural divine will of the mother goddess Aadi Paraa Shakti, as well as the more profound reality of Unity of God through its various unfoldings.
Sulfur cross	Sulfur/the combustible elements Phosphorus symbol upside down	Alchemy	Alchemical symbols for sulfur, associated with the fire and brimstone of Hell.
Sun		Alchemy and Hermeticism	A symbol used with many different meanings, including but not limited to, gold, citrinitas, sulfur, the divine spark of man, nobility and incorruptibility.
Sun cross		Iron Age religions and later gnosticism and neo-paganism.	An ancient pagan symbol of the sun, adopted by gnostics, neopagans and occultists.
Supreme Polarity (Taijitu)		Zhou Dunyi (1017-1073 AD), Taoism	"Explanation of the Diagram of the Supreme Ultimate", which became the cornerstone of Neo-Confucianist cosmology
Symbol of Chaos		Michael Moorcock, Aleister Crowley and chaos magic	A symbol originating from The Eternal Champion, later adopted by occultists and role-playing games.
Tetractys (Tetrad)		Greek school of Pythagoreanism	The tetractys is an equidistant and equiangular arrangement of ten points inside a triangle, akin to the fourth triangle number. It was developed by Pythagoras, and collectively signifies cosmic unity in the form of The Decad, as well as the musica universalis, or collective abstraction of the music generated by heavenly cosmic bodies. It also represents the four elements of nature, as well as the dimensional organization of space-time. Learning and adhering to its metaphysical knowledge was a requirement inside the occult Pythagorean religions.
Tetragrammaton		Judaism, Kodesh, Kabbalah	Considered to be the unspeakable name of God, written as YHWH. The four letter name has many pronunciations and can be seen over 7,000 times throughout the Hebrew Bible. As symbol, it was incorporated into the Greek Tetractys by Jewish Kabbalistic occult tradition as an evolving arrangement of ten letters. In gematria, YHWH has a numerical value of 72 (center image). The right image contains the Tetragrammaton in tetractys formation, accompanied by the late-Renaissance Pentagrammaton, below.
Tree of Life (Kabbalah)		Kabbalah	The tree of life is a diagram used in various mystical traditions. It usually consists of 10 nodes symbolizing different archetypes and 22 lines connecting the nodes. The nodes are often arranged into three columns to represent that they belong to a common category
Unicursal hexagram		Aleister Crowley's Thelema	Symbol of the Thelema religion, a hexagram that can be drawn with one line.
Vishvarupa (Cosmic Man)		Vaishnavism, Hinduism	This iconographical form of the Hindu Trimurti god Visnu, whose body represents the structure and form of the entire cosmos. Traditionally, the different domains of Hell are represented by the legs and feet, with the Earthly realm represented by the groin, and the harmonious Heavenly domains represented by the upper stomach and chest, arms, and head. The navel represents the Unmanifest realm that is connected with pure sound and vibration, and absolute silence, connecting the entire cosmos together.
Zodiac Man (Homo Signorum, or 'Man of Signs')		Astrology	A graph correlating zodiacal names with body parts.

== See also ==
- List of occult terms
- List of occultists
- List of alchemical symbols
- List of books about magic (categorization)
