= Baboquivari =

Baboquivari may refer to:

- 2059 Baboquivari, a near-Earth asteroid
- Baboquivari Peak Wilderness, a protected area in the U.S. state of Arizona
- Baboquivari National Forest, a former National Forest in the United States
- Baboquivari High School, a high school in Sells, Arizona
