= Kitt Peak =

Mountain in Arizona, United States

- Kitt Peak, with the Nicholas U. Mayall Telescope on top.

Highest point
- Elevation: 6,886 ft (2,099 m) NAVD 88
- Prominence: 2,092 ft (638 m)
- Coordinates: 31°57′54″N 111°35′57″W

Geography
- Location within Arizona
- Location: Tohono O'odham Nation; Pima County, Arizona, U.S.
- Parent range: Quinlan Mountains
- Topo map: USGS Kitt Peak

Climbing
- Easiest route: Road

Kitt Peak (O'odham: Ioligam) is a mountain in the U.S. state of Arizona, and at 6,883 feet (2,098 m) is the highest point in the Quinlan Mountains. It is the location of the Kitt Peak National Observatory. The radio telescope at the observatory is one of ten dishes comprising the Very Long Baseline Array radio telescope.

The peak was named in English by county surveyor George J. Roskruge for his sister, Phillippa, who was the wife of William F. Kitt. On his 1893 Pima County Survey map, Roskruge spelled the name 'Kits'. At the request of the wife of George F. Kitt, the spelling was changed by decision in 1930.

Kitt Peak is the second-highest peak on the Tohono O'odham Indian Reservation, and as such is the second-most sacred after Baboquivari Peak. Near the summit is I'itoi's Garden, which the nation's lore holds summer residence of its elder brother deity. The name Ioligam means "red stick" in reference to the abundance of manzanita bushes on and around the mountain.
