= Black Sun (symbol) =

Neo-Nazi and esoteric symbol

The Black Sun symbol

The Black Sun (German: Schwarze Sonne) is a type of sun wheel (Sonnenrad) symbol originating in Nazi Germany and later employed by neo-Nazis and other far-right individuals and groups. It first appeared in Nazi Germany as a design element in a castle at Wewelsburg, remodeled and expanded by the head of the Schutzstaffel (SS), Heinrich Himmler, which he intended to serve as the SS's center. The symbol appeared nowhere else in Nazi Germany. The symbol's design consists of twelve radial sig runes similar to those that made up the SS logo.

It is unknown whether the design had a name or held any particular significance among the SS. Its contemporary association with the occult dates back to a 1991 German novel, Die Schwarze Sonne von Tashi Lhunpo (The Black Sun of Tashi Lhunpo), by the pseudonymous author Russell McCloud. The book links the Wewelsburg mosaic with the neo-Nazi concept of the "Black Sun", invented by former SS officer Wilhelm Landig as a substitute for the Nazi swastika.

== Possible precursors ==
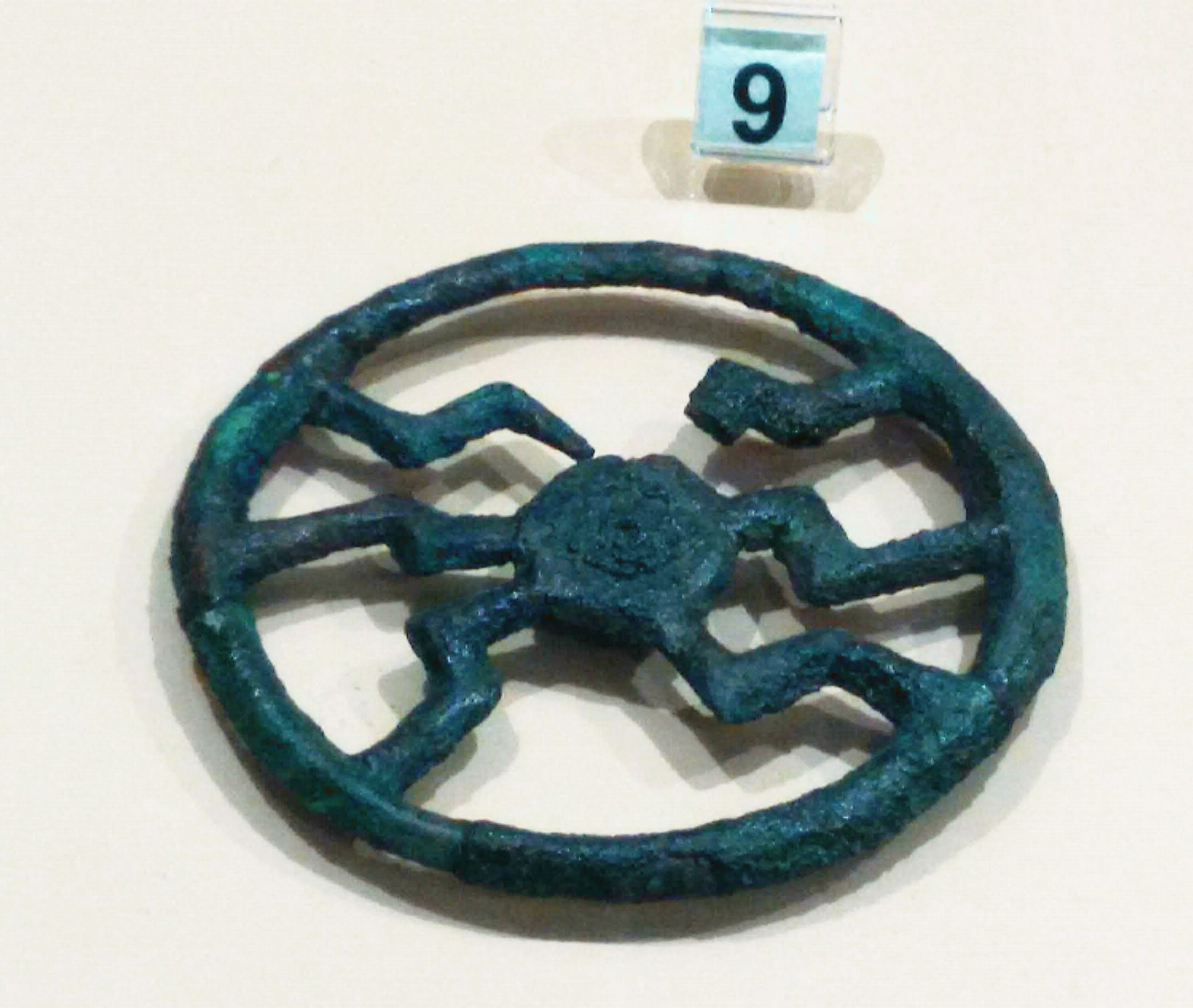
Zierscheibe that was part of a woman's belt from the Villanovan culture, found in the necropolis of Verucchio, Italy, 800–700 BC (Iron Age).

Some scholars have suggested that the Black Sun may have been inspired from motifs found on Zierscheiben, a type of ornamental disk found in European Iron Age graves from Central Europe and continuing into the Merovingian period. These have been suggested to represent the sun, or its passing through the year. (Note: According to Goodrick-Clarke, "[i]t has been suggested that this twelve-spoke sun wheel derives from decorative disks from the Merovingians of the early medieval period and are supposed to represent the visible sun or its passage through the months of the year. These disks were discussed in scholarly publications during the Third Reich and may well have served the Wewelsburg designers as a model.") Researcher Daniela Siepe says, however, that "such a connection has yet to be confirmed through reliable sources".

== Wewelsburg mosaic and the Nazi period ==
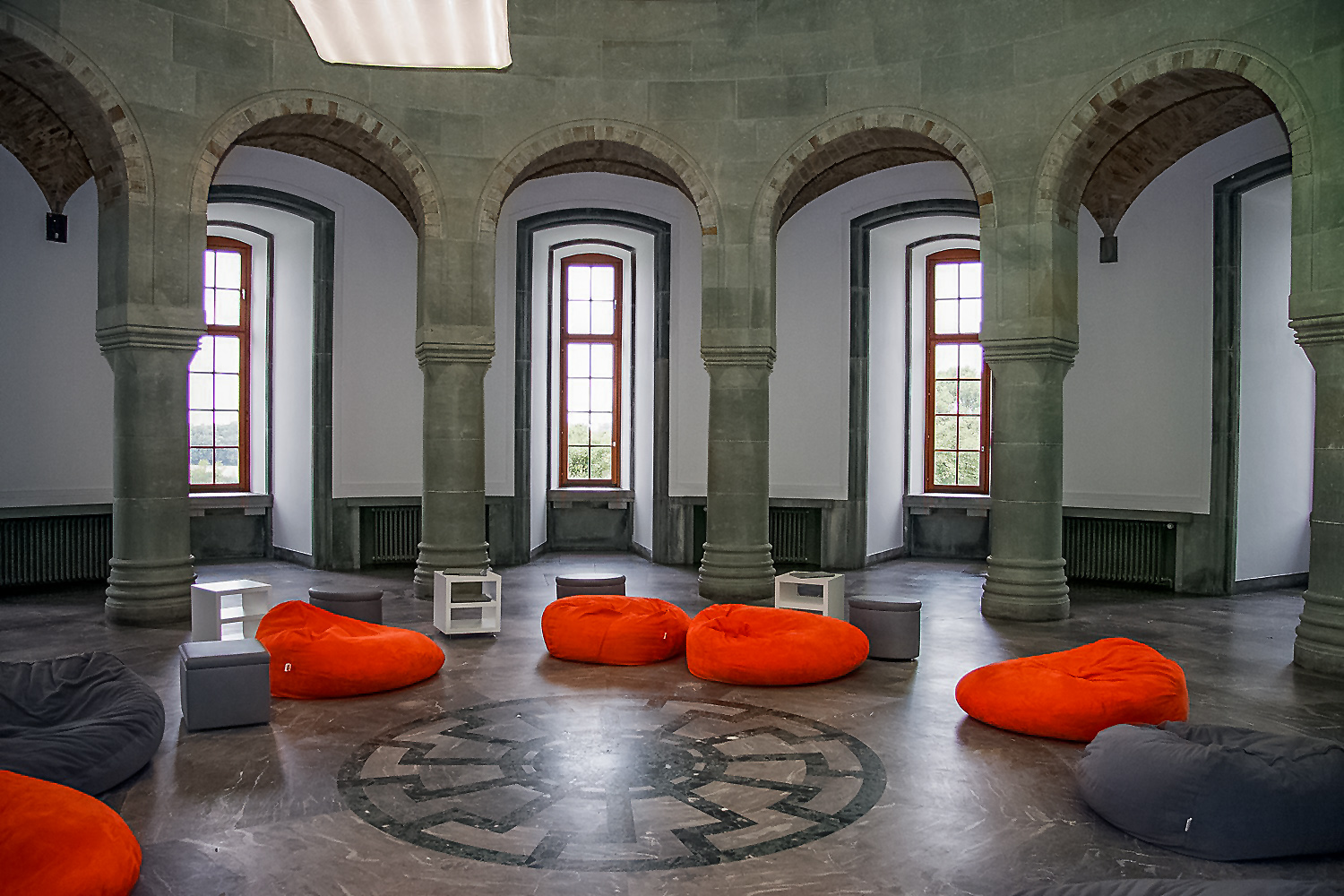
The mosaic in Wewelsburg, where the symbol originates

The symbol that later became known as the "black sun" originated in the early 20th century, with the first depiction being the Wewelsburg mosaic. In 1933, Heinrich Himmler, the head of the SS, acquired Wewelsburg, a castle near Paderborn in the German region of Westphalia. Himmler intended to make the building into a center for the SS, and between 1936 and 1942, Himmler ordered the building expanded and rebuilt for ceremonial purposes. Himmler's remodeling included the Wewelsburg mosaic that was composed of twelve dark-green radially overlaid Sig runes, such as those employed in the logo of the SS, on the white marble floor of the structure's north tower known as the "General's Hall" (Obergruppenführersaal). (Note: Nicholas Goodrick-Clarke describes this "unique SS sun wheel design" as "a black disk surrounded by twelve radial sig-runes".)

Although today referred to as the Black Sun, the Wewelsburg motif is itself notably not black and the intended significance of the image remains unknown. As scholar Daniele Seipe summarizes, "There are no known sources from the National Socialist period that provide information about the meaning of the symbol intended at that time or about its name."

== Neo-Nazism and the far right ==
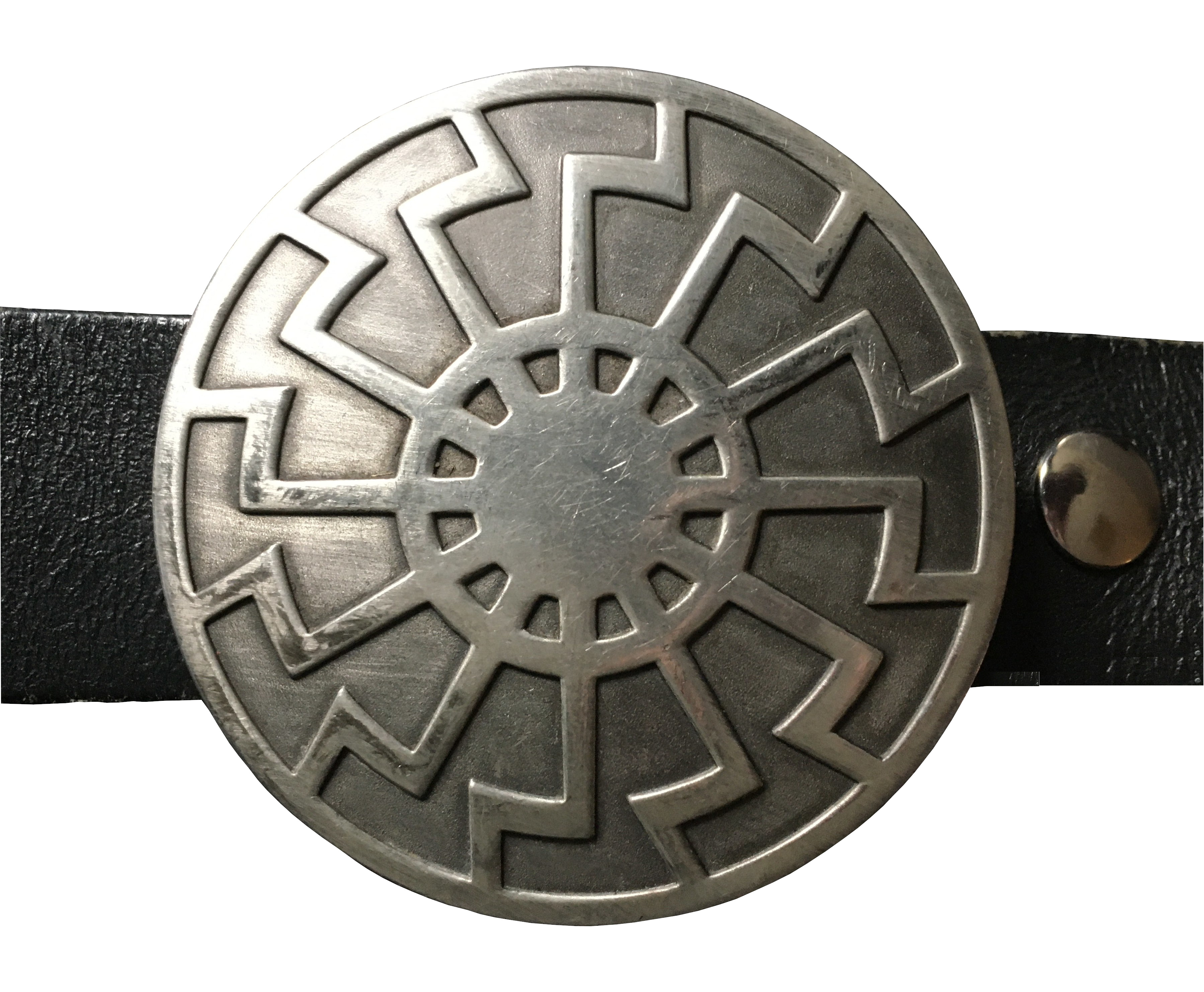
A leather belt with the black sun symbol as belt buckle. The item is from the 2010s.

In the late 20th century, the Black Sun symbol became widely used by neo-fascists, neo-Nazis, the far-right and white nationalists. The symbol often appears on extremist flags, t-shirts, posters, and websites and in extremist publications associated with such groups. Modern far-right groups often refer to the symbol as the sun wheel or Sonnenrad.

The name "Black Sun" came into wider use after the publication of a 1991 occult thriller novel, Die Schwarze Sonne von Tashi Lhunpo (The Black Sun of Tashi Lhunpo), by the pseudonymous author Russell McCloud. The book links the Wewelsburg mosaic with the neo-Nazi concept of the "Black Sun", invented by former SS officer Wilhelm Landig as a substitute for the Nazi swastika and a symbol for a mystic energy source that was supposed to renew the Aryan race.

A number of far-right groups and individuals have utilised the symbol in their propaganda, including the perpetrator behind the Christchurch mosque shootings, Brenton Tarrant, and the Australian neo-Nazi group Antipodean Resistance, and the symbol was displayed by members of several extremist groups involved in the Unite the Right rally in Charlottesville, Virginia.

Along with other symbols from the Nazi era such as the Wolfsangel, the Sig Armanen rune, and the Totenkopf, the black sun is employed by some neo-Nazi adherents of Satanism. Scholar Chris Mathews writes:

The Black Sun motif is even less ambiguous. Though based on medieval German symbols, the Wewelsburg mosaic is a unique design commissioned specifically for Himmler, and its primary contemporary association is Nazi occultism, for which Nazi Satanic groups and esoteric neo-Nazis adopt it.

In May 2022, the perpetrator of the 2022 Buffalo shooting, a white supremacist, wore the Black Sun symbol on his body armor and placed it on the front of his digital manifesto.

On 1 September 2022, Fernando André Sabag Montiel, who has a Black Sun tattoo on his arm, attempted to assassinate Argentine vice president Cristina Fernández de Kirchner.

In July 2023, a member of the Ron DeSantis 2024 presidential campaign produced and shared a video on Twitter containing the Black Sun. The video was quickly retracted after garnering media attention and backlash, and the aide was fired.

== Azov Brigade ==
Former badge of the Azov Brigade, which used a Black Sun and the National Idea symbol in the forefront

The Ukrainian Azov Brigade, founded in 2014, used the symbol as part of its logo in 2014-2015; it was later removed. Political scientist Ivan Gomza wrote in Krytyka that the Nazi connotations of the symbol in that logo are lost on most people in Ukraine, and the logo rather has an association with "a successful fighting unit that protects Ukraine." WotanJugend, a neo-Nazi group based in Kyiv and connected to the broader Azov political movement, has also used the Black Sun symbol to promote its group. In 2022, during the Russian invasion of Ukraine, NATO tweeted a photo of a female Ukrainian soldier for International Women's Day. The soldier wore a symbol on her uniform that "appears to be the black sun symbol". After receiving complaints from social media users, NATO removed the tweet and stated "The post was removed when we realised it contained a symbol that we could not verify as official".

== Other uses ==
According to the Freedom House initiative Reporting Radicalism, the Black Sun is also used by some modern pagan and satanist groups as an esoteric symbol. They further note that it is sometimes used as a fashionable, aesthetic symbol or misunderstood as having origins in ancient Scandinavian or Slavic cultures. The Anti-Defamation League stated that though the symbol is popular with white supremacists, imagery resembling the black sun features in many cultures, and should be analysed in the context it appears, and not necessarily interpreted as a sign of white supremacy or racism.

The Colombian singer Shakira inadvertently sold a necklace with the symbol engraved during her 2018 "El Dorado" tour, under the impression that it was an ancient pre-Columbian symbol. Fans noticed the error and alerted her team, and the necklace was subsequently pulled down from the store.

The perpetrator of the terrorist attack on two mosques in Christchurch, Brenton Tarrant, used an image widely circulated on the far-right forum 8chan on the cover of his manifesto, “The Great Replacement.” The image features a black sun at the center of a circle divided into eight sectors, which are said to symbolize the eight principles of white supremacy. On the back, the black sun was superimposed in the center of eight photos.

== See also ==
- Esotericism in Germany and Austria
- Fascist symbolism
- Irminsul § Wilhelm Teudt, the Externsteine, and symbol
- List of symbols designated by the Anti-Defamation League as hate symbols
- List of occult symbols
- Nazi symbolism
- Sun cross
- Thule-Seminar
