= George J. Roskruge =

Surveyor General of Arizona Territory (1845–1928)

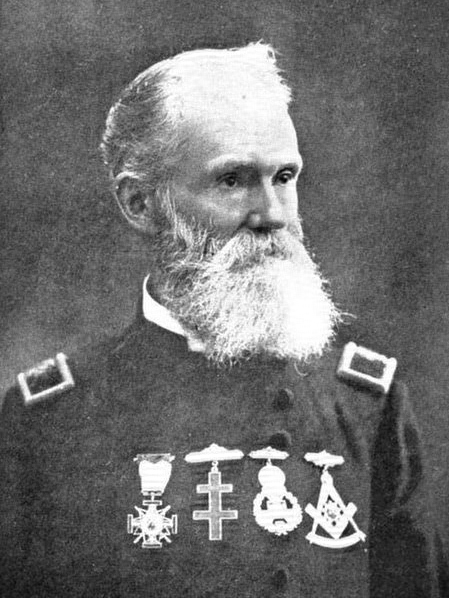

United States Surveyor General of the Arizona Territory
- In office 1896–1897

Chief clerk of the United States Surveyor General of the Arizona Territory
- In office 1893–1896

City engineer of Tucson, Arizona
- In office 1896–1894

County surveyor of Pima County
- In office 1894–1890

United States deputy land and mineral surveyor
- In office 1880–1889

Chief draftsman for the Surveyor General of Arizona
- In office 1874–1889

Assistant county recorder for Yavapai County
- In office 1873–1874

Member or President of the Tucson Board of education
- In office 1881 – 1914 (not continuous)

Member of the Arizona Board of Regents
- In office 1887 – 1911 (not continuous)

Personal details
- Born: April 10, 1845 near Helston, Cornwall, England
- Died: July 27, 1928 (aged 83)
- Resting place: Masonic Cemetery, Tucson
- Affiliations: President, Association of Civil Engineers of Arizona; Member, American Society of Irrigation Engineers; VP (1888) and P (1889), Tucson Building and Loan Association; President of the Tucson Rifle Club
- Namesakes: Roskruge Mountains; Roskruge School; Roskruge Hotel

George James Roskruge (April 10, 1845 (Note: Some sources list Roskruge's year of birth as 1834.) – July 27, 1928) was the surveyor general of Arizona Territory from 1896 to 1897. Born in England, he emigrated to the United States in his mid-20s and became a naturalized citizen in 1876. He spent most of his life in Tucson, Arizona, where he held many prominent positions and is considered a city pioneer. He was an expert rifleman and is called the "father of Masonry" in Arizona.

== Early life ==
Roskruge was born on April 10, 1845, near Helston, Cornwall, England, where he began working at age 15 as a messenger for a law office. Beginning April 12, 1860, he served for 10 years in the Duke of Cornwall's rifle volunteers, where he became known as a "remarkably accurate rifle shot" and for two years was the champion rifle shot of his company.

He emigrated to the United States in 1870, arriving in New York and then traveling for five days with only cheese, crackers, and bread to eat, to Denver, Colorado, where he lived and worked for two years. In May 1872, he left for the Arizona Territory in a party of 17. The journey included shortages of food and water, and encounters with hostile Apache Indians. After camping at Volunteer Springs (near present-day Bellemont, Arizona), he walked three and one-half days alone from there to Prescott in June 1872, as his companions were too sick and weak to continue. (Note: One account also attributed to Roskruge himself make no mention of walking alone or his companions being rescued by Masons.) (Note: An account told by Roskruge to the Arizona State Historian said he made the trip with three others and upon reaching Prescott, asked General Crook to send soldiers to rescue two others who did not return to camp after leaving to hunt for food. Crook refused citing the number of hostile Indians but provided horses and equipment. Roskruge and three others went back and found the two men.) He soon found work as a cook and packer for Omar H. Case, Deputy Surveyor General, and began assisting in surveying work as a chainman. In 1873, he was appointed assistant county recorder for Yavapai County.

== Surveyor ==
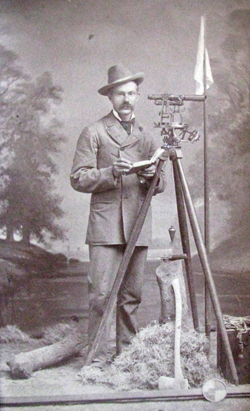
Roskruge with surveying transit, undated

He relocated to Tucson, arriving on July 22, 1874 where he prepared maps and field notes and then became chief draftsman for John Wasson, Surveyor General of Arizona.

He was in that position until appointed a United States deputy land and mineral surveyor in 1880. Subsequently, he was the county surveyor of Pima County for four years and city engineer of Tucson for three years. Roskruge became the chief clerk of the Surveyor General of the United States on July 1, 1893, and Surveyor General of Arizona from 1896 to 1897 as appointed by President Grover Cleveland. It was his belief that he was the only person without a college education to hold this position.

Roskruge produced a hand-drawn detailed topographical map of Pima County, officially adopted on July 22, 1883. (Note: An "Official Map of Pima County" carries an 1893 copyright, most sources refer to his 1893 map) The map measured 4 by 8 feet (1.2 m × 2.4 m) and showed "every stream, arroya, road, town, river, and mountain range" in the county. The map was the reference for later maps, and was characterized decades later as "a remarkable piece of work". Forty-seven years later, it was framed under glass and hung in the office of the current county engineer.

Roskruge was appointed superintendent of irrigating ditches for the Papago Indian Reservation in San Xavier by President Chester Arthur, and later appointed special inspector of public surveys by President Cleveland.

Roskruge laid out the grid pattern for the streets of Tucson in 1902.

=== Places named ===
Roskruge named Kitt Peak, the highest point in the Quinlan Mountains of southern Arizona and home of the Kitt Peak National Observatory, for his sister, Mary Phillippa Roskruge Kitt. (Note: On his 1893 Pima County Survey map, Roskruge spelled the name 'Kits'. At the request of the wife of George F. Kitt, the spelling was changed by decision in 1930.) (Note: An alternate story says he took the name from a man on his survey crew named Kit.)

He named the Roskruge Mountains, a 22-mile (35 km)-long range approximately 20 miles (32 km) west of Tucson, after himself. Also has ROSKRUGE K-8 NAMED AFTER HIM

== Private positions ==
He was vice-president (1888) and president (1889) of the Tucson Building and Loan Association.

In 1891, Roskruge became chairman of the newly formed the Santa Cruz Water Storage Company. Selim M. Franklin, a former Territorial Representative credited with securing the University of Arizona for Tucson was the counsel and William "Billy" Breakenridge, who later popularized the Gunfight at the O.K. Corral was chief engineer. The company planned to construct a series of dams, reservoirs, and a 70-mile (110 km) canal to divert the Santa Cruz River to irrigate 75,000 to 300,000 acres (30,000 to 121,000 ha) of land and add "millions to the wealth of Pima County." Due to financial irregularities and the financial panic of 1893–1897, the canal was not built.

== Educational positions ==
Roskruge was a trustee of the first school built in Tucson, in 1874. This building was designed by Roskruge and named after him.

He was a member and President of the Tucson Board of education several times between 1881 and 1914. He resigned once after the "great teacher scandal of 1906", an incident where five female school teachers were caught smoking cigarettes and drinking wine in the presence of men in Sabino Canyon. Roskruge felt that the teachers' action violated their "duty to provide mental and moral guidance for their students at all times". He called for either their resignation or their suspension, but the other board members did not support him, so Roskruge resigned from the board in protest. He was re-elected to the board a few years later.

He was a member of the Arizona Board of Regents (1887–1889) during the administration of Governor Zulick, and again (1903–1911) under Governors Brodie, Kibbey, and Sloan.

== Professional associations ==
In 1897, he was the first elected president of the Association of Civil Engineers of Arizona and was a member of the American Society of Irrigation Engineers.

He was a member of the Archaeological Association of Arizona and investigated the state's pre-historic culture. He made many photographs of the Tumacacori mission in 1889, later donated to the Arizona Historical Society.

== Masonry ==
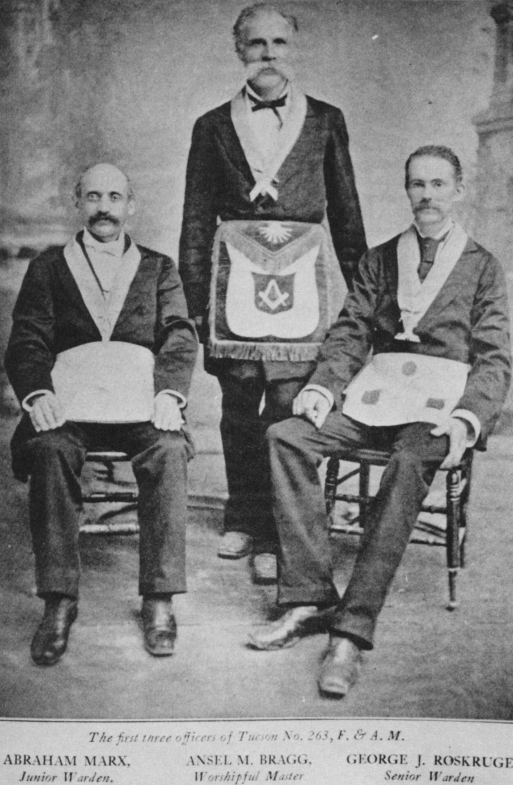
Tucson Masonic Lodge officers, c. 1881 (Roskruge on right)

Roskruge has an extensive association with Masonry, having been called the "father of Masonry" in Arizona. He was made a Master Mason in 1870 in his birthplace of Helston, Cornwall, England. He claimed that when he arrived in Prescott in 1872, he went to the Masonic lodge there and identified himself with the secret Masonic sign. His Masonic brothers rescued his stranded traveling companions and helped him find work in Prescott. After relocating to Tucson, Roskruge was instrumental in founding lodges there and eventually became Grand Secretary of the Royal Arch Masons of Arizona.

== Honors ==
In 1998, the Tucson/Pima Arts Council awarded Steve Farley $171,000 to create tile murals for the walls of the underpass of Broadway Boulevard at the Aviation Parkway in downtown Tucson. The murals are based on historical photographs; the mural on one wall to be of a c. 1920 photograph of Roskruge standing at Broadway and Stone.

Tucson's first high school, which opened in 1907, was also named for him. In 1923, the high school moved to a new location and the building became the Roskruge Junior High School. It later became an elementary school and is still in use as the Roskruge Bilingual K-8 School. Roskruge himself protested against giving the school his name.

The Roskruge Hotel, at Broadway and Scott Avenue, opened in 1924. It was owned by Freemasons and was named to honor Roskruge, the "father of Masonry in Arizona". At the time, it was one of the "most modern small hotels in Arizona" with each room having hot and cold running water and a shower.

The library at the Masonic Temple in downtown Phoenix is named the George Roskruge & S. Barry Casey Masonic Memorial Library & Museum.

== Death ==
He died July 27, 1928, in his Tucson home after suffering from an illness for several months. His funeral was held per his wishes at the Masonic temple, with services conducted by the Grand Masonic lodge of Arizona with a guard of the Knights Templar. Flags at the University of Arizona, public schools and other public buildings were flown at half-mast after his death. He was buried at the Masonic Cemetery in Tucson, and an endowment fund was created to pay for a perpetual memorial wreath to be placed each year on May 9, the anniversary of the day Roskruge received his thirty-second degree.

== Personal ==
Roskruge married Lena Wood, a California native in May 1896. They had no children. Wood had moved to Tucson in 1875, and died there on September 16, 1937.

His house, built in 1896 at 318 E 13th Street, is a Queen Anne style house that is a contributing property of the Armory Park Historic Residential District in Tucson. As of 1976, it was owned by his niece.

His marksman skills were still quite sharp at age 65. In 1910, he accompanied five young men from the Tucson Rifle club attempting to qualify as marksmen in the National Guard. Roskruge shot better than all of the five, only two of whom qualified. He had never shot before at the 500-yard (460 m) distance and still made 44 of 50 shots on target, including four bullseyes.

He served as president of the Tucson Rifle Club, secretary of the Arizona Rifle Association, and state secretary for Arizona of the National Rifle Association of America.

When he was the President of the Tucson Rifle club, he secured a land grant from the federal government, signed by President Woodrow Wilson, for 360 acres (150 ha) for a rifle range. He contributed to the allied effort in World War I by training over 500 men on this range who joined the U.S. Army.

== Gallery ==
Roskruge's official map of Pima County
