= Artesa =

Artesa may refer to

== Populated places ==
- Artesa, Arizona, a populated place in Pima County, Arizona, United States
- Artesa de Lleida, in the comarca of Segrià, Catalonia, Spain
- Artesa de Segre, in the comarca of Noguera, Catalonia, Spain

== Others ==
- The Spanish word for a bread trough
