= Artesa, Arizona =

- Populated place
- Location of Artesa in Arizona
- Coordinates: 31°53′58″N 111°51′08″W
- Country: United States
- State: Arizona
- County: Pima
- Elevation: 2,477 ft (755 m)
- Time zone: UTC-7 (Mountain (MST))
  - Summer (DST): UTC-7 (MST)
- ZIP codes: 85634
- Area code: 520
- FIPS code: 04-04230
- GNIS feature ID: 24310

Artesa is a Tohono O'odham village located in Pima County, Arizona in the area of the Baboquivari Peak Wilderness on the Tohono O'odham Nation Indian Reservation. The village was established in 1907. It has an estimated elevation of 2,477 feet (755 m) above sea level. Kumkachutz Wawasit or Komoktetuvávosit is its traditional name, which means "Where the turtle was caught" in the O'odham, or Papago, language.
