= Landig Group =

Neo-völkisch occult circle

- Nickname: Landig Circle
- Formation: 1950; 76 years ago
- Founder: Wilhelm Landig
- Founded at: Vienna, Austria
- Type: Occultist and neo-völkisch group

The Landig Group (Austrian German: Landig Gruppe) was an occultist and neo-völkisch group formed in 1950, that first gathered for discussions at the studio of the designer Wilhelm Landig in the Margareten district of Vienna. The circle's most prominent and influential members were Wilhelm Landig (1909–1997), Erich Halik (Claude Schweighardt) and Rudolf J. Mund (1920–1985). The circle has also been referred to as the Landig Circle (Landig Kreis), Vienna Group (Wien Konzern) and Vienna Lodge (Wien Lodge).

== Background ==
Landig was the founder of the group, which has since inspired decades of völkisch mysticism. He and his group discussed and developed ideas concerning Thule, Atlantis, the Arctic, Tibet, and esoteric interpretations of National-Socialism.

The concept of Black Sun (Schwarze Sonne or sol niger) was already present in esoteric and neo-Nazi circles during the 1950s, particularly in writings by Erich Halik published in the esoteric periodical Mensch und Schicksal. The motif itself, however, was considerably older and had a history in alchemy, literature and art predating the Landig circle. Landig subsequently incorporated and developed these ideas in his Thule trilogy. In Götzen gegen Thule (1971), the Black Sun is used as the emblem of a fictional post-war German enclave; the novel describes a black point as a replacement for the Balkenkreuz and identifies it with the sol niger, or Black Sun. Within the novel, the Black Sun is also associated with an esoteric source of energy and with the regeneration of the Aryan race.

Landig and other propagandists of esoteric-Nazism have circulated wild stories about German Nazi colonies that live and work in secret installations beneath the polar ice caps, where they developed flying saucers and miracle weapons such as Die Glocke after the demise of the Third Reich. These stories include the theory that flying saucers were Nazi secret weapons launched from an underground base in Antarctica, from which the Nazis hoped to conquer the world.

The focus of the group's discussions was a secret center in the Arctic known as the Blue Island, which could serve as a source point for a renaissance of traditional life. This idea was taken from Julius Evola, whose Revolt Against the Modern World became the bible of the Landig group.

More so, or at least equally as important to the group as Evola's book, the Vienna Group hungrily devoured the ideas and books of Herman Wirth.

== Wilhelm Landig ==
Landig was a former SS member and author. He was born on 20 December 1909. He wrote the Thule trilogy Götzen gegen Thule (1971), Wolfszeit um Thule (1980) and Rebellen für Thule – Das Erbe von Atlantis (1991). He contributed to the development of postwar neo-Nazi and völkisch concepts such as the Black Sun as a substitute swastika and mythical source of energy, idea which was relaunched in the 1991 novel Die Schwarze Sonne von Tashi Lhunpo by ghostwriter Russell McCloud.

== Continuities ==
It has been shown that a younger generation continued the development of the circle's ideas from the 1980s on. This younger generation consisted of members of the German/Austrian Tempelhofgesellschaft. Their publications demonstrate an exchange of ideas with the older generation, mainly revolving around the Black Sun concept. After the Tempelhofgesellschaft had been dissolved, it was succeeded by the Causa Nostra, a Freundeskreis (circle of friends) that remains active.

== See also ==
- Black Sun (symbol)
- Occultism in Nazism
- Nicholas Goodrick-Clarke
- Hollow Earth
- Esoteric Nazism
- Nazi archaeology
- Vril § Vril Society
- Thule Society
