= Quinlan Mountains =

Landform in Pima County, Arizona

- Location within Arizona

Highest point
- Peak: Kitt Peak
- Elevation: 6,883 ft (2,098 m)
- Coordinates: 31°57′50″N 111°35′59″W

Dimensions
- Length: 25 mi (40 km) (NNW x SSE)-curves to southeast

Geography
- Country: United States
- State: Arizona
- County: Pima
- Range coordinates: 31°57′44″N 111°36′53″W
- Borders on: Baboquivari Mountains

The Quinlan Mountains is a mountain range in the U.S. state of Arizona. Its highest point is Kitt Peak at 6,883 feet (2,098 m), which is also the second-highest peak on the Tohono O'odham Indian Reservation, after Baboquivari Peak. The range lies on the eastern end of the reservation about 55 miles (89 km) southwest of Tucson.

The Quinlan Mountains are north of the Baboquivari Mountains, the two ranges separated by the pass at the head of the Pavo Kug Wash. The Quinlan range also sits southwest of the Coyote Mountains, separated from them by the Pan Tak Pass. When George J. Roskruge created the official map of Pima County in 1893, he named the range after James Quinlin, who had opened a stagecoach station in the nearby town of Quinlin in 1884. Although the range had also been known as the Quinlin or Quinuin mountains at different points in history, Quinlan became the official name as a result of a decision by the Board on Geographic Names on April 16, 1941.
