= Solar symbol =

Symbol representing the Sun

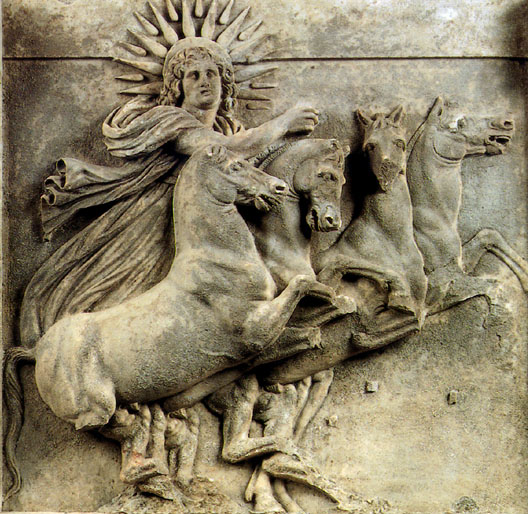
Helios with a radiate halo driving his chariot (Ilion, 4th century BC; Pergamon Museum)

A solar symbol is a symbol representing the Sun. Common solar symbols include circles (with or without rays), crosses, and spirals. In religious iconography, personifications of the Sun or solar attributes are often indicated by means of a halo or a radiate crown.

When the systematic study of comparative mythology first became popular in the 19th century, scholarly opinion tended to over-interpret historical myths and iconography in terms of "solar symbolism". This was especially the case with Max Müller and his followers beginning in the 1860s in the context of Indo-European studies. Many "solar symbols" claimed in the 19th century, such as the swastika, triskele, Sun cross, etc. have tended to be interpreted more conservatively in scholarship since the later 20th century.

== Solar disk ==
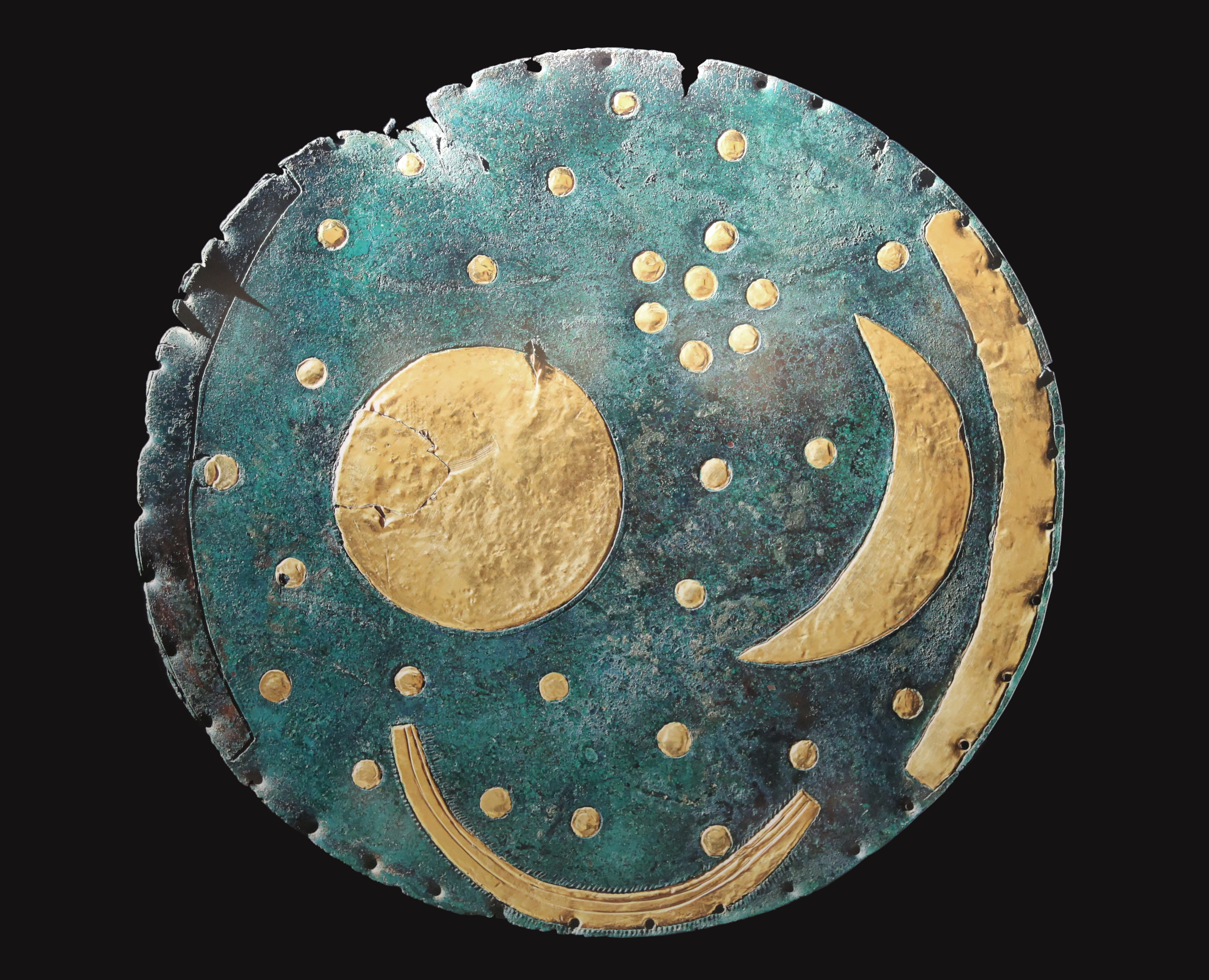
The solar disk, crescent Moon and stars as shown on the Nebra sky disk (c. 1600 BC)

The basic element of most solar symbols is the circular solar disk.

The disk can be modified in various ways, notably by adding rays (found in the Bronze Age in Egyptian depictions of Aten) or a cross. In the ancient Near East, the solar disk could also be modified by addition of the Uraeus (rearing cobra), and in ancient Mesopotamia it was shown with wings.

=== Bronze Age writing ===
The sun disk used in ancient Egypt as the crown for Ra and other gods

Egyptian hieroglyphs have a large inventory of solar symbolism because of the central position of solar deities (Ra, Horus, Aten etc.) in ancient Egyptian religion.

The main logogram for "Sun" was a representation of the solar disk, N5 (Gardiner N5), with or without a dot or circle in the center, with a variant including the Uraeus, N6 (N6).

The "Sun" logogram in early Chinese writing, beginning with the oracle bone script (c. 12th century BC) also shows the solar disk with a central dot (analogous to the Egyptian hieroglyph); under the influence of the writing brush, this character evolved into a square shape (modern 日).

=== Classical era ===
The disk with a ray as a symbol for the Sun in late Classical (4th c.) and medieval Byzantine (11th c.) mss

In the Greek and European world, until approximately the 16th century, the astrological symbol for the Sun was a disk with a single ray, (U+1F71A 🜚 ALCHEMICAL SYMBOL FOR GOLD). This is the form, for example, in Johannes Kamateros' 12th century Compendium of Astrology.

=== Astronomical symbol ===
The modern astronomical symbol for the Sun, a circled dot (U+2609 ☉ SUN), was first used in the Renaissance.

== Rayed depictions ==
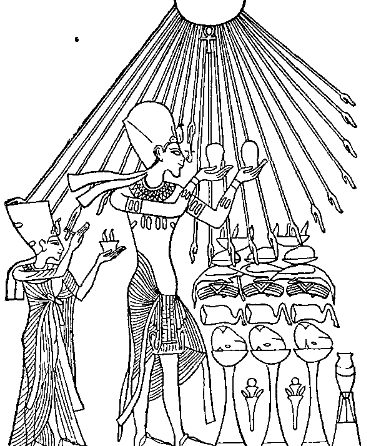
Akhenaten worshipping Aten (14th century BC; 1903 drawing)

A circular disk with alternating triangular and wavy rays emanating from it is a frequent symbol or artistic depiction of the sun.

=== Antiquity ===
The ancient Mesopotamian "star of Shamash" could be represented with either eight wavy rays, or with four wavy and four triangular rays.

The Vergina Sun (also known as the Star of Vergina, Macedonian Star, or Argead Star) is a rayed solar symbol appearing in ancient Greek art from the 6th to 2nd centuries BC. The Vergina Sun appears in art variously with sixteen, twelve, or eight triangular rays.

Bianchini's planisphere, produced in the 2nd century, has a circlet with rays radiating from it.

=== Sun with face ===
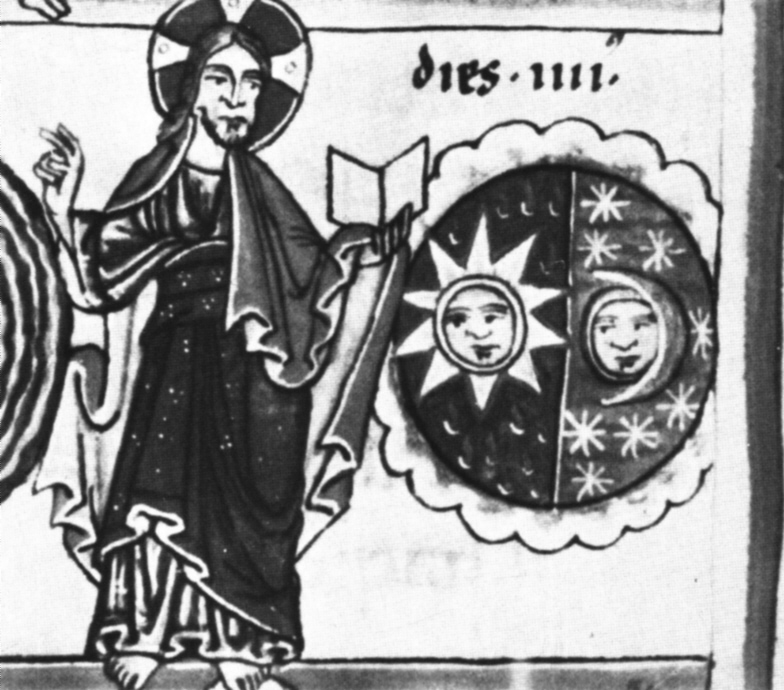
Sun (ten rays) and Moon with faces in a manuscript miniature illustrating the fourth day of creation (12 C.)

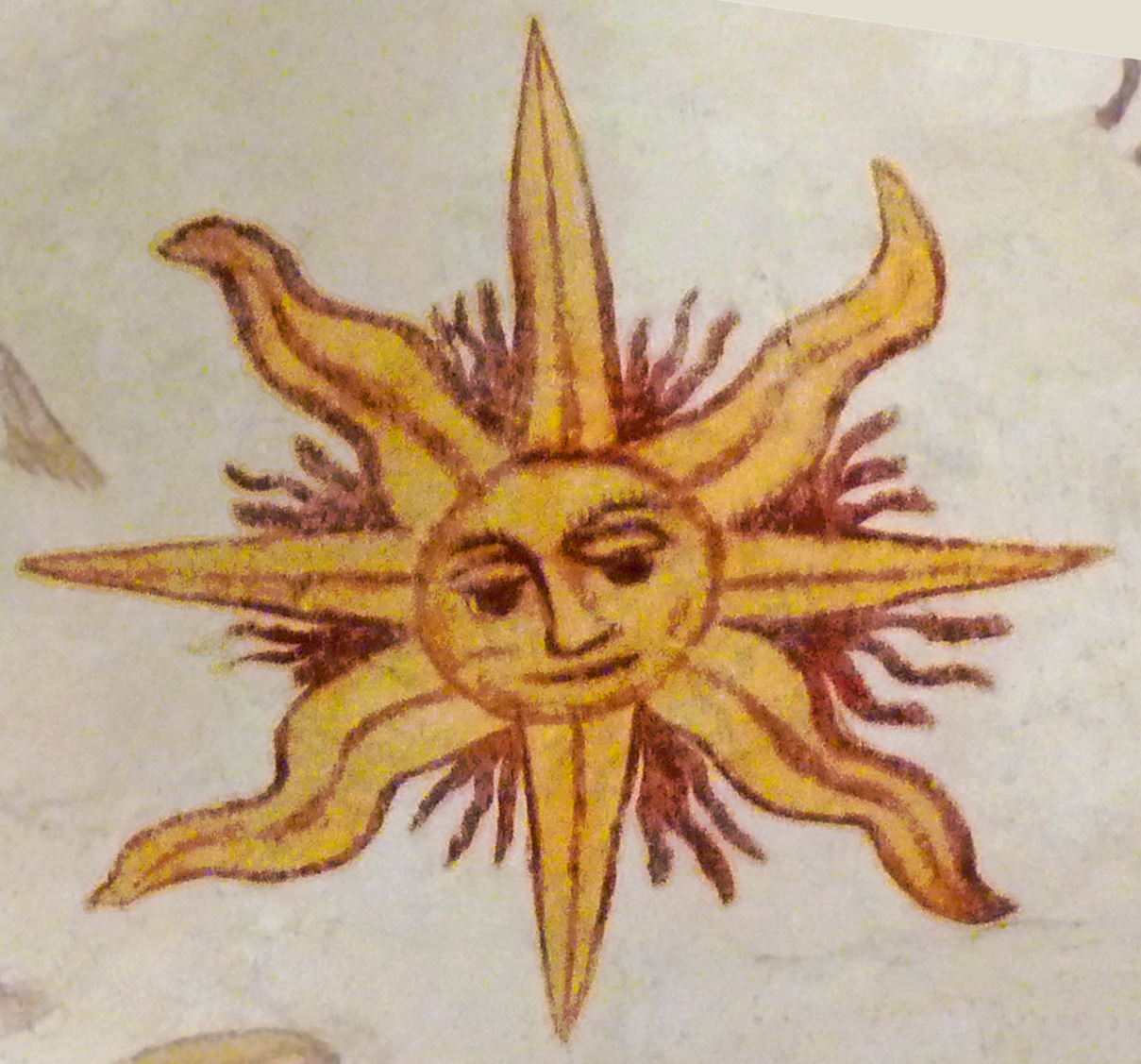
Sun with a face and eight (alternating triangular and wavy) rays (fresco in Larbey, France, dated c. 1610)

Rayed depictions of the Sun with a human face are a Western iconographic tradition which became current in the Early Modern period.

The iconographic tradition of depicting the Sun with rays and with a human face developed in Western tradition in the High Middle Ages and became widespread in the Renaissance, harking back to the Sun god (Sol/Helios) wearing a radiate crown in classical antiquity.

=== Sunburst ===
The sunburst was the badge of King Edward III of England, and has thus become the badge of office of the Windsor Herald.

=== Modern pictogram ===
Typical "clear weather" pictogram (triangular rays)

The modern pictogram representing the Sun as a circle with rays, often eight in number (indicated by either straight lines or triangles; Unicode Miscellaneous Symbols ☀ U+2600; ☼ U+263C) indicates "clear weather" in weather forecasts, originally in television forecasts in the 1970s. The Unicode 6.0 Miscellaneous Symbols and Pictographs (October 2010) block introduced another set of weather pictograms, including "white sun" without rays 1F323 🌣, as well as "sun with face" U+1F31E 🌞︎︎.

Two pictograms resembling the Sun with rays are used to represent the settings of luminance in display devices. They have been encoded in Unicode since version 6.0 in the Miscellaneous Symbols and Pictographs block under U+1505 as "low brightness symbol" (🔅) and U+1F506 as "high brightness symbol" (🔆).

== Crosses ==
The "sun cross", "solar cross", or "wheel cross" (🜨) is often considered to represent the four seasons and the tropical year, and therefore the Sun (though as an astronomical symbol it represented the Earth). (Note: Since at least 1988, the International Astronomical Union has deprecated use of planetary symbols in journal articles.The IAU Style Manual (PDF). The International Astrophysical Union. 1989. p. 27. Archived (PDF) from the original on 21 June 2018.) In the prehistoric religion of Bronze Age Europe, crosses in circles appear frequently on artifacts identified as cult items. An example from the Nordic Bronze Age is the "miniature standard" with amber inlay revealing a cross shape when held against the light (National Museum of Denmark). The Bronze Age symbol has also been connected with the spoked chariot wheel, which at the time was four-spoked (compare the Linear B ideogram 243 "wheel" 𐃏). In the context of a culture that celebrated the Sun chariot, the wheel may thus have had a solar connotation (cf. the Trundholm sun chariot).

The Arevakhach ("solar cross") symbol often found in Armenian memorial stelae is claimed as an ancient Armenian solar symbol of eternity and light.

Some Sámi shaman drums have the Beaivi Sámi sun symbol that resembles a sun cross.

The swastika has been a long-standing symbol of good fortune in Eurasian cultures: its appropriation by the Nazi Party from 1920 to 1945 is a brief moment in its history. It may be derived from the sun cross, and is another solar symbol in some contexts. It is used among Buddhists (manji), Jains, and Hindus; and many other cultures, though not necessarily as a solar symbol.

The "Black Sun" (German: Schwarze Sonne) is a 'sun wheel' with twelve-fold rotational symmetry. The design was incorporated as a mosaic into a floor of Wewelsburg Castle during the Nazi era and may have been inspired by Alemannic Iron Age swastika-like designs in Migration-period Zierscheiben. It has been adopted by modern Satanist groups and neo-Nazis.

The "Kolovrat", or in Polish Słoneczko, represents the Sun in Slavic neopaganism.

Sun crosses
Sun cross

Triskelion

Sun cross form of swastika, official symbol of the German Faith Movement (1934–1945)

Slavic Kolovrat/Słoneczko

Black Sun, a Nazi design

== Modern flags and emblems ==
Official insignia which incorporate rayed solar symbols include the flag of Uruguay, the flag of Kiribati, some versions of the flag of Argentina, the Irish Defence Forces cap badge, and the 1959–1965 coat of arms of Iraq.

The depictions of the sun on the flags of the Republic of China (Taiwan), Kazakhstan, Kurdistan, the Brazilian state of Pernambuco, and Nepal have only straight (triangular) rays; that of Kyrgyzstan has only curvy rays; while that of the Philippines has short diverging rays grouped into threes.

Another rayed form of the sun has simple radial lines dividing the background into two colors, as in the military flags of Japan and the flag of North Macedonia, and in the top parts of the flags of Tibet and Arizona.

The flag of New Mexico is based on the Zia sun symbol which has four groups of four parallel rays emanating symmetrically from a central circle.

National or state flags
Flag of Argentina

Flag of Arizona (USA)

Flag of the Republic of China (Taiwan)

Flag of the Japan Ground Self-Defense Force

Flag of Kazakhstan

Flag of Kiribati

Flag of Kurdistan

Flag of Nepal

Flag of New Mexico (USA)

Flag of North Macedonia

Flag of the Philippines

Flag of Tibet

Flag of Uruguay

Flag of Pernambuco (Brazil)

== Code points in Unicode ==
- U+2609 ☉ SUN
- U+2600 ☀ BLACK SUN WITH RAYS (A more accurate term might be "solid colour". The actual colour is an implementation choice, for example ☀, ☀.)
- U+263C ☼ WHITE SUN WITH RAYS (A more accurate term might be "outlined". The actual colour is an implementation choice.)
- U+1F728 🜨 ALCHEMICAL SYMBOL FOR VERDIGRIS
- U+1F323 🌣 WHITE SUN (A more accurate term might be "outlined". The actual colour is an implementation choice.)
- U+1F31E 🌞 SUN WITH FACE
- U+1F506 🔆 HIGH BRIGHTNESS SYMBOL
- U+1F71A 🜚 ALCHEMICAL SYMBOL FOR GOLD
- U+2F47 ⽇ KANGXI RADICAL SUN
- U+131F3 𓇳 EGYPTIAN HIEROGLYPH N005
- U+131F4 𓇴 EGYPTIAN HIEROGLYPH N006
- U+2299 ⊙ CIRCLED DOT OPERATOR

== See also ==
- Astrological symbols – Symbols denoting astrological concepts
- Astronomical symbols – Symbols in astronomy
- Beaivi – Sami sun-deity, name of sun in Sami
- Black Sun (symbol) – Neo-Nazi and esoteric symbol
- Blue Sky with a White Sun – National emblem of the Republic of China
- Lauburu – Basque swastika
- Monad (Greek philosophy) – Philosophical concept of a most basic substance, or supreme being
- Self in Jungian psychology – Psychological concept
- Solar deity – Sky deity who represents the Sun
- The Sun in culture
- Sun (heraldry) – Symbolic form used in heraldry
- Sun of May – National emblem of Argentina and Uruguay
- Vergina Sun – Rayed solar symbol
- Winged sun – Symbol of divinity, royalty and power
