= 2059 Baboquivari =

Near-Earth asteroid of the Amor group

Discovery
- Discovered by: Indiana University (Indiana Asteroid Program)
- Discovery site: Goethe Link Obs.
- Discovery date: 16 October 1963

Designations
- Named after: Baboquivari Mountains (U.S. state of Arizona)
- Alternative designations: 1963 UA
- Minor planet category: Amor · NEO · (1+KM)

Orbital characteristics
- Epoch 4 September 2017 (JD 2458000.5)
- Uncertainty parameter 0
- Observation arc: 53.51 yr (19,545 days)
- Aphelion: 4.0580 AU
- Perihelion: 1.2460 AU
- Semi-major axis: 2.6520 AU
- Eccentricity: 0.5302
- Orbital period (sidereal): 4.32 yr (1,577 days)
- Mean anomaly: 176.48°
- Mean motion: 0° 13^{m} 41.52^{s} / day
- Inclination: 11.076°
- Longitude of ascending node: 200.92°
- Argument of perihelion: 191.73°
- Earth MOID: 0.2537 AU · 98.8 LD

Physical characteristics
- Dimensions: 1.9 km (est. at 0.20)
- Absolute magnitude (H): 16.0

2059 Baboquivari, provisional designation 1963 UA, is an asteroid classified as near-Earth object of the Amor group, approximately 1.9 kilometers in diameter. Discovered by the Indiana Asteroid Program in 1963, it was later named after the Baboquivari Mountains in Arizona, United States.

== Discovery and recovery ==
Baboquivari is one of the lowest numbered near-Earth asteroids as it was already discovered on 16 October 1963. The discovery observation was made by the Indiana Asteroid Program at Goethe Link Observatory near Brooklyn, Indiana, in the United States. Three months later, it became a lost asteroid until June 1976, when it was recovered by the Steward Observatory's 90-inch Bok Telescope at Kitt Peak National Observatory located in the Sonoran Desert of Arizona.

== Classification and orbit ==
Baboquivari is an Amor asteroid – a subgroup of near-Earth asteroids that approach the orbit of Earth from beyond, but do not cross it. It orbits the Sun at a distance of 1.2–4.1 AU once every 4 years and 4 months (1,577 days). Its orbit has an eccentricity of 0.53 and an inclination of 11° with respect to the ecliptic. The body's observation arc begins at the discovering observatory, 10 days after its official discovery observation.

=== Close approaches ===
The asteroid has an Earth minimum orbit intersection distance of 0.2537 AU (38,000,000 km), which corresponds to 98.8 lunar distances. It approached Earth at a similar distance on 20 October 1963, shortly after its discovery. Because of its high orbital eccentricity, it also a Mars-crosser and passed within approximatelt 1.4 AU of Jupiter on 20 April 1970.

== Physical characteristics ==
Little is known about Baboquivari's physical characteristics. Its spectral type has never been determined.

=== Diameter and albedo ===
It is classified as a near-Earth object larger than one kilometer in diameter by the Minor Planet Center. A generic magnitude-to-diameter conversion gives a diameter of 1.9 kilometers, based on the body's absolute magnitude of 16.0 and an assumed standard albedo for stony S-type asteroids (Baboquivari would still measure 1.3 kilometers in diameter, if it had a higher albedo of 0.4, typically seen among bright members of the Hungaria family).

=== Rotation period ===
As of 2017, no rotational lightcurve of Baboquivari has been obtained from photometric observations. The asteroid's rotation period, poles and shape remain unknown.

== Naming ==
This minor planet was named after the main-peak of the Baboquivari Mountains, a sacred location in the mythology of the Papago Indian Tribe. The Observatories of the Association of Universities for Research in Astronomy (AURA) are located on the Baboquivari land, just a few kilometers south of Kitt Peak. The approved naming citation was published by the Minor Planet Center on 1 December 1979 (M.P.C. 5038).
