= Surveyor General of Arizona =

Office in the state government of Arizona

The Surveyor General of Arizona is served by the State Treasurer, Kimberly Yee. Some duties of the Surveyor-General are fulfilled by the Arizona State Land Commissioner
