= Sun cross =

Circle containing four or more spokes

Sun cross

A sun cross, solar cross, or wheel cross is a solar symbol consisting of an equilateral cross inside a circle. The design is frequently found in the symbolism of prehistoric cultures, particularly during the Neolithic to Bronze Age periods of European prehistory. The symbol's ubiquity and apparent importance in prehistoric religion have given rise to its interpretation as a solar symbol, whence the modern English term "sun cross" (a calque of German: Sonnenkreuz). The symbol is similar to the hieroglyph for village (Gardiner symbol O49) in Ancient Egyptian.

Prehistoric rock carvings at Madsebakke, on Bornholm Island, Denmark, depict multiple sun crosses with cup marks. These petroglyphs date to the Bronze Age (c. 1800–500 BCE) and are among the best-preserved in Scandinavia. The big wheel sun cross, carved directly into granite bedrock, is a circular motif with radial arms – often interpreted as a solar symbol representing the movement of the sun or the cycle of seasons. Around it are cup marks, small carved indentations believed to hold ritual significance, possibly linked to offerings or celestial events. Other locations with similar sun cross motifs and cup-marked stones include:

- Bohuslän, Sweden – home to thousands of Bronze Age carvings with solar boats, warriors, and sun wheels.
- Alta, Norway – UNESCO World Heritage site with symbolic carvings, including solar imagery.
- Götaland and Östergötland, Sweden – known for petroglyphs featuring sun crosses and animal figures.

These carvings are part of a shared Nordic symbolic tradition, emphasizing sun worship, cycles of life, and ancestral rituals. The same symbol is in use as a modern astronomical symbol representing the Earth rather than the sun. In pharmacy, the sun cross symbol represents various/miscellaneous drugs. After World War II, variants of the symbol became associated with neo-Nazi and white supremacist movements.

== Interpretation as solar symbol ==
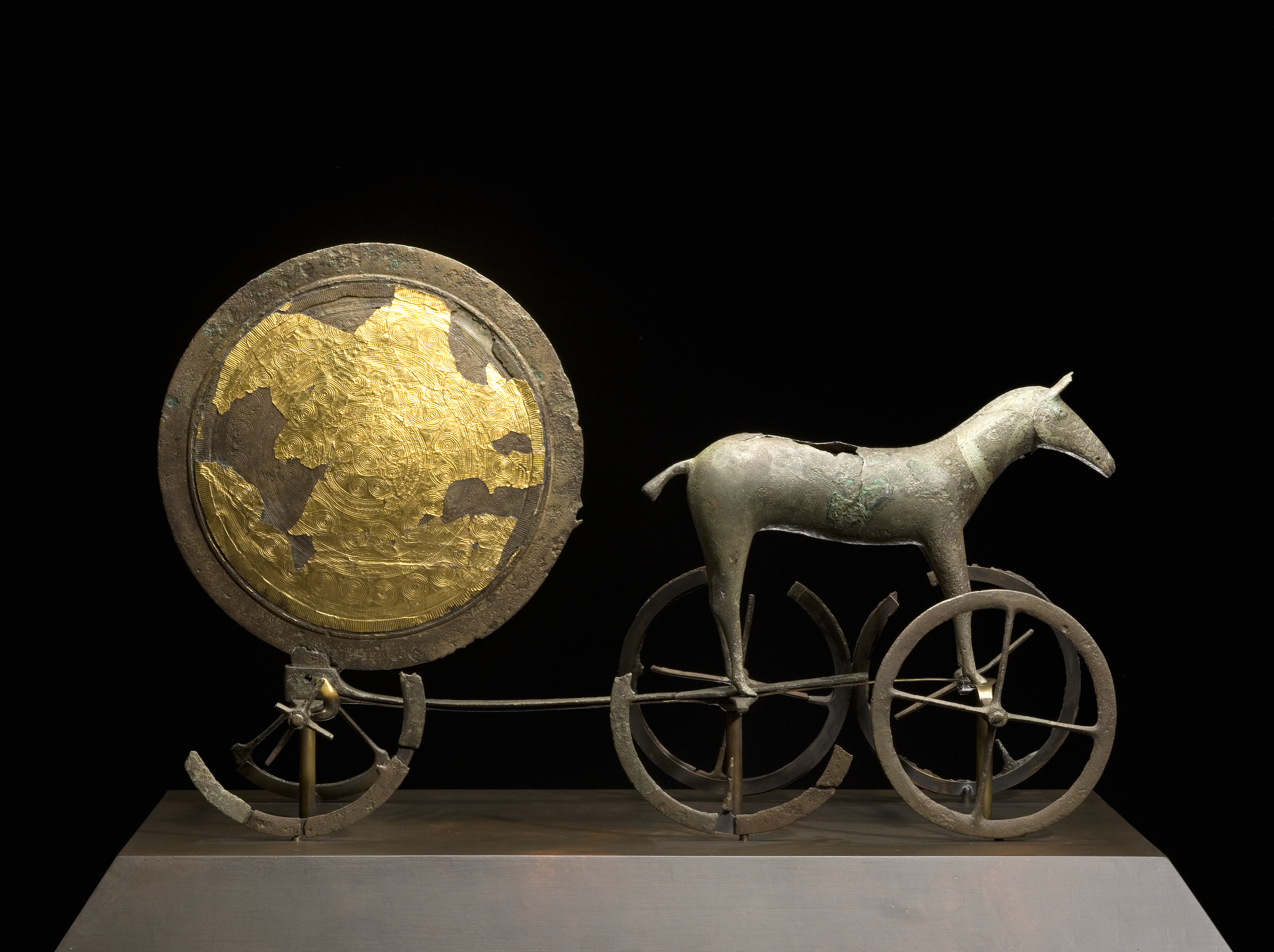
Chariot of the goddess of the sun Sól with solar cross-shaped wheels (Trundholm sun chariot, Bronze Age, Denmark)

The interpretation of the simple equilateral cross as a solar symbol in Bronze Age religion was widespread in 19th-century scholarship. The cross-in-a-circle was interpreted as a solar symbol derived from the interpretation of the disc of the sun as the wheel of the chariot of the sun god. Wieseler (1881) postulated an (unattested) Gothic rune hvel ("wheel") representing the solar deity by the "wheel" symbol of a cross-in-a-circle, reflected by the Gothic letter hwair (𐍈).

The English term "sun cross", on the other hand, is comparatively recent, apparently loaned from German Sonnenkreuz and used in the 1955 translation of Rudolf Koch's Book of Signs ("The Sun-Cross or Cross of Wotan", p. 94). The German term Sonnenkreuz was used in 19th-century scholarly literature of any cross symbol interpreted as a solar symbol, an equilateral cross either with or without a circle, or an oblique cross (saltire). Sonnenkreuz was used of the flag design of the Paneuropean Union in the 1920s. In the 1930s, a version of the symbol with broken arms (resembling a curved swastika, illustrated below) was popular as a link between Christianity and Germanic paganism in the völkisch German Faith Movement.

== Archaeological record ==
=== Bronze Age ===
In the prehistoric religion of Bronze Age Europe, crosses in circles appear frequently on artifacts identified as cult items, for example the "miniature standard" with an amber inlay that shows a cross shape when held against the light, dating to the Nordic Bronze Age, held at the National Museum of Denmark, Copenhagen. The Bronze Age symbol has also been connected with the four-spoked chariot wheel, which is attested in Bronze Age Scandinavia, Central Europe and Greece (compare the Linear B ideogram 243 "wheel" 𐃏). In the context of a culture that celebrated the sun chariot, it may thus have had a "solar" connotation (compare the Trundholm sun chariot).

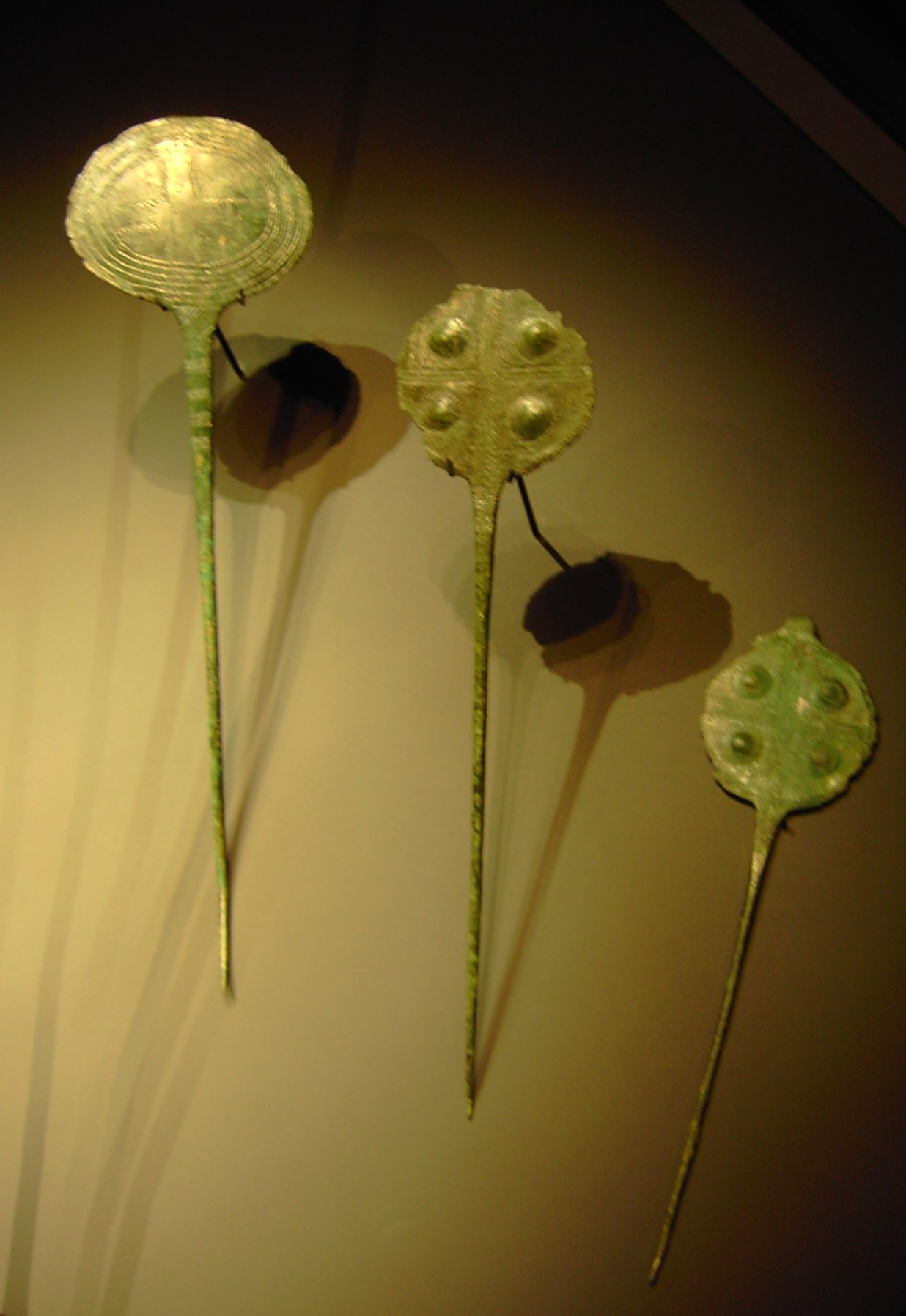
Ornamental pins, found in Switzerland, date to the first half of the 2nd millennium BC; their circular heads are incised with crosses

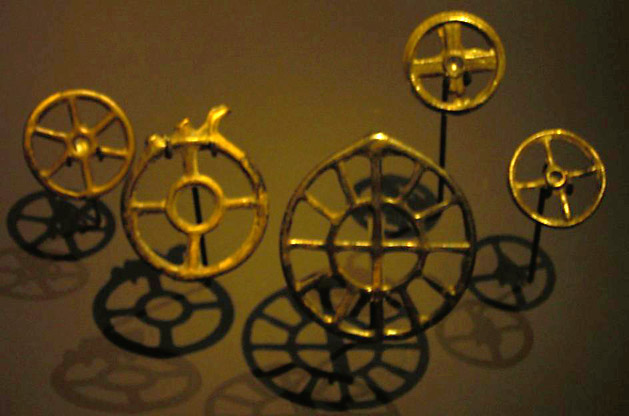
Wheel pendants dating to the second half of the 2nd millennium BC, found in Zürich. Variants include a six-spoked wheel, a central empty circle, and a second circle with twelve spokes surrounding one of four spokes.

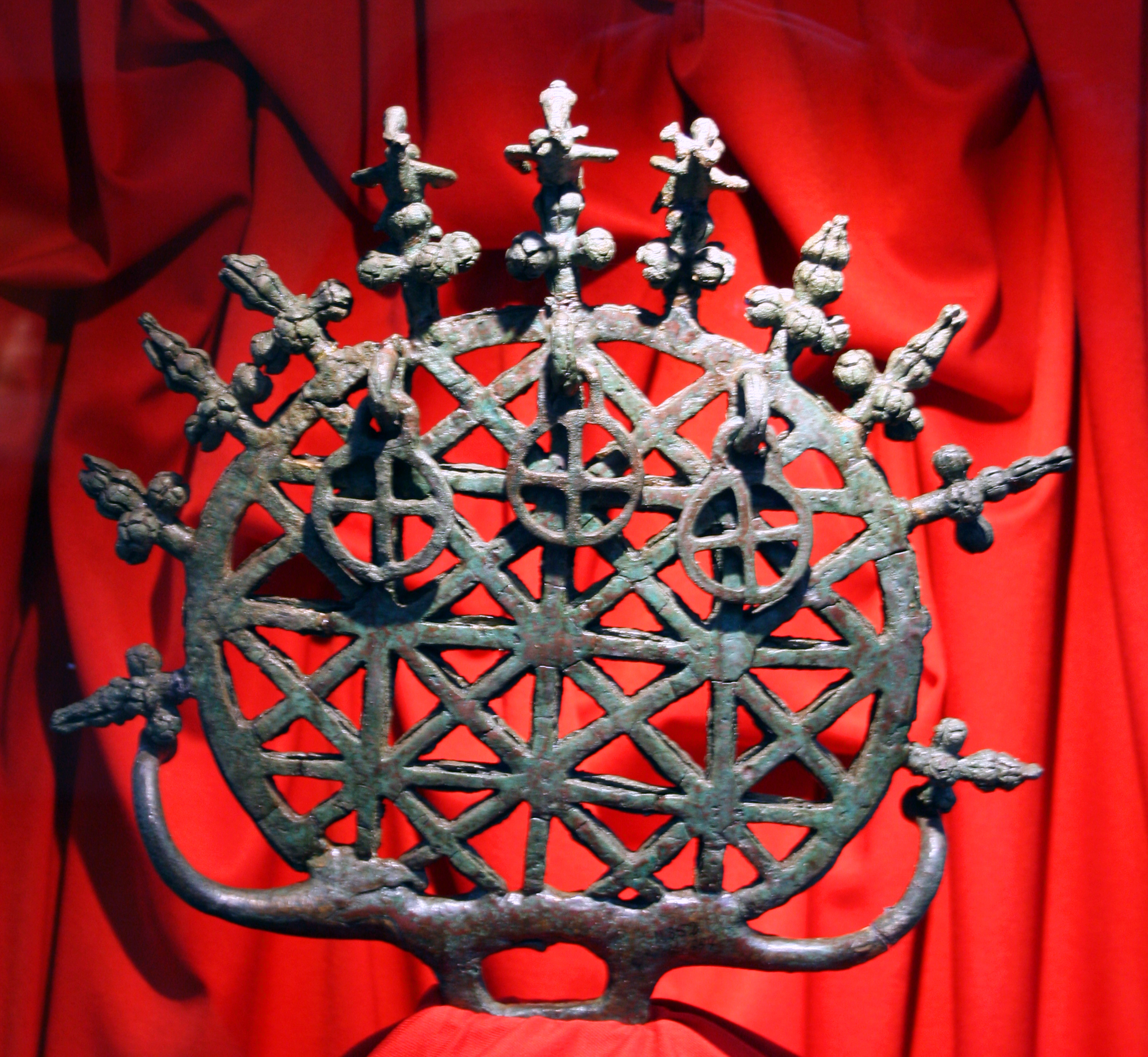
A sun disk found in tombs in Alacahöyük dates back to the early Bronze Age. Notice the three sun crosses on the sun disk.

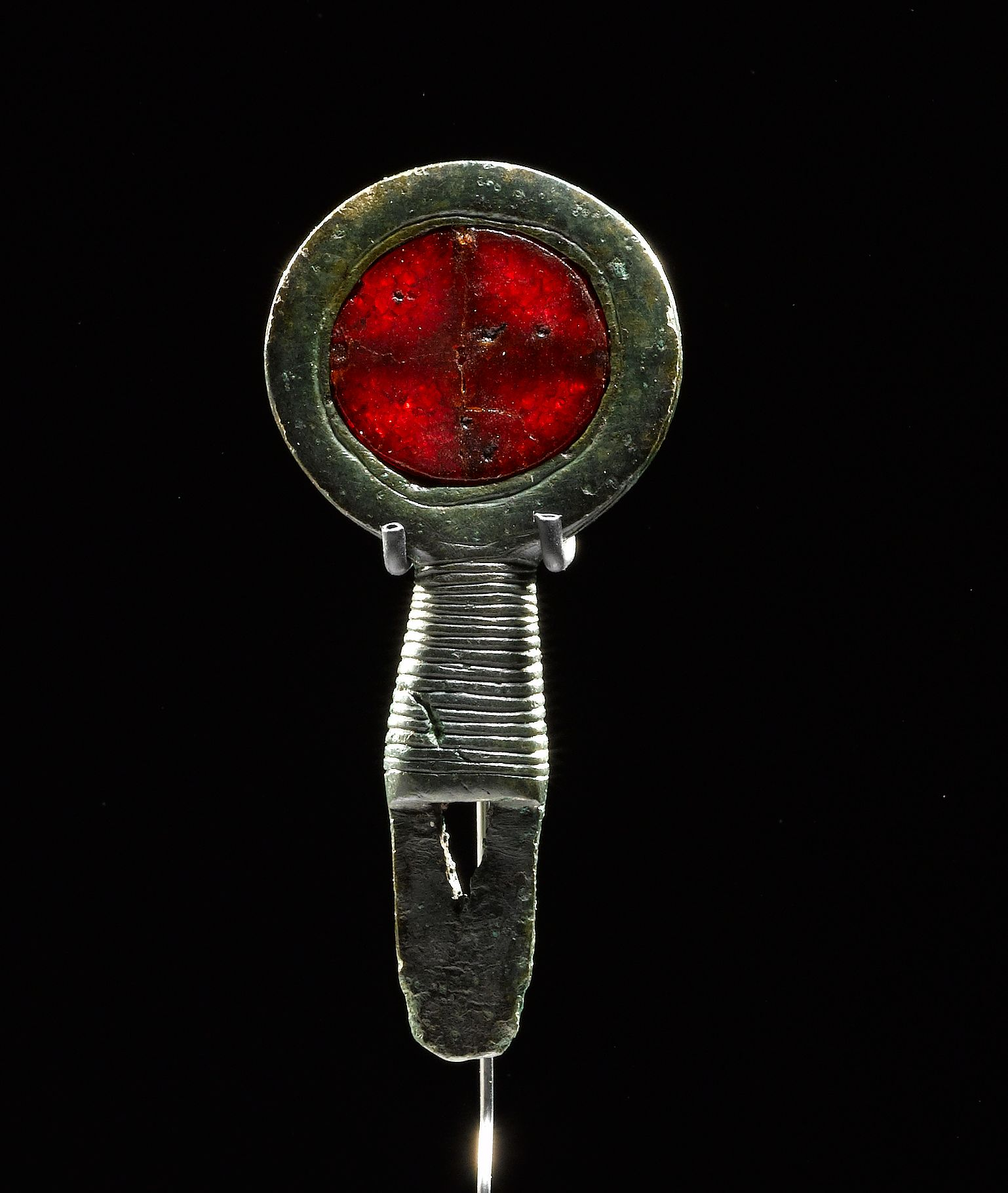
Amber sun cross, Nordic Bronze Age, Denmark.

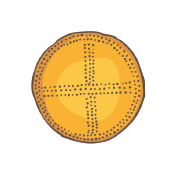
Corded Ware culture amber sun disc (illustration)

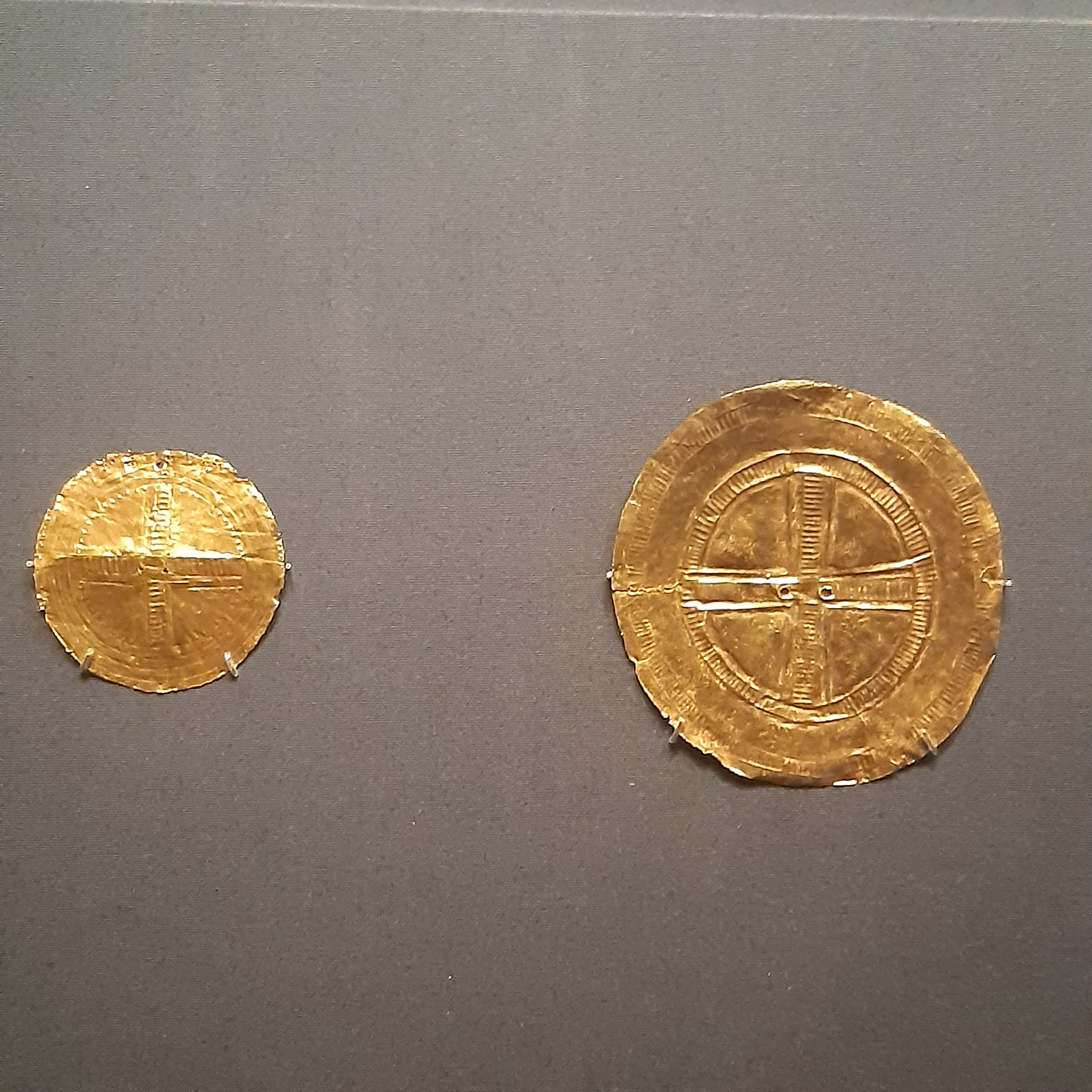
Gold discs from Ireland, c. 2400-2000 BC, Bell Beaker culture

== Modern culture ==
=== Astronomy ===
The same symbol represents the Earth in astronomical symbols, while the sun is represented by a circle with a center point.

=== Commerce ===
The Atchison, Topeka, and Santa Fe Railroad emblem was a cross in a circle with the words "Santa Fe" across the horizontal bar. In this case, the lines making up the cross were much wider than the circle.

=== Ethnography ===
The Sacred Hoop aka Medicine Wheel is a similar symbol in widespread use by Native Americans including Plains Indians and previously by Hopewell cultures. Other indigenous peoples also use or used the solar cross on their symbolism and as decoration practices.

=== Politics ===
The Sassanian Empire in Persia used a similar solar cross on their banner, called the Derafsh Kaviani symbol. The Norwegian fascist party Nasjonal Samling used a golden sun cross on a red background as an official symbol from 1933 to 1945. The cross with the circle was associated with Olaf II of Norway, patron saint of Norway, and the colors were the coat of arms of Norway. The Paneuropean Union, a European unification movement, uses this symbol as central element of its flag.

A square cross interlocking with or surrounded by a circle is one of the most popular symbols used by individuals and organisations to represent white nationalism, white supremacy, Neo-Nazism, and white pride. In its Celtic cross form, it is used as the logo for white nationalist website Stormfront. This stems from the use of a circled cross by Norwegian Nazis during World War II. In New Zealand, the Odin's cross was one of the symbols used by Brenton Tarrant in the Christchurch mosque shootings.

In Germany, a "stylized" circled cross was adopted by a prohibited political party (VSBD/PdA), leading to a ban of the symbol if used within a context of promoting racism (see Strafgesetzbuch section 86a). Although there were doubts on the constitutionality of the ban, it was upheld in a decision of the supreme court. In Italy, there is a similar ban based on Legge Mancino (the "Mancino Law", from the Minister of Interior who enacted the law).

=== Tools ===
A similar glyph is used in tool sets to denote Phillips-head screws and screwdrivers.

== Unicode ==
There is no formal code point in Unicode for this symbol, though other symbols representing the sun are included. Symbols designed for other purposes, such as U+1F728 🜨 ALCHEMICAL SYMBOL FOR VERDIGRIS, U+2295 ⊕ CIRCLED PLUS and U+2A01 ⨁ N-ARY CIRCLED PLUS OPERATOR, and U+2316 ⌖ POSITION INDICATOR are similar.

== Examples ==
Sun wheel

Earth astronomical symbol

Broken sun cross or "circle swastika" (cf. swastika)

Caddo sun cross

Ashur sun cross

Sun cross of Ashur and crescent moon of Nanna

Shimazu clan mon

Former flag of Daejeon, South Korea (1972–1995) contains small green sun cross in the centre

Emblem of Nasjonal Samling

Flag of Hirden

Emblem of the Atchison, Topeka, and Santa Fe Railway

The Celtic wheel cross is not a sun symbol though superficially similar

Emblem of Australian National Action, depicting a sun wheel over the Southern Cross

== See also ==
- Astrological symbols – Symbols denoting astrological concepts
- Black Sun (symbol) – Neo-Nazi and esoteric symbol
- Celtic cross – Christian cross superimposed on a circle
- Circled plus (disambiguation) (⊕)
- Coptic cross – Cross associated with Coptic Christians
- Cross – Geometrical figure
- Direct sum – Algebraic structure formed from a collection of algebraic structures
- Earth symbol – Astronomical symbols for the planet Earth, alchemical symbol for the element Earth
- Exclusive or – True when either but not both inputs are true
- Ringed cross – Cross enclosed in a ring or halo
- Solar symbol – Symbol representing the Sun
- Swastika – Ancient Eurasian icon and Nazi symbol
- Tursaansydän – Ancient symbol used in Northern Europe
- Western use of the swastika in the early 20th century – Use of ancient Eurasian religious symbol
