= Zierscheibe =

Type of metal artifact

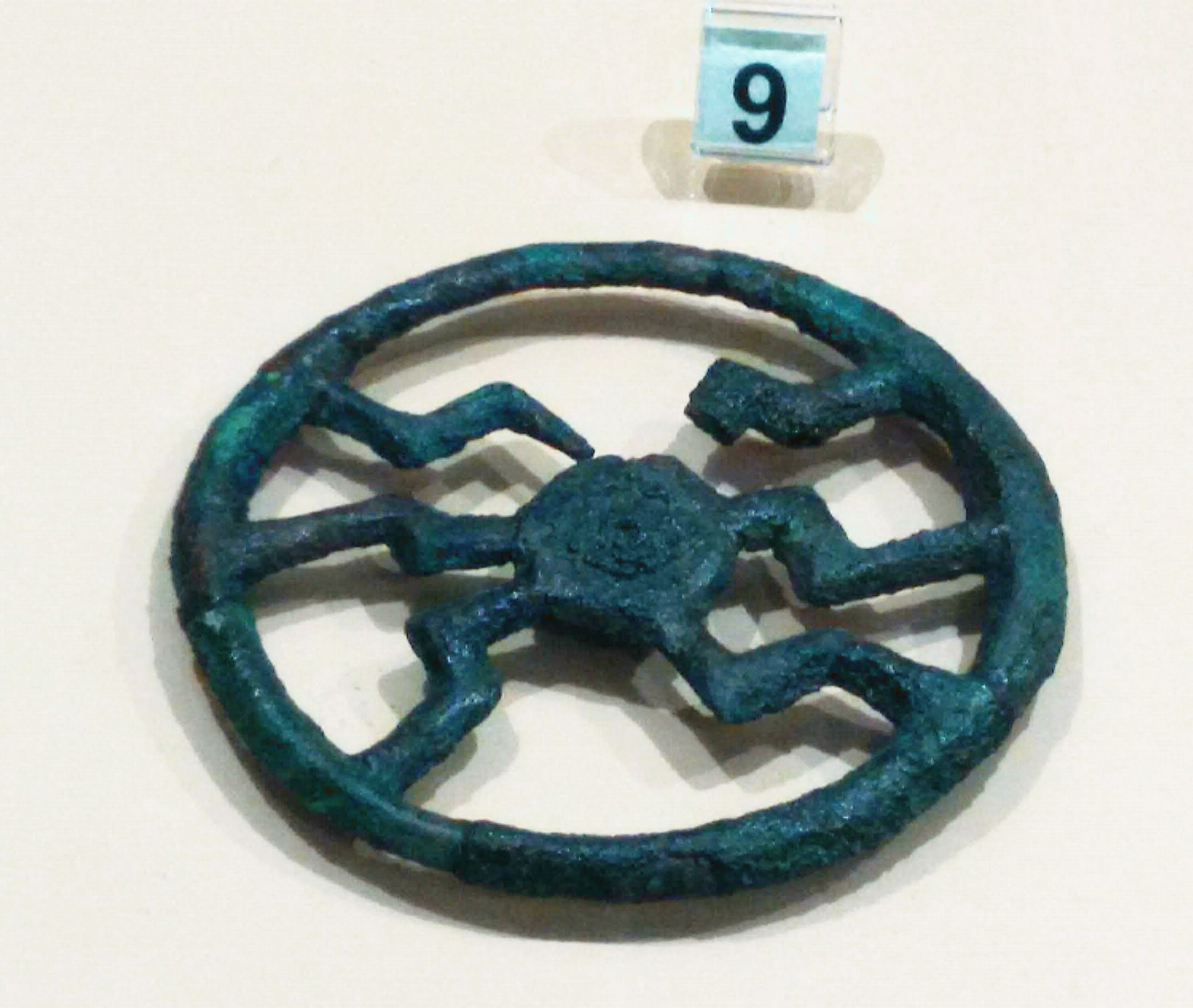
Zierscheibe, part of a woman's belt from the Villanovan necropolis of Verucchio, Italy, 800-700 BC.

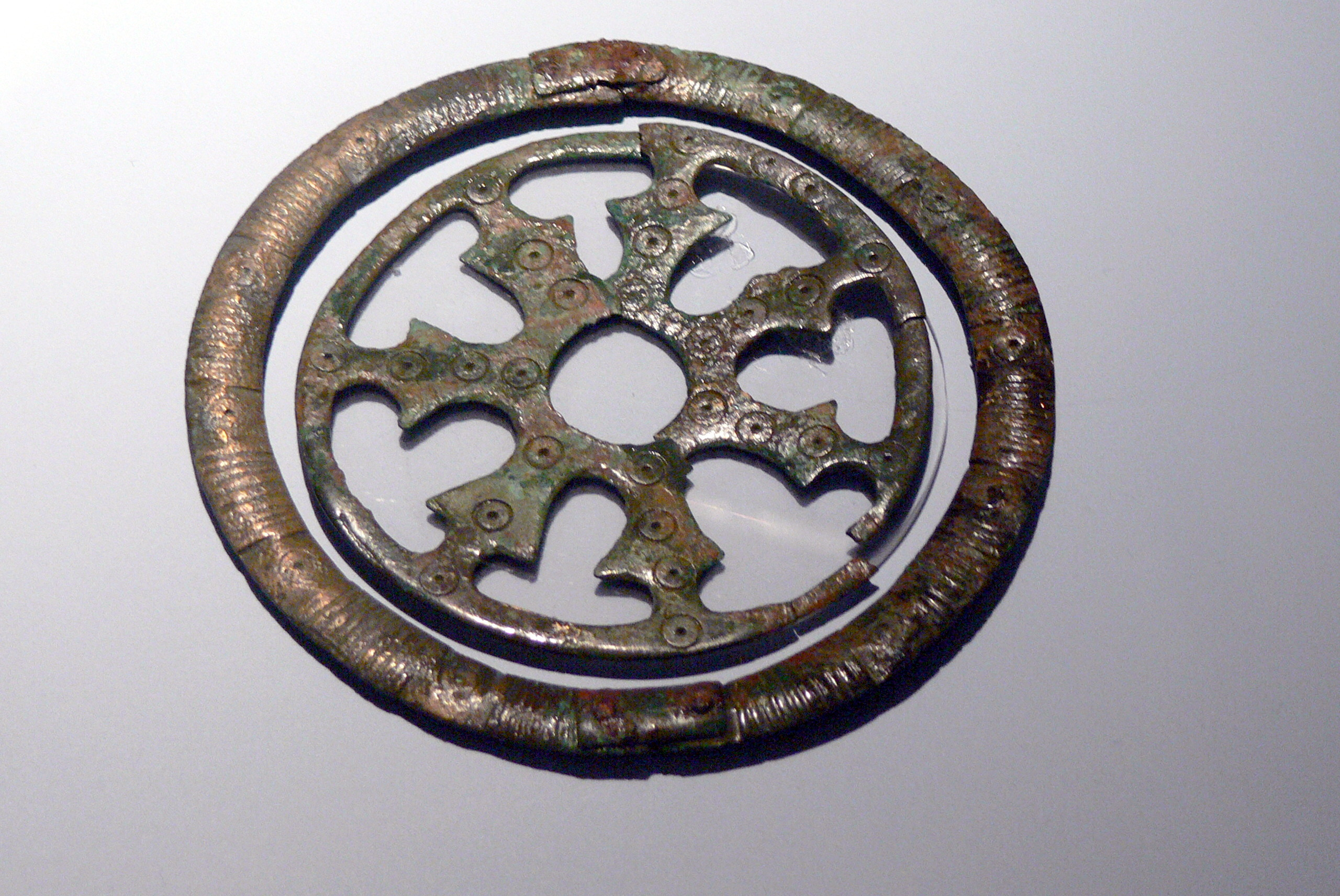
Alemannic Zierscheibe from Herbrechtingen (6th century). Similar jewellery has also been dated to the 7th century.

Zierscheibe (German for "ornamental disk") in archaeology is the term for a kind of metal jewellery dating from the European Bronze Age to the European Iron Age. These disks are sometimes found in graves, and are thought to have been worn as pendants attached to the tunica, or as part of a belt pouch.

Early examples date to the Late Bronze Age (ca. 800 BC). They develop into characteristic designs notably attested from Alamannic graves from the migration period.

Some scholars have suggested that these disks might have inspired the artist behind the Wewelsburg mosaic to create the Black Sun, a far-right Nazi symbol. Researcher Daniela Siepe says, however, that "such a connection has yet to be confirmed through reliable sources".

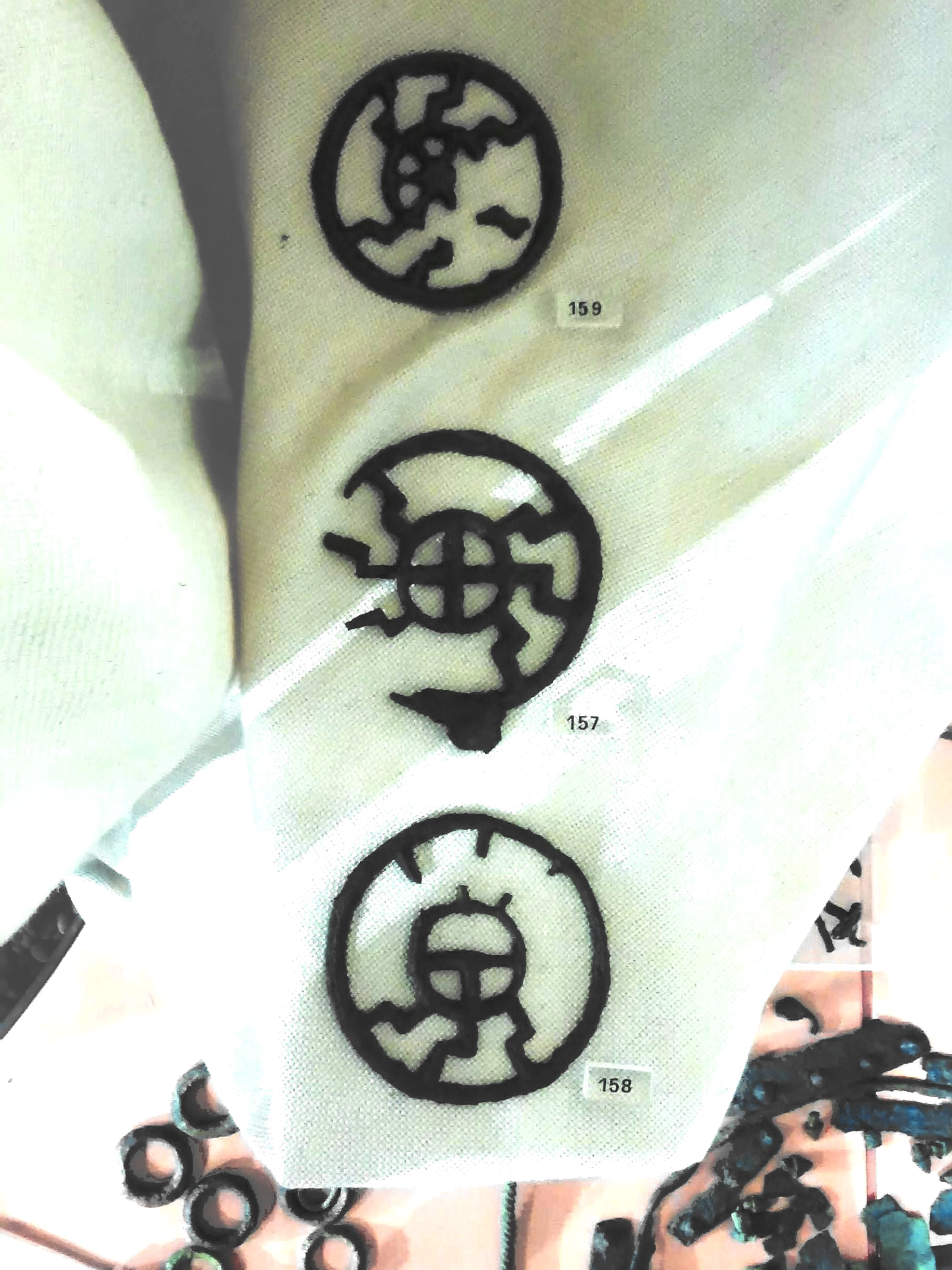
Decorative elements of a female belt in the 47 tomb, necropolis of Lippi, Verucchio. Product of the Villanovian culture, 700-600 BC.

== See also ==
- Black Sun (symbol) - Nazi symbol possibly based on a Zierscheibe design
- Bracteate
- Brooch
- Fibula (brooch)

== Sources ==
- Goodrick-Clarke, Nicholas (2002). Black Sun: Aryan Cults, Esoteric Nazism and the Politics of Identity. New York University Press. ISBN 0-8147-3124-4.
- Siepe, Daniela (2022). Myths of Wewelsburg Castle: Facts and Fiction. Brill Schöningh. pp. 143–162. ISBN 978-3-657-79200-9.
