= I'itoi =

Creator god of the O'odham peoples of Arizona

I'itoi, the Man in the Maze

I'itoi or I'ithi is, in the cosmology of the O'odham peoples of Arizona, a spirit who resides in a cave below the peak of Baboquivari Mountain, a sacred place within the territory of the Tohono O'odham Nation. O'odham oral history describes I'itoi bringing Hohokam people to this earth from the underworld. Hohokam are ancestors of both the Tohono O'odham (Desert People) and the Akimel O'odham (River People). He is also responsible for the gift of the Himdag, a series of commandments guiding people to remain in balance with the world and interact with it as intended.

Visitors to the cave are asked to bring a gift to ensure their safe return from the depths.

== Name ==
The Pima also refer to I'itoi as Se:he "Elder Brother", also See-a-huh. The term I'ithi is a dialectal variant used by the Hia C-eḍ O'odham.

He is most often depicted as the Man in the Maze, a design appearing on O'odham basketry and petroglyphs. This positions him at the entry to a labyrinth. This labyrinth is believed by the Akimel O'odham and Tohono O'odham to be the maze of life, where a person travels through life and encounters the different moments that impact them.

== Modern appearance ==
The Man in the Maze motif appears frequently in contemporary crafts and art of the Southwest of the United States, most prominently by Tohono O'odham silversmiths rings and other jewelry and Akimel O'odham artisans in baskets. Among these groups, the pattern has been very popular since the 1900s. Every basket pattern has a "mistake", called a dau ("door"), which is intentionally integrated into its design so that the spirit of the basket can be released.

A similar symbol appears as a key plot point in the HBO television series Westworld, accompanied by a legend described as an "old native myth," in which the image of the maze is explained in part as representing, "the sum of a man's life. The choices he makes, the dreams he hangs onto."

It is also referenced in the fourth season of the TV series Fringe, on a bracelet belonging to Agent Lee's partner, Robert Danzig. Lee gives it to Agent Dunham as a thankyou for saving his (Lee's) life. In a later episode, forgetting what it means, she returns it to Lee, who reminds her that the image "...is Native American. The maze represents the journey of life, the obstacles, making the right choices, until we find ourselves in the centre....home, a place to belong...(Danzig) gave me this as a reminder that I'd always have a home with him and his family"

== Legend ==
Tohono O'odham storytellers shared the following story in the late 1930s with Ruth Murray Underhill, which she recorded in her book, Singing For Power:

The world was made by Earth-maker out of the dirt and sweat which he scraped from his skin... the flat earth met the sky with a crash like that of falling rocks, and from the two was born Iitoi, the protector of Papagos. He had light hair and a beard. [] Iitoi and Earth-maker shaped and peopled the new world, and they were followed everywhere by Coyote, who came to life uncreated and began immediately to poke his nose into everything. In this new world there was a flood, and the three agreed before they took refuge that the one of them who should emerge first after the subsidence of the waters should be their leader and have the title of Elder Brother. It was Earth-maker, the creator, who came forth first, and Iitoi next, but Iitoi insisted on the title and took it. [] Iitoi "brought the people up like children" and taught them their arts, but in the end he became unkind and they killed him.... But Iitoi, though killed, had so much power that he came to life again. Then he invented war. He decided to sweep the earth of the people he had made. [] He needed an army and for this purpose he went underground and brought up the Papagos. [] They live in a land scattered with imposing ruins which belonged... to the Hohokum, "the people who are gone". [] Iitoi drove them, some to the north and some to the south... "Iitoi had a song for everything". Though his men did the fighting, Iitoi confirmed their efforts by singing the enemy into blindness and helplessness. [] Iitoi has retired from the world and lives, a little old man, in a mountain cave. Or, perhaps he has gone underground.

== Oral history ==
According to O'odham oral history, the labyrinth design depicts experiences and choices individuals make in the journey through life. In the middle of the "maze", a person finds their dreams and goals. When one reaches the center, the individual has a final opportunity (the last turn in the design) to look back upon choices made and the path taken, before the Sun God greets us, blesses us and passes us into the next world.

As told by Alfretta Antone:

Elder Brother lived in the maze ... and the reason why he lived in the maze was because ... I think how I'm gonna say this ... magician or oh, medicine man that can disappear, and that can do things, heal people and things like that ... that was Elder Brother ... Se:he ... they called him ... he lived in there ... but he had a lot of enemies so he made that, and to live in there people would go in there but they couldn't find him ... they would turn around and go back.

But in real life ... when you look at the maze you start from the top and go into the maze ... your life, you go down and then you reach a place where you have to turn around ... maybe in your own life you fall, something happens in your home, you are sad, you pick yourself up and you go on through the maze ... you go on and on and on ... so many places in there you might ... maybe your child died ... or maybe somebody died, or you stop, you fall and you feel bad ... you get up, turn around and go again ... when you reach that middle of the maze ... that's when you see the Sun God and the Sun God blesses you and say you have made it ... that's where you die.

The maze is a symbol of life ... happiness, sadness ... and you reach your goal ... there's a dream there, and you reach that dream when you get to the middle of the maze ... that's how I was told, my grandparents told me that's how the maze is.
