= Stephan Mögle-Stadel =

German journalist

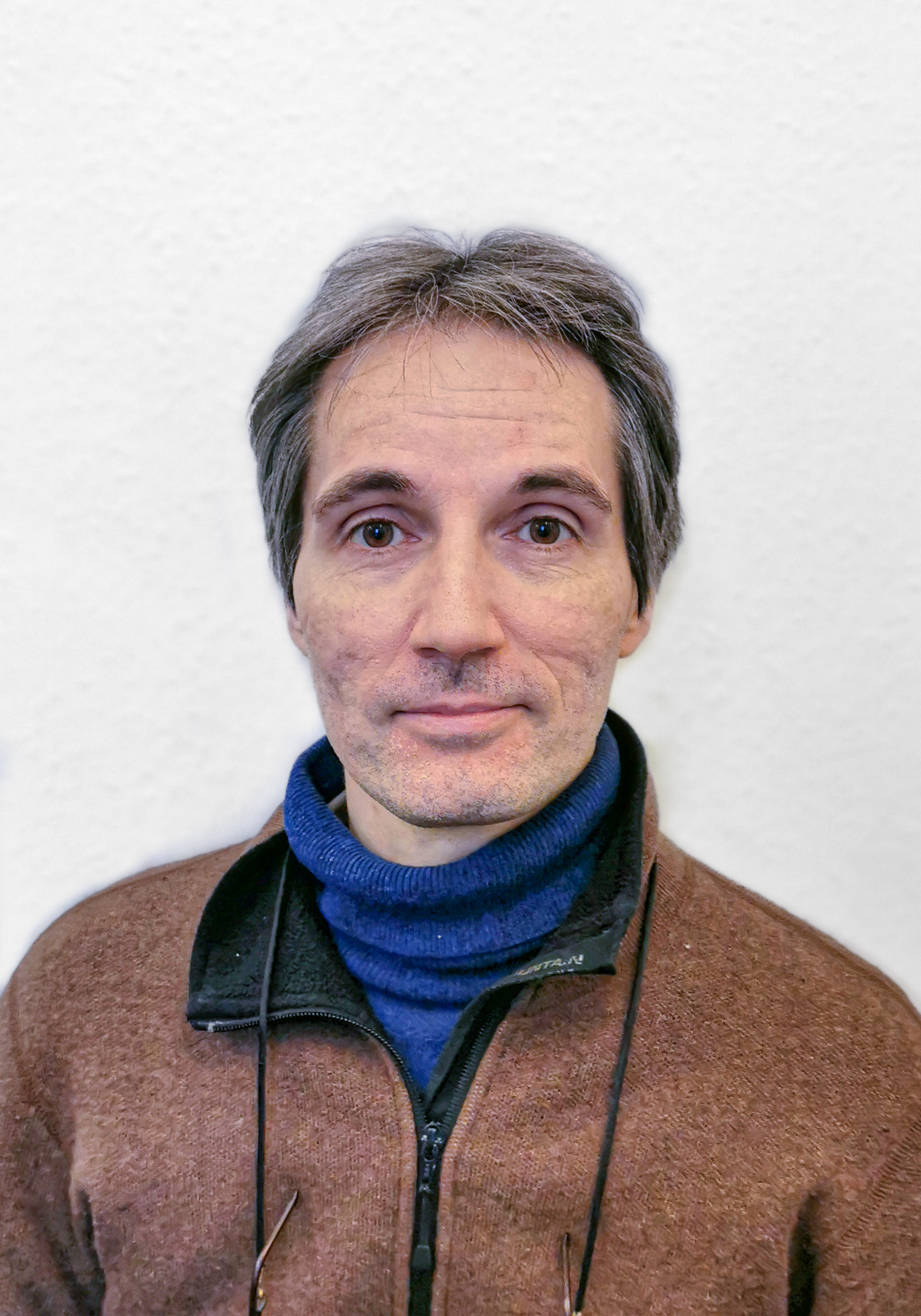
Stephan Mögle-Stadel, 2019

Stephan Mögle-Stadel (born 21 December 1965) is a German educator, journalist and author.

Together with Troy Davis, he is the chairman of a world citizenship group, of which he is the Founder and President and the author of the 'Dag Hammarskjöld: Vision einer Menschheitsethik' (Vision from a Human Ethic).

== Background ==
He studied education, psychology, and history, partly at the C. G. Jung Institute for Depth Psychology, and he is a member of the Erich Fromm Society for Social Psychology. He trained as a journalist in the Axel Springer company and at the Akademie für Publizistik in Hamburg. After this he wrote as an independent journalist for different newspapers. In 1990 he became a correspondent at the United Nations in New York City. In 1992, while he did his alternative national service as a conscientious objector, he took part in a UN internship programme. In 1998 he took part as a journalist and NGO representative at the Berlin Conference for World Climate Change and in 1993 at the Preparation Conference for the World Summit in Rio. As a travel journalist he reported from Egypt, Israel, India, Japan and the USA. After that he worked within the range of human rights and globalization questions for non-governmental organizations and since 1998 he has been an honorary member of the board of the World Citizen Foundation New York.

He has written and published several books on globalization, human rights, united nations, governance, futurology, and psychohistory. His first book, the occult-Nazi thriller Die Schwarze Sonne von Tashi Lhunpo, was published in 1991 under the pen-name Russell McCloud. He was also the editor of Boutros Boutros-Ghali's book UNorganisierte Welt.

== Publications ==
- Boutros-Ghali, Boutros (1993). Mögle-Stadel, Stephan (ed.). UNorganisierte Welt: die Reform der Vereinten Nationen [UNorganised world: reform of the United Nations]. Stuttgart: Horizonte. ISBN 3-89483-004-2.
- Annan, Kofi A.; Mögle-Stadel, Stephan (2003). UNvollendeter Weg: die UNO im 21. Jahrhundert [UNcompleted way: the UNO in the 21st century]. Hamburg: Deutsche Unitarier. ISBN 3-922483-08-9.
- Mögle-Stadel, Stephan (2003). Menschheit an der Schwelle: Globalisierungskrise und Weltwirtschaftsdiktatur [Humanity on the threshold: crisis of globalization and world economic dictatorship]. Stuttgart: Urachhaus. ISBN 3-8251-7398-4.
- Mögle-Stadel, Stephan (1999). Dag Hammarskjöld – Vision einer Menschheitsethik [Dag Hammarskjöld: vision of an ethics of humanity]. Stuttgart: Urachhaus. ISBN 3-8251-7268-6.
- Mögle-Stadel, Stephan (1996). Die Unteilbarkeit der Erde: Globale Krise, Weltbürgertum und Weltförderation; eine Antwort an den Club of Rome [The indivisibility of the earth: global crisis, world citizenship and world federation; a response to the Club of Rome]. Bonn: Bouvier. ISBN 3-416-02565-2.
- Flechtheim, Ossip K.; Mögle-Stadel, Stephan (1995). Ist die Zukunft noch zu retten? [Can the future still be saved?]. Frankfurt am Main; Bern: Peter Lang. ISBN 3-631-47865-8.
- Mögle-Stadel, Stephan (2005). Dag Hammarskjölds Vermächtnis – Ich und Du, Mensch und Menschheit [Dag Hammarskjöld's legacy: you and I, human and humanity]. Heidenheim: Amthor. ISBN 3-934104-17-7.
