= List of Cordia species =

Cordia is a genus in the borage family (Boraginaceae).

As of May 2020, Plants of the World Online accepted the following species:

- Cordia aberrans I.M.Johnst.
- Cordia acutifolia Fresen.
- Cordia affinis Fresen.
- Cordia africana Lam.
- Cordia allartii Killip
- Cordia alliodora (Ruiz & Pav.) Oken
- Cordia americana (L.) Gottschling & J.S.Mill.
- Cordia anabaptista Cham.
- Cordia anisophylla J.S.Mill.
- Cordia aristeguietae G.Agostini
- Cordia aspera G.Forst.
- Cordia aurantiaca Baker
- Cordia balanocarpa Brenan
- Cordia bantamensis Blume
- Cordia bequaertii De Wild.
- Cordia bicolor A.DC.
- Cordia blanchetii A.DC.
- Cordia blancoi S.Vidal
- Cordia bogotensis Benth.
- Cordia boissieri A.DC.
- Cordia bordasii Schinini
- Cordia borinquensis Urb.
- Cordia brachytricha Fresen.
- Cordia brasiliensis (I.M.Johnst.) Gottschling & J.S.Mill.
- Cordia brunnea Kurz
- Cordia buxifolia Juss. ex Poir.
- Cordia cabanayensis Gaviria
- Cordia caffra Sond.
- Cordia calocoma Miq.
- Cordia cardenasiana J.S.Mill.
- Cordia chaetodonta Melch.
- Cordia chamissoniana G.Don
- Cordia cicatricosa L.O.Williams
- Cordia clarkei Brace ex Prain
- Cordia cochinchinensis Gagnep.
- Cordia colimensis I.M.Johnst.
- Cordia collococca L.
- Cordia colombiana Killip
- Cordia copulata Poir.
- Cordia cordiformis I.M.Johnst.
- Cordia correae J.S.Mill.
- Cordia crassifolia Killip
- Cordia crenata Delile
- Cordia crispiflora A.DC.
- Cordia croatii J.S.Mill.
- Cordia curbeloi Alain
- Cordia cymosa (Donn.Sm.) Standl.
- Cordia decandra Hook. & Arn.
- Cordia decipiens I.M.Johnst.
- Cordia dentata Poir.
- Cordia dewevrei De Wild. & T.Durand
- Cordia dichotoma G.Forst.
- Cordia diffusa K.C.Jacob
- Cordia dillenii Spreng.
- Cordia diversifolia Pav. ex A.DC.
- Cordia dodecandra A.DC.
- Cordia dodecandria Sessé & Moc.
- Cordia domestica Roth
- Cordia domingensis Lam.
- Cordia dubiosa Blume
- Cordia dumosa Alain
- Cordia dwyeri Nowicke
- Cordia ecalyculata Vell.
- Cordia elaeagnoides A.DC.
- Cordia ellenbeckii Gürke ex Vaupel
- Cordia elliptica Sw.
- Cordia ensifolia Urb.
- Cordia eriostigma Pittier
- Cordia exaltata Lam.
- Cordia fallax I.M.Johnst.
- Cordia fanchoniae Feuillet
- Cordia faulknerae Verdc.
- Cordia fischeri Gürke
- Cordia fissistyla Vollesen
- Cordia fitchii Urb.
- Cordia fragrantissima Kurz
- Cordia fuertesii Estrada
- Cordia fulva I.M.Johnst.
- Cordia furcans I.M.Johnst.
- Cordia fusca M.Stapf
- Cordia galeottiana A.Rich.
- Cordia gardneri I.M.Johnst.
- Cordia gentryi J.S.Mill.
- Cordia gerascanthus L.
- Cordia gilletii De Wild.
- Cordia glabrata (Mart.) A.DC.
- Cordia glabrifolia M.Stapf
- Cordia glazioviana (Taub.) Gottschling & J.S.Mill.
- Cordia globifera W.W.Sm.
- Cordia globulifera I.M.Johnst.
- Cordia goeldiana Huber
- Cordia goetzei Gürke
- Cordia gracilipes I.M.Johnst.
- Cordia grandicalyx Oberm.
- Cordia grandis Roxb.
- Cordia greggii Torr.
- Cordia guacharaca Gaviria
- Cordia guerkeana Loes.
- Cordia guineensis Thonn.
- Cordia harrisii Urb.
- Cordia hartwissiana Regel
- Cordia hatschbachii J.S.Mill.
- Cordia heccaidecandra Loes.
- Cordia ignea Urb. & Ekman
- Cordia iguaguana Melch. ex I.M.Johnst.
- Cordia igualensis Bartlett
- Cordia incognita Gottschling & J.S.Mill.
- Cordia insignis Cham.
- Cordia intermedia Fresen.
- Cordia killipiana J.S.Mill.
- Cordia kingstoniana J.S.Mill.
- Cordia koemariae J.S.Mill.
- Cordia laevifrons I.M.Johnst.
- Cordia laevigata Lam.
- Cordia laevior I.M.Johnst.
- Cordia lasiocalyx Pittier
- Cordia lasseri G.Agostini ex Gaviria
- Cordia latiloba I.M.Johnst.
- Cordia leonis (Britton & P.Wilson) Ekman
- Cordia leslieae J.S.Mill.
- Cordia leucocoma Miq.
- Cordia leucosebestena Griseb.
- Cordia liesneri J.S.Mill.
- Cordia lomatoloba I.M.Johnst.
- Cordia longiflora Colla
- Cordia longipetiolata Warfa
- Cordia lowryana J.S.Mill.
- Cordia lucidula I.M.Johnst.
- Cordia lutea Lam.
- Cordia macleodii (Griff.) Hook.f. & Thomson
- Cordia macrantha Chodat
- Cordia macrophylla L.
- Cordia macvaughii J.S.Mill.
- Cordia magnoliifolia Cham.
- Cordia mairei Humbert
- Cordia mandimbana E.S.Martins
- Cordia marioniae Feuillet
- Cordia megalantha S.F.Blake
- Cordia megiae J.E.Burrows
- Cordia membranacea A.DC.
- Cordia meridensis Gaviria
- Cordia mexiana I.M.Johnst.
- Cordia mhaya Kerr
- Cordia micayensis Killip
- Cordia micronesica Kaneh. & Hatus.
- Cordia microsebestena Loes.
- Cordia millenii Baker
- Cordia moluccana Roxb.
- Cordia molundensis Mildbr.
- Cordia monoica Roxb.
- Cordia morelosana Standl.
- Cordia mukuensis Taton
- Cordia myxa L.
- Cordia naidophila I.M.Johnst.
- Cordia nervosa Lam.
- Cordia nodosa Lam.
- Cordia oblongifolia Thwaites
- Cordia obovata Balf.f.
- Cordia obtusa Balf.f.
- Cordia ochnacea A.DC.
- Cordia octandra A.DC.
- Cordia oliveri (Britton ex Rusby) Gottschling & J.S.Mill.
- Cordia oncocalyx Allemão
- Cordia panamensis L.Riley
- Cordia panicularis Rudge
- Cordia parvifolia A.DC.
- Cordia perbella Mildbr.
- Cordia perrottetii A.DC.
- Cordia peteri Verdc.
- Cordia pilosa M.Stapf & Taroda
- Cordia pilosissima Baker
- Cordia platythyrsa Baker
- Cordia porcata Nowicke
- Cordia propinqua Merr.
- Cordia protracta I.M.Johnst.
- Cordia prunifolia I.M.Johnst.
- Cordia pulverulenta (Urb.) Alain
- Cordia quercifolia Klotzsch
- Cordia ramanujamii N.Balach. & Rajendiran
- Cordia ramirezii Estrada
- Cordia restingae M.Stapf
- Cordia rickseckeri Millsp.
- Cordia ripicola I.M.Johnst.
- Cordia rogersii Hutch.
- Cordia rufescens A.DC.
- Cordia saccellia Gottschling & J.S.Mill.
- Cordia sagotii I.M.Johnst.
- Cordia salvadorensis Standl.
- Cordia santacruzensis J.S.Mill. & M.Nee
- Cordia scabra Desf.
- Cordia scabrifolia A.DC.
- Cordia schatziana J.S.Mill.
- Cordia schottiana Fresen.
- Cordia sebestena L.
- Cordia seleriana Fernald
- Cordia sellowiana Cham.
- Cordia senegalensis Juss. ex Poir.
- Cordia sericicalyx A.DC.
- Cordia serratifolia Kunth
- Cordia silvestris Fresen.
- Cordia sinensis Lam.
- Cordia sipapoi Gaviria
- Cordia skutchii I.M.Johnst.
- Cordia somaliensis Baker
- Cordia sonorae Rose
- Cordia splendida Diels
- Cordia sprucei Mez
- Cordia stellifera I.M.Johnst.
- Cordia stenoclada I.M.Johnst.
- Cordia stenoloba Gürke
- Cordia stuhlmannii Gürke
- Cordia subcordata Lam.
- Cordia subdentata Miq.
- Cordia suckertii Chiov.
- Cordia sulcata A.DC.
- Cordia superba Cham.
- Cordia tacarcunensis J.S.Mill.
- Cordia taguahyensis Vell.
- Cordia tarodae M.Stapf
- Cordia tetrandra Aubl.
- Cordia thaisiana G.Agostini
- Cordia tinifolia Willd. ex Roem. & Schult.
- Cordia toqueve Aubl.
- Cordia torrei E.S.Martins
- Cordia tortuensis Urb. & Ekman
- Cordia trachyphylla Mart.
- Cordia triangularis Urb.
- Cordia trichoclada A.DC.
- Cordia trichocladophylla Verdc.
- Cordia trichostemon A.DC.
- Cordia trichotoma (Vell.) Arráb. ex Steud.
- Cordia troyana Urb.
- Cordia truncatifolia Bartlett
- Cordia ucayaliensis (I.M.Johnst.) I.M.Johnst.
- Cordia ulei I.M.Johnst.
- Cordia umbellifera Killip ex G.Agostini
- Cordia uncinulata De Wild.
- Cordia valenzuelana A.Rich.
- Cordia vanhermannii Alain
- Cordia vargasii I.M.Johnst.
- Cordia varroniifolia I.M.Johnst.
- Cordia venosa Hemsl.
- Cordia vestita (A.DC.) Hook.f. & Thomson
- Cordia vignei Hutch. & Dalziel
- Cordia watsonii N.E.Rose
- Cordia weddellii I.M.Johnst.
- Cordia williamsii G.Agostini ex Gaviria
- Cordia yombomba Vaupel

Some species have been transferred to or retained in the genus Varronia, including:

- Cordia curassavica (Jacq.) Roem. & Schult. = Varronia curassavica Jacq.
- Cordia leucophlyctis Hook.f. = Varronia leucophlyctis (Hook.f.)
- Cordia polycephala (Lam.) I.M.Johnst. = Varronia polycephala Lam.
- Cordia rupicol Urb. = Varronia rupicola (Urb.) Britton
