= Diasebesten =

In pre-modern medicine, diasebesten (from Greek dia "[made] with" + modern Latin sebesten, Arab. sabastān, from Persian sepestān, possibly from Persian sag-pestān سگ‌پستان, literally "dog's teats"), is a soft, purgative electuary, containing sebesten, the plum-like fruit of the tree Cordia myxa, as one of its ingredients.

The other ingredients are prunes, tamarinds, juices of iris, anguria, and mercurialis, penide, simple diaprunum (made of damask prunes), violet seed, the four cold seeds (melon, gourd, purslane, and quince), and diagrydium. It was said to be good in intermittent and continued fevers, appease thirst, promote sleep, and expel morbid humours through urine.
