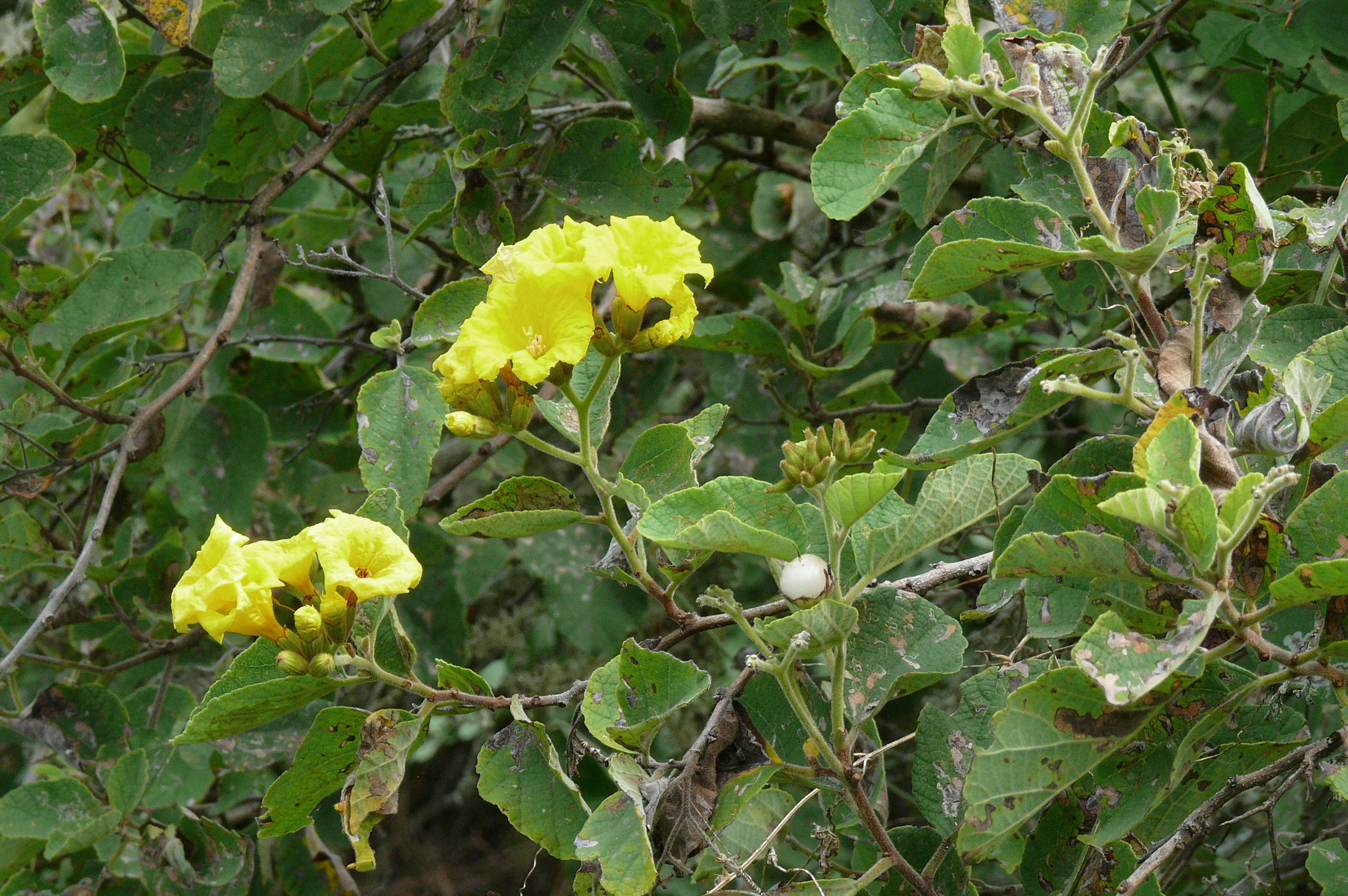
- Growing in Santa Cruz, Galápagos

Conservation status
- Least Concern (IUCN 3.1)

Scientific classification
- Kingdom: Plantae
- Clade: Tracheophytes
- Clade: Angiosperms
- Clade: Eudicots
- Clade: Asterids
- Order: Boraginales
- Family: Cordiaceae
- Genus: Cordia
- Species: C. lutea

Binomial name
- Cordia lutea Lam.

Synonyms
- Cordia flava (Andersson) Gürke; Cordia marchionica Drake; Lithocardium flavum (Andersson) Kuntze; Varronia flava Andersson

= Cordia lutea =

Species of plant

Cordia lutea, known as yellow cordia or in Spanish muyuyo, is a shrubby plant in the family Cordiaceae, native to the Galápagos Islands, mainland Ecuador, Peru, and the Marquesas Islands in Polynesia. Common in the arid lowlands of the Galápagos, its relatively large yellow flowers make it easy to identify.

== Description ==
Cordia lutea grows as a shrub or a small tree, up to 8 m (26 ft) tall. The young branches are hairy. The undivided leaves are arranged alternately, and are 4–10 cm (1.6–3.9 in) long, ovate to round in shape, with very finely toothed margins. The upper side of the leaf is rough in texture but hairless; the lower side bears hairs.

The yellow flowers are arranged in cymes and are sweetly scented. The petals of each flower are fused together to form a trumpet shape, 2–4 cm (0.8–1.6 in) across at the mouth, which has five to eight lobes. Inside the flower there are five to eight stamens. After fertilization, a globular white fruit (a drupe) forms, 8–12 millimetres (0.3–0.5 in) across, containing from one to four seeds. The fruit has a fleshy pulp that is initially slimy when the fruit is opened, but becomes sticky on exposure.

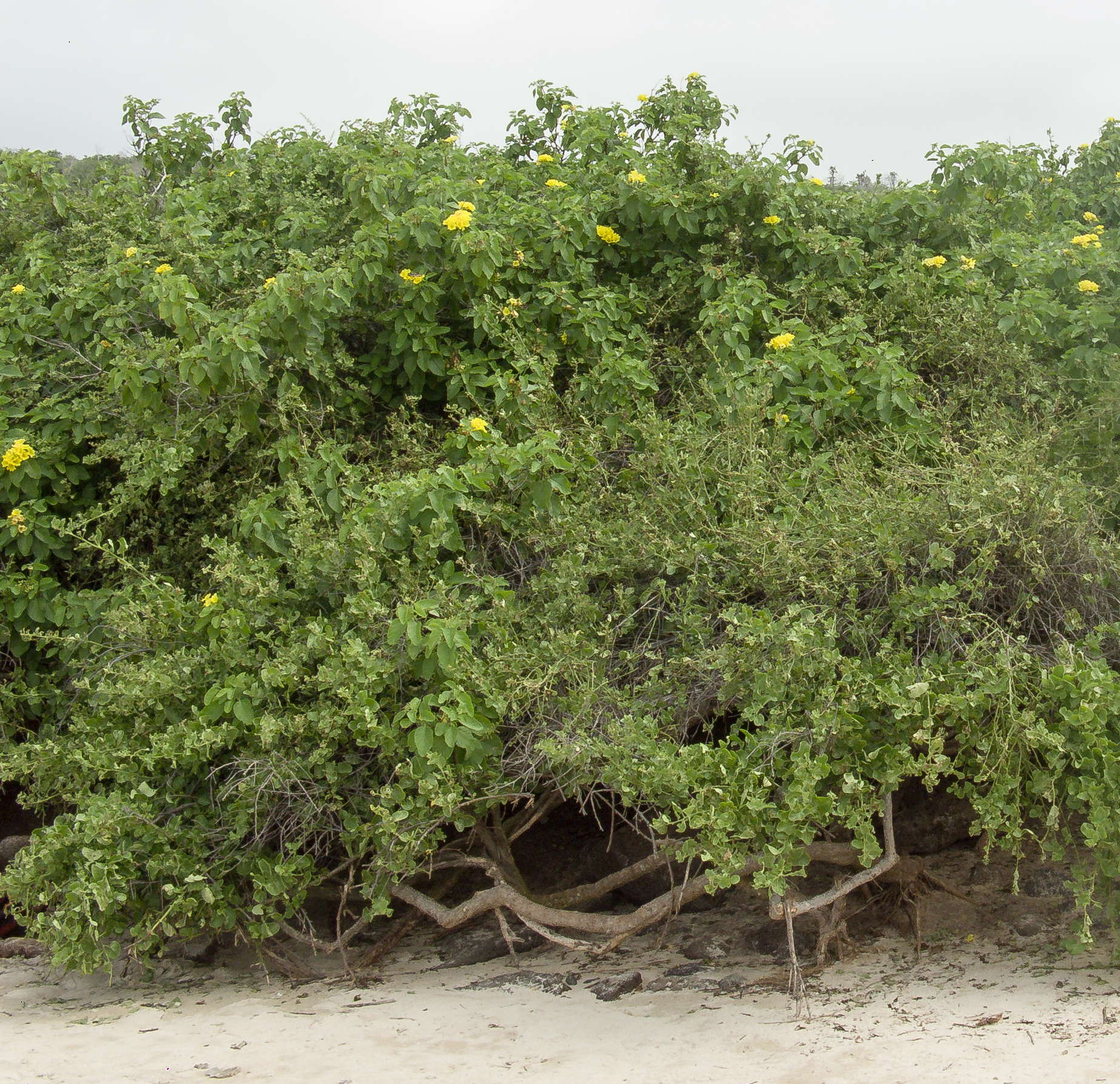
In habitat on the edge of a beach, with Cryptocarpus pyriformis, Santa Fé, Galapágos

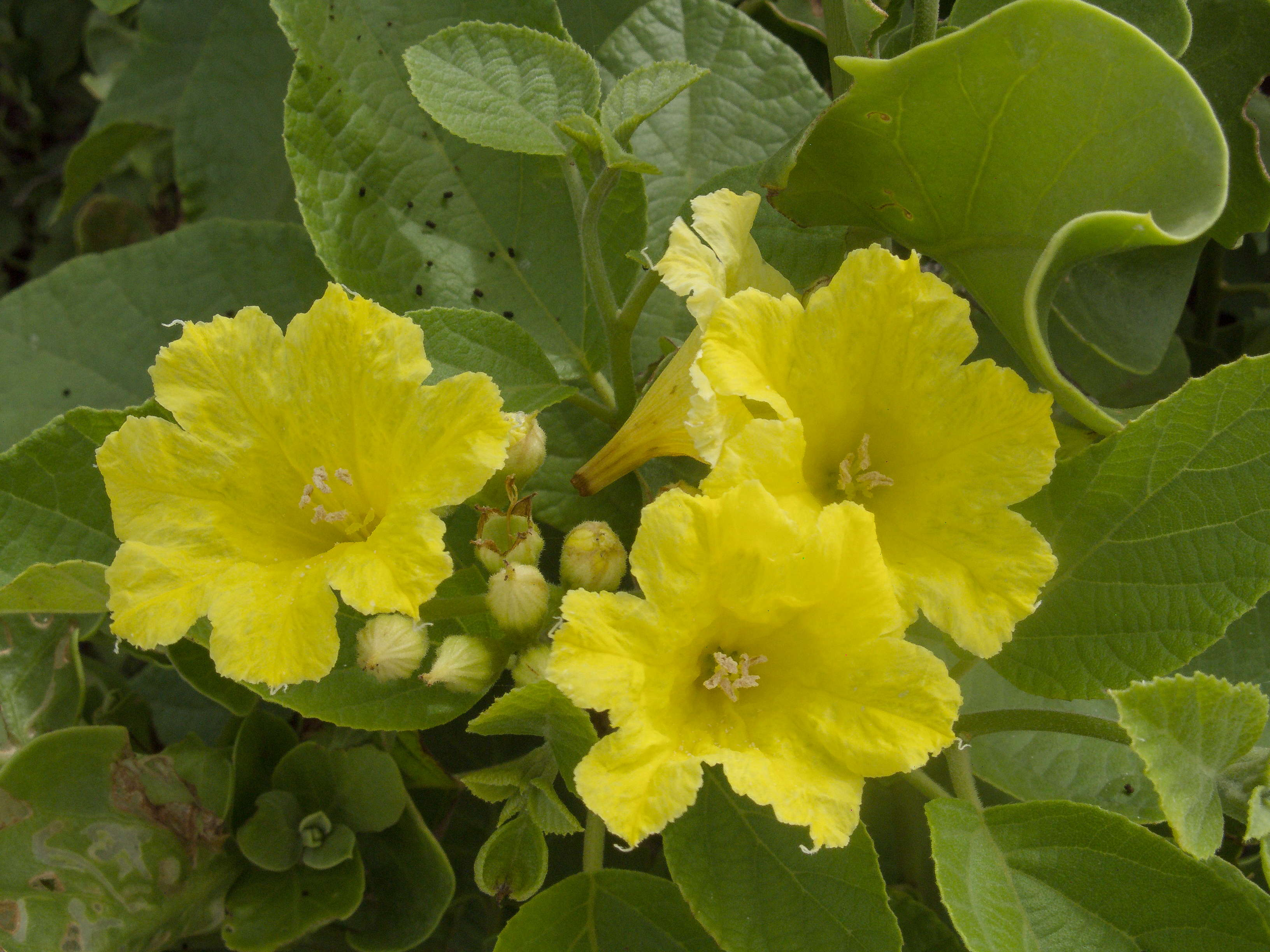
Flowers

== Taxonomy ==
Cordia lutea was first described scientifically in 1791 by the French botanist Jean-Baptiste Lamarck, with its origin said to be Peru. The specific epithet lutea means "yellow", more usually a deep yellow. In 1852, the Swedish botanist Nils Johan Andersson collected in the Galápagos Islands, and in 1855 described Varronia flava, now considered to be the same species as Cordia lutea.

In regions such as the Galápagos, where several species of Cordia occur, C. lutea is said to be easy to identify, "due to its showy yellow flowers".

=== Phylogeny ===
A molecular phylogenetic study in 2005 suggested that Cordia lutea is most closely related to C. dentata, both from the New World, and that these two are the sister of a large clade of Old World species, together forming the Myxa clade within the genus. It is suggested that the origin of the clade was in the New World, from where it was dispersed to Africa and beyond by birds.

== Distribution, habitat, and ecology ==
Cordia lutea is native to Ecuador, both the western part of the mainland and the Galápagos Islands, Peru, and the Marquesas Islands in Polynesia. It grows in arid regions. In the Galápagos, it is found in the lowlands, often close to the sea.

In the Galápagos, the leaves are mined by the moth Bucculatrix cordiaella.

== Bibliography ==
- McMullen, Conley K. (1999), Flowering Plants of the Galápagos, Ithaca, New York: Cornell University Press, ISBN 978-0-8014-8621-0
