= Cordia rickseckeri =

Scientific classification
- Kingdom: Plantae
- Clade: Embryophytes
- Clade: Tracheophytes
- Clade: Angiosperms
- Clade: Eudicots
- Clade: Asterids
- Order: Boraginales
- Family: Cordiaceae
- Genus: Cordia
- Species: C. rickseckeri

Binomial name
- Cordia rickseckeri Millsp.

Synonyms
- Sebestena rickseckeri (Millsp.) Britton

Species of plant

Cordia rickseckeri, known as San Bartolome and orange manjack, is a species of broadleaf plant described by Charles Frederick Millspaugh. Cordia rickseckeri is a member of the genus Cordia, and the family Cordiaceae. The species is endemic to Puerto Rico and the Virgin Islands. Traditional medicinal uses include the treatment of fever, inflammation, and skin diseases.
