= Cordia platythyrsa =

Conservation status
- Vulnerable (IUCN 3.1)

Scientific classification
- Kingdom: Plantae
- Clade: Tracheophytes
- Clade: Angiosperms
- Clade: Eudicots
- Clade: Asterids
- Order: Boraginales
- Family: Cordiaceae
- Genus: Cordia
- Species: C. platythyrsa

Binomial name
- Cordia platythyrsa Baker

Species of tree

Cordia platythyrsa or West African cordia is a tall, flowering tree in the family Cordiaceae, native to western and central Africa. Its soft wood is often used for furniture or other carpentry. It is considered "vulnerable" as it is threatened by logging.

Common names include ebe or mukumari (Cameroon, Gabon), omo (Nigeria), and tweneboa (Ghana).

== Range ==
West african cordia is native to Cameroon, Congo, Ivory Coast, Equatorial Guinea, Gabon, the Gambia, Ghana, Guinea, Guinea Bissau, Liberia, Nigeria, Senegal, Sierra Leone, Togo, and the Democratic Republic of the Congo.

== Description and uses ==
The tree grows to over 30 m in height and 1 m in diameter. The wood is pale yellow to almost white in color and used mainly for furniture making, interior joinery, domestic items, canoes, and musical instruments. It has low density (0.5 g/cm^{3}) and is very soft (Monnin hardness 1.3), with a spongy, fibrous texture.

== Status ==
The species is classified as vulnerable by the IUCN Red List of Threatened species, due to potential logging threats.
