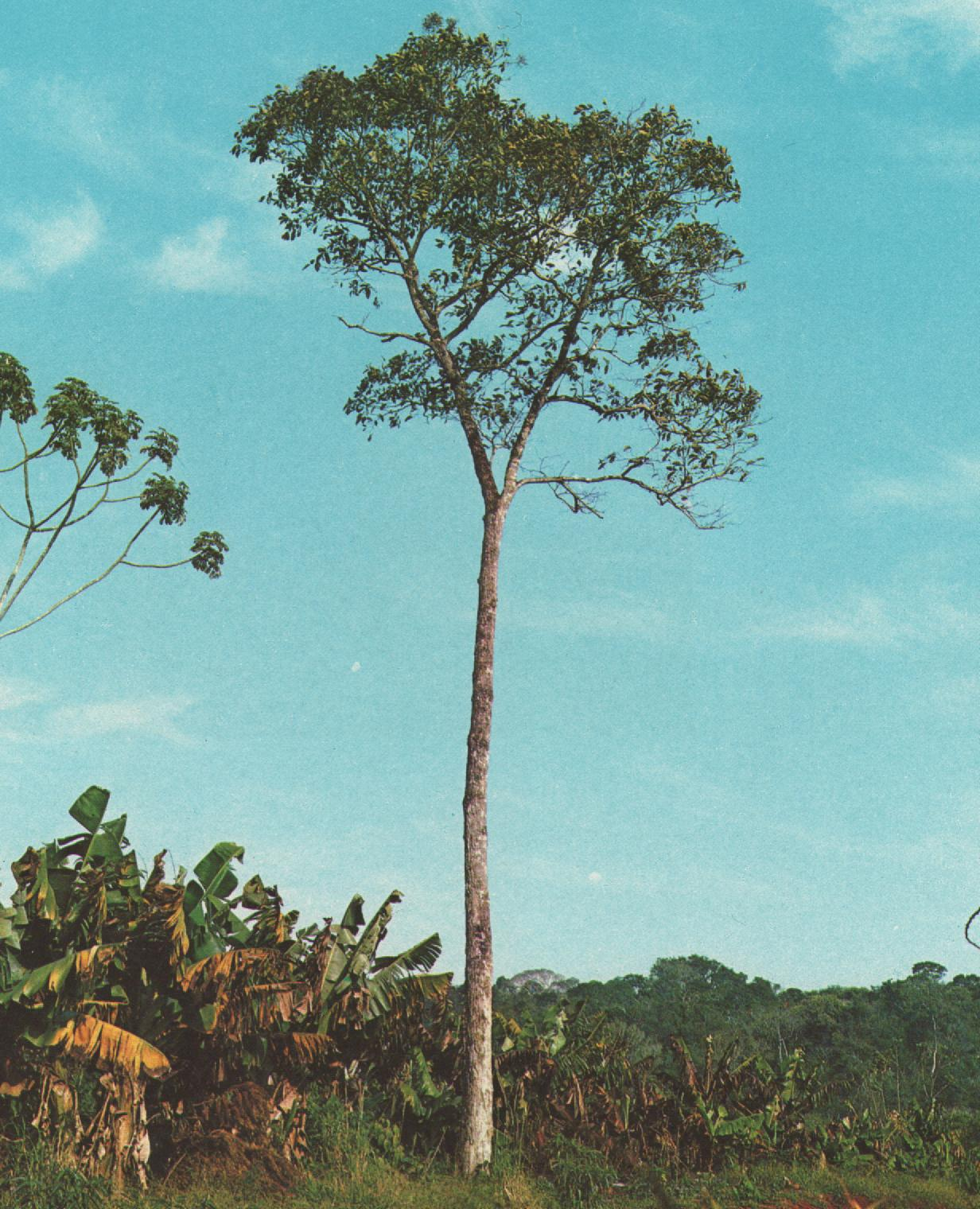
- Cordia trichotoma

Conservation status
- Least Concern (IUCN 3.1)

Scientific classification
- Kingdom: Plantae
- Clade: Embryophytes
- Clade: Tracheophytes
- Clade: Spermatophytes
- Clade: Angiosperms
- Clade: Eudicots
- Clade: Asterids
- Order: Boraginales
- Family: Cordiaceae
- Genus: Cordia
- Species: C. trichotoma

Binomial name
- Cordia trichotoma (Vell.) Arráb. ex Steud.

Synonyms
- Cordia asterophora Mart. ex Fresen.; Cordia chamissoniana var. aemilii Chodat; Cordia chamissoniana var. blanchetii Chodat; Cordia excelsa (Mart.) A.DC.; Cordia frondosa Schott; Cordia geraschanthus Jacq.; Cordia hassleriana Chodat

= Cordia trichotoma =

Species of medium-sized deciduous tree

Cordia trichotoma, or louro pardo, is a species of a medium-sized deciduous tree that belongs to the family Cordiaceae. It is a perennial species native to humid tropical and subtropical forests in Brazil, Bolivia, Argentina and others.

== Description ==
The tree is approximately 20–30 m (66–98 ft) tall, with trunk diameters of 70–90 cm (28–35 in). The flowers are white, with 5 petals each with an oval shape. The leaves are broad, simple and the fruit is a drupe. In Brazil, the tree is primarily found in the wilderness of the Amazonas.

== Cultivation ==
Cordia trichotoma is a pioneer species, primarily used and sold for high caliber furniture across the world because of its great wood quality and trunk form. The tailing business mostly led by the Brazilian makes the deciduous tree hard to come by, due to the difficulty of its seed propagation. Many of its natural resources are being threatened by environmental and human conditions.
