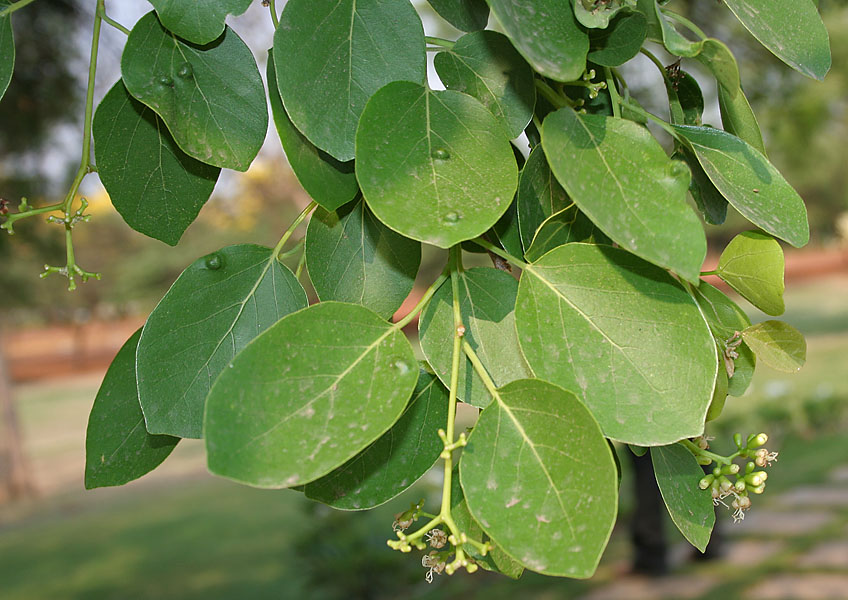
- Leaves in Hyderabad, India

Conservation status
- Least Concern (IUCN 3.1)

Scientific classification
- Kingdom: Plantae
- Clade: Embryophytes
- Clade: Tracheophytes
- Clade: Spermatophytes
- Clade: Angiosperms
- Clade: Eudicots
- Clade: Asterids
- Order: Boraginales
- Family: Cordiaceae
- Genus: Cordia
- Species: C. dichotoma

Binomial name
- Cordia dichotoma G.Forst.

Synonyms
- List: Cordia blancoi S.Vidal in Revis. Pl. Vasc. Filip.: 192 (1886); Cordia blancoi var. mollis Merr. in Publ. Bur. Sci. Gov. Lab. 35: 61-62 (1905); Cordia brownii A.DC. in A.P.de Candolle, Prodr. 9: 499 (1845); Cordia dichotoma var. brunnea Kurz in Forest Fl. Burma 2@ 208 (1877); Cordia griffithii C.B.Clarke in J.D.Hooker, Fl. Brit. India 4: 139 (1883); Cordia indica Lam. in Encycl. 7: 49 (1806); Cordia ixiocarpa F.Muell. in Fragm. 1: 59 (1858); Cordia latifolia Roxb. in Fl. Ind. 2: 330 (1824); Cordia loureiroi Roem. & Schult. in Syst. Veg., ed. 15[bis]. 4: 465 (1819); Cordia myxa var. ixiocarpa (F.Muell.) Domin in Biblioth. Bot. 22(89): 543 (1928); Cordia obliqua Willd. in Phytographia 1: 4 (1794); Cordia obliqua var. tomentosa Kazmi in J. Arnold Arbor. 51(2): 143 (1970), nom. superfl.; Cordia obliqua var. wallichii (G.Don) C.B.Clarke in J.D.Hooker, Fl. Brit. India 4: 137 (1883); Cordia premnifolia Ridl. in J. Straits Branch Roy. Asiat. Soc. 68: 12 (1915); Cordia suaveolens Blume in Bijdr. Fl. Ned. Ind.: 843 (1826); Cordia subdentata Miq. in Fl. Ned. Ind., Eerste Bijv.: 571 (1861); Cordia tomentosa Wall. in W.Roxburgh, Fl. Ind. 2: 339 (1824); Cordia tremula Griseb. in Fl. Brit. W. I.: 479 (1862); Cordia wallichii G.Don in Gen. Hist. 4: 379 (1837); Gerascanthus dichotomus (G.Forst.) Borhidi in Acta Bot. Hung. 34: 404 (1988); Gerascanthus griffithii (C.B.Clarke) Borhidi in Acta Bot. Hung. 34: 405 (1988); Gerascanthus suaveolens (Blume) Borhidi in Acta Bot. Hung. 34: 407 (1988); Lithocardium griffithii (C.B.Clarke) Kuntze in Revis. Gen. Pl. 2: 977 (1891); Lithocardium platyphyllum Kuntze in Revis. Gen. Pl. 2: 977 (1891); Lithocardium suaveolens (Blume) Kuntze in Revis. Gen. Pl. 2: 977 (1891); Lithocardium subdentatum Kuntze in Revis. Gen. Pl. 2: 977 (1891); Lithocardium tremulum (Griseb.) Kuntze in Revis. Gen. Pl. 2: 977 (1891); Sebestena indica (Lam.) Raf. in Sylva Tellur.: 38 (1838); Varronia integerrima Stokes in Bot. Mat. Med. 1: 424 (1812); Varronia sinensis Lour. in Fl. Cochinch.: 138 (1790)

= Cordia dichotoma =

Species of plant

Cordia dichotoma is a species of flowering tree in the family Cordiaceae, that is native to the Indomalayan realm, northern Australia, and western Melanesia.

Common names in English include fragrant manjack, clammy cherry, glue berry tree and Indian cherry.

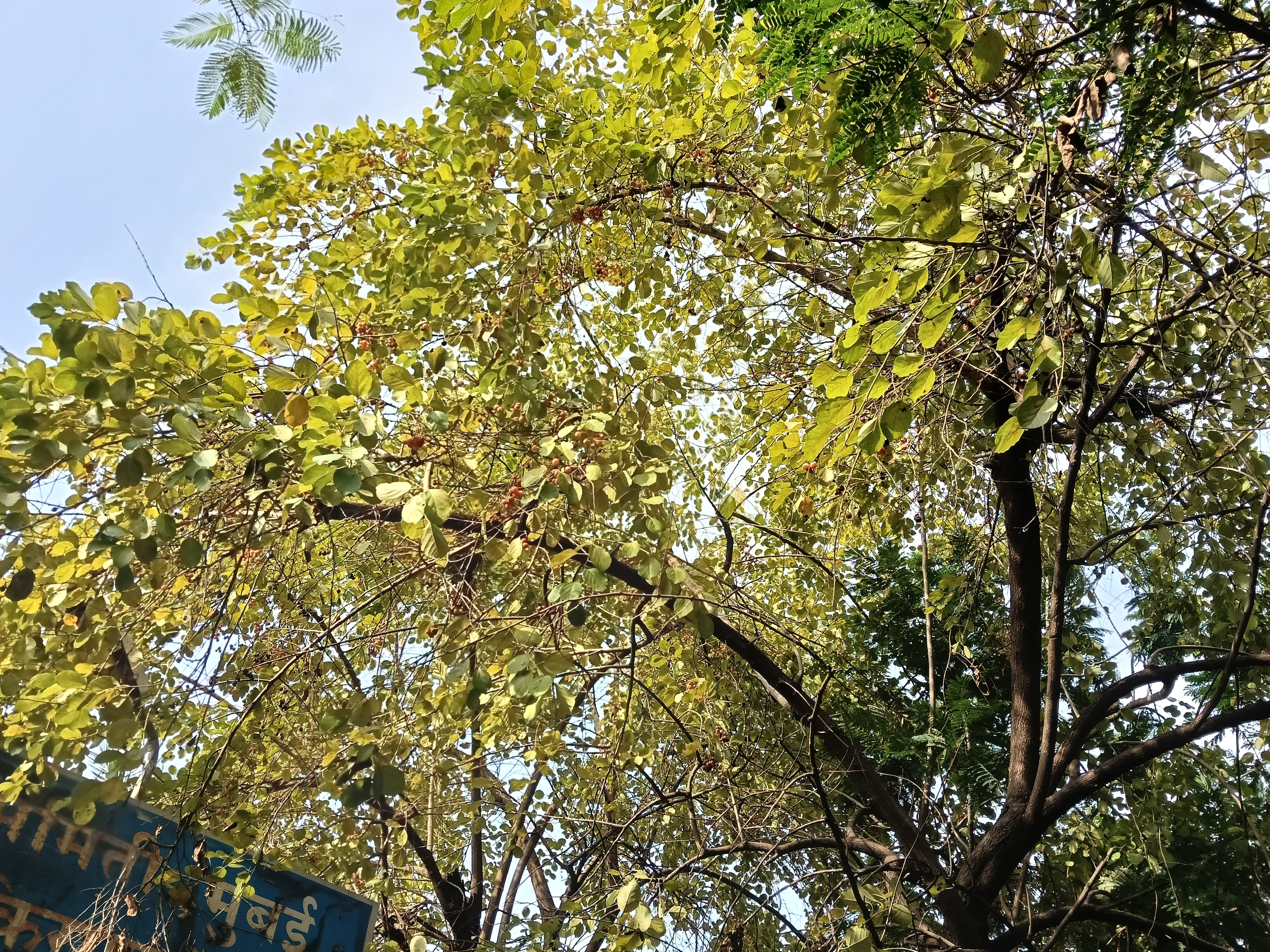
Tree at Turbhe APMC market in Navi Mumbai

== Description ==
Cordia dichotoma is a small to moderate-sized deciduous tree with a short bole and spreading crown. The stem bark is greyish brown, smooth or longitudinally wrinkled. Flowers are short-stalked, bisexual, white in colour which open only at night. The fruit is a yellow or pinkish-yellow shining globose which turns black on ripening and the pulp gets viscid.

Botany

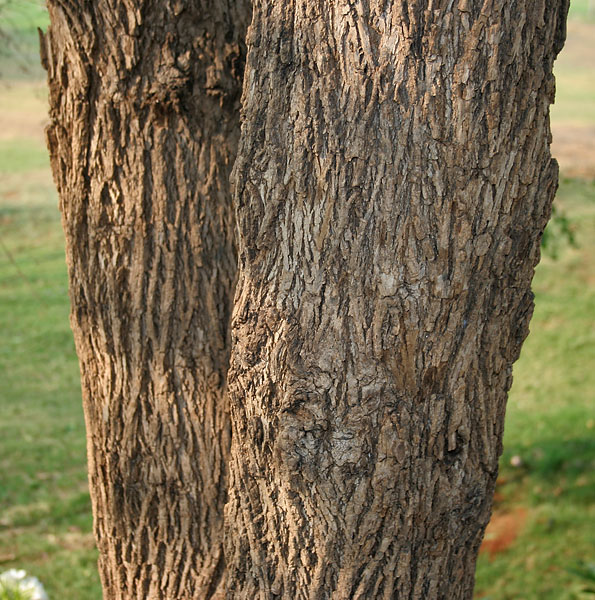
Trunk

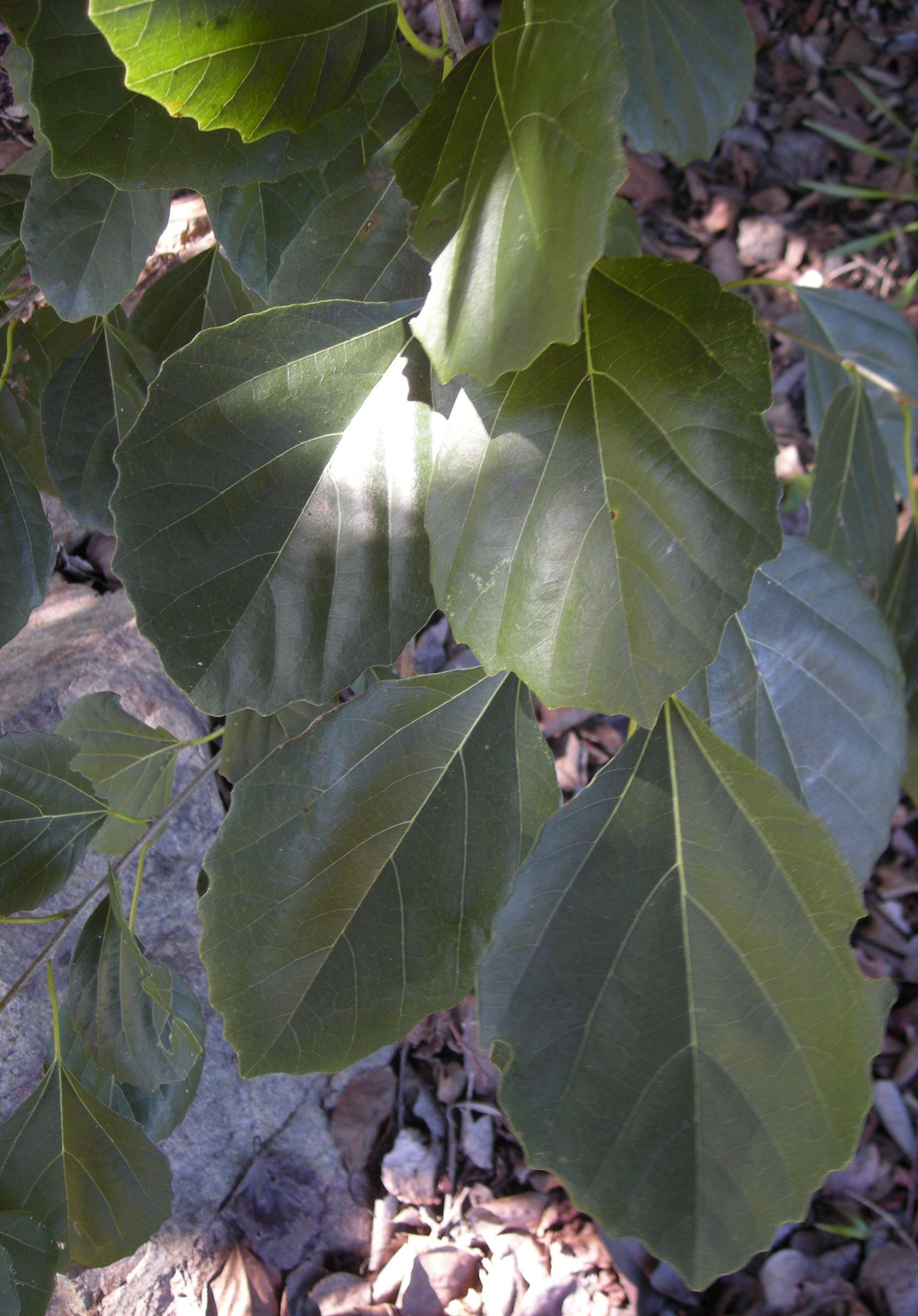
Foliage

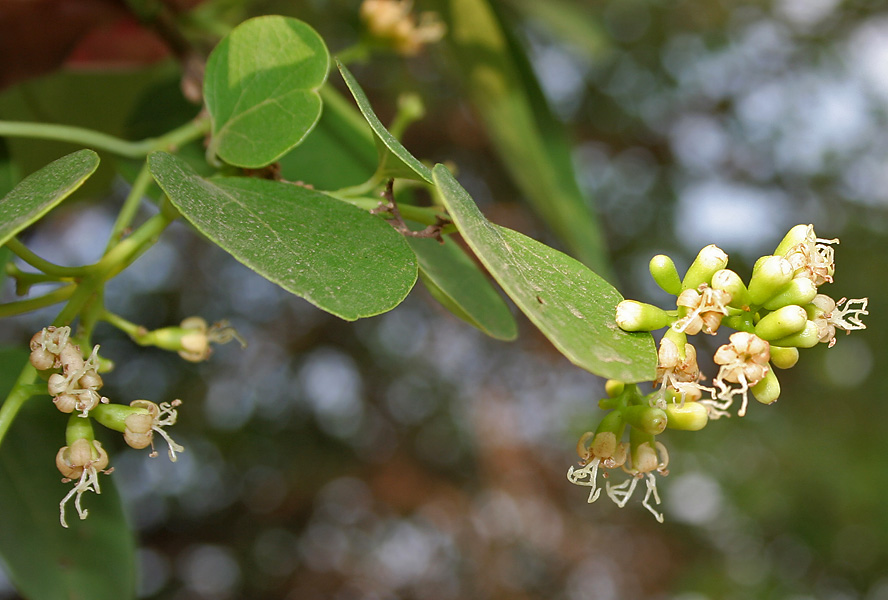
Flowers

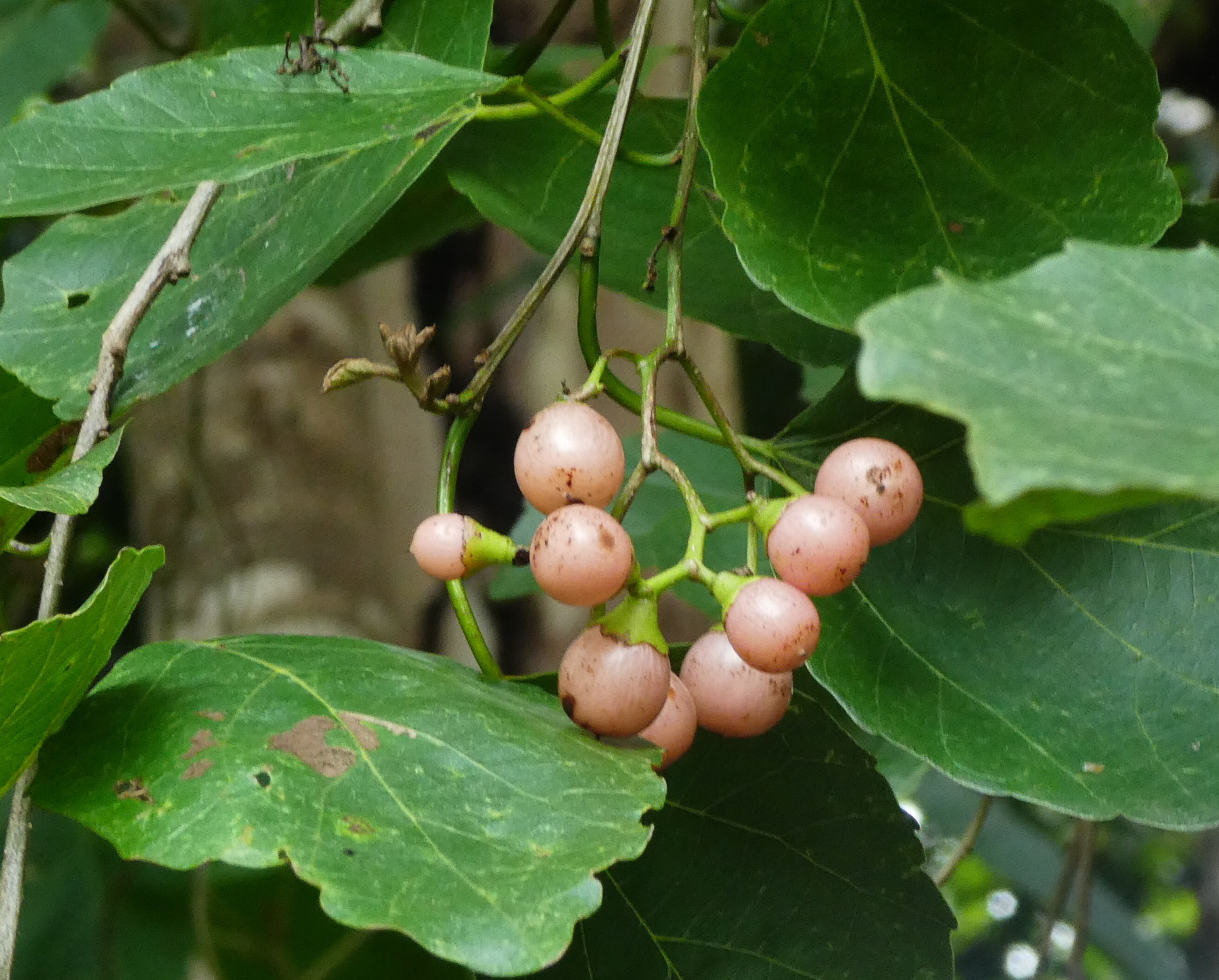
Fruits

== Habitat and range ==
Cordia dichotoma is native to China (Fujian, Guangdong Guangxi, Guizhou, southeast Tibet, and Yunnan) the Ryukyu Islands of Japan, Taiwan, India (including East and West Himalayas,), Pakistan, Sri Lanka, Cambodia, Laos, Burma, Philippines, Thailand, Vietnam, Indonesia, Malaysia, Papua New Guinea, Australia (Northern Territory and Queensland), New Caledonia and Vanuatu. It is a tree of tropical and subtropical regions. It is found in a variety of forests ranging from the dry deciduous forests of Rajasthan to the moist deciduous forests of Western Ghats and tidal forests in Myanmar.

It has been introduced into Cuba, Florida, Guatemala, Leeward Islands, Marianas, Mexico, Puerto Rico, Tobago, Trinidad and the Windward Islands.

== Ecology ==
The larvae of the butterfly Arhopala micale feed on leaves of C. dichotoma.

== Uses ==
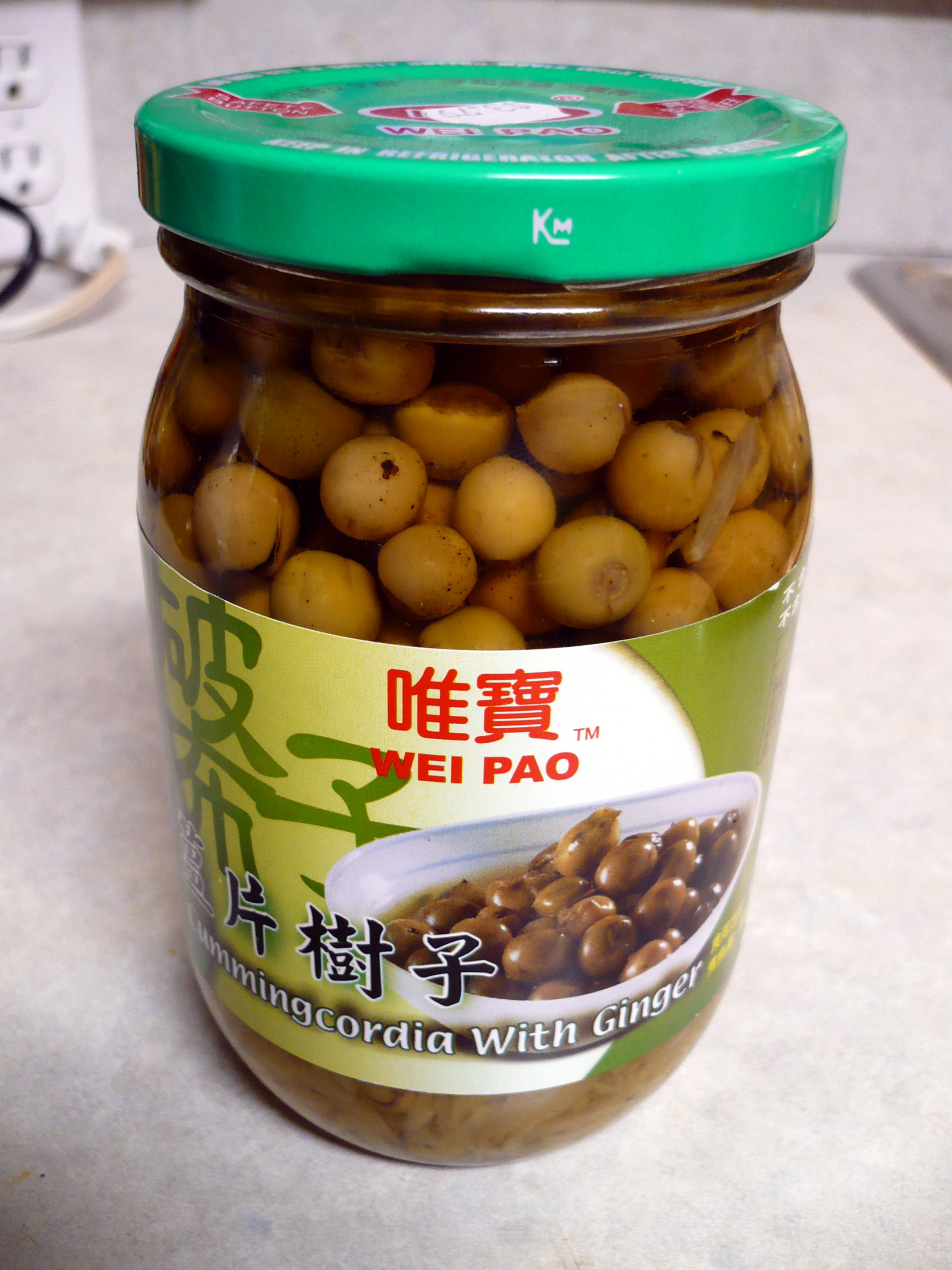
A jar of the fruits with ginger, Taiwan

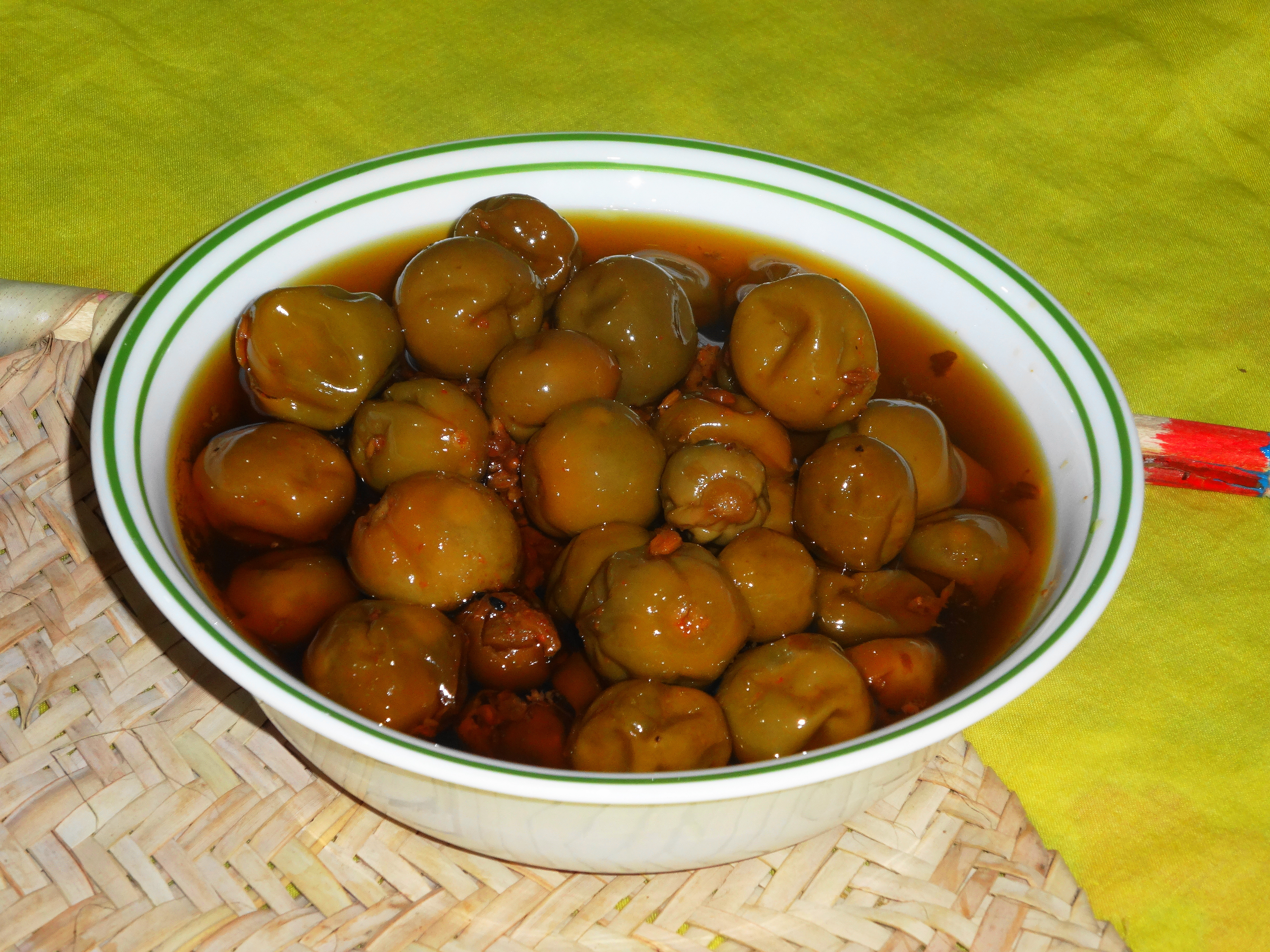
Lasora achar, pickle made of the fruits, Pakistan

The immature fruits are used in South Asian pickles, and as a vegetable fodder. The leaves yield good fodder. The fruits of C. dichotoma are edible.

'Joshanda' is a Unani herbal medicine, known for its ability to manage colds, coughs, sore throats, nasal congestion, respiratory problems, and fevers. It consists of seeds of 'Khatmi' (Althaea officinalis), fruits of 'Sapistan' (Cordia dichotoma), dried rhizomes of 'mulethi '(Glycyrrhiza glabra), seeds of 'Khubbazi' (Malva rotundifolia), leaves of 'Gaozaban' (Onosma bracteatum), flowers of Banafsha (Viola odorata) and the dried fruits of 'Unnab' (Ziziphus jujuba). Its fruits of C. dichotoma are a rich source of polysaccharides and are potential sources of phytochemicals with antibacterial and antioxidant activities.

== Symbolism ==
The species is the symbol of Phra Nakhon Si Ayutthaya Province in Thailand.
