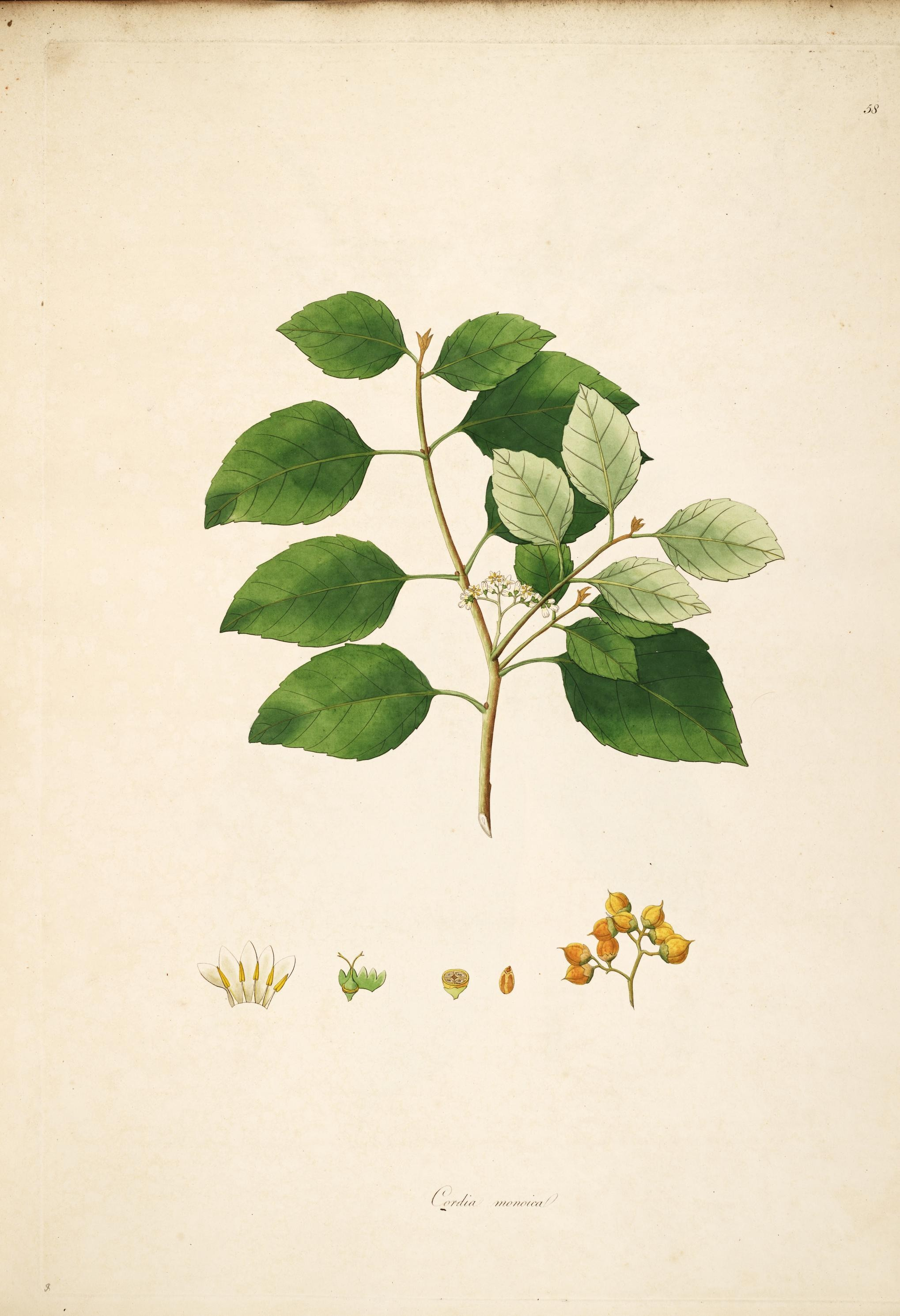
- Cordia monoica, illustration from the species description

Conservation status
- Least Concern (IUCN 3.1)

Scientific classification
- Kingdom: Plantae
- Clade: Tracheophytes
- Clade: Angiosperms
- Clade: Eudicots
- Clade: Asterids
- Order: Boraginales
- Family: Cordiaceae
- Genus: Cordia
- Species: C. monoica

Binomial name
- Cordia monoica Roxb.

Synonyms
- Cordia bakeri Britten; Cordia dioica Bojer ex A.DC.; Cordia diversa Thwaites; Cordia kabarensis De Wild.; Cordia obovata Baker [Illegitimate]; Cordia ovalis R.Br. ex A.DC.; Cordia polygama Roxb.; Cordia quarensis Gürke; Cordia rubra Hochst. ex A.Rich.; Gerascanthus bakeri (Britten) Borhidi; Gerascanthus dioicus (Bojer ex A.DC.) Borhidi; Gerascanthus monoicus (Roxb.) Borhidi [Invalid]; Lithocardium monoicum Kuntze; Lithocardium ovale Kuntze

= Cordia monoica =

Sandpaper saucer-berry

Species of flowering plant

Cordia monoica, the sandpaper saucer-berry, or snot berry, is a species of flowering tree in the family Cordiaceae, that is native to India, Sri Lanka and in African countries from Sudan, Ethiopia, Somalia, Kenya, Zimbabwe down to South Africa.
