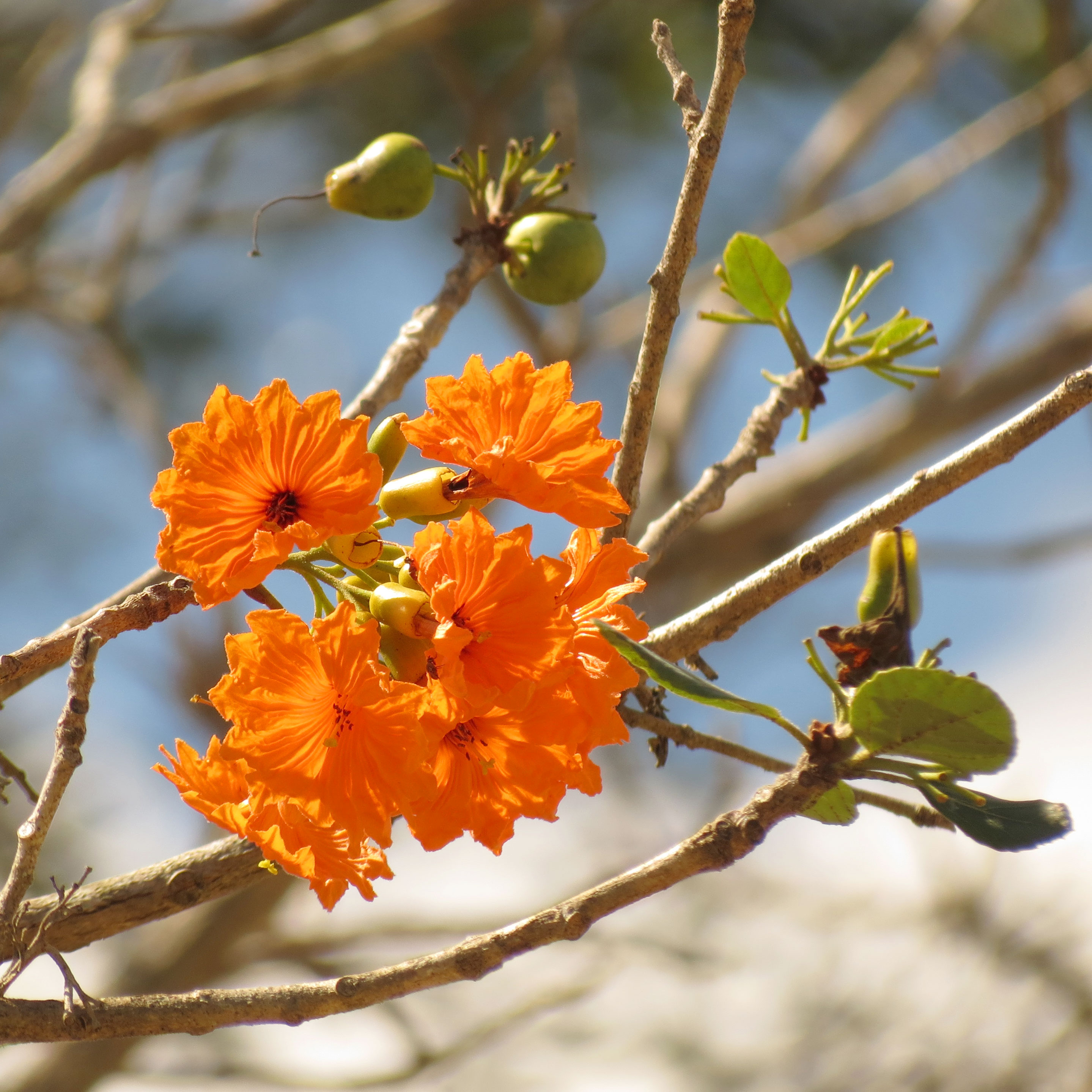
- At the sitio arqueológico Uxmal in Yucatán, Mexico

Scientific classification
- Kingdom: Plantae
- Clade: Tracheophytes
- Clade: Angiosperms
- Clade: Eudicots
- Clade: Asterids
- Order: Boraginales
- Family: Cordiaceae
- Genus: Cordia
- Species: C. dodecandra

Binomial name
- Cordia dodecandra DC.

Synonyms
- Cordia angiocarpa A.Rich.; Lithocardium angiocarpum (A.Rich.) Kuntze; Lithocardium dodecandrum (A.DC.) Kuntze; lethostephia angiocarpa (A.Rich.) Miers

= Cordia dodecandra =

Species of flowering plant

Cordia dodecandra (common name: ziricote) is a small tree in the family Cordiaceae native to southern Mexico, Central America, and the Caribbean.

== Description ==
Cordia dodecandra grows to a maximum height of 7.5–9 m (25–30 ft) at maturity. Flowers are produced in clusters at branch ends from February to May. Each flower is 50 mm (2 in) wide, bright orange in color, tubular, flaring (salverform) with 11–18 lobes, bearing 13–18 stamens that are not equal in length. Short stamens are intercalated between long ones, resulting in two levels of stamens. The species is heterostylous and has been shown to be self-incompatible. White fruits follow the flowers, averaging 50 mm (2 in) in length. The fruits are locally made into sweets which are traditionally used to celebrate Day of the Dead.

== Uses ==
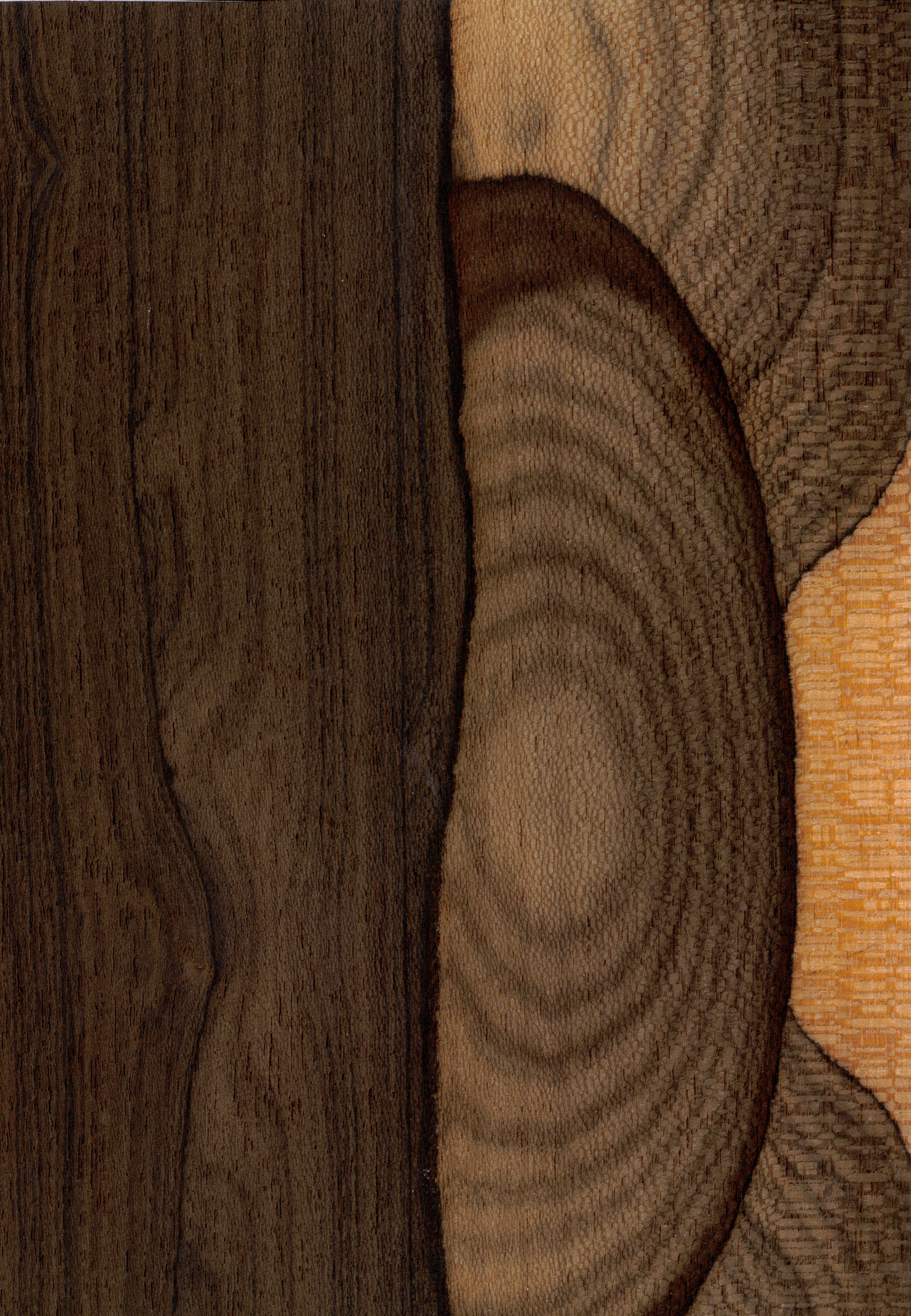
Ziricote wood

Ziricote wood is dark brown in color and has a Janka hardness of 8.8 kN (1,970 lbf). It is used for furniture, veneer, cabinetry, flooring, gun stocks, musical instruments (including guitars and ukuleles), entrance doors, turnings, decorative beams, trim, and small specialty items.

== Gallery ==
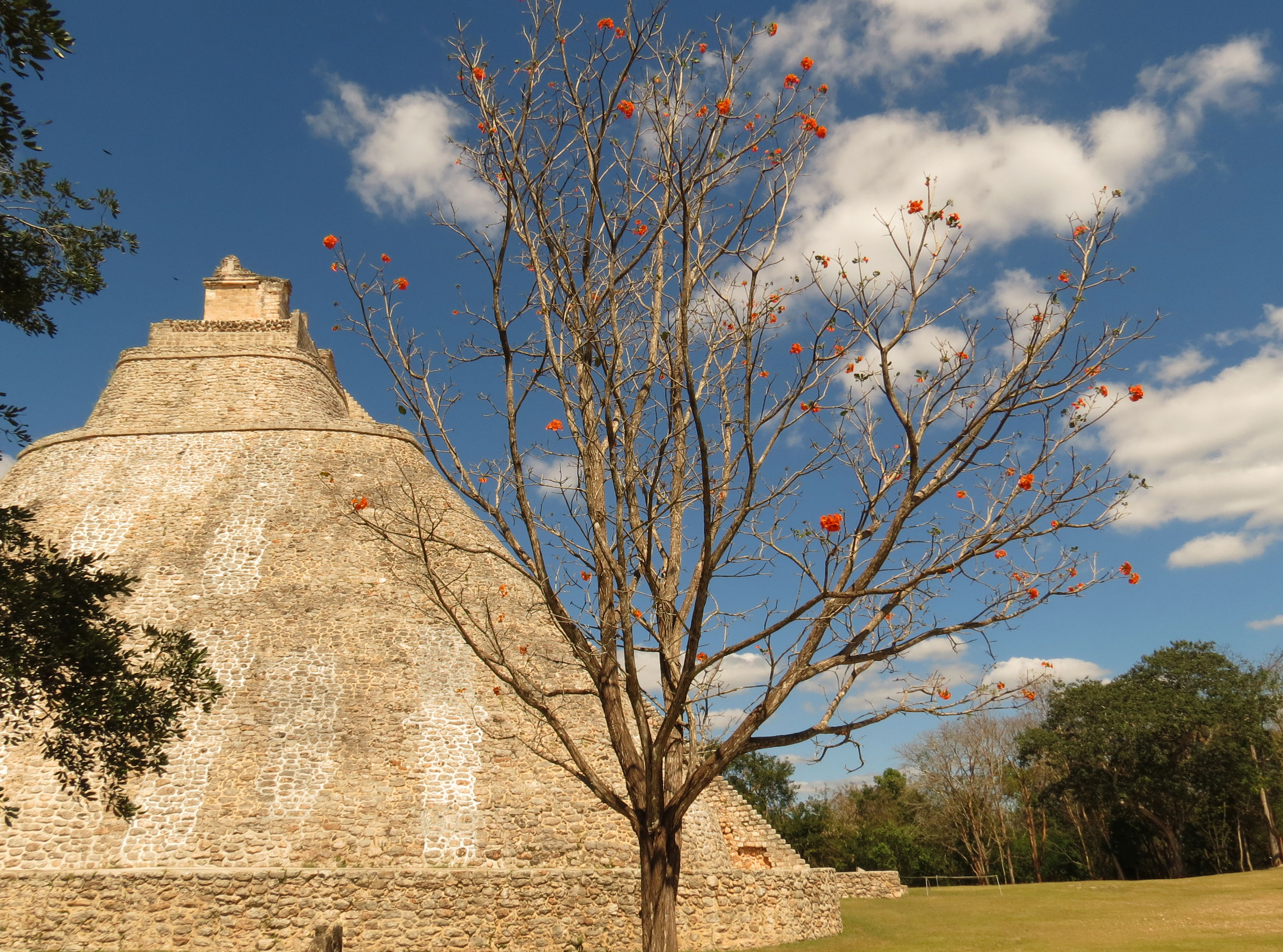
Ziricote tree in Yucatán, Mexico
