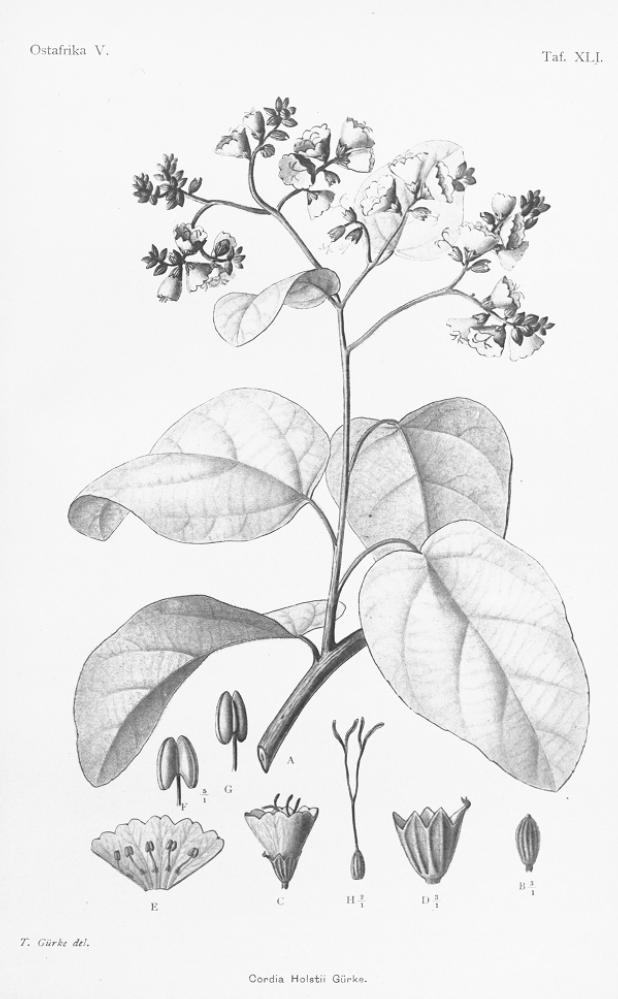

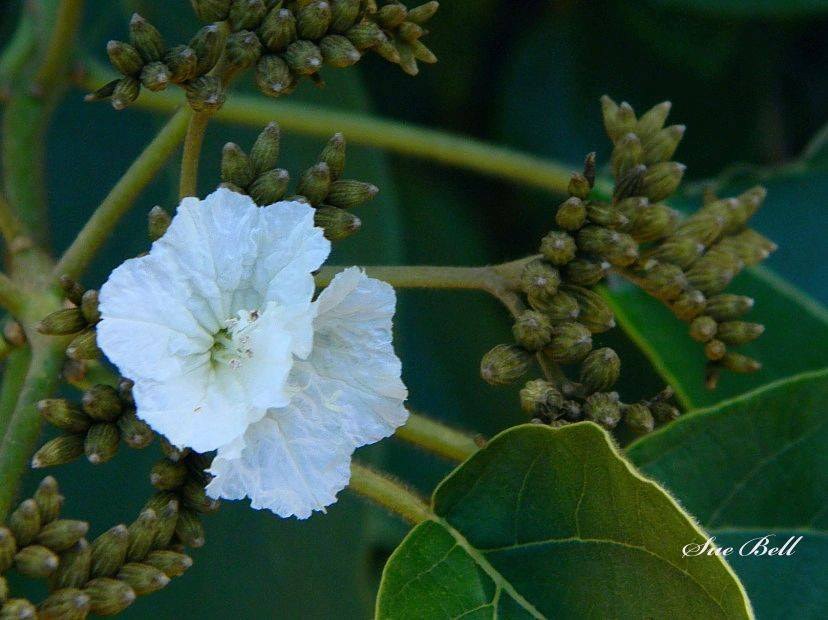

Conservation status
- Least Concern (IUCN 3.1)

Scientific classification
- Kingdom: Plantae
- Clade: Embryophytes
- Clade: Tracheophytes
- Clade: Spermatophytes
- Clade: Angiosperms
- Clade: Eudicots
- Clade: Asterids
- Order: Boraginales
- Family: Cordiaceae
- Genus: Cordia
- Species: C. africana

Binomial name
- Cordia africana Lam.

Synonyms
- Cordia holstii Gürke ex Engl.; Cordia abyssinica R.Br. ex A.Rich.; Cordia abyssinica R. Br.; Cordia unyorensis Stapf; Gerascanthus africanus (Lam.) Borhidi; Gerascanthus holstii (Gürke ex Engl.) M.Kuhlm. & Mattos

= Cordia africana =

Species of tree

Cordia africana or Sudan teak is a mid-sized, white-flowered, evergreen tree in the family Cordiaceae, native to Africa. It produces edible fruit, and its wood is used for drums or other carpentry.

== Uses ==
Cordia africana has been used in the manufacture of drums. The Akan Drum which is now in the British Museum was identified as being of African manufacture because it was found to be made from this tree. It is also sometime called Sudan Teak and has been used for flooring, high-quality furniture, window making, interior decking. The wood can be used to manufacture beehives which can be kept in this tree where the bees can live off the plentiful supply of nectar which comes from the flowers. In addition the tree supplies leaves for forage and an edible fruit.

In Ethiopia, where the tree is known in Amharic as wanza, the hearth of a fire-stick was traditionally made therefrom for lighting fires.

== Gallery ==
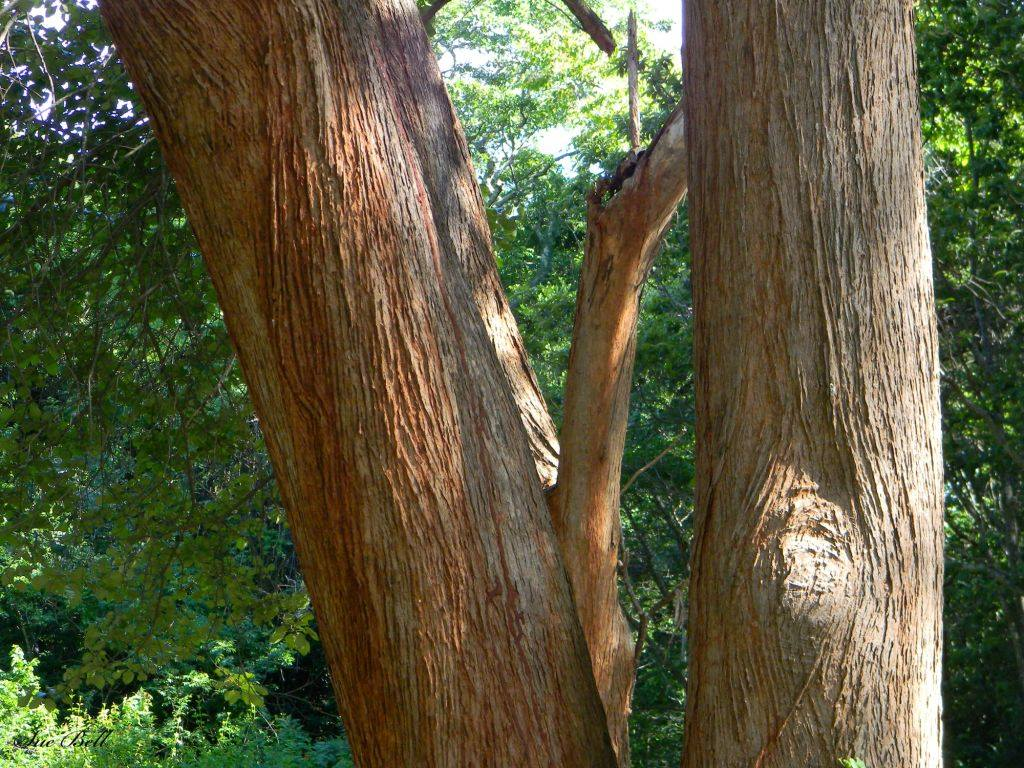
Bark and trunk

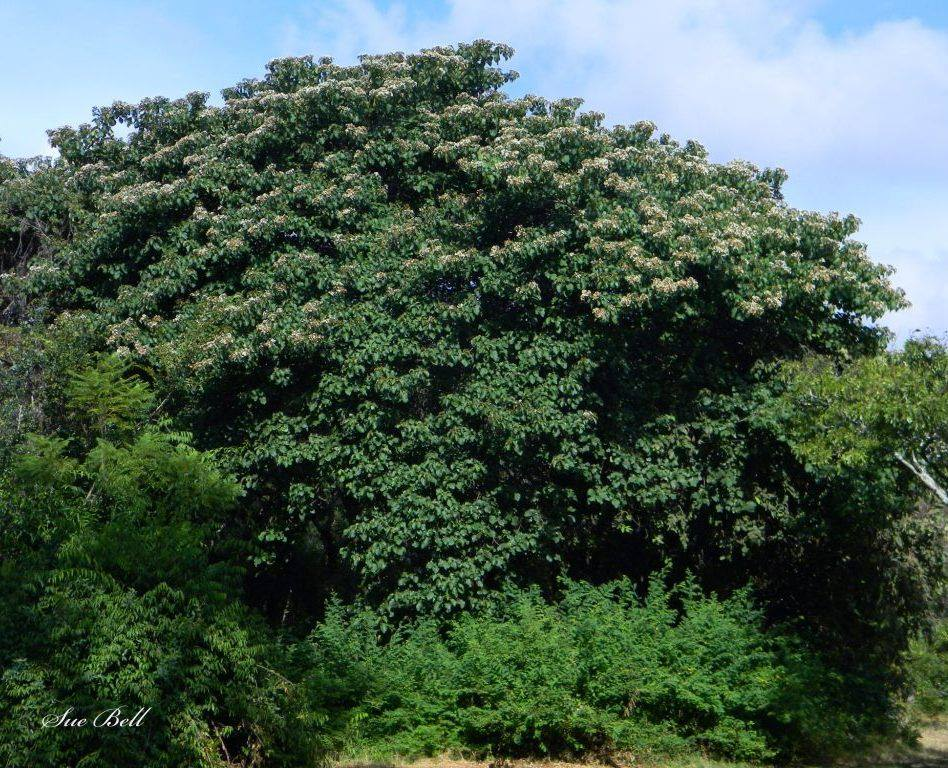
Crown

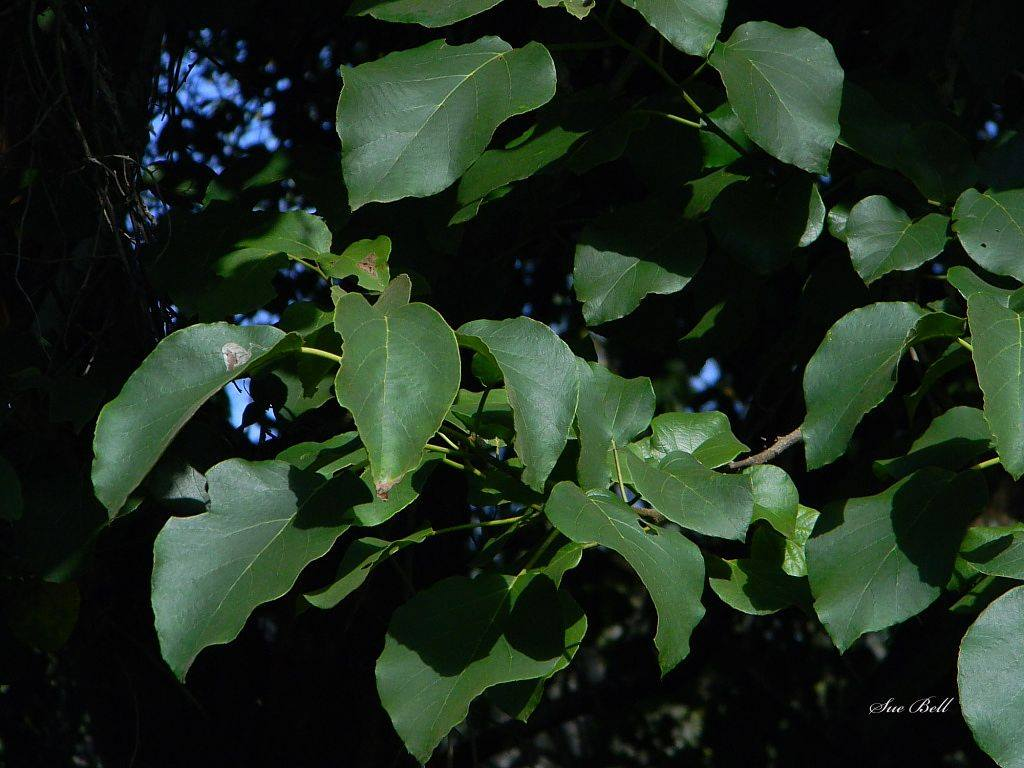
Foliage
