= Bucculatrix cordiaella =

Scientific classification
- Kingdom: Animalia
- Phylum: Arthropoda
- Clade: Pancrustacea
- Class: Insecta
- Order: Lepidoptera
- Family: Bucculatricidae
- Genus: Bucculatrix
- Species: B. cordiaella

Binomial name
- Bucculatrix cordiaella Davis & Landry, 2002

Species of moth

Bucculatrix cordiaella is a moth in the family Bucculatricidae. It is found on Galapagos Islands (Floreana, Genovesa, Isabela, Santa Cruz, Santiago and Seymour Norte). It was described in 2002 by Donald R. Davis and Bernard Landry.

The length of the forewings is 1.8–2.2 mm. It mines leaves of Cordia lutea.
