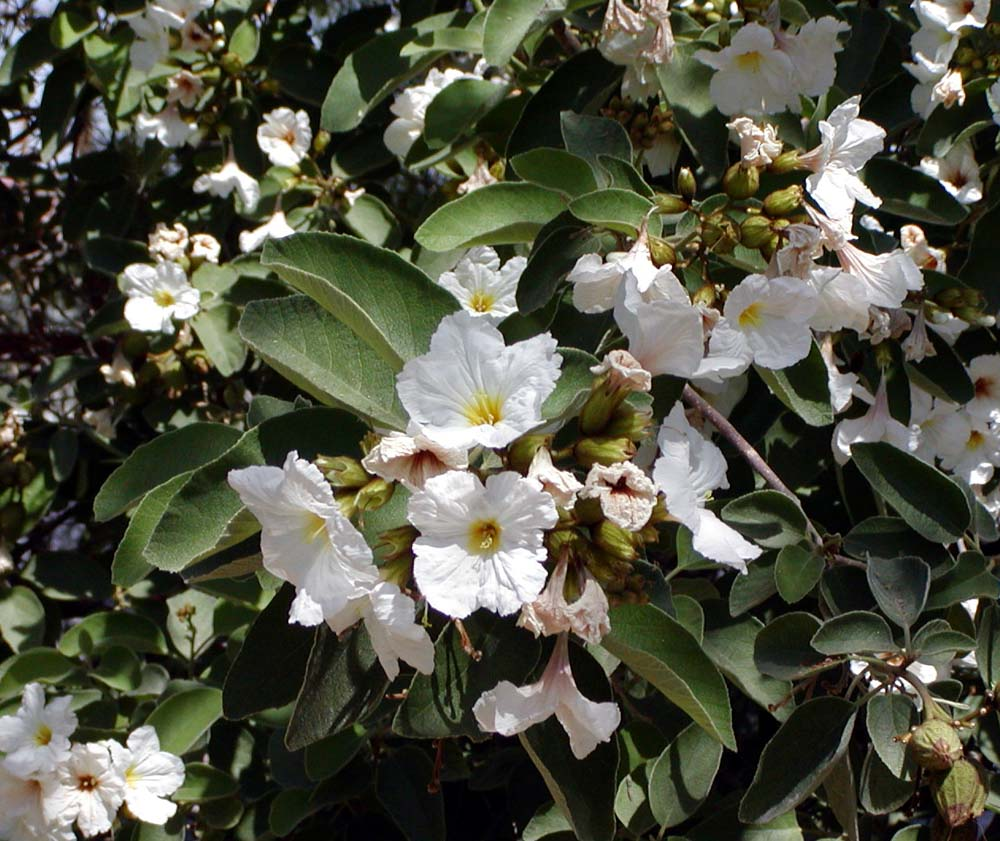
- Cordia boissieri in bloom
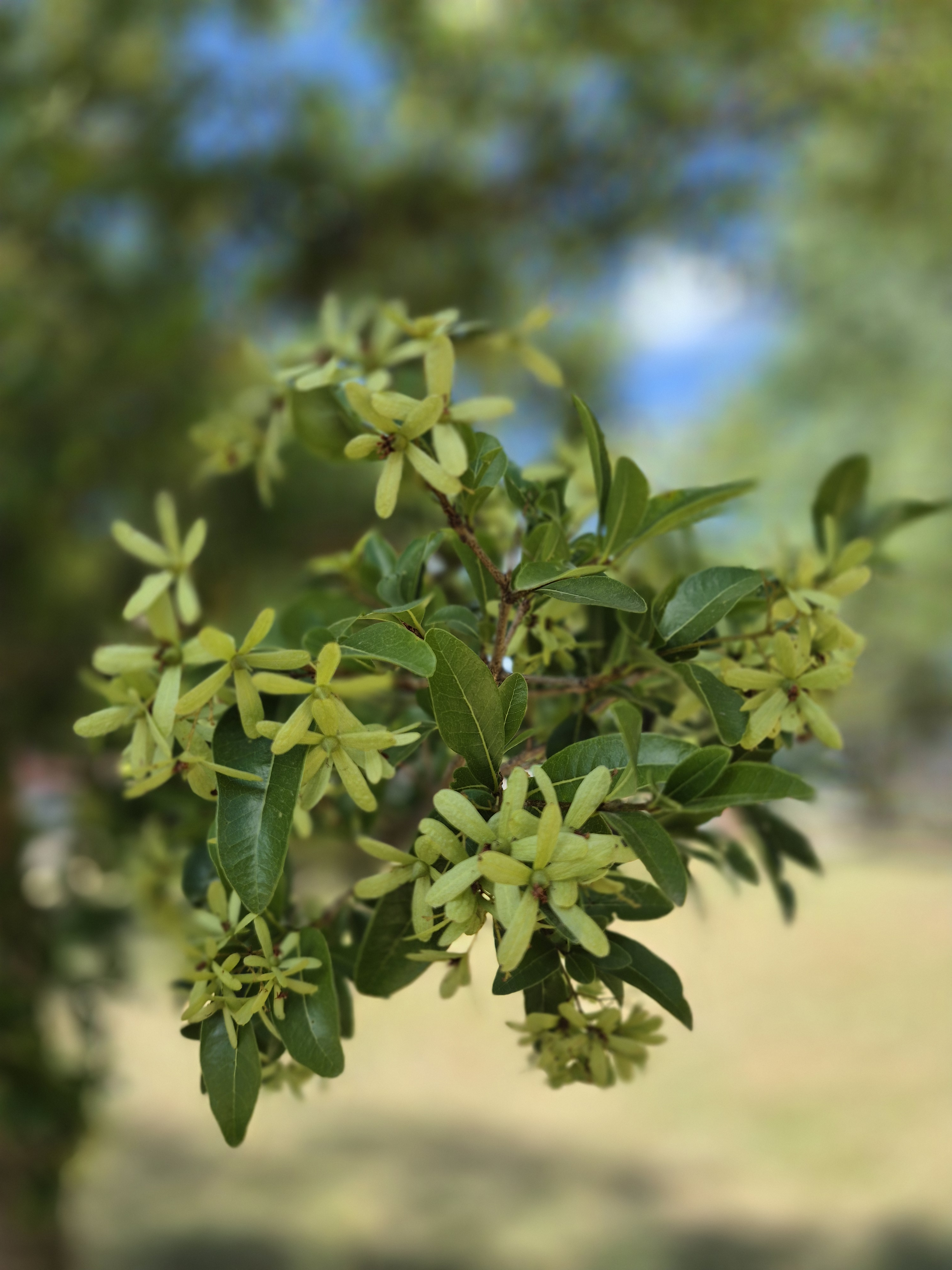
- Cordia americana, flowers

Scientific classification
- Kingdom: Plantae
- Clade: Tracheophytes
- Clade: Angiosperms
- Clade: Eudicots
- Clade: Asterids
- Order: Boraginales
- Family: Cordiaceae
- Genus: Cordia; L.

Type species
- Cordia myxa L.

Species
- 228; see text

Synonyms
- List: Acnadena Raf.; Ascanica Crantz; Auxemma Miers; Borellia Neck., opus utique oppr.; Bourgia Scop.; Calyptracordia Britton; Carpiphea Raf.; Catonia Raf., nom. illeg.; Cerdana Ruiz & Pav.; Cienkowskia Regel & Rach; Coilanthera Raf.; Collococcus P.Browne; Colococca Raf.; Cordiada Vell.; Cordiopsis Desv.; Ectemis Raf.; Gerascanthus P.Browne; Gynaion A.DC.; Hemigymnia Griff.; Lithocardium L. ex Kuntze, nom. superfl.; Macielia Vand.; Macria Ten., nom. illeg.; Myxa (Endl.) Lindl.; Novella Raf.; Paradigma Miers; Patagonica Boehm., nom. superfl.; Patagonula L.; Physoclada (DC.) Lindl.; Pilicordia (A.DC.) Lindl.; Plethostephia Miers; Purkinjia C.Presl; Quarena Raf.; Rhabdocalyx Lindl.; Saccellium Bonpl.; Salimori Adans.; Sebestena Gaertn., nom. illeg.; Sebestena Boehm.; Toquera Raf.; Tsiemtani Adans.

= Cordia =

Genus of flowering plants in the borage family

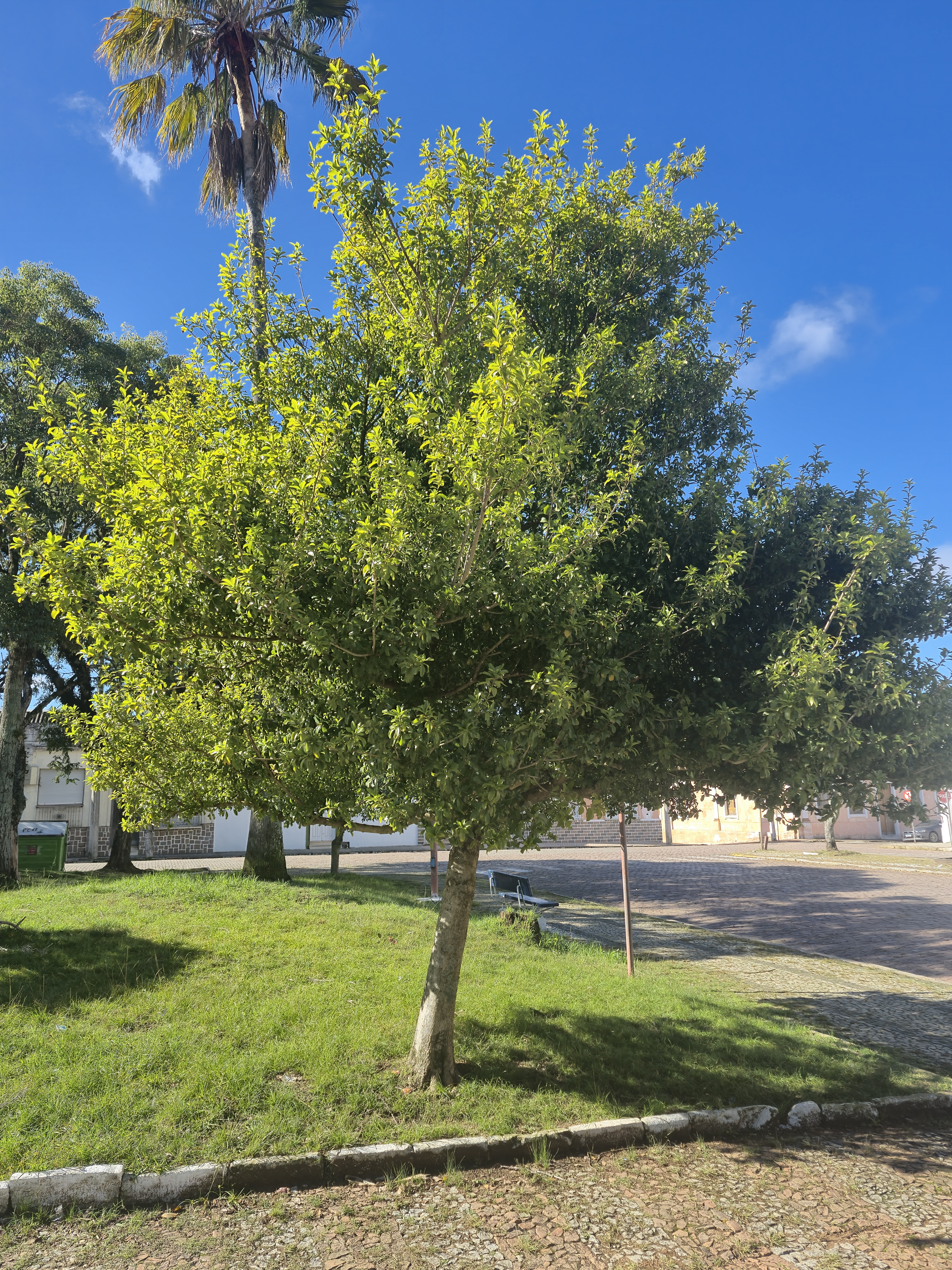
Cordia americana in Brazil

Cordia is a genus of flowering plants in the family Cordiaceae. It contains 228 species of shrubs and trees, that are found in tropical and subtropical regions worldwide. Many of the species are commonly called manjack, while bocote may refer to several Central American species in Spanish.

The generic name honours German botanist and pharmacist Valerius Cordus (1515–1544). Like most other Boraginales, the majority have trichomes (hairs) on the leaves.

== Taxonomy ==
The taxonomy of Cordia is complex and controversial. Gottschling et al. (2005) say this is partly due to "extraordinarily high intraspecific variability" in some groups of species, making identification difficult, and partly due to new taxa having been "airily described on the basis of poorly preserved herbarium specimens".

=== Selected species ===
- Cordia africana Lam. – White manjack
- Cordia alliodora (Ruiz & Pav.) Oken – Spanish elm, Ecuador laurel, salmwood, bocote (Neotropics)
- Cordia boissieri A.DC. – Anacahuita, Texas olive (southern Texas, Northern Mexico)
- Cordia dentata Poir. – White manjack
- Cordia dichotoma G.Forst – Fragrant manjack, bird lime tree (Tropical Asia and Australasia)
- Cordia lutea Lam. – Yellow cordia (western South America, including the Galápagos Islands)
- Cordia monoica
- Cordia myxa L. – Assyrian plum (South Asia)
  Cordia domestica is treated as a separate species by some sources, and as C. myxa var. domestica by others. Cordia obliqua Willd. (the clammy cherry) has been placed in the "Cordia myxa complex", or treated as a synonym for Cordia dichotoma.
- Cordia platythyrsa Baker – West African cordia
- Cordia sebestena L. – Geiger tree, large-leaf Geigertree (southern Florida, Greater Antilles, Central America)
- Cordia sinensis Lam. (=C. gharaf) – Grey-leafed saucerberry
- Cordia subcordata Lam. – Kou, tou, marer (Africa, South Asia, Southeast Asia, northern Australia, Pacific Islands)
- Cordia sulcata DC. – Mucilage manjack, laylay, white manjack, wild clammy cherry
- Cordia trichotoma (Vell.) Arráb. ex Steud.

=== Formerly placed here ===
- Carmona retusa (Vahl) Masam. (as C. retusa Vahl)

== Ecology ==
Cordia species are used as food plants by the caterpillars of some Lepidoptera species, such as Endoclita malabaricus, Bucculatrix caribbea, and Bucculatrix cordiaella. The wild olive tortoise beetle (Physonota alutacea) feeds on C. boissieri, C. dentata, C. inermis, and C. macrostachya.

== Uses ==
=== Ornamental ===
Many members of this genus have fragrant, showy flowers and are popular in gardens, although they are not especially hardy.

=== As food ===
A number of the tropical species have edible fruits, known by a wide variety of names including clammy cherries, glue berries, sebesten, or snotty gobbles. In India, the fruits of local species are used as a vegetable, raw, cooked, or pickled, and are known by many names, including lasora in Hindi. One such species is fragrant manjack (C. dichotoma), which is called gunda or tenti dela in Hindi and lasura in Nepali. The fruit of the fragrant manjack is called phoà-pò·-chí (破布子), 樹子仔, or 樹子(Pe̍h-ōe-jī: chhiū-chí) in Taiwan where they are eaten pickled.

=== Glue ===
The white, gooey inner pulp of the fruits is traditionally used to make glue.

=== Wood ===
The wood of several Cordia species is commercially harvested. Ecuador laurel (C. alliodora), ziricote (C. dodecandra), Spanish elm (C. gerascanthus), and C. goeldiana are used to make furniture and doors in Central and South America.

Ziricote and bocote are sometimes used as tonewoods for making the backs and sides of high-end acoustic guitars such as the Richard Thompson signature model from Lowden. Similarly, drums are made from C. abyssinica, C. millenii, and C. platythyrsa due to the resonance of the wood.

=== Smoking ===
Cordia leaves can be dried and used to smoke cannabis with.

== Gallery ==
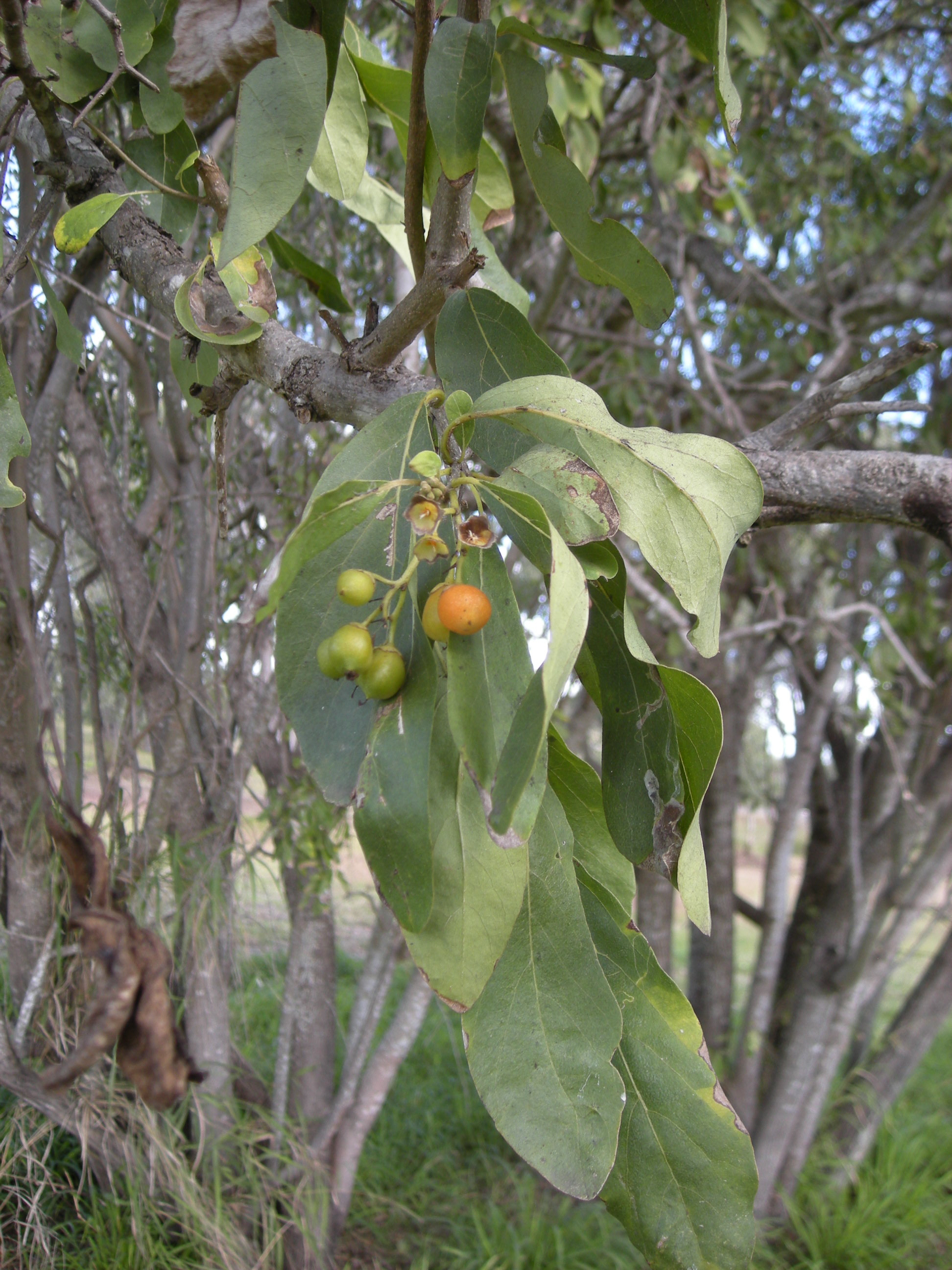
C. sinensis foliage and fruit.

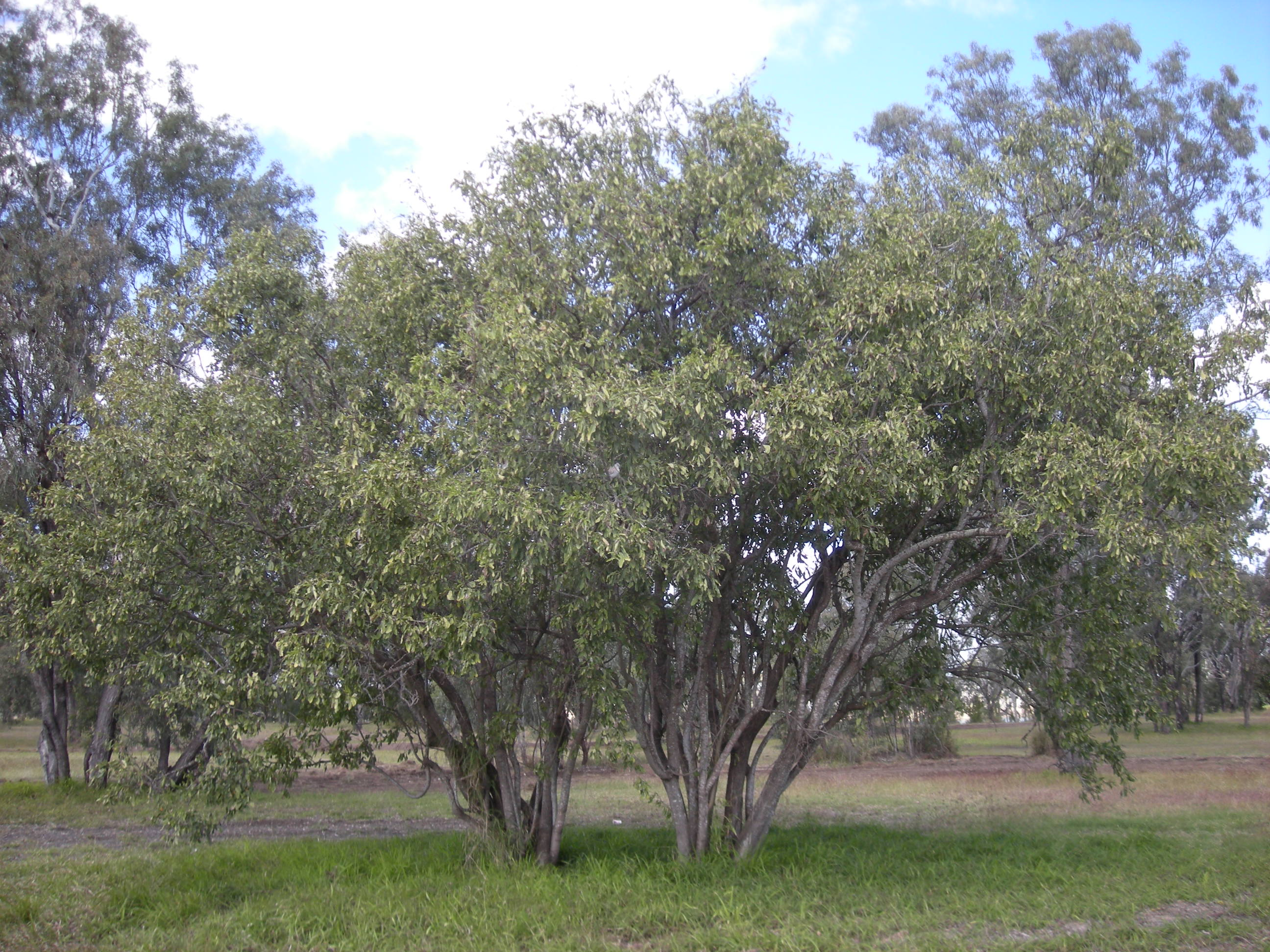
C. sinensis trees.

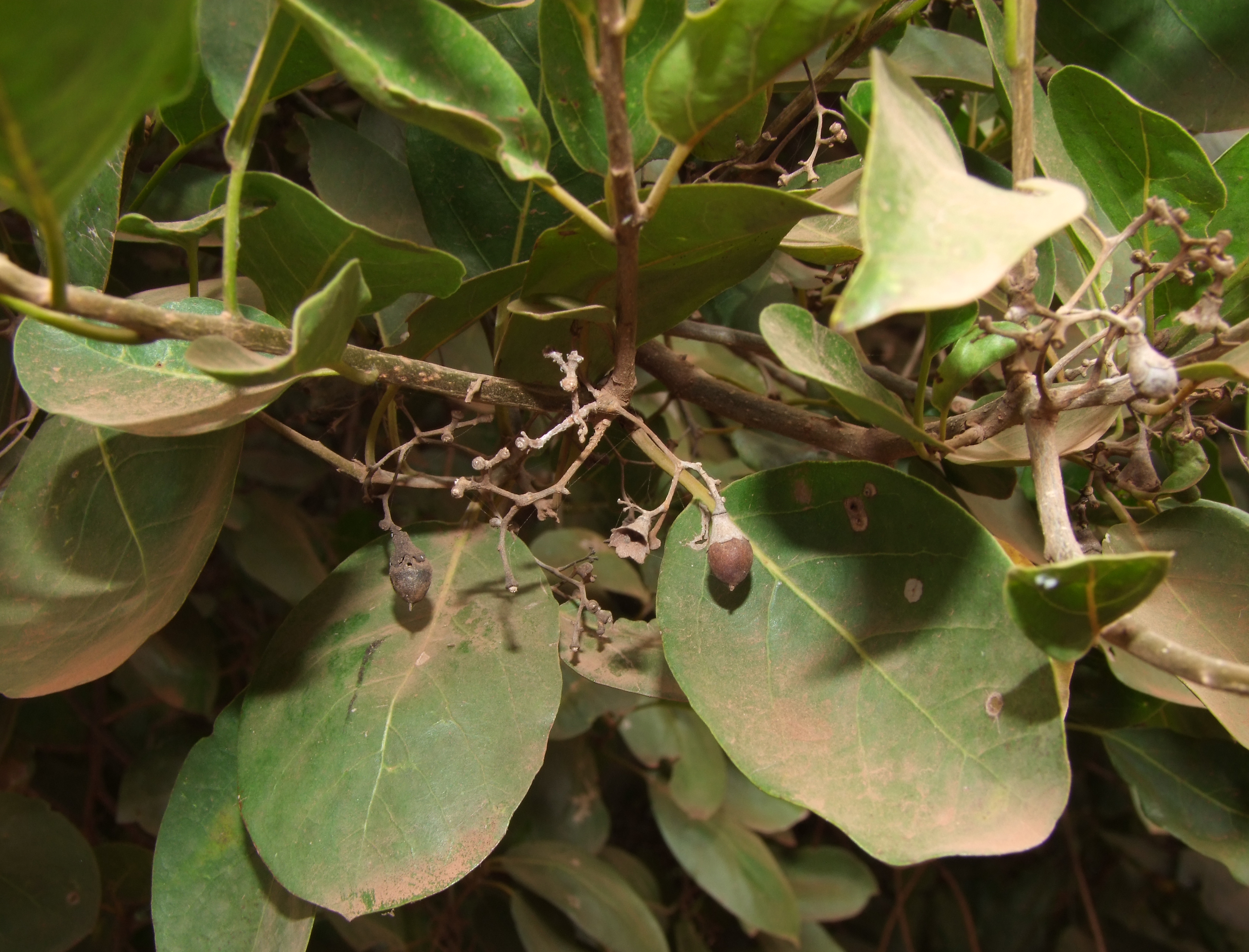
Fruits of Cordia goetzei
