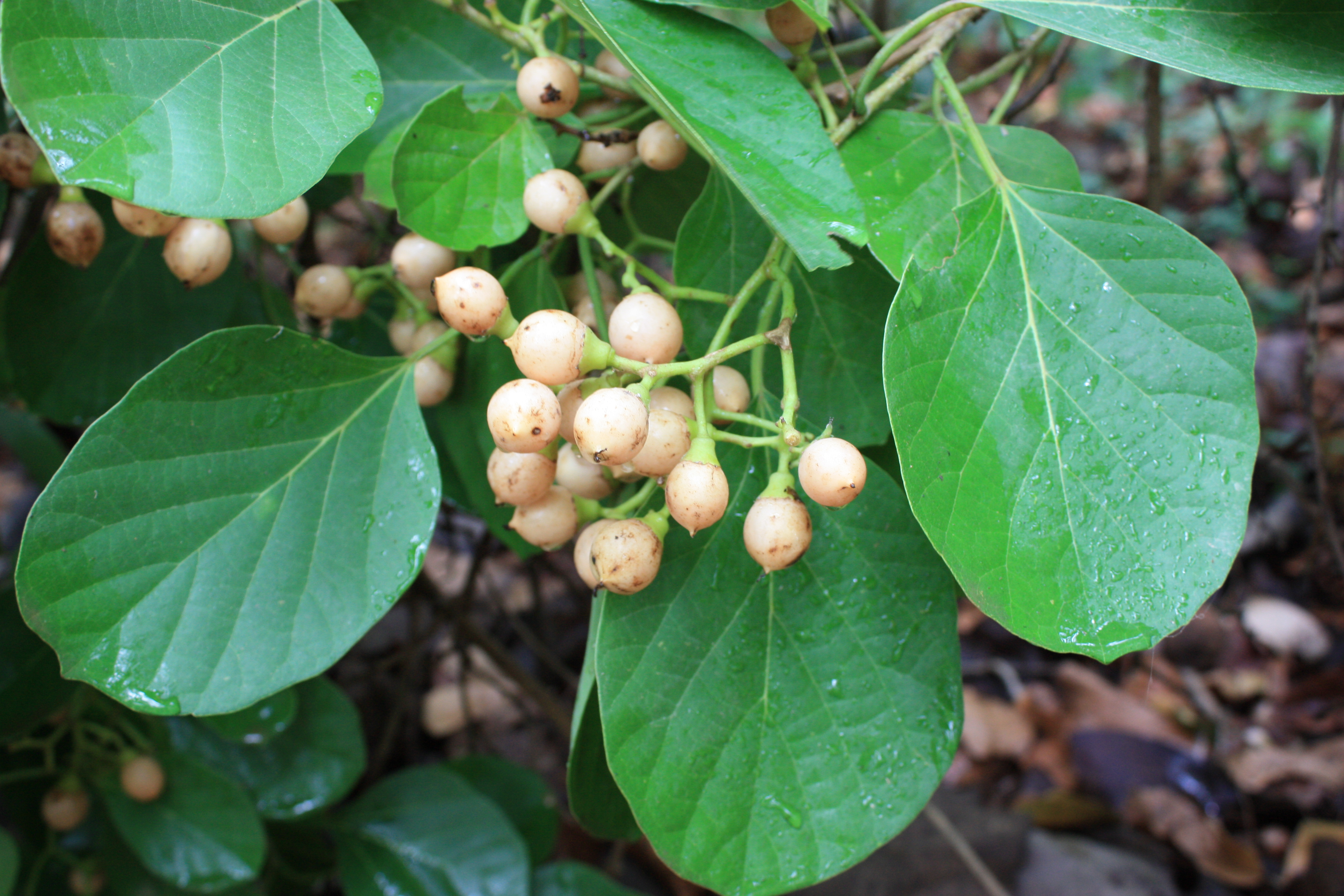

Conservation status
- Least Concern (IUCN 3.1)

Scientific classification
- Kingdom: Plantae
- Clade: Embryophytes
- Clade: Tracheophytes
- Clade: Angiosperms
- Clade: Eudicots
- Clade: Asterids
- Order: Boraginales
- Family: Cordiaceae
- Genus: Cordia
- Species: C. myxa

Binomial name
- Cordia myxa L.

Synonyms
- Cordia obliqua Cordia domestica

= Cordia myxa =

Assyrian plum

Species of tree

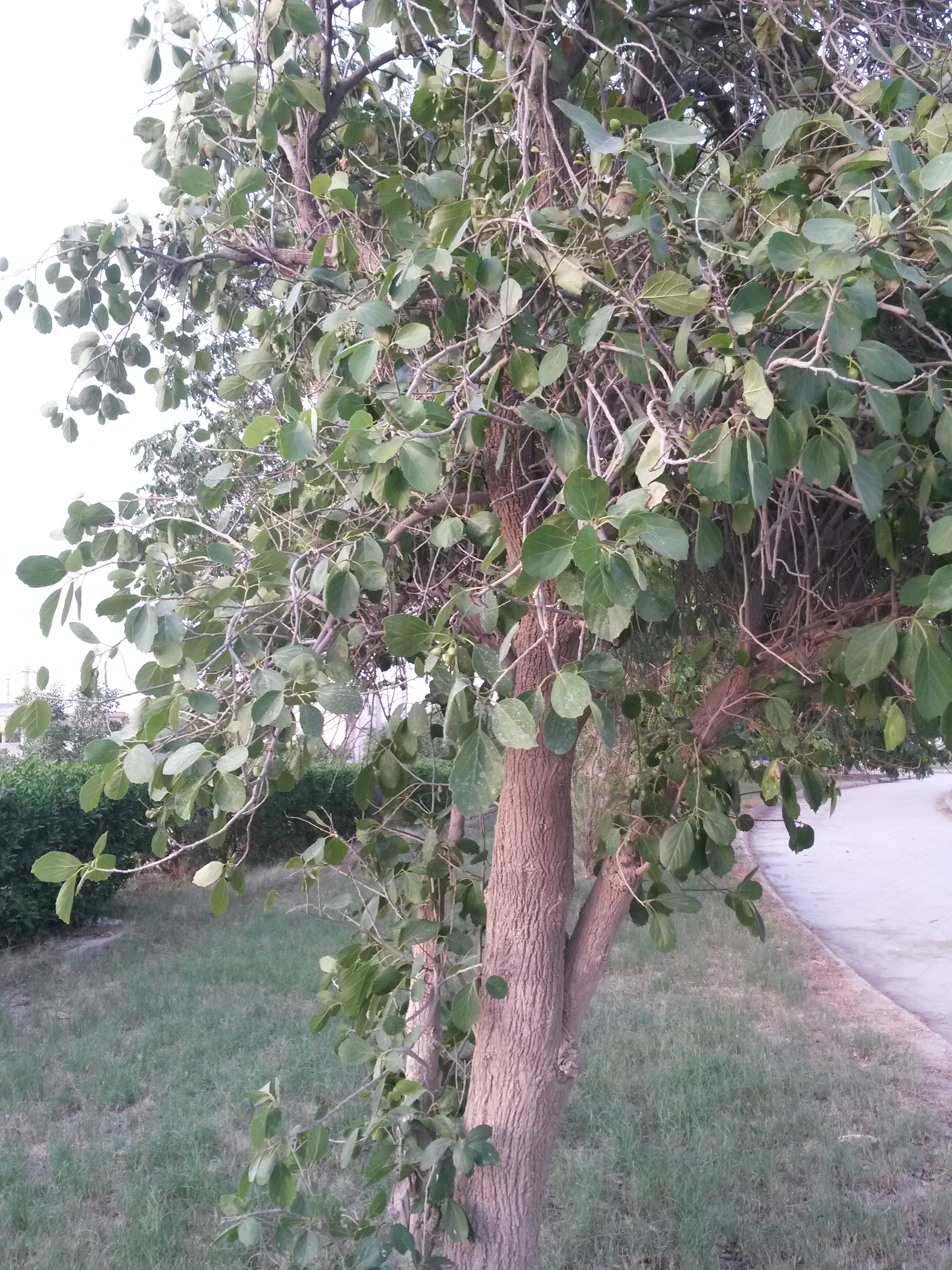
Growing in Ab Pakhsh

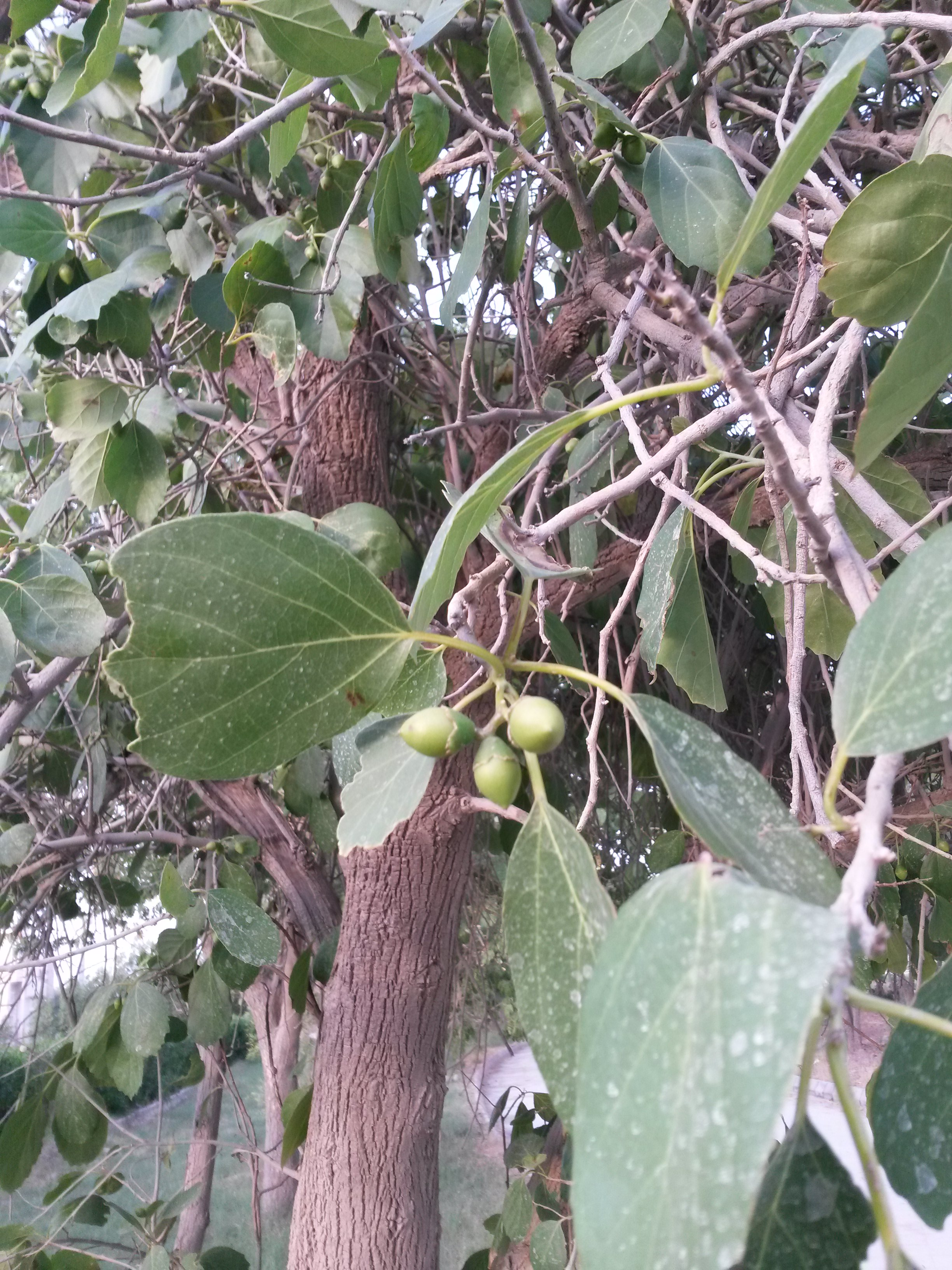
Unripe in Ab Pakhsh

Cordia myxa, also called sebesten plum, Assyrian plum, Indian cherry, glue berry, lasura, or bambar is a mid-sized, deciduous tree in the family Cordiaceae, native to Asia. It produces small, edible fruit and is found in warmer areas across Africa and Asia.

It is found growing primarily in Asia, as well as, across the globe especially in tropical regions having the right type of geophysical environment. It is seen coming up naturally and growing abundantly from Myanmar in the east to Lebanon and Syria in the west. Its habitat starts at about 200 metres (660 ft) above mean sea level in the plains and ascends to an altitude around 1,500 metres (4,920 ft) in the hills.

== Habit ==
Assyrian plum matures in about 50 to 60 years by when its girth at the breast height is about 1 to 1.5 metres (3 ft 3 in to 4 ft 11 in). Its bole (main trunk) is generally straight and cylindrical, attaining a height of nearly 3 to 4 metres (9.8 to 13.1 ft). The branches spread in all directions by virtue of which its crown can be trained into a beautiful inverted dome like an umbrella. When fully grown up, the total height of the tree comes to nearly 10 to 15 metres (33 to 49 ft). In less favorable climates and/or unfavorable environments, however, it has a lesser growth and may attain a somewhat crooked form. In still worse environments it can even remain a stunted shrub.

== Bark ==
The bark of Assyrian plum is grayish brown in color with longitudinal and vertical fissures. The tree can be easily identified from a distance by observing the fissures which are so prominent in the bark of the main bole of a tree approaching maturity.

== Leaves ==
The leaves of Assyrian plum are broad, ovate, alternate and stalked with the spread being 7 to 15 centimetres (2.8 to 5.9 in) × 5 to 10 centimetres (2.0 to 3.9 in). In matter of external appearance these are glabrous above and pubescent below. The young leaves tend to be hairy. The fresh foliage is quite useful as fodder for cattle — more so during grass famines. These are also used for wrapping biddies and cheroots.

== Flowers ==
Assyrian plum flowers during March–April. The inflorescence, mostly terminal, is, white in color. Individual florets are nearly 5 millimetres (0.20 in) in diameter. At places these are somewhat hairy and white. Being a deciduous plant, the species bears male and female flowers on the same tree. The calyx part of an independent flower is about 8 millimetres (0.31 in) long and glabrous, but not pubescent. It splits irregularly at the opening of its bud into flower. The filaments are hairy.

== Fruit ==
The fruit of Assyrian plum starts appearing during July–August. It is a kind of a drupe (stone fruit), light pale to brown or even pink in color. The appearance tends to darken when ripening sets in. Being full of viscid glue-like mucilage, the pulp is somewhat translucent. When fully ripe the pulp becomes quite sweet in taste and is fully enjoyed by children. The sticky mucilage of a half ripe fruit can even be used as an alternative to paper glue in office work, and has traditionally been used as birdlime for trapping birds. The fruit pulp has also been used in traditional medicine as a demulcent and expectorant, particularly for coughs, sore throats and other respiratory complaints.

== Cultivation ==
Keeping in view the numerous utilities of the plant it is widely cultivated in the arid zone too. The species is indigenous to China and is widely cultivated in lower plains and tropical regions. Though this plant flourishes well in deep clay loam and sandy soils, it does still better in areas experiencing nearly 100 to 150 centimetres (39 to 59 in) of annual rainfall.
