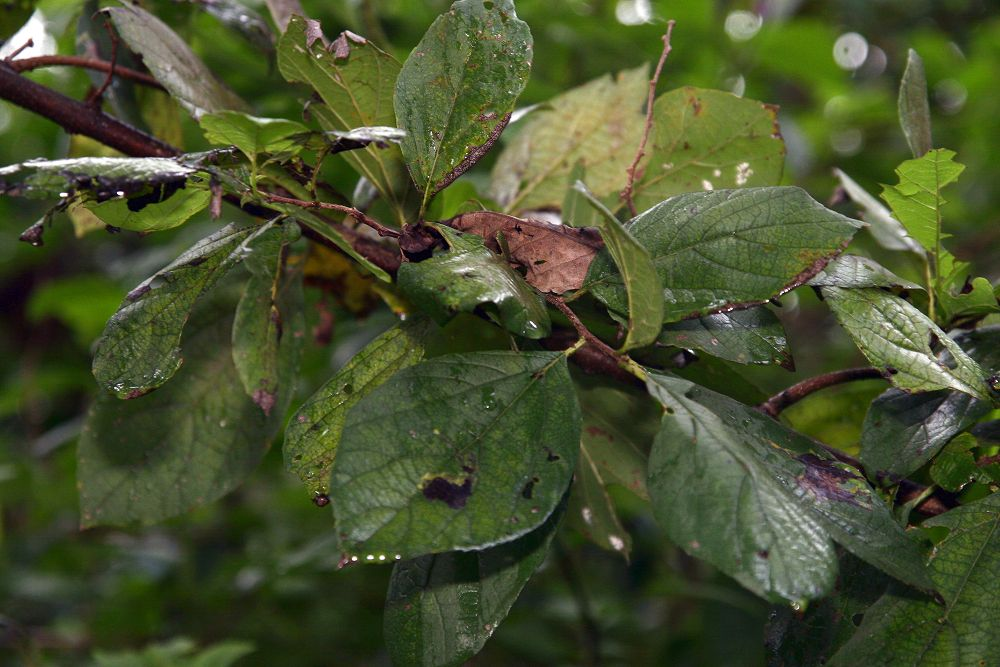
- Close up view of leaves

Conservation status
- Least Concern (IUCN 3.1)

Scientific classification
- Kingdom: Plantae
- Clade: Tracheophytes
- Clade: Angiosperms
- Clade: Eudicots
- Clade: Asterids
- Order: Boraginales
- Family: Cordiaceae
- Genus: Cordia
- Species: C. dentata

Binomial name
- Cordia dentata Poir.

= Cordia dentata =

Species of flowering plant

Cordia dentata, commonly known as white manjack, is a species of flowering plant in the family Cordiaceae. It is native to the southern United States, Mexico, Central America, Colombia and Venezuela. In the Caribbean, it is found in Jamaica, Cuba, Virgin Islands and Puerto Rico. It is also found in Madagascar.
