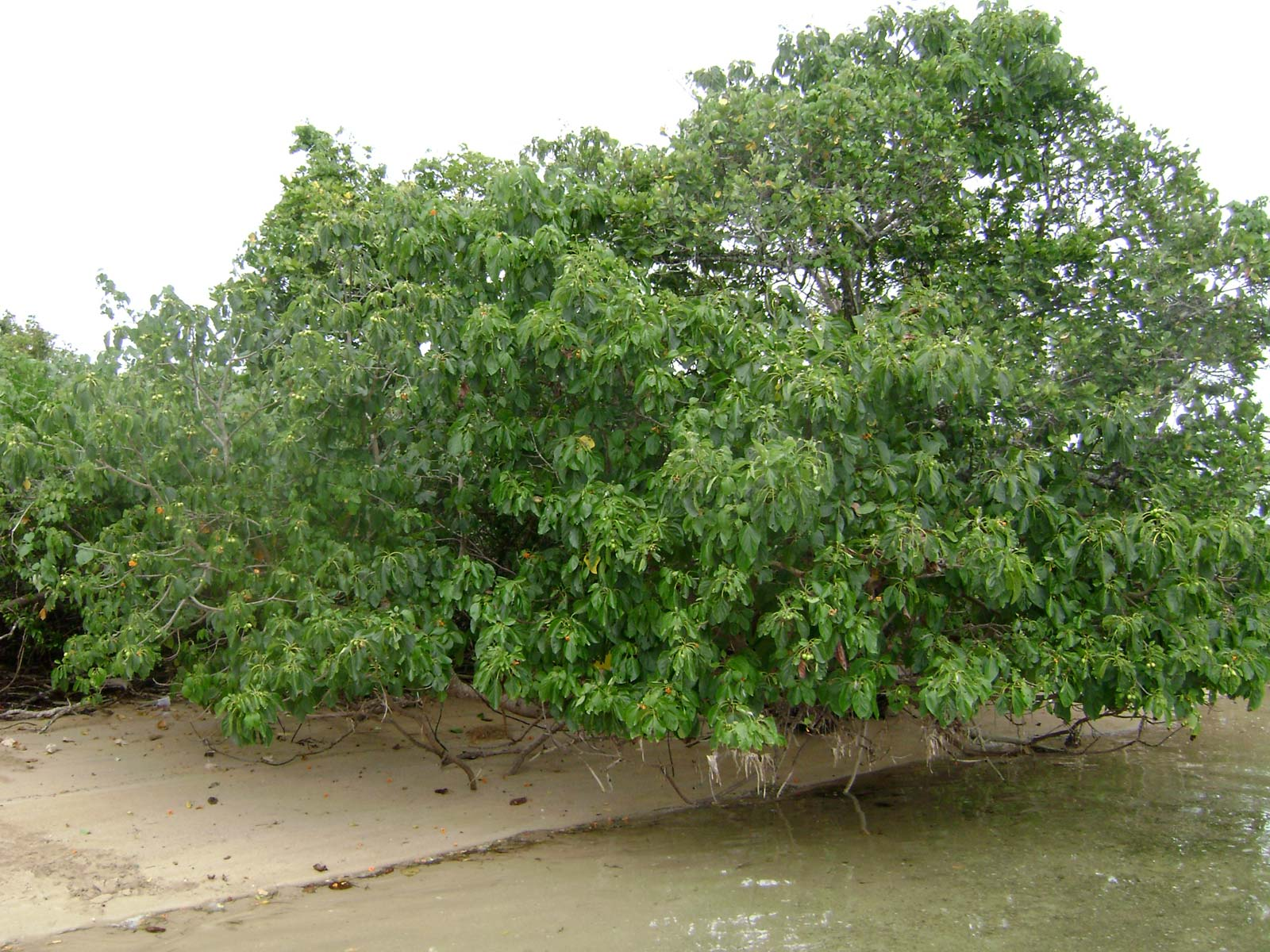
- Cordia subcordata

Scientific classification
- Kingdom: Plantae
- Clade: Tracheophytes
- Clade: Angiosperms
- Clade: Eudicots
- Clade: Asterids
- Order: Boraginales
- Family: Cordiaceae

Genera
- See text.

= Cordiaceae =

Subfamily of flowering plants

Cordiaceae is a family in the flowering plant order Boraginales. It has also been treated as the subfamily Cordioideae of a broadly circumscribed family Boraginaceae s.l., but in 2016 the Boraginales Working Group recommended treating it as the separate family Cordiaceae. This treatment is accepted by World Flora Online as of December 2025, but not by Plants of the World Online which places its genera in Boraginaceae.

== Genera ==
As of December 2025, World Flora Online accepted two genera:

- Cordia L.
- Varronia P.Browne
