= Coffee berry =

Coffee berry may refer to:

- Coffee cherry, the fruit of coffee plants
- Coprosma hirtella, or coffee-berry, a plant in the Rubiaceae family, native to south-eastern Australia
- Frangula californica, or California coffeeberry, a plant in the buckthorn family, native to western North America
- Frangula rubra, or Sierra coffeeberry, another plant in the buckthorn family, native to the mountains of California
- Simmondsia chinensis, also known as coffeeberry or jojoba, native to the deserts of western North America
Plants named coffee berry
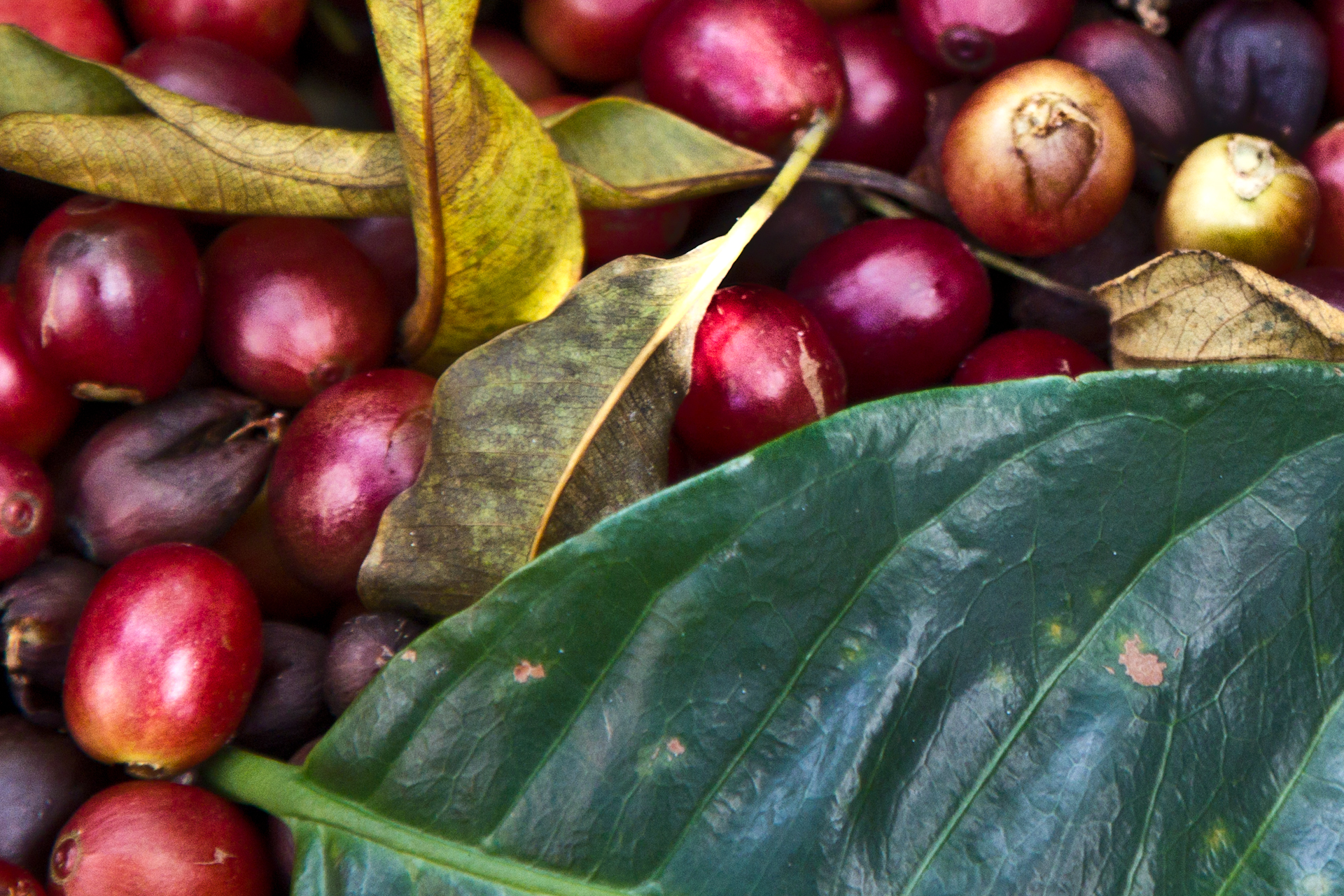
Coffee cherries

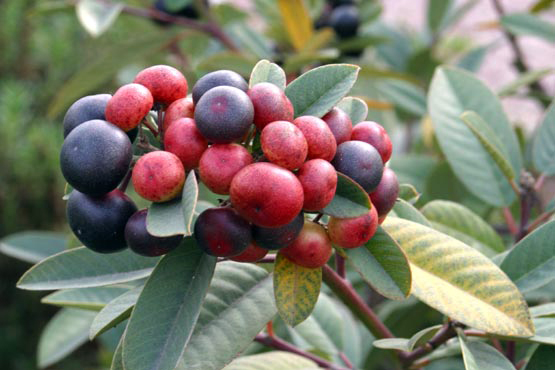
Frangula californica fruits

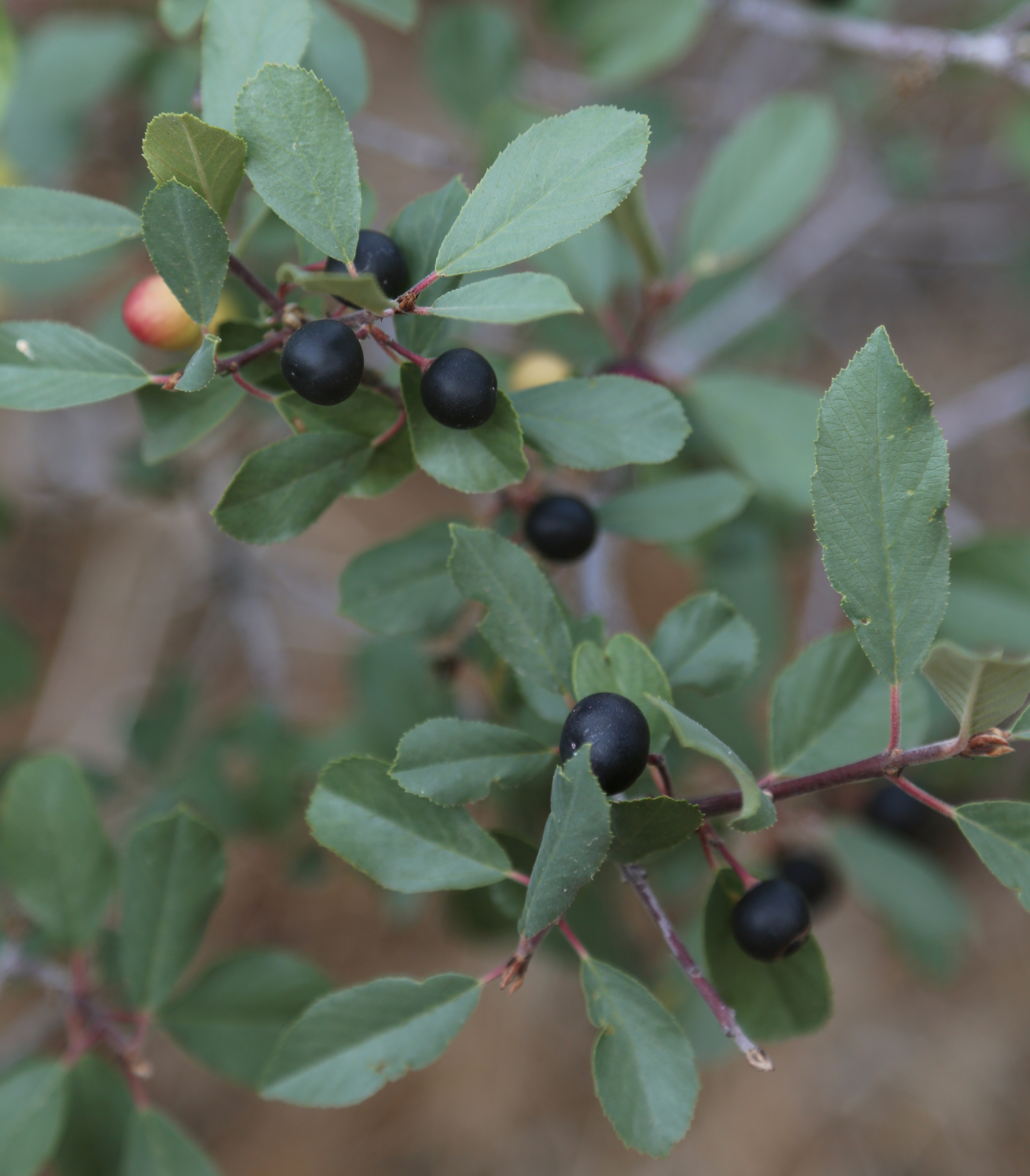
Frangula rubra fruits

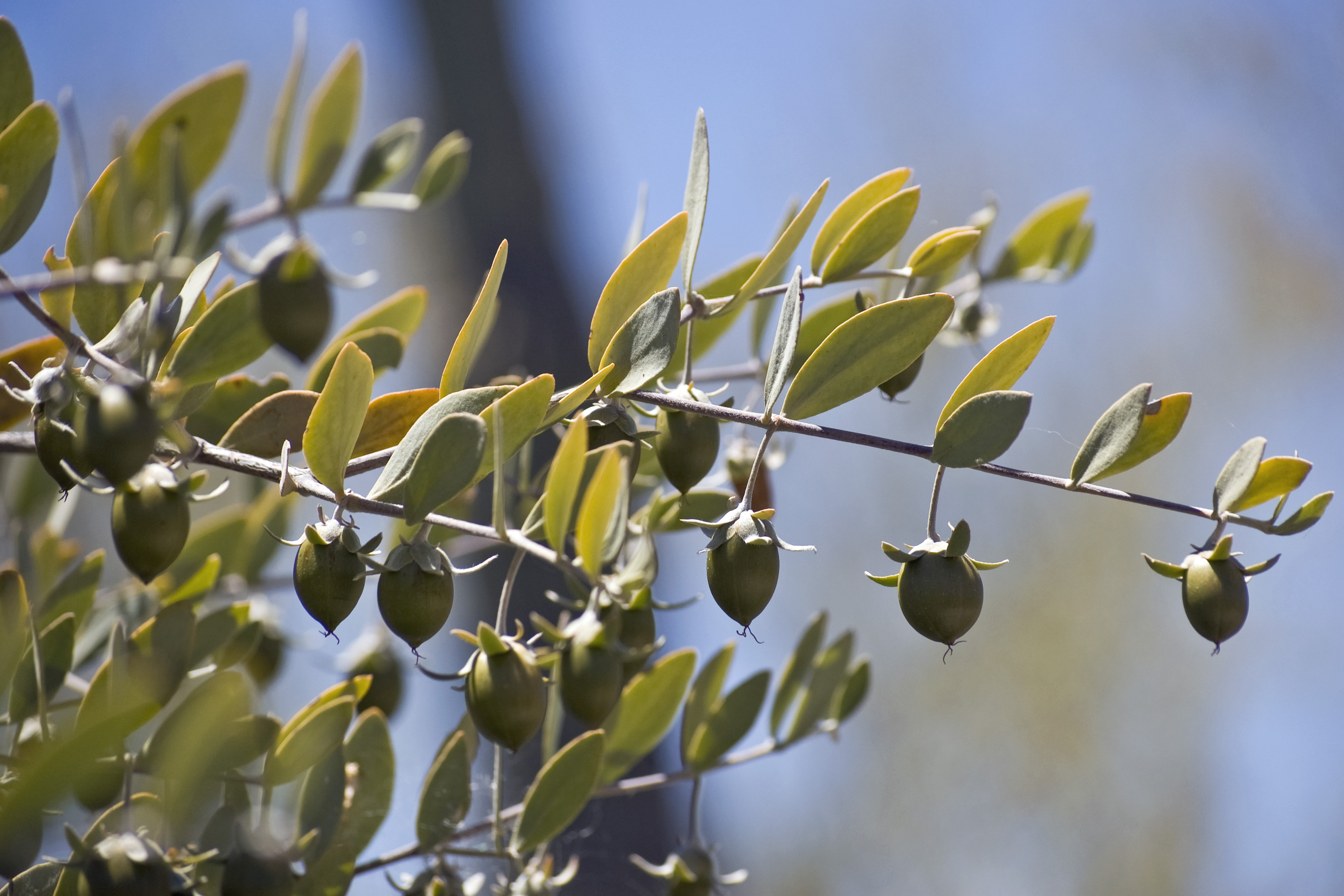
Jojoba fruits
