= Sorhagenia lophyrella =

Scientific classification
- Domain: Eukaryota
- Kingdom: Animalia
- Phylum: Arthropoda
- Class: Insecta
- Order: Lepidoptera
- Family: Cosmopterigidae
- Genus: Sorhagenia
- Species: S. lophyrella

Binomial name
- Sorhagenia lophyrella (Douglas, 1846)

Synonyms
- Anacampsis lophyrella Douglas, 1846; Sorhagenia tolli Riedl, 1962

Species of moth

Sorhagenia lophyrella is a moth in the family Cosmopterigidae. It is found in most of Europe, Asia Minor and the Caucasus.

The wingspan is about 8 to 11 millimetres (0.3 to 0.4 in). Sorhagenia lophyrella resembles Sorhagenia rhamniella, but is distinguished by the slightly lighter front wings and the pale grey rear wings. images A certain distinction is only possible from genitalic examination.

Adults are on wing from in July in one generation per year.

The larvae feed on Rhamnus cathartica, Frangula alnus, Rhamnus pumila, Rhamnus saxatalis and sometimes also Rhamnus alpina and Rhamnus alaternus. Larvae can be found from the beginning of April to the end of May.
