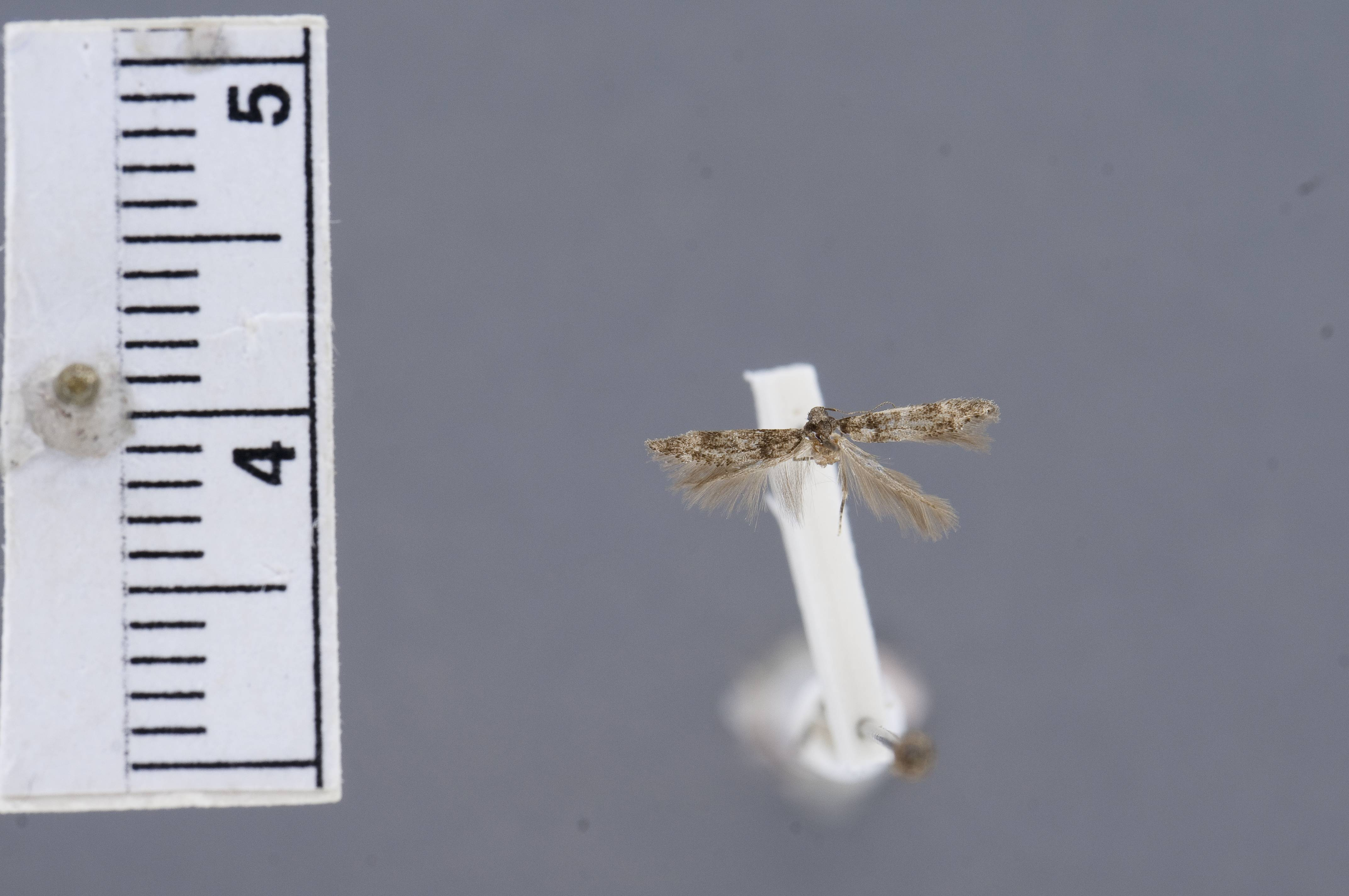
- Preserved holotype

Scientific classification
- Domain: Eukaryota
- Kingdom: Animalia
- Phylum: Arthropoda
- Class: Insecta
- Order: Lepidoptera
- Family: Cosmopterigidae
- Genus: Sorhagenia
- Species: S. cracens

Binomial name
- Sorhagenia cracens Hodges, 1978

= Sorhagenia cracens =

Species of moth

Sorhagenia cracens is a moth in the family Cosmopterigidae. It was described by Ronald W. Hodges in 1978. It is found in North America, where it has been recorded from Idaho.

Sorhagenia daedala and Sorhagenia nimbosus are closely related species. S. cracens can be differentiated from S. daedala because the eighth sternum in S. cracens is longer than it is wide, and from S. nimbosa (which also has a long eighth sternum) because S. cracens has a medial lobe of the vinculum that is longer than it is wide.
