= F. rubra =

F. rubra may refer to:

- Festuca rubra, the red fescue, a grass species found worldwide
- Filipendula rubra, the queen-of-the-prairie, a medicinal and ornamental plant species native to the United States
- Foudia rubra, the Mauritius fody, a bird species endemic to the island of Mauritius

== Synonyms ==
- Frangula rubra, a synonym for Rhamnus rubra, the red buckthorn, a flowering plant species
