= Indian cherry =

Indian cherry is a common name for several plants and may refer to:

- Amelanchier canadensis
- Cordia dichotoma
- Rhamnus caroliniana
