= Cherylanne DeVita =

American businesswoman (born 1957)

- Born: December 6, 1957 (age 68); New York City, U.S.
- Education: Arizona State University

Cherylanne DeVita (born December 6, 1957, in New York City) is an American businesswoman in natural skin care industry, national lecturer and media personality. She is the founder and CEO of DeVita Natural Skin Care and Color Cosmetics (DeVita International, Inc.)

== Early life and education ==
Cherylanne DeVita was born in New York, in an Italian immigrant family. Her entire life her skin had suffered from chronic cystic acne, and then when 40s hit, so did the ravages of the Arizona sun she had lived in all her adult life. She studied psychology and chemistry at Arizona State University.

== Career ==
In 1998 she established a skin care company known as DeVita International, Inc. Natural Skin Care and Color Cosmetics was incorporated as DeVita International, Inc. in 1998 in the state of Arizona as an Arizona S Corporation. DeVita International, Inc. is a global skin care firm headquartered in Phoenix, Arizona. The company offers over 100 different vegan certified skin care products and available at over 1500 natural retail stores and online throughout the United States and around the world.

In 2012 DeVita's company, DeVita International, Inc. was named one of Inc. 5000 America’s fastest growing companies for 2012.

In 2013, DeVita launched Absolute Minerals makeup line have participated in first ever fully vegan fashion show in cooperation with independent vegan Fashion House Vaute Couture by Leanne Mai-ly Hilgart in Fall 2013 Fashion Week at Eyebeam Studios, NY. In 2013 she also introduces a vegan skin care line for babies and toddlers.

== Recognition ==
- In 2013, April, SmartFem Magazine named Cherylanne "A Woman of the Month" for her effort in making sure people have safe and healthy skin care alternatives.
- In 2015, Cherylanne received 2015-2016 Woman Innovator Award from the Successful Women Owners Network (to be published by Successful Women Owner Network 2015 A Republic Media Program).
