= False buckthorn =

False buckthorn is a common name for several plants and may refer to:

- Frangula, a genus containing species formerly classified with the "true" buckthorns of the genus Rhamnus
- Sideroxylon lanuginosum, a species unrelated to the "true" buckthorns, native to the Southwestern United States
