= Skin care (disambiguation) =

Skin care is a range of practices that support skin integrity, enhance its appearance, and relieve skin conditions.

Skin care may also refer to

- Cosmetics, care substances used to enhance the appearance or odor of the human body
- Dermatology, a medical subspecialty
- Kangaroo care, or skin-to-skin care, a newborn care technique
- Natural skin care, the use of natural ingredients and traditional medicine in skin care
- Skincare (film), a 2024 thriller film
