= Pulpe de vie =

French organic cosmetics brand

Pulpe de Vie
- Company type: Privately held company
- Industry: Organic Cosmetics
- Founded: 2009 in France
- Founder: Julie Ducret
- Headquarters: Marseille, France
- Area served: Worldwide
- Products: Natural skin care
- Revenue: € 3 millions (2022)
- Website: pulpedevie.com/en/

Pulpe de Vie is a French organic cosmetics brand created in 2009.

== Background ==
Back in France in 2009 after a sabbatical year in South America, Julie Ducret, together with an investor partner, created Bio Provence within the Marseille Innovation business incubator.

In 2014, a 150,000 euros fundraising exercise was completed with various partners, including Bpifrance and Crédit Agricole.

After 2015, the company made a strategical change: initially listed in para pharmacies and organic stores, it switched to large-scale distribution, increasing production from 5,000 to 10,000 units.

In 2017, a second fundraising exercise of 400,000 euros was announced was announced.

In 2018, its export policy was suspended to refocus on the French market, in particular by developing marketing on social networks, for example, through partnering with influencers.

In 2021, the brand invested in the hard discount sector and resold 450 Lidl out of 1,006 stores in France.

In 2023, the company completed a new funding round of 1.7 million euros to start exporting and triple its growth by 2026.

== Production and marketing ==
With Ecocert and Cosmébio certified products, Pulpe de Vie, targets women aged twenty to thirty-five by focusing on the packaging and prices not exceeding twenty euros.

Inspired by the local purchasing approach, the company works with around twenty regional producers, collecting their "ugly" and unsold fruits as part of an effort to combat food waste, Purchases are made by a service provider based in Sisteron while the subcontracting laboratory is located in La Fare-les-Oliviers.
