= Pammene luedersiana =

Scientific classification
- Kingdom: Animalia
- Phylum: Arthropoda
- Clade: Pancrustacea
- Class: Insecta
- Order: Lepidoptera
- Family: Tortricidae
- Genus: Pammene
- Species: P. luedersiana

Binomial name
- Pammene luedersiana (Sorhagen, 1885)

Species of moth

Pammene luedersiana is a moth belonging to the family Tortricidae. The species was first described by Ludwig Friedrich Sorhagen in 1885.

It is native to Europe.
