= Sorhagenia baucidis =

Scientific classification
- Kingdom: Animalia
- Phylum: Arthropoda
- Clade: Pancrustacea
- Class: Insecta
- Order: Lepidoptera
- Family: Cosmopterigidae
- Genus: Sorhagenia
- Species: S. baucidis

Binomial name
- Sorhagenia baucidis Hodges, 1969

Species of moth

Sorhagenia baucidis is a moth in the family Cosmopterigidae. It was described by Ronald W. Hodges in 1969. It is found in North America, where it has been recorded from Illinois and Saskatchewan.

The wingspan is 10-10.5 mm. The forewings are pale gray from just beyond the base to one-half. There are a few dark gray scales at the base and some on the middle third near the costa. There are also five patches of raised scales and a row of three dark gray spots on the outer margin. The hindwings are gray. Adults have been recorded on wing from June to July.
