= Sorhagenia fibigeri =

Scientific classification
- Kingdom: Animalia
- Phylum: Arthropoda
- Clade: Pancrustacea
- Class: Insecta
- Order: Lepidoptera
- Family: Cosmopterigidae
- Genus: Sorhagenia
- Species: S. fibigeri

Binomial name
- Sorhagenia fibigeri Koster & Sinev, 2003

Species of moth

Sorhagenia fibigeri is a moth in the family Cosmopterigidae. It is found in Asia Minor.

The wingspan is 7–9 millimetres (0.28–0.35 in). Adults have been recorded from the beginning of July to mid July.
