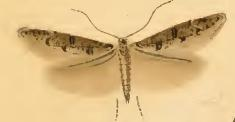

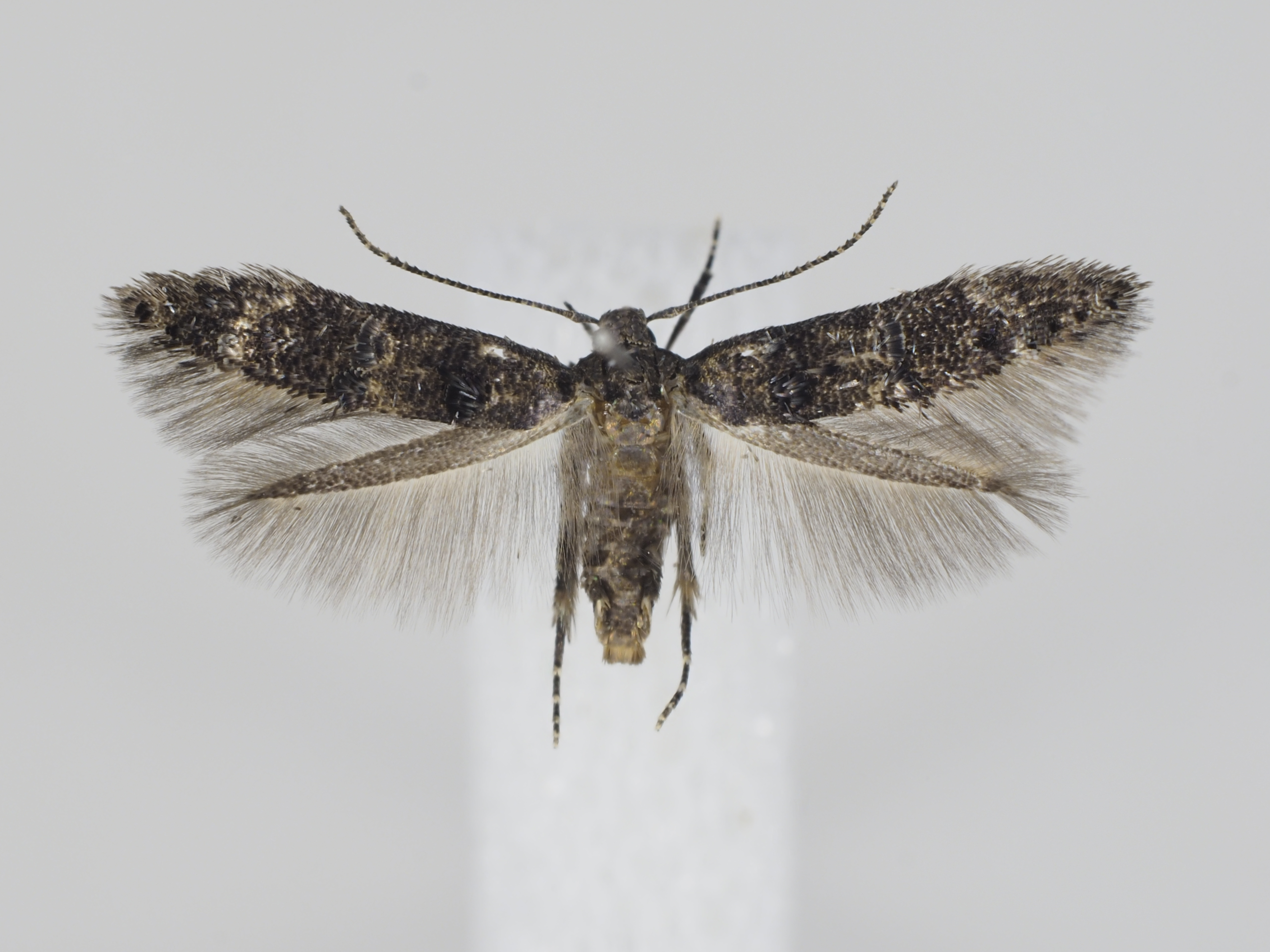

Scientific classification
- Kingdom: Animalia
- Phylum: Arthropoda
- Clade: Pancrustacea
- Class: Insecta
- Order: Lepidoptera
- Family: Cosmopterigidae
- Genus: Sorhagenia
- Species: S. rhamniella

Binomial name
- Sorhagenia rhamniella (Zeller, 1839)

Synonyms
- Elachista rhamniella Zeller, 1839; Anacampsis asperipunctella Bruand, 1851

= Sorhagenia rhamniella =

Species of moth

Sorhagenia rhamniella is a moth in the family Cosmopterigidae. It is found in most of Europe, except the Balkan Peninsula.

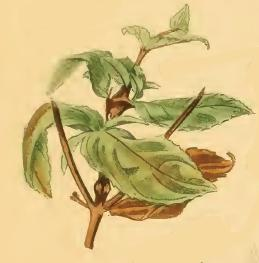
A shoot of buckthorn drooping from larval feeding

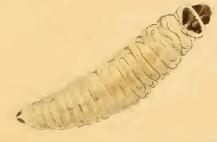
Larva

The wingspan is about 9–10 mm. The head is fuscous, whitish sprinkled. Forewings are fuscous, sometimes somewhat ochreous mixed; large blackish scale-tufts on fold at 1/4, on dorsum before tornus, below middle of costa, and in disc at 3/4; some raised black strigulae towards apex. Hindwings are grey. The larva is greenish; head and plate of 2 black.

Adults are on wing from July to August.

The larvae feed on Rhamnus frangula and Rhamnus cathartica. Sometimes, also young leaves are eaten. Larvae can be found from the beginning of May to June.
