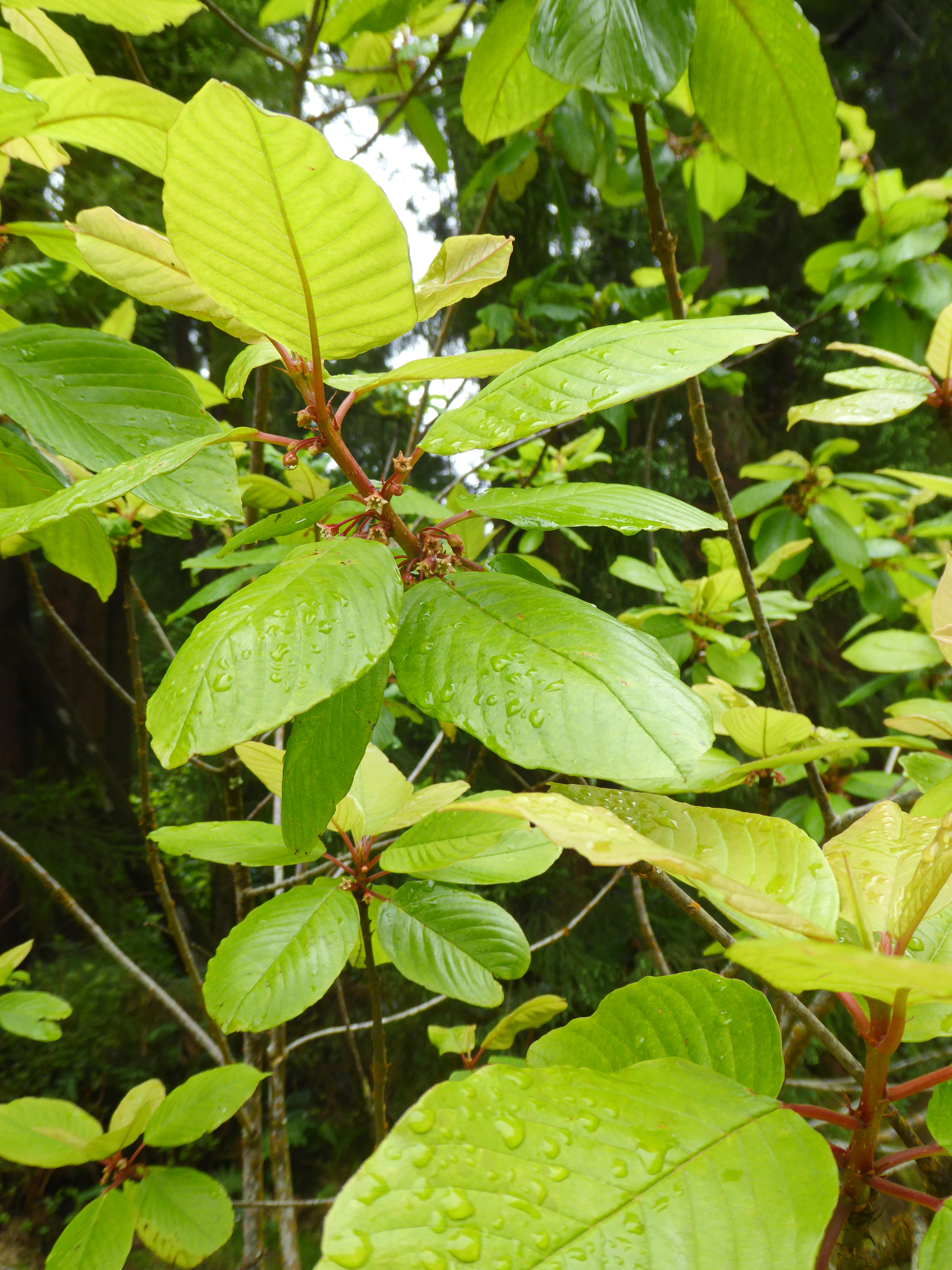

Conservation status
- Least Concern (IUCN 3.1)

Scientific classification
- Kingdom: Plantae
- Clade: Tracheophytes
- Clade: Angiosperms
- Clade: Eudicots
- Clade: Rosids
- Order: Rosales
- Family: Rhamnaceae
- Genus: Frangula
- Species: F. azorica

Binomial name
- Frangula azorica Grubov

Synonyms
- Rhamnus latifolia L'Hér.

= Frangula azorica =

Species of flowering plant

Frangula azorica is a tall semi-deciduous shrub or small tree in the family Rhamnaceae. It is endemic to the Azores, Portugal. Fossil evidence suggests this species was also native to Madeira but went extinct. It is threatened by habitat loss.
