= Sorhagenia griseella =

Scientific classification
- Kingdom: Animalia
- Phylum: Arthropoda
- Clade: Pancrustacea
- Class: Insecta
- Order: Lepidoptera
- Family: Cosmopterigidae
- Genus: Sorhagenia
- Species: S. griseella

Binomial name
- Sorhagenia griseella Sinev, 1993

Species of moth

Sorhagenia griseella is a moth in the family Cosmopterigidae. It was described by Sinev in 1993. It is found in Russia.
