= Sorhagenia reconditella =

Scientific classification
- Domain: Eukaryota
- Kingdom: Animalia
- Phylum: Arthropoda
- Class: Insecta
- Order: Lepidoptera
- Family: Cosmopterigidae
- Genus: Sorhagenia
- Species: S. reconditella

Binomial name
- Sorhagenia reconditella Riedl, 1983

Species of moth

Sorhagenia reconditella is a moth in the family Cosmopterigidae. It is found in Greece and on Cyprus.

The wingspan is about 8 mm. Adults have been recorded from mid-May to the beginning of June.
