= Sorhagenia pexa =

Scientific classification
- Kingdom: Animalia
- Phylum: Arthropoda
- Clade: Pancrustacea
- Class: Insecta
- Order: Lepidoptera
- Family: Cosmopterigidae
- Genus: Sorhagenia
- Species: S. pexa

Binomial name
- Sorhagenia pexa Hodges, 1969

Species of moth

Sorhagenia pexa is a moth in the family Cosmopterigidae. It was described by Ronald W. Hodges in 1969. It is found in North America, where it has been recorded from Texas, Arkansas and Illinois.

The wingspan is 12–14 mm. There are four patches of raised scales on the forewings. The base of the wing and several streaks on the costal half are brownish black and there is an oblique pale orange band from the costa to the tornus. Beyond this, a series of five brown-black dots is found on the costal margin and two on the outer margin. The hindwings are gray. Adults have been recorded on wing from June to July.
