= Sorhagenia dahurica =

Scientific classification
- Kingdom: Animalia
- Phylum: Arthropoda
- Clade: Pancrustacea
- Class: Insecta
- Order: Lepidoptera
- Family: Cosmopterigidae
- Genus: Sorhagenia
- Species: S. dahurica

Binomial name
- Sorhagenia dahurica Sinev, 1986

Species of insect

Sorhagenia dahurica is a moth in the family Cosmopterigidae. It was described by Sinev in 1986. It is found in Russia.
