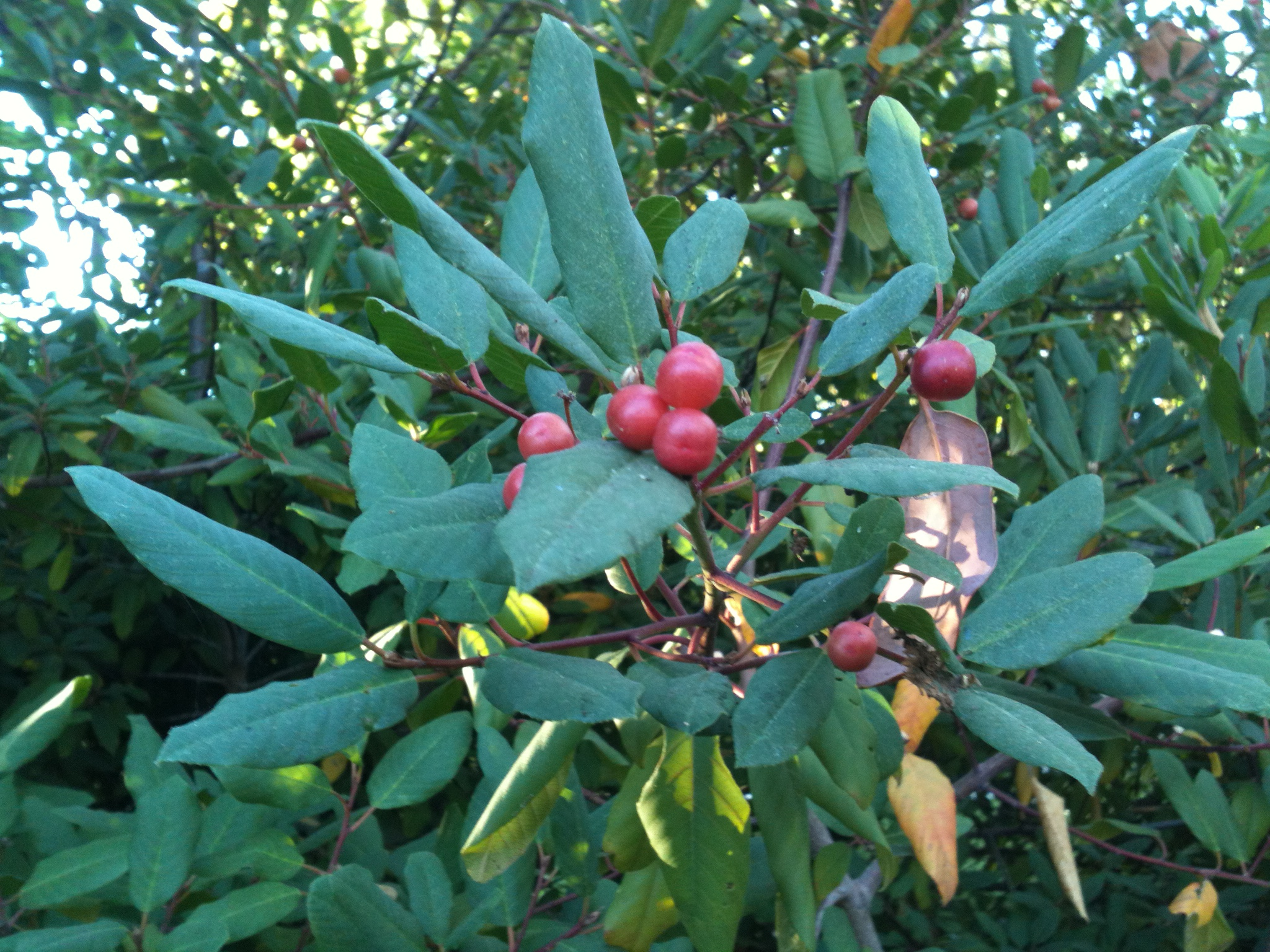

Conservation status
- Least Concern (IUCN 3.1)

- Secure (NatureServe)

Scientific classification
- Kingdom: Plantae
- Clade: Tracheophytes
- Clade: Angiosperms
- Clade: Eudicots
- Clade: Rosids
- Order: Rosales
- Family: Rhamnaceae
- Genus: Frangula
- Species: F. californica

Binomial name
- Frangula californica (Eschsch.) A.Gray
- Frangula californica range, estimated with the iNaturalist Geomodel, 2025

Synonyms
- Rhamnus californica Eschsch.

= Frangula californica =

California coffeeberry

Species of tree

Frangula californica (previously classified as Rhamnus californica) is a species of flowering plant in the buckthorn family native to western North America. It produces edible fruits and seeds. It is commonly known as California coffeeberry and California buckthorn.

== Description ==
Frangula californica is a shrub 0.9–3.7 metres (3–12 ft) tall. It is variable in form across subspecies. In favorable conditions the plant can develop into a small tree over 3.7 m (12 ft) tall. More commonly it is a shrub between 0.9–1.8 m (3–6 ft) tall.

The branches may have a reddish tinge and the new twigs are often red in color. The alternately arranged leaves are evergreen and glabrous or smooth without hair above; there is normally a waxy-white undercoating on the bottom. The blades are an ovate to elliptic shape, thin in moist habitat, and smaller and thicker in dry areas. The leaves are fully developed around May.

=== Inflorescence and fruit ===
Blooming only in May and June, the greenish-yellow flowers are 0.4 centimetres (1/8 in) wide and occur in leaf axil clusters, with 5 sepals and 5 shorter petals.

The fruit is a juicy drupe about 7–9 millimetres (1/4–3/8 in) in diameter, normally forming in pairs or clusters. The fruit may be green, red, or black depending on ripeness. Berries fully ripen in early fall, but can be challenging to collect due to birds who use the fruit as a resource. Ripening occurs mainly from July to November. The berry contains two seeds resembling coffee beans. The seeds have poor resistance to fire and are short lived. The viability or lifespan of the seeds lasts to a maximum of 9 months. Seeds normally germinate in average temperature, not being too hot or cold and under favorable moisture conditions.

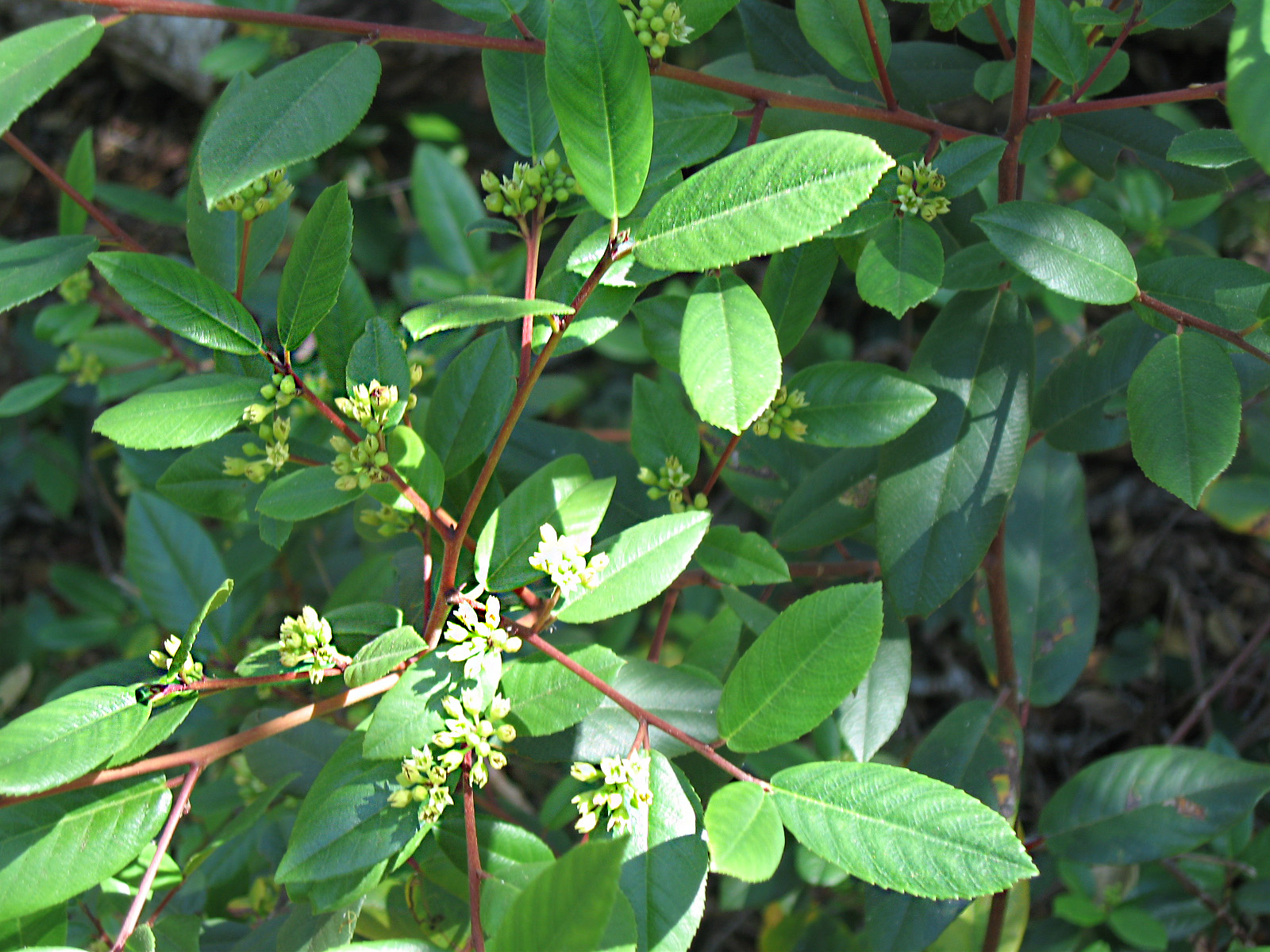
Frangula californica subsp. californica in flower

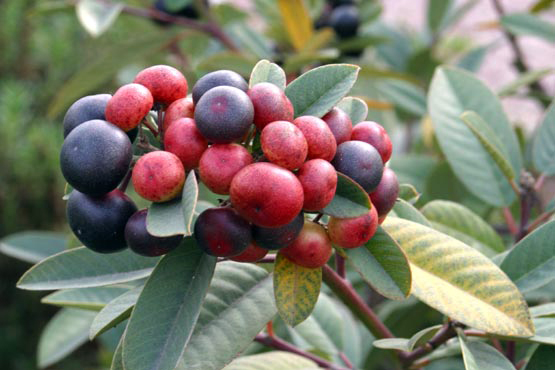
Ripening fruit

== Subspecies ==
Subspecies of Frangula californica include:

- Frangula californica subsp. californica — California coffeeberry; widespread in western California. Fruit with two seeds; twigs red; leaves with conspicuous veins.
- Frangula californica subsp. crassifolia — serpentine hoary coffeeberry; endemic to the Inner North California Coast Ranges, on serpentine soils.
- Frangula californica subsp. cuspidata — Sierra hoary coffeeberry; Southern Sierras, Transverse Ranges, Peninsular Ranges.
- Frangula californica subsp. occidentalis — Western California coffeeberry; on serpentine soils in northern California and southwestern Oregon, in the Klamath Mountains and North California Coast Ranges. Fruit with three seeds; twigs brown; leaves with inconspicuous veins.
- Frangula californica subsp. tomentella — hoary coffeeberry.
- Frangula californica subsp. ursina — desert hoary coffeeberry; endemic to the San Bernardino Mountains and Mojave Desert sky islands.

== Distribution and habitat ==
The plant is native to California, the Southwestern United States, and Baja California state in Mexico. It is an introduced species in Hawaii. The highest populations of this plant are mainly found in Arizona and California, but can also be found in New Mexico, Oregon, and Nevada as well.

It occurs in oak woodland and chaparral habitats, and numerous others in its range. Individual plants can live an estimated 100 to 200 years. An abundance or dominance of this plant usually shows an imbalance in soil quality, due to it commonly being found in rich, fertile soils. Frangula californica can be found in forests mixed with redwood, evergreen, and red fir. This plant is also a common shrub found in the environment in the Siskiyou Mountains, southwestern Oregon, and northern California within the forests.

== Ecology ==
This shrub is a member of many plant communities and grows in many types of habitat, including California chaparral and woodlands, coastal sage scrub, and California oak woodlands. It grows in forest types such as foggy coastal oak woodlands, Coast redwood forests, California mixed evergreen forests, and mountain coniferous forests.

It can be found alongside chaparral whitethorn (Ceanothus leucodermis), toyon (Heteromeles arbutifolia), skunkbush (Rhus trilobata), redberry (Rhamnus crocea), and western poison oak (Toxicodendron diversilobum). In brushy mountain habitat it grows among many species of manzanita.

The plant reproduces sexually by seed and vegetatively by sprouting. After wildfire or cutting, the plant generally resprouts from its root crown. Reproduction via seed is most common in mature stands of the plant. It produces seeds by 2 or 3 years of age. Seeds are mature in the fall. Seed dispersal is often performed by birds, which are attracted to the fruit; some plants are so stripped of fruit by birds that hardly any seeds fall below the parent plant.

This long-lived plant is persistent and becomes a dominant species in many habitat types, such as coastal woodlands. In the absence of wildfire, the shrub can grow large, with a wide spread that can shade out other flora. When fire occurs, the plant can be very damaged, but it readily resprouts from the surviving root crown, which is covered in buds for the purpose. It reaches its pre-burn size relatively quickly.

Parts of the plant, including the foliage and fruit, are food for wild animals such as mule deer, black bears, woodrats and many resident and migrating birds, as well as livestock. Many cattle, goats, and sheep consider the berry of this plant to be a palatable food source, but is only heavily utilized where the annual growth of this plant is abundant.

Two insects induce galls on California coffeeberry: a moth, Sorhagenia nimbosus, induces swelling along the leaf midrib, and a midge of the genus Asphondylia induces flower-bud galls. The flower is an attractor for native bees and supports pollination in areas with a high quantity of coffeeberry.

== Cultivation ==
This plant is cultivated as an ornamental plant by plant nurseries, for planting in native plant, water conserving, and wildlife gardens; in large pots and containers; and in natural landscaping and habitat restoration projects.

It is also used for erosion control, and is usually deer resistant. Erosion control usually occurs with this plant on dry steep hillsides where the roots keep in place and protect the surrounding land from weather erosion. Due to this plant being unpalatable to deer, it is commonly used for ornamental purposes, including landscape decor. This plant is also drought-tolerant and not difficult to maintain, due to it being easy to prune and shape. As a pollinator plant it is of special value to native butterflies and bees. Regeneration normally occurs quickly after fire and show constant vegetative regeneration, except when in extreme or abnormal conditions.

=== Cultivars ===
Cultivars of the species, for use as an ornamental plant, include:

- Frangula (Rhamnus) californica 'Eve Case' — Eve Case coffeeberry; smaller and more compact (3-6' H x 3-4' W), with denser foliage and larger berries than other species. Introduced by the Saratoga Horticultural Foundation in 1975.
- Frangula (Rhamnus) californica 'Leatherleaf' — Leatherleaf coffeeberry; with black-green foliage.
- Frangula (Rhamnus) californica 'Mount San Bruno' — smaller leaves, more dense and compact, particularly tolerant of garden conditions.
- Frangula (Rhamnus) californica 'Seaview' — a ground cover variety.
- Frangula (Rhamnus) californica ssp. tomentella 'Hoary' — covered with leaves, velvety smooth, blooms from January through April.
- Frangula (Rhamnus) californica "Bonita Linda"— gray-green leaves with reddish wood, prefers shade
- Frangula (Rhamnus) californica "Mound San Bruno"— compact vertically, but wide horizontally
- Frangula (Rhamnus) californica "Little Sur"— small and compact both in height and width, produces dark green leaves

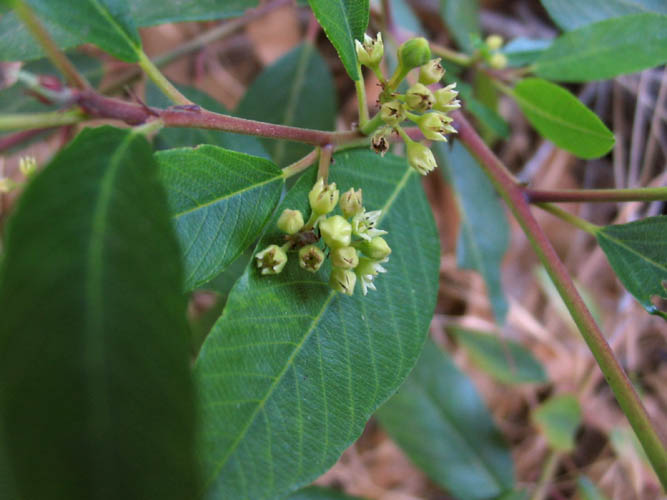
Close-up of flower

== Other uses ==
The berries are edible, and the seeds inside have been used to make coffee substitute with limited success. However, the bark of cascara, another member of the genus Frangula, is toxic.

Native Americans of the west coast of North America had several uses for the plant as food, and used parts of it as a traditional medicinal plant. Several tribes of the indigenous peoples of California ate the fruit fresh or dried.

The Ohlone people use the leaves to treat poison oak dermatitis. The Kumeyaay people had similar uses for its bark. The Kawaiisu used the fruit to treat wounds such as burns. The bark has been widely used as a laxative tea by the Chumash and Ohlone. The roots have been used by indigenous people for toothache remedies, kidney troubles, and a counteract for poisioning as well. The leaves were rubbed on the skin directly to help heal infected open injuries.

Names for the plant in the Konkow language of the Concow tribe include pä and pö.
