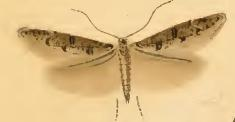
- Sorhagenia rhamniella

Scientific classification
- Domain: Eukaryota
- Kingdom: Animalia
- Phylum: Arthropoda
- Class: Insecta
- Order: Lepidoptera
- Family: Cosmopterigidae
- Subfamily: Chrysopeleiinae
- Genus: Sorhagenia; Spuler, 1910

Synonyms
- Sorhageniella Riedl, 1965; Cystioecetes Braun, 1915

= Sorhagenia =

Genus of moths

Sorhagenia is a genus of moths in the family Cosmopterigidae. The name honours Ludwig Friedrich Sorhagen.

== Species ==
- Sorhagenia baucidis Hodges, 1969
- Sorhagenia cracens Hodges, 1978
- Sorhagenia daedala Hodges, 1964
- Sorhagenia dahurica Sinev, 1986
- Sorhagenia fibigeri Koster & Sinev, 2003
- Sorhagenia griseella Sinev, 1993
- Sorhagenia janiszewskae Riedl, 1962
- Sorhagenia lophyrella Douglas, 1846
- Sorhagenia maurella Sinev
- Sorhagenia nimbosus (Braun, 1915) (syn: Sorhagenia nimbosa)
- Sorhagenia pexa Hodges, 1969
- Sorhagenia reconditella Riedl, 1983
- Sorhagenia rhamniella (Zeller, 1839)
- Sorhagenia riedli Sinev, 1986
- Sorhagenia taurensis Koster & Sinev, 2003
- Sorhagenia vicariella Sinev, 1993
