= Sorhagenia taurensis =

Scientific classification
- Kingdom: Animalia
- Phylum: Arthropoda
- Clade: Pancrustacea
- Class: Insecta
- Order: Lepidoptera
- Family: Cosmopterigidae
- Genus: Sorhagenia
- Species: S. taurensis

Binomial name
- Sorhagenia taurensis Koster & Sinev, 2003

Species of insect

Sorhagenia taurensis is a moth in the family Cosmopterigidae. It is found in Asia Minor.

The wingspan is 6–7 millimetres (0.24–0.28 in). Adults have been recorded in mid July.

== Etymology ==
The species is named for the type location, the Taurus Mountains.
