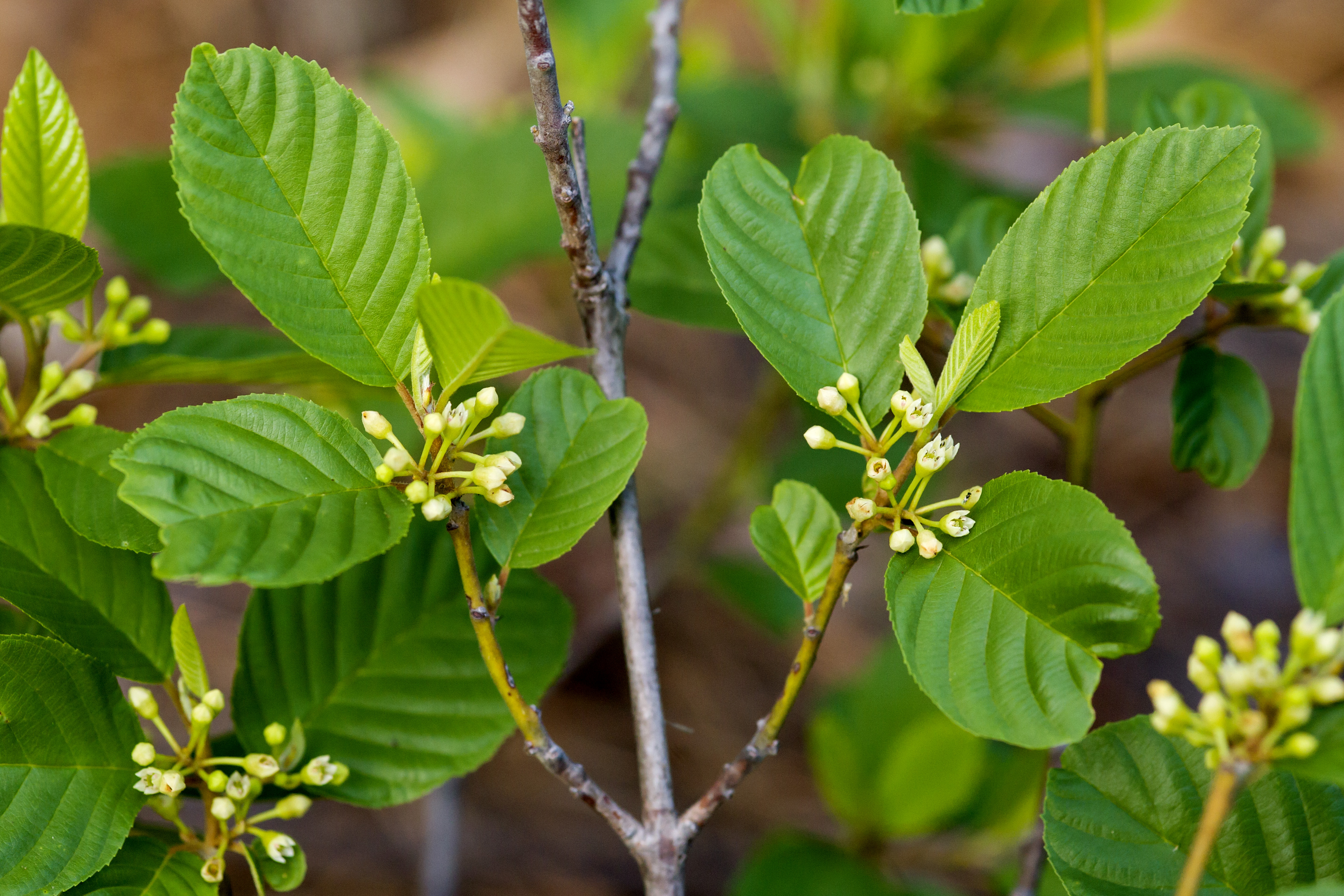
- Frangula betulifolia

Conservation status
- Least Concern (IUCN 3.1)

- Apparently Secure (NatureServe)

Scientific classification
- Kingdom: Plantae
- Clade: Tracheophytes
- Clade: Angiosperms
- Clade: Eudicots
- Clade: Rosids
- Order: Rosales
- Family: Rhamnaceae
- Genus: Frangula
- Species: F. betulifolia

Binomial name
- Frangula betulifolia (Greene) Grubov
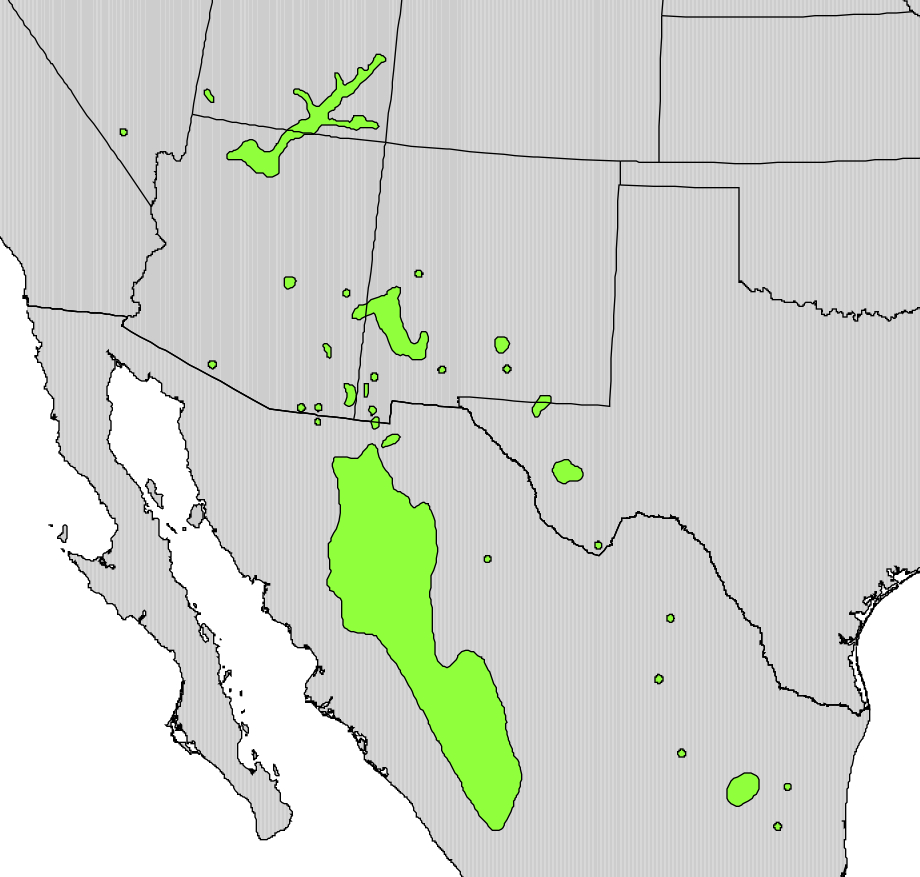
- Natural range

Synonyms
- Rhamnus betulifolia Greene; Rhamnus confinis Greene; Rhamnus ellipsoidea Greene; Rhamnus purshiana var. betulifolia (Greene) Cory

= Frangula betulifolia =

Birchleaf buckthorn

Species of flowering plant

Frangula betulifolia, the birchleaf buckthorn, is a shrub or small tree in the buckthorn family, Rhamnaceae. It is native in northern Mexico in the Sierra Madre Occidental cordillera, and mountainous, desert regions of the Southwestern United States of Arizona, Utah, New Mexico, and far west Texas; besides being found in Sonora, Chihuahua and Durango of the Occidental cordillera, a large species locale occurs to the east in Nuevo León.

Frangula betulifolia has large ovate leaves, and can grow to be a small tree from 3-10m tall. Blooms in spring, May–June, followed by black-purple fruits in fall. The inner bark was chewed by Native Americans for medicinal purposes.

The former variety obovata with rounder leaves, occurring from southern Nevada through northern Arizona and southern Utah to southwestern Colorado, is now a separate species Frangula obovata.

== Range ==
The core range of the birchleaf buckthorn is the northern Sierra Madre Occidental cordillera, from central Durango, north to west-southwest Chihuahua, and eastern Sonora; it also ranges just north at the Arizona-New Mexico, Sonora-Chihuahua borders, a region called the Madrean Sky Islands, of sky island mountain ranges.

Other medium-sized range locales occur at: central, southwest New Mexico, (an extension east from the Mogollon Rim–White Mountains of the Arizona transition zone); the Grand Canyon of the Colorado River with the range extending upriver into the Canyon Lands of southeast Utah; western Texas; and southern Nuevo León. Other states with more minor-sized locales are Nevada, Coahuila, and Tamaulipas.

== Uses ==
Various songbirds and small mammals consume the berries, which are edible but unpalatable, and deer and bighorn sheep browse the foliage.
