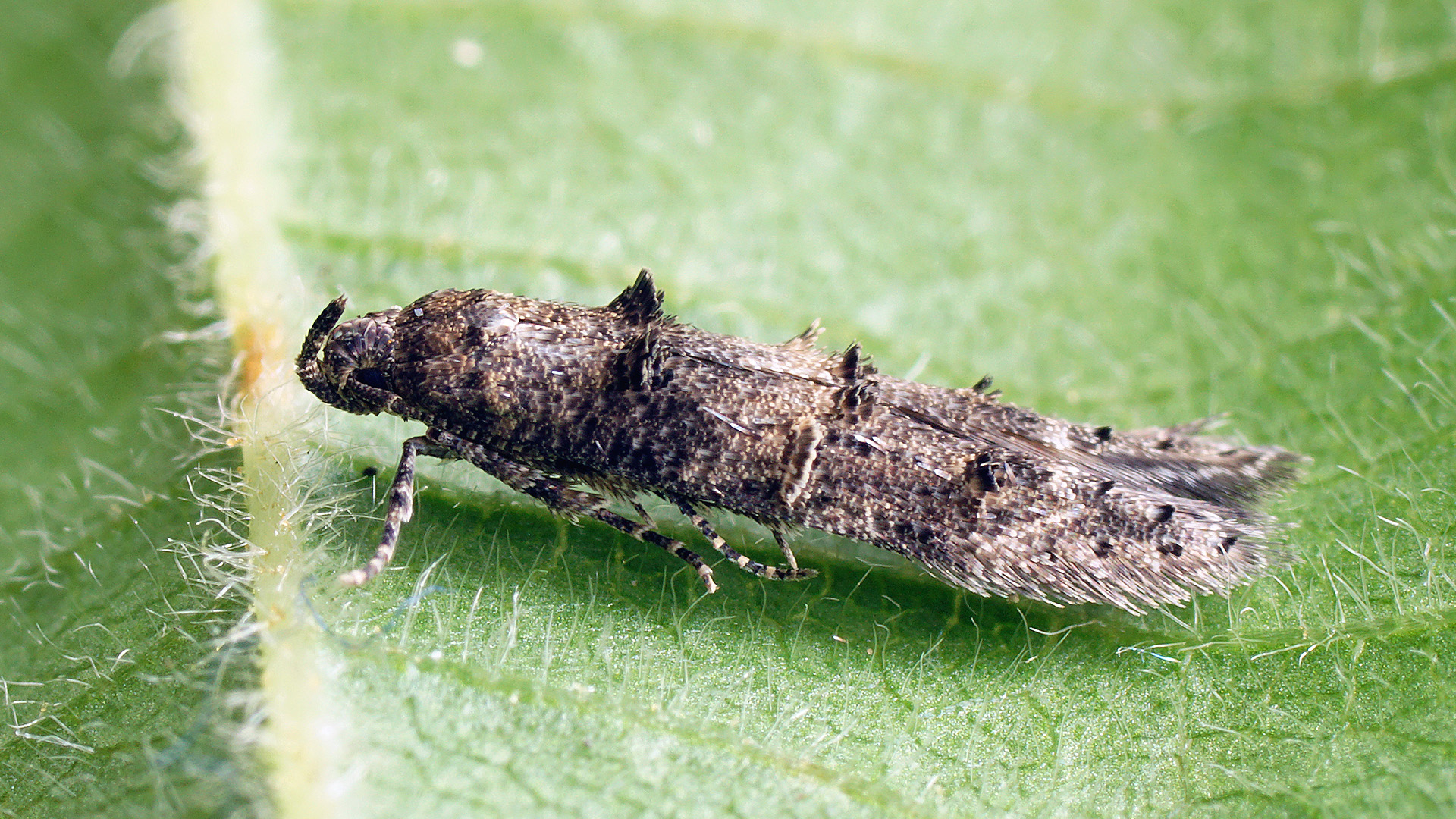

Scientific classification
- Domain: Eukaryota
- Kingdom: Animalia
- Phylum: Arthropoda
- Class: Insecta
- Order: Lepidoptera
- Family: Cosmopterigidae
- Genus: Sorhagenia
- Species: S. janiszewskae

Binomial name
- Sorhagenia janiszewskae Riedl, 1962

= Sorhagenia janiszewskae =

Species of moth

Sorhagenia janiszewskae is a moth in the family Cosmopterigidae. It is found from Great Britain to Russia and from Fennoscandia to France, Switzerland, Austria, Croatia, Hungary and Romania. It has also been reported from Portugal, the Caucasus and western Transcaucasia.

The wingspan is 8–11 mm. Adults are on wing from mid June to August in one generation per year.

The larvae feed on Rhamnus fragula and sometimes also Rhamnus cathartica. Larvae can be found from May to June.
