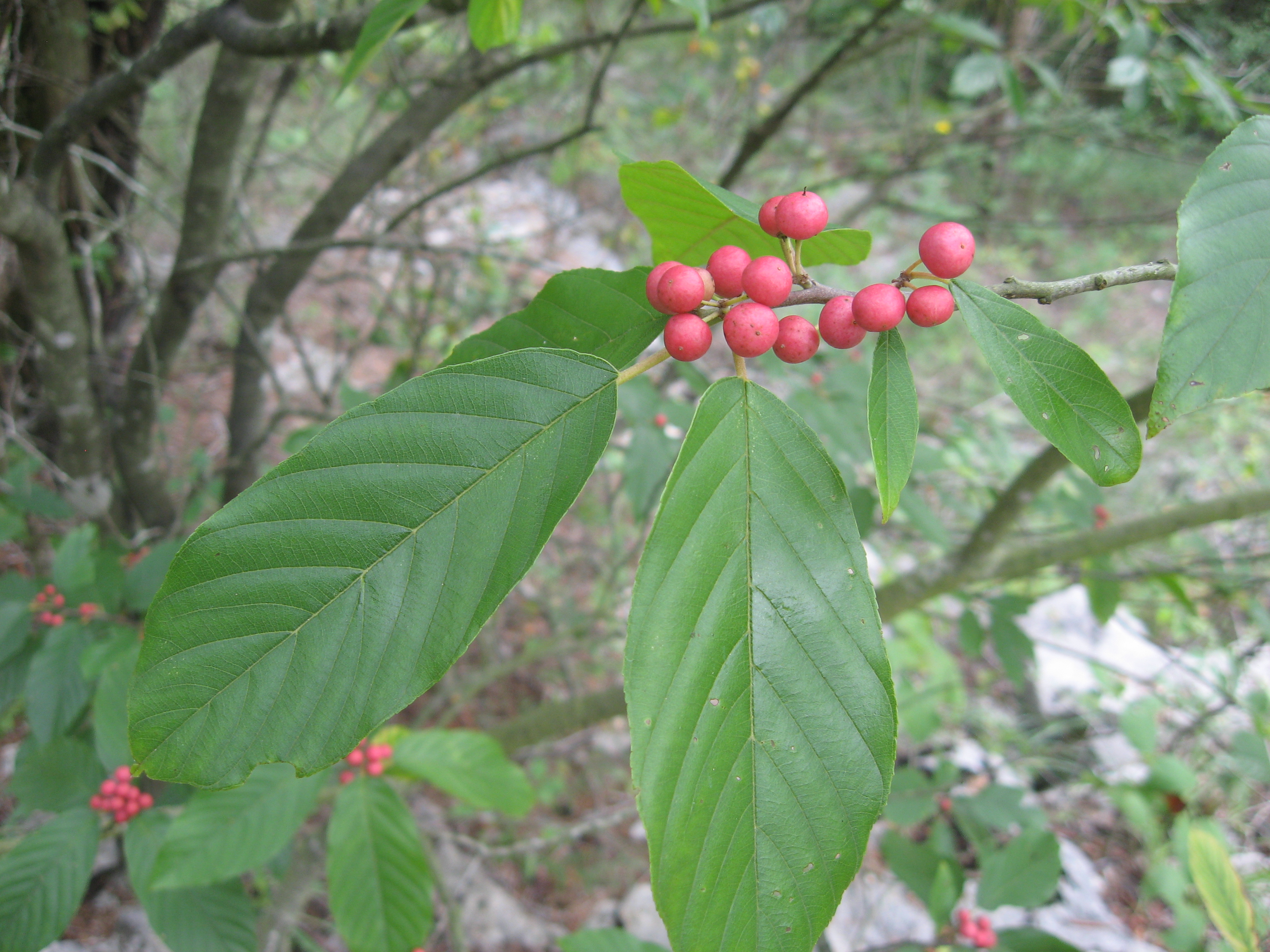

Conservation status
- Least Concern (IUCN 3.1)

Scientific classification
- Kingdom: Plantae
- Clade: Tracheophytes
- Clade: Angiosperms
- Clade: Eudicots
- Clade: Rosids
- Order: Rosales
- Family: Rhamnaceae
- Genus: Frangula
- Species: F. caroliniana

Binomial name
- Frangula caroliniana (Walter) A.Gray
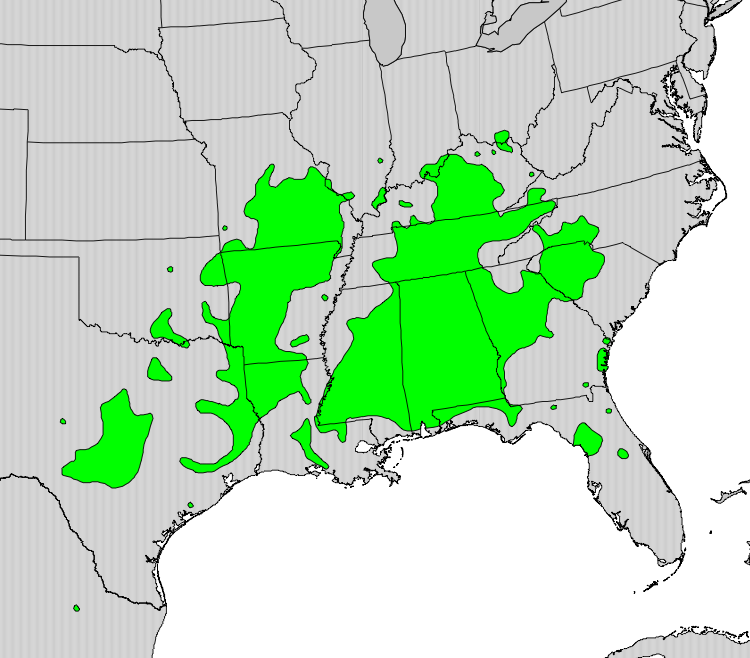
- Generalized natural range of Frangula caroliniana

Synonyms
- Frangula caroliniana var. mollis (Fernald) Mohlenbr.; Frangula fragilis Raf.; Rhamnus canadensis K.Koch; Rhamnus caroliniana Walter; Rhamnus caroliniana var. mollis Fernald; Rhamnus virginica J.Kenn.; Sarcomphalus carolinianus (Walter) Raf.

= Frangula caroliniana =

Species of flowering plant in the buckthorn family

Frangula caroliniana, commonly called the Carolina buckthorn, is a North American species of shrub or small tree.

== Description ==
Frangula caroliniana is usually around 12 to 15 feet (3.7 to 4.6 meters) high, but capable of reaching 40 ft (12 m) in a shaded location. The most striking characteristic of this plant are its shiny, dark green deciduous leaves. The flowers are very small and inconspicuous, pale yellow-green, bell-shaped, appearing in leaf axils in late spring after the leaves. The fruit is a round drupe, 8.3 millimeters (1/4 inch); at first it is red, but later turns black with juicy and sweet but slight flesh. It ripens in late summer.

Despite its common name, the Carolina buckthorn is completely thornless.

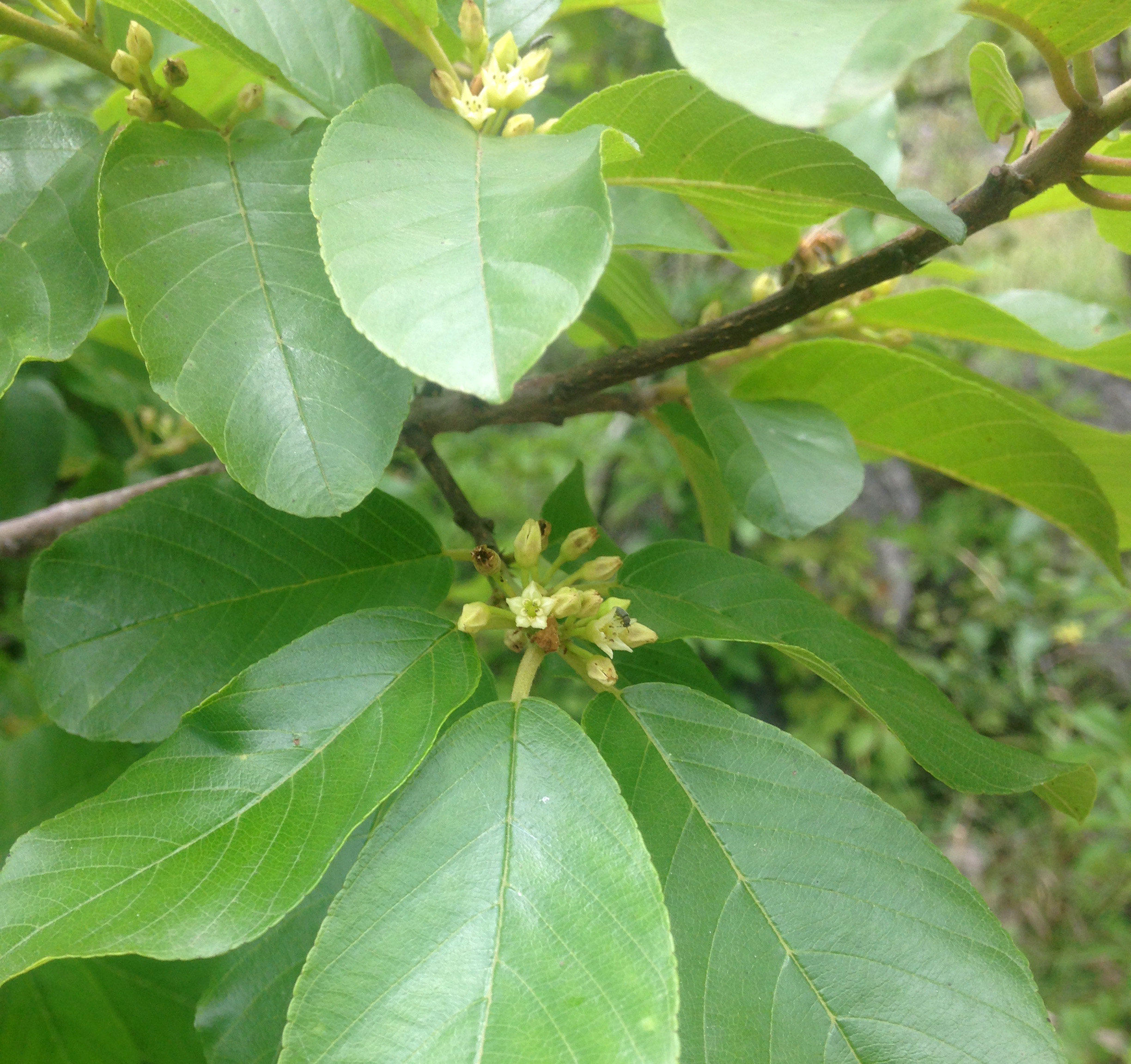
In bloom

== Distribution and habitat ==
The species is native to the southeastern, south-central, and mid-western parts of the United States, from Texas east to Florida and north as far as Maryland, Ohio, Missouri, and Oklahoma. There is also an isolated population in the State of Nuevo León in northeastern Mexico. It is found in a wide variety of habitats, including barrens, forests, and limestone bluffs.

== Ecology and uses ==
Wildlife such as songbirds eat the fruits, which are reported to have medicinal uses.
