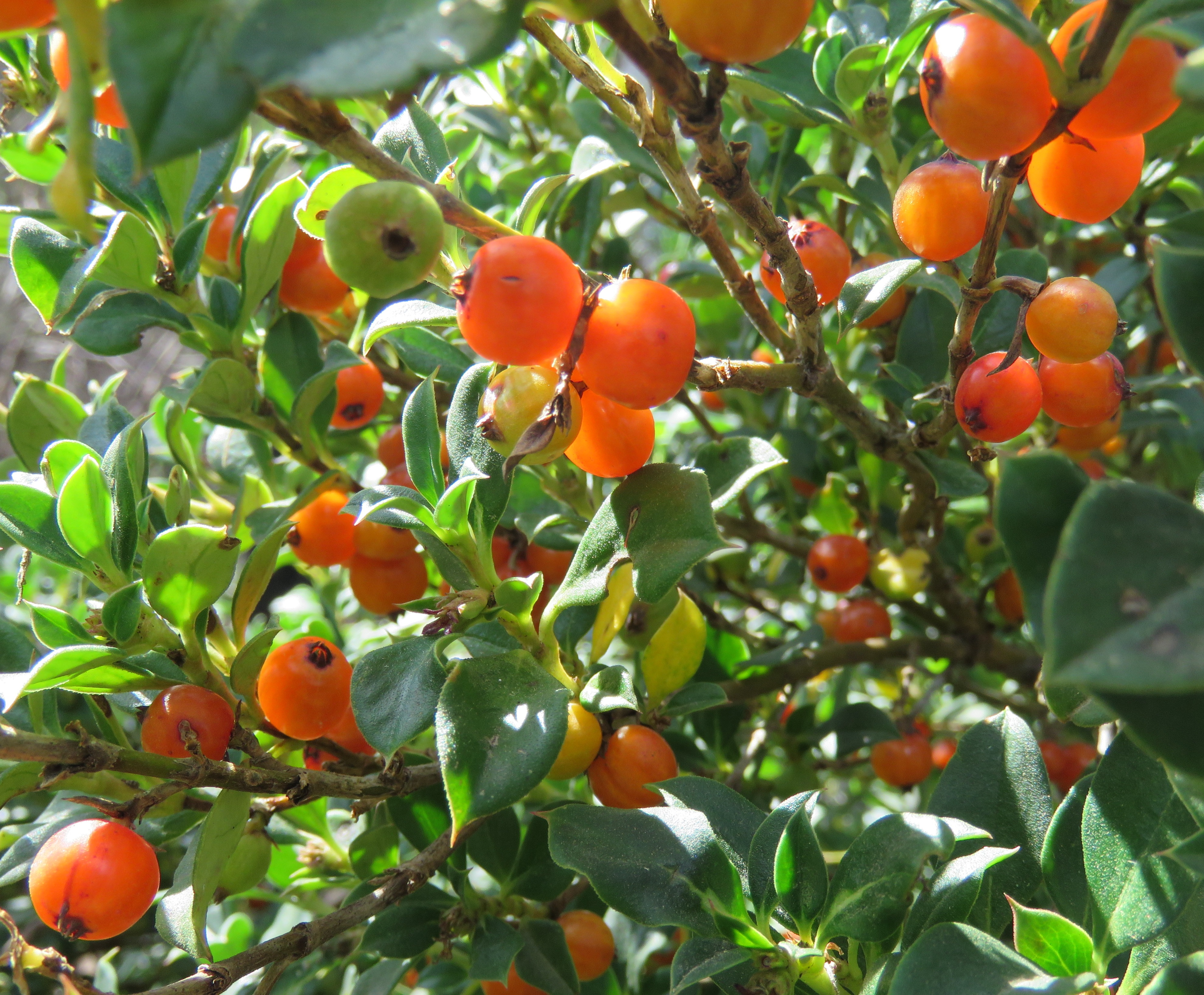

Scientific classification
- Kingdom: Plantae
- Clade: Tracheophytes
- Clade: Angiosperms
- Clade: Eudicots
- Clade: Asterids
- Order: Gentianales
- Family: Rubiaceae
- Genus: Coprosma
- Species: C. hirtella

Binomial name
- Coprosma hirtella Labill.

= Coprosma hirtella =

Coffee-berry

Species of plant

Coprosma hirtella, or coffee-berry, is a shrub in the family Rubiaceae. It is endemic to south-eastern Australia. It grows to about 2 metres high and has leaves that are between 15 and 50 mm long and 10 to 25 mm wide. Plants have male and female flower clusters that appear between August and April. These are followed by orange to reddish fruits that are 7 to 8 mm in diameter.

The species was formally described by French botanist Jacques Labillardière in 1805, based on plant specimens collected in Tasmania. It is a common plant of moist montane forests in New South Wales, Victoria and Tasmania.

The 1889 book The Useful Native Plants of Australia records "Fruit sweet, eatable, not agreeable. The fruits of other species may be eaten also."
