= Ludwig Friedrich Sorhagen =

German entomologist

Ludwig Friedrich Sorhagen (18 August 1836, in Mühlhausen – 14 July 1914, in Hamburg) was a German entomologist who specialised in Microlepidoptera. His training at the University of Halle began in 1858 and included classical philology and German studies, but also geography and natural sciences. He became a teacher. Sorhagen was a Burschenschaft liberal. He is honoured in the genus name Sorhagenia

== Works ==
- Sorhagen, L F., 1922. Beiträge zur Biologie Europäischer Nepticula Arten. Arch. Naturgesch.

== Collections ==
His collection of Palearctic moths and leafminers is held by the Zoologisches Museum, Hamburg.
