= Sorhagenia daedala =

Scientific classification
- Kingdom: Animalia
- Phylum: Arthropoda
- Class: Insecta
- Order: Lepidoptera
- Family: Cosmopterigidae
- Genus: Sorhagenia
- Species: S. daedala

Binomial name
- Sorhagenia daedala Hodges, 1964

Species of moth

Sorhagenia daedala is a moth in the family Cosmopterigidae. It was described by Ronald W. Hodges in 1964. It is found in North America, where it has been recorded from California.
