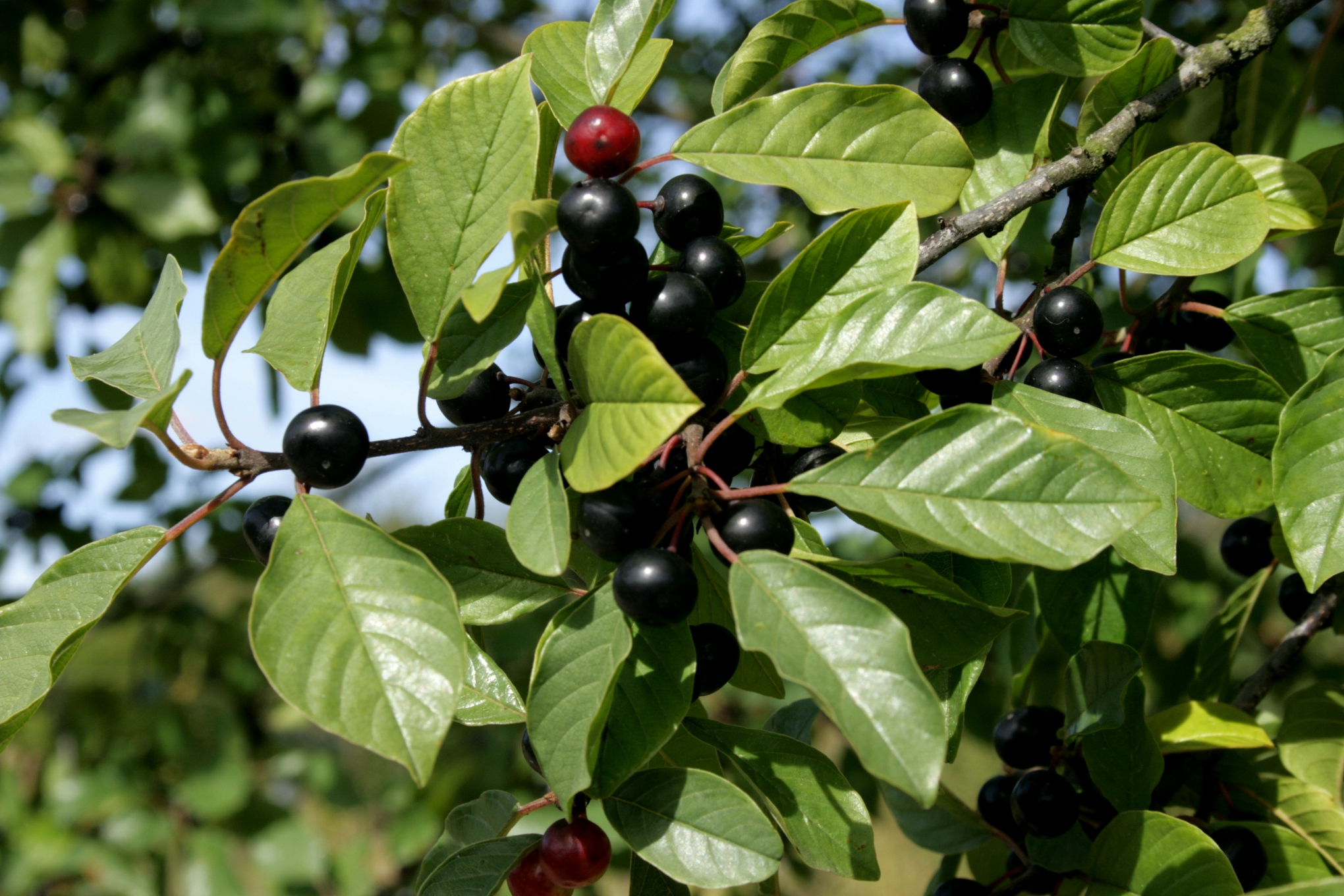
- Frangula alnus

Scientific classification
- Kingdom: Plantae
- Clade: Embryophytes
- Clade: Tracheophytes
- Clade: Angiosperms
- Clade: Eudicots
- Clade: Rosids
- Order: Rosales
- Family: Rhamnaceae
- Tribe: Rhamneae
- Genus: Frangula; Mill.

Species
- See text

= Frangula =

Genus of flowering plants in the buckthorn family

Frangula is a genus of about 56 species of flowering shrubs or small trees, commonly known as buckthorn, in the buckthorn family Rhamnaceae. The common name buckthorn is also used to describe species of the closely related genus Rhamnus in the same family, and also the superficially similar but only distantly related sea-buckthorn, Hippophae rhamnoides in the Elaeagnaceae.

== Description ==
Frangula species are deciduous or evergreen shrubs or small trees (to 12 metres tall in F. purshiana) with dark grey-brown to blackish bark; alternate, simple leaves with stipules, buds without bud scales, branches without spines; and flowers with five small petals (cf. usually four in Rhamnus) and undivided styles. The fruit is a two- to four-seeded berry; it is dispersed by birds.

== Taxonomy ==
The species were formerly usually included within Rhamnus as a subgenus, but have increasingly been treated as a distinct genus in their own right.

The designated lectotype species is Frangula alnus Mill., based on Rhamnus frangula L.

The following species are accepted by the Plants of the World Online database (POWO):

- Frangula acuminata
- Frangula alnus – alder buckthorn
- Frangula austrosinensis
- Frangula azorica
- Frangula betulifolia – birchleaf buckthorn
- Frangula breedlovei
- Frangula californica – California buckthorn, coffeeberry
- Frangula capreifolia
- Frangula caroliniana – Carolina buckthorn
- Frangula chimalapensis
- Frangula chrysophylla
- Frangula circumscissa
- Frangula crenata
- Frangula darienensis
- Frangula dianthes
- Frangula discolor
- Frangula glaberrima
- Frangula goudotiana
- Frangula grandiflora
- Frangula grandifolia
- Frangula granulosa
- Frangula grisea
- Frangula henryi
- Frangula hintonii
- Frangula inconspicua
- Frangula lindeniana
- Frangula longipedicellata
- Frangula longipes
- Frangula longistyla
- Frangula macrocarpa
- Frangula marahuacensis
- Frangula mcvaughii
- Frangula microphylla
- Frangula mucronata
- Frangula neblinensis
- Frangula obovata
- Frangula oreodendron
- Frangula palmeri
- Frangula paruensis
- Frangula pedunculata
- Frangula pendula
- Frangula pinetorum
- Frangula polymorpha
- Frangula pringlei
- Frangula pubescens
- Frangula purshiana – cascara buckthorn
- Frangula revoluta
- Frangula rhododendriphylla
- Frangula riojae
- Frangula rubra – red buckthorn
- Frangula rupestris
- Frangula scopulorum
- Frangula sphaerosperma
- Frangula surotatensis
- Frangula ulei
- Frangula wendtii

One natural hybrid is also accepted by POWO:

- Frangula × blumeri

== Distribution ==
The genus has a near-cosmopolitan distribution, occurring throughout most of Europe and the Americas, large parts of Asia, and the far northwest of Africa; it is absent from Africa south of the Sahara, the Indian Subcontinent, and Australasia.

== Uses ==
The European species, alder buckthorn (Frangula alnus) was of major military importance in the 15th to 19th centuries, as its wood provided the best quality charcoal for gunpowder manufacture.

As with Rhamnus species, the berries are a powerful purgative.
