= Natural skin care =

Type of skin care

Natural skin care uses topical creams and lotions made of ingredients available in nature. Much of the recent literature reviews plant-derived ingredients, which may include herbs, roots, flowers and essential oils, but natural substances in skin care products include animal-derived products such as beeswax, and minerals. These substances may be combined with various carrier agents, preservatives, surfactants, humectants and emulsifiers.

There are no legal definitions in the U.S. for advertising term "natural" when applied to personal care products. Consumers often express a preference for skin products with organic and natural ingredients. However, the terms "natural" and "organic" are different and should not be used interchangeably. In the United States, the United States Department of Agriculture (USDA) oversees the National Organic Program (NOP) with strict requirements across ingredient sourcing, production, handling, and documentation; and governs organic claim eligibility. The personal skin care market based on natural products has shown strong growth. Clinical and laboratory studies have identified activities in many natural ingredients that have potential beneficial activities for personal skin care, but there is a shortage of convincing evidence for natural product efficacy in medical problems.

Some natural products and therapies may be harmful, either to the skin or systemically. People prone to allergies should pay careful attention to what they use on their skin. Dermatologists may feel that there is enough scientific evidence to assist in the selection or avoidance of particular natural ingredients.

== Background ==
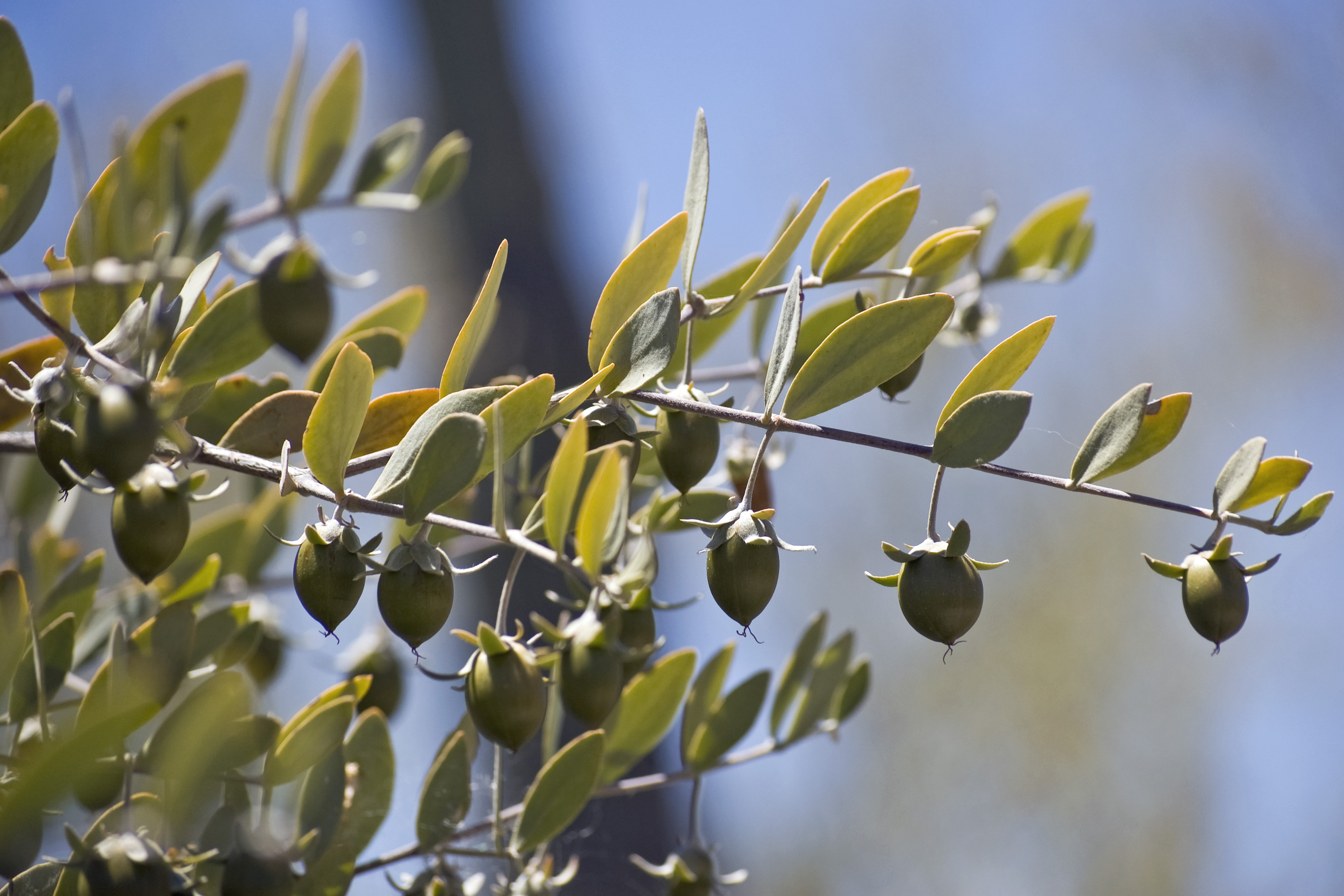
Jojoba oil is easily refined to be odorless, colorless and oxidatively stable, and is often used in cosmetics as a moisturizer and as a carrier oil for specialty fragrances

Many countries require that the ingredient composition of skin care products is listed on the product, using the International Nomenclature of Cosmetic Ingredients (INCI) conventions. Ingredients are listed in the order of their percentage within the product; natural ingredients are listed in Latin and synthetic ingredients are listed by technical name. "The U.S. government has documented more than 10,500 ingredients in cosmetic products, but only a small percentage of those chemicals have been tested for safety. Of those that have been tested, some have been identified as carcinogens (causes cancer), teratogens (causes birth defects), and reproductive toxicants (damages the ability to reproduce)."

The FDA surveyed 1,687 consumers ages 14 and older in 1994 about their use of cosmetics. Nearly half of these consumers felt that a product claiming to be "natural" should contain all natural ingredients. However, although the United States Department of Agriculture (USDA) has designated within its certain requirements within its specific area of regulation for organic products, the U.S. Food and Drug Administration (FDA) does not recognize a definition for natural products. Accordingly, there is no legal definition in the U.S. for the advertising term "natural" in personal care products. In 2023, the Strengthening Organic Enforcement rule was made effective by the US Department of Agriculture which regulates the use of the term "organic" such that the use of the wording on packaging requires certification under the National Organic Program. The FDA prohibits certain ingredients in cosmetics.

Some organic products which are designated organic may be intensely modified, sometimes considerably more so than conventional products.

== History ==
Plant extracts and herbs have been used by many cultures as cosmetics and perfumes since ancient times.

Research is scientifically assessing natural products, selected based on experience in the ancient era. Validated use of these materials and products awaits further assessment.

== Cosmetics ==
=== Consumer preference ===
Consumers often express a preference for skin products with organic and natural ingredients. The skin care market based on natural products has shown strong growth. Clinical and laboratory studies have identified activities in many natural ingredients that have potential beneficial activities for the skin. Dermatologists may feel that there is enough scientific evidence to assist in the selection of particular natural ingredients.

Consumers expected products to perform as advertised.

=== Industry response ===
Voluntary discontinuation of precursor substances that release small quantities of formaldehyde, which is a carcinogen, as well as reducing levels of the potentially carcinogenic impurity 1,4-dioxane. Polycyclic musk fragrance ingredients, which have raised concerns as persistent and bioaccumulative endocrine disruptors, are being discontinued.

== Alternative medicine ==
There are significant reservations about complementary and alternative medicine (CAM) including a "shortage of evidence supporting the efficacy and safety of CAM" for skin problems. However, patients express a desire to utilize natural ingredients as treatment. A literature search found a growing prevalence of CAM use for skin conditions. A number of textbooks address CAM perspectives of skin care. The purpose of this section is to review botanical compounds in skin care; a broader review the history and theory behind other CAM modalities such as psychocutaneous therapies, acupuncture and homeopathy can be found in recent reviews.

=== Western ===
The plant monographs with dermatological relevance of the former German Commission E have recently been reviewed.

According to Baumann, "Botanical compounds for which dermatologic and cosmetic applications have emerged include: olive oil, chamomile, colloidal oatmeal, oat kernel extract, feverfew, acai berry, coffee berry, curcumin, green tea, pomegranate, licorice, paper mulberry, arbutin, and soy. "Many of these botanical sources offer biologically active components that require further in vitro and in vivo investigation".

A review of 35 plant families found that a "variety of phytomolecules, derived in particular from polyphenols, triterpenes and sterols classes, demonstrated a promising activity."

Colloidal oatmeal may be beneficial in psoriasis. Aloe vera may help in atopic dermatitis. In both these conditions, the benefit may arise from anti-inflammatory properties. "For combating acne and rosacea, green tea, niacinamide and feverfew are considered efficacious. For hyperpigmentation and antioxidative capabilities, licorice, green tea, arbutin, soy, acai berry, turmeric and pomegranate are among those plants and compounds found to be most beneficial. Additional research is needed to determine to confirm and elucidate the benefits of these ingredients in the prevention and management of skin disease."

An assessment of clinical trials on green tea preparations and their uses in dermatology found some evidence for potential benefits.

=== Ayurveda ===
Ayurvedic skincare is derived from medicinal practices that began over 5,000-years ago in India. Ayurvedic medicine and healing practices are based on Indian philosophical, psychological, conventional, and medicinal understandings. Most of the ayurvedic skincare products contain the following herbs—aloe vera, almond, avocado, carrot, castor, clay, cocoa, coconut oil, cornmeal, cucumber, cutch tree, emu oil, ginkgo biloba, ginseng, grape seed oil, ground almond and walnut shell, horse chestnut, witch hazel, and honey.

Ayurvedic approaches have been used in molluscum contagiosum, lymphatic filariasis, vitiligo and lichen planus.

Phyllanthus emblica (amla, Indian gooseberry) has been used in ayurvedic medicine. Standardized extracts of Phyllanthus emblica have a long-lasting and broad-spectrum antioxidant activity. This may be suitable for use in Anti-aging cream, sunscreen and general purpose skin care products.

=== Substances ===
Natural skin care ingredients include jojoba, safflower oil, rose hip seed oil, shea butter, beeswax, witch hazel, aloe vera, tea tree oil, coconut oil, and chamomile.

- Egg oil can be used as an excipient/carrier in a variety of cosmetic preparations such as creams, ointments, sun-screen products, or lotions. In Indian, Japanese, Unani (Roghan Baiza Murgh) and Chinese traditional medicine, egg oil was traditionally used as a treatment for hair care.
- Jojoba is used for skin care because it is a natural moisturizer for the skin. Jojoba is actually a liquid wax that becomes solid below room temperature, but is known as an oil.
- Shea butter is derived from the kernel of the shea tree (Vitellaria paradoxa). Shea butter is known for its cosmetic properties as a moisturizer and emollient.

=== Research ===
Dermatological research suggests that the bioactive ingredients used in cosmeceuticals have benefits beyond the traditional moisturizer (e.g., Chen et al., 2005; Zettersten, Ghadially, Feingold, Crumrine, & Elias, 1997). However, despite reports of benefits from some cosmeceutical products, there are no formal requirements to prove that these products live up to their claims.

Biocompatible and environmentally friendly natural compounds have the potential to provide materials with photoresistant and thermoresistant properties.

Dehydroabietic acid (DAA), a naturally occurring diterpene resin acid, "has lifespan extension effects in Caenorhabditis elegans, prevents lipofuscin accumulation, and prevents collagen secretion in human dermal fibroblasts. We found that these anti-aging effects are primarily mediated by SIRT1 activation." DAA may activate SIRT1 enzymatic activity, which may have a preventive effect against the aging process.

Validated use of these materials and products awaits further assessment.

== Related products ==
Cosmeceuticals are topically applied, combination products that bring together cosmetics and "biologically active ingredients". Products which are similar in perceived benefits but ingested orally are known as nutricosmetics. According to the United States Food and Drug Administration (FDA), the Food, Drug, and Cosmetic Act "does not recognize any such category as "cosmeceuticals". A product can be a drug, a cosmetic, or a combination of both, but the term "cosmeceutical" has no meaning under the law". Drugs are subject to an intensive review and approval process by FDA. Cosmetics, and these related products, although regulated, are not approved by FDA prior to sale.

== Cautions ==
Some alternative and natural products and therapies may be harmful, either to the skin or systemically.

The FDA recommends understanding the ingredient label and says "There is no list of ingredients that can be guaranteed not to cause allergic reactions, so consumers who are prone to allergies should pay careful attention to what they use on their skin", further warning that "[t]here is no basis in fact or scientific legitimacy to the notion that products containing natural ingredients are good for the skin". Food preservatives are commonly used to preserve the safety and efficacy in these products. Alternative remedies may increase the prevalence of eczema. Bhuchar recommends that "ingestible substances including most homeopathic, Ayurvedic, and traditional Chinese medicine herbal formulations that are not US FDA regulated should be viewed with caution as they may cause severe adverse effects" such as arsenic poisoning and liver failure."

Given the shortage of evidence for natural skin care efficacy, if applied it may often need to be used in combination with conventional treatment, rather than independently. In fact, a recent 2022 study found that nearly all skin products that have the label "natural" actually contained ingredients that triggered contact dermatitis. The study looked at nearly 1,700 products.

According to Bhuchar, there is a consensus in the literature that dermatologists need more information about CAM. Wu advises that "dermatologists should be aware of what patients may be using and be able to advise them about the efficacy of these ingredients or the potential for adverse effects". Many patients fail to inform their physicians about their use of herbal ingredients.
