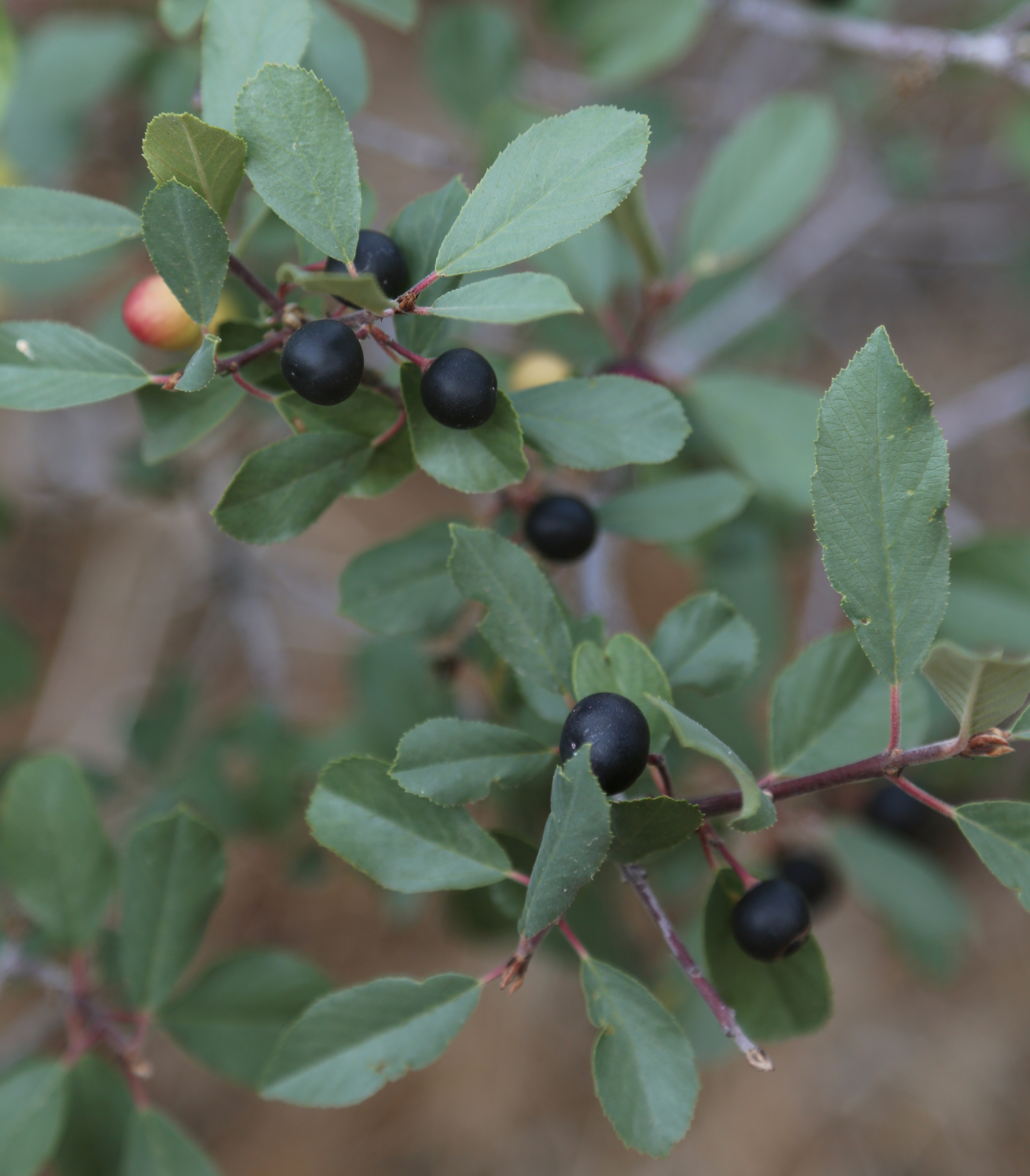

Conservation status
- Apparently Secure (NatureServe)

Scientific classification
- Kingdom: Plantae
- Clade: Tracheophytes
- Clade: Angiosperms
- Clade: Eudicots
- Clade: Rosids
- Order: Rosales
- Family: Rhamnaceae
- Genus: Frangula
- Species: F. rubra

Binomial name
- Frangula rubra (Greene) Grubov

Synonyms
- Rhamnus rubra Greene

= Frangula rubra =

Species of flowering plant

Frangula rubra (syn. Rhamnus rubra) is a species of flowering plant in the buckthorn family known by the common names red buckthorn and Sierra coffeeberry.

== Description ==
Frangula rubra is a spreading shrub approaching 2 metres (6 1/2 ft) in maximum height, its bark red or gray. The thin, deciduous leaves are generally oval in shape, green to grayish in color, and up to 6 centimetres (2 1/2 in) long. The edges are smooth or faintly toothed. The inflorescence is an umbel of up to 15 flowers with five pointed sepals opening into a starlike shape and five smaller, greenish petals. The fruit is a drupe which ripens to black. It measures just over 1 cm (0.39 in) long and contains 2 seeds.

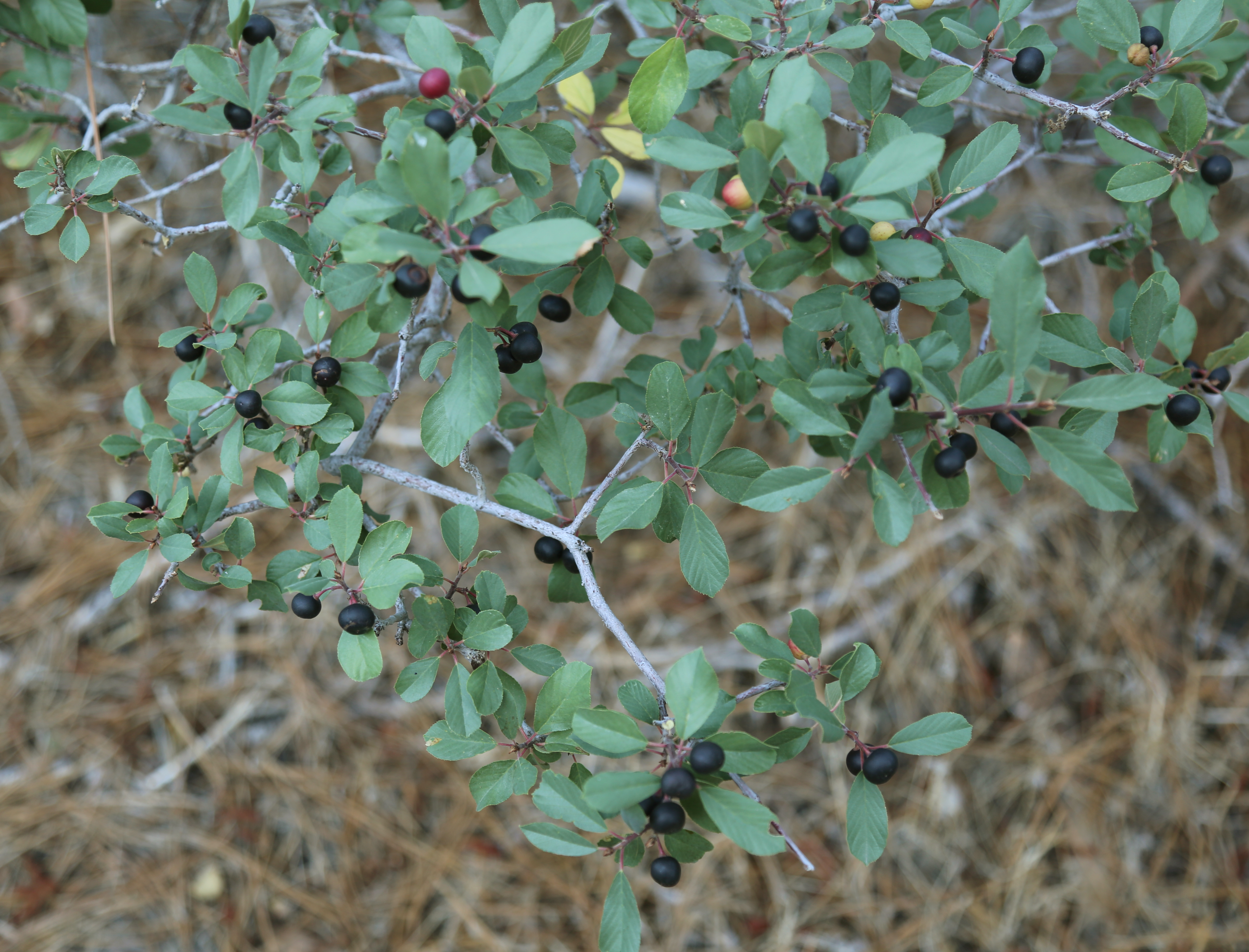
Foliage

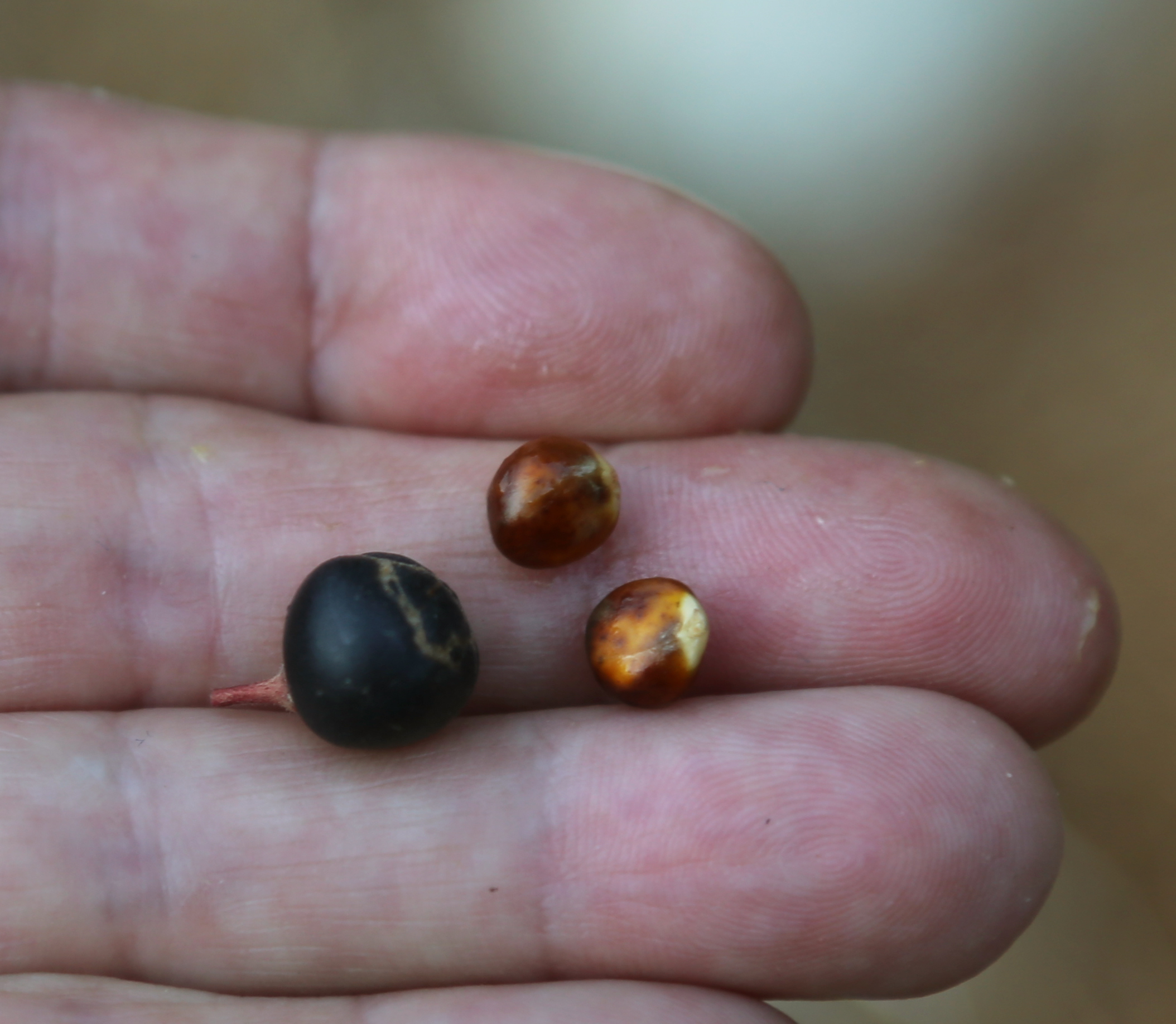
Berry and seeds

== Distribution and habitat ==
It is native to the mountains and plateau areas of northern and eastern California and western Nevada, including the Sierra Nevada and Klamath Mountains, where it grows in many habitat types, including forests, chaparral, and sagebrush.

== Adverse effects ==
The berry is inedible and may have a laxative effect.
