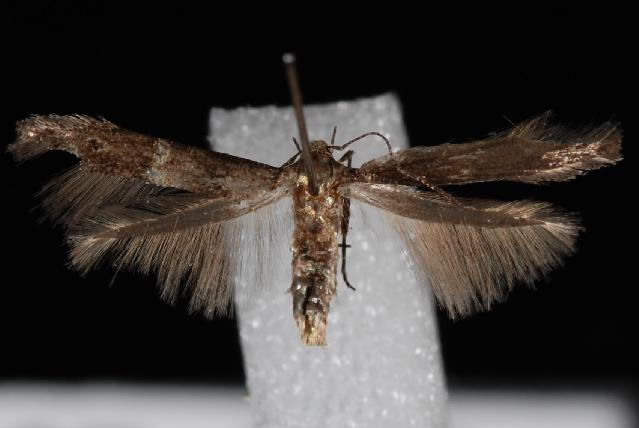

Scientific classification
- Kingdom: Animalia
- Phylum: Arthropoda
- Clade: Pancrustacea
- Class: Insecta
- Order: Lepidoptera
- Family: Cosmopterigidae
- Genus: Sorhagenia
- Species: S. nimbosus

Binomial name
- Sorhagenia nimbosus (Braun, 1915)

Synonyms
- Cystioecetes nimbosus Braun, 1915; Sorhagenia nimbosa (Braun, 1915)

= Sorhagenia nimbosus =

Species of moth

Sorhagenia nimbosus, the midrib gall moth, is a moth in the family Cosmopterigidae. It was described by Annette Frances Braun in 1915. It is found in North America, where it has been recorded from British Columbia, Washington and California.

Adults have been recorded on wing from March to October.
