= Chumash Indian Museum =

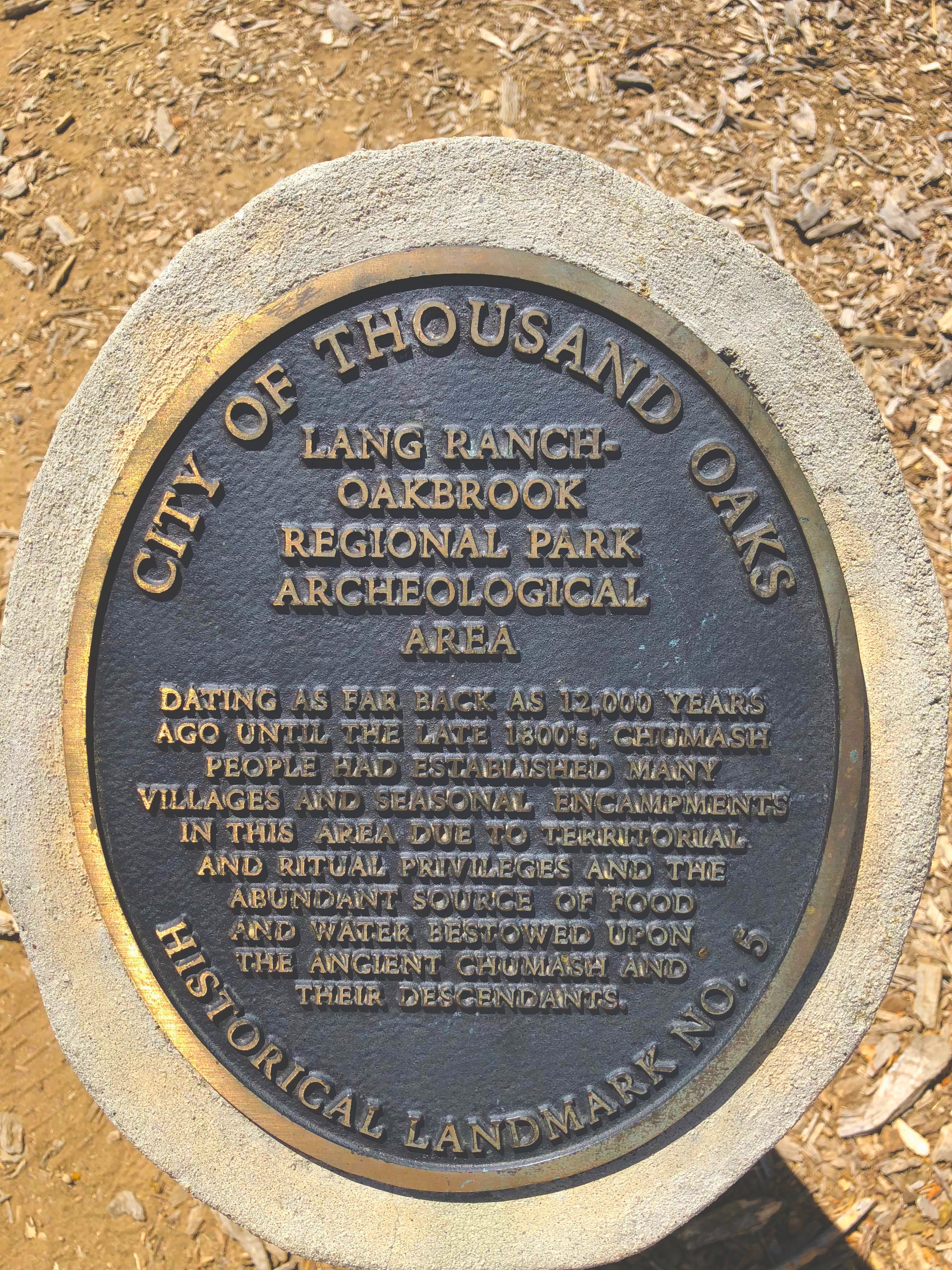
- Plaque by entrance.
- Established: 1994
- Location: 3290 Lang Ranch Pkwy, Thousand Oaks, CA
- Coordinates: 34.212307°N 118.815211°W
- Type: Chumash Interpretive Center
- Public transit access: Thousand Oaks Transit (TOT)
- Website: www.chumashmuseum.org

Chumash Indian Museum is a Native American Interpretive Center in northeast Thousand Oaks, California. It is the site of a former Chumash village, known as Sap'wi (meaning "House of the Deer"). It is located in Oakbrook Regional Park, a 432-acre park which is home to a replica of a Chumash village and thousand year-old Chumash pictographs. The pictographs by nearby Birthing Cave are not open to the public, but can be observed on docent-led tours. Chumash people inhabited the village 10,000 years ago.

It became a designated archaeological zone in 1971 after the discovery of nearly twenty caves at the property. It was designated Ventura County Historical Landmark #90 in 1983. It is designated Thousand Oaks City Landmark No. 5. The museum is home to exhibits of various Chumash artifacts, paintings and historical items.

Dedicated to preserving the cultural and historical legacy of the Chumash people, the museum was established in 1994 and is operated by the nonprofit Oakbrook Park Chumash Indian Corp. It is owned by Conejo Recreation and Park District.

The museum grounds were severely damaged by the 2018 Woolsey Fire.

== Pictographs ==
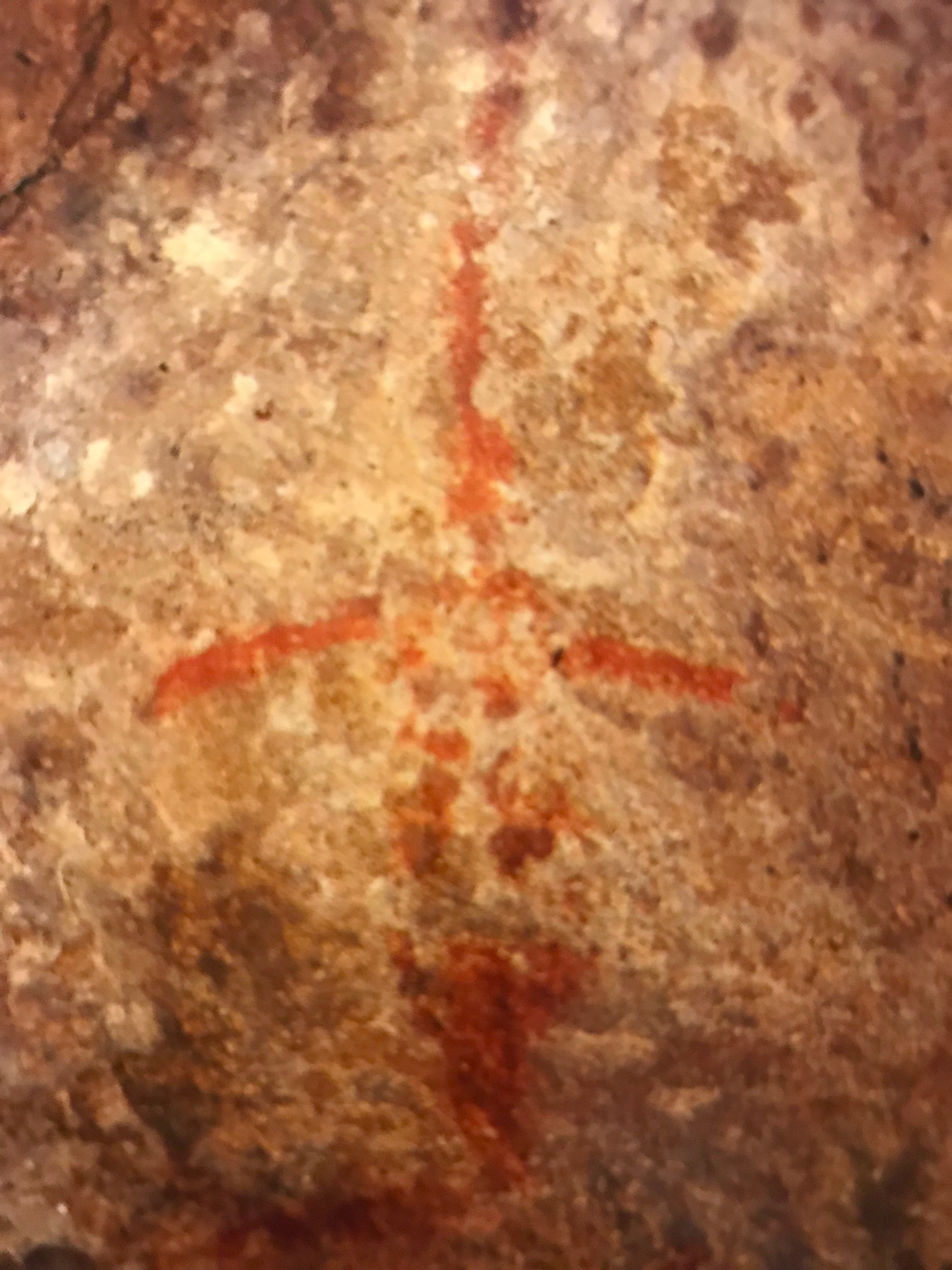
12-inch long swordfish pictograph in Oakbrook Regional Park.

The cave paintings are found in two nearby rock shelters. The two shelters comprise a few panels, each of which contains one or more red motifs. Notable paintings include that of a broadbill swordfish, which until recently, was a common species in local waters. The swordfish was one of the few fish species associated with the shaman. The pictographs most likely represent a Swordfish Shaman's spirit helper. Swordfish shamanism was truly practiced at the cave for thousands of years. The pictographs are between 4000 and 6000 years old, and can be viewed on docent-led tours.

== Exhibits ==
=== Indoor ===
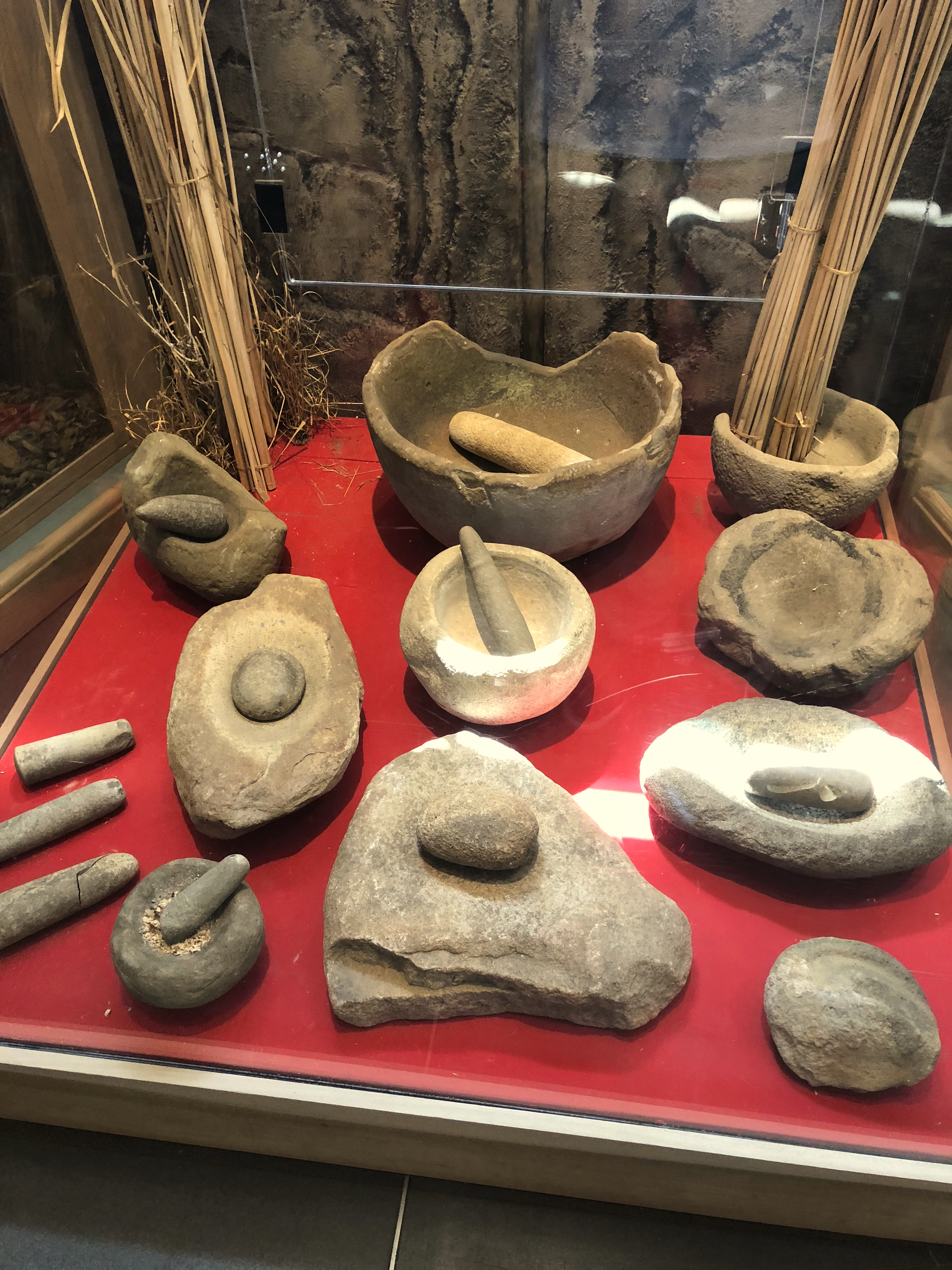
Artifacts such as mortars and pestles can be seen in the interior exhibit.

Interior parts of the 5,400 sq. ft. museum contains locally retrieved artifacts such as tools used for grinding acorns, murals, instruments, and games. It also features a reconstructed tomol (Chumash canoe), mockups of cougars and other wildlife, as well as a diorama depicting life before the Spanish arrived. Items are routinely on loan from the Santa Barbara Museum of Natural History, including woven bowls, grinding tools, and other artifacts.

=== Outdoor ===
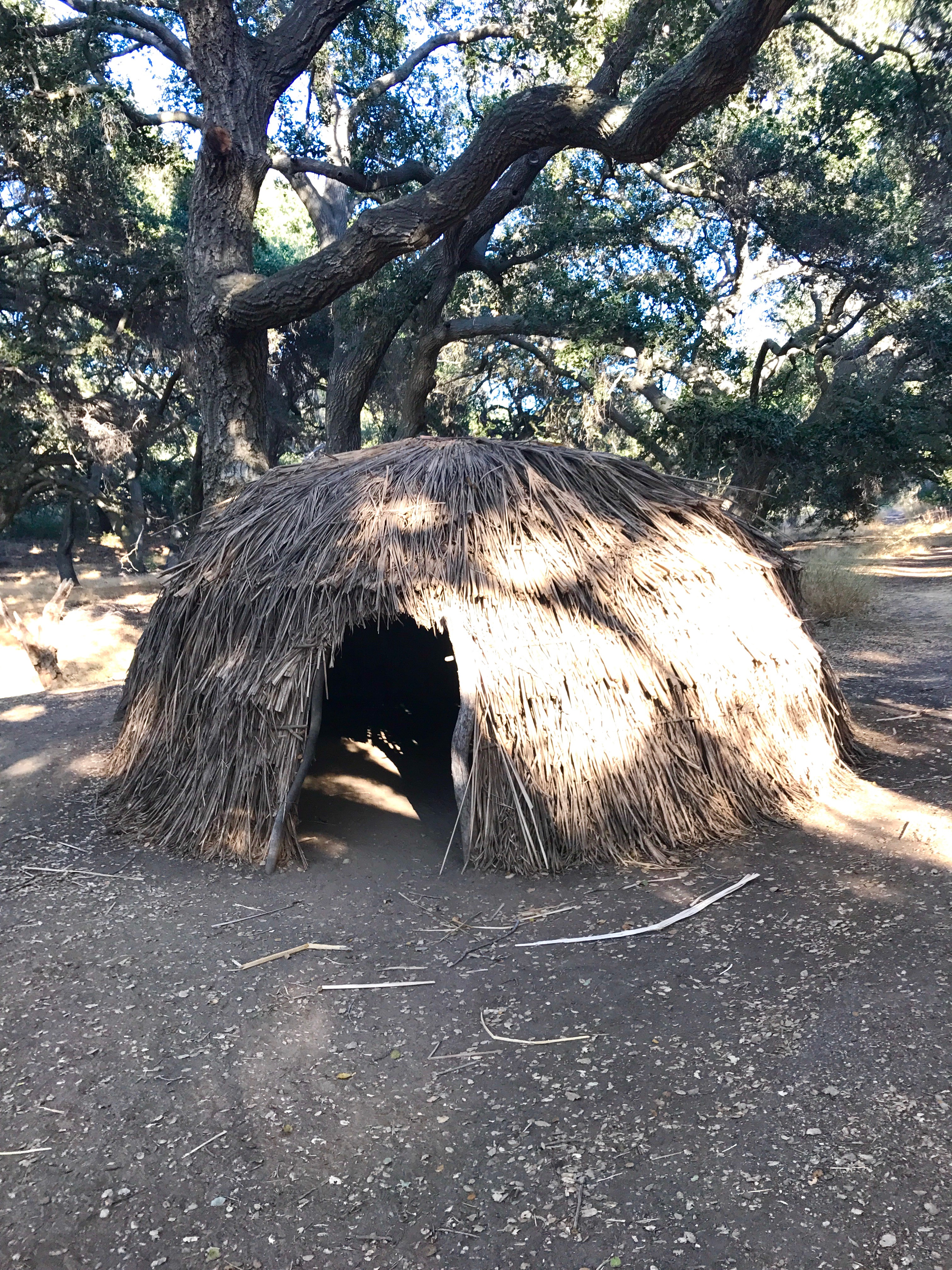
Replica of a Chumash 'ap (house) in the reconstructed Chumash village.

Outdoor exhibits include several gardens, a reconstructed Chumash village, and a traditional Chumash playing field, known as a malamtepupi. Furthermore, it contains miles of hiking trails, as well as a massive oak tree rumored to be the oldest and possibly largest in the city of Thousand Oaks. It has a 12-foot trunk diameter, a height of 30 feet, and a canopy spread of 60 feet. It is home to 11 archeological sites clustered along the stream-bed, including ancient pictographs and bedrock mortars utilized for grinding acorns and other foods.

Behind the museum is a 25-acre nature preserve in a canyon following the Conejo Creek. The shaded trail follows groves of old oak trees dating back 200–300 years, as well as mortar holes, the reconstructed Chumash village, and dramatic rock formations. The trail also goes by the remains of a former house with a brick oven. This was the site where Lang Ranch’ caretaker lived, dating back to the early 1900s. Weather-carved sandstone formations can be found after passing Bear Flats Oak Grove and crossing over Crystal Spring. Prominent formations include Elephant Rock, a finely etched rock with a trunk; and Calm Rock, shaped in the form of a partly opened clam.

== Ethnobotany Gardens ==
Four gardens featuring native flora with interpretive signs can be found near the museum. Funding for the gardens was provided by Edison International, Eagle Scouts of Troop 787, and museum volunteers.

- Riparian/Basketry Garden: represents species found along the edge of a creek. Many of these plants were utilized for basketweaving and in making fibers. Species represented include Giant Wild Rye (Ventureño: shakh), Basket Rush (Ventureño: mekjme’y), Soap Plant (Ventureño: pash), Mugwort (Ventureño: molɨsh), Milkweed (Ventureño: ‘usha’ak), Horsetail (Ventureño: kɨwɨkɨw), and Yerba Mansa (Ventureño: ‘onchoshi). Basket Rush is mainly represented here as it was the primary component of woven baskets, while Horsetail stems were utilized as sandpaper for wooden arrows and bowls. Roots of Yerba Mansa were boiled into tea, while the Chumash often ate seeds from Miner's Lettuce. Dried stems of Giant Wild Rye were used to make cigarettes, paintbrushes, knives, arrow shafts, and game counter sticks.
- Chaparral Garden: represents species found on surrounding hillsides in chaparral and coastal sage scrub habitats. Plant species represented include Chaparral Honeysuckle (Ventureño: chtu’iqonon), Island Ironwood (Ventureño: wɨ’lɨ), Toyon/Christmas Berry (Ventureño: qwe), Islay/Holly-Leaved Cherry (Ventureño: ‘akhtatapɨsh), Coffeeberry (Ventureño: chatɨshwɨ’i khus), Big Berry Manzanita (Ventureño: tsqoqo’n), Coastal Sagebrush (Ventureño: wewe’y), California Buckwheat (Ventureño: tswana’atl ‘ishup), and various other species. Numerous species provided food, such as berries of Laurel Sumac (Ventureño: walqaqsh) and seeds of Lemonadeberry. Wood from the Island Ironwood (Lyonothamnus floribundus) were used for constructing harpoons and canoe paddles, while wood from the Green Bark Lilac (Ventureño: washiko) were used for offertory poles, digging sticks, awls, plank canoe wedges, and fencing.
- Desert Garden: represents species found in drier scrublands, including the Coast Prickly Pear (Ventureño: khɨ’ɨl), chia sage (Ventureño: ‘itepesh), Thistle Sage (Ventureño: pakh), White Sage (Ventureño: khapshɨkh), Toloache/Jimsonweed (Ventureño: momoy), and Chaparral Yucca (Ventureño: shtakuk). Seeds from species such as Thistle Sage and Chia Sage were eaten, while fruits were eaten and paint pigment made of the Coast Prickly Pear. The highly toxic roots of Jimsonweed were pounded, soaked and strained in order to make a hallucinogenic drink for initiation rituals and the shaman.
- Fruits and Flower Garden: located by the museum entrance is a garden featuring endemic plants from Chumash lands that produced flowers and/or fruits. Species include Hummingbird Sage (Ventureño: pakh), Three-Leaved Sumac (Ventureño: shuna’y), California Blackberry (Ventureño: tɨhɨ), Yerba Buena (Ventureño: ‘alaqtaha), Snowberry (Ventureño: chtu ‘iqonon), California Wild Rose (Ventureño: watiq’oniq’on), Coast Live Oak (Ventureño: kuw), and Western Virgin's Bower/Creek Clematis (Ventureño: makhsik). Fruits were eaten raw from a variety of these species, including Golden Currant, Gooseberry, California Blackberry and California Wild Rose (the rose hips). The Coast Live Oak was a preferred source of acorns, but its wood was also used for stirring paddles, firewood, and shoots for the hoop in hoop-and-pole game. Leaves from Hummingbird Sage and Western Virgin's Bower were rubbed on the skin to treat sores or cure illness by sorcery.

== See also ==
- Ventura County Historic Landmarks & Points of Interest
