= Black sage =

Black sage is a common name for several plants and may refer to:

- Cordia curassavica, native to tropical America and introduced to Asia and the Pacific
- Cordia polycephala, native to the Lesser Antilles and South America
- Salvia mellifera, native to California and Baja California

== See also ==
- Black sagebrush
