= Varronia leucophlyctis =

Conservation status
- Data Deficient (IUCN 3.1)

Scientific classification
- Kingdom: Plantae
- Clade: Tracheophytes
- Clade: Angiosperms
- Clade: Eudicots
- Clade: Asterids
- Order: Boraginales
- Family: Cordiaceae
- Genus: Varronia
- Species: V. leucophlyctis

Binomial name
- Varronia leucophlyctis (Hook.f.) Andersson

Synonyms
- Cordia leucophlyctis Hook.f.; Lithocardium galopagosenum Kuntze; Lithocardium leucophlyctis (Hook.f.) Kuntze; Varronia scaberrima Andersson

Species of shrub

Varronia leucophlyctis, synonym Cordia leucophlyctis, is a shrubby plant in the family Cordiaceae, endemic to the Galápagos Islands. It has tubular white flowers.
