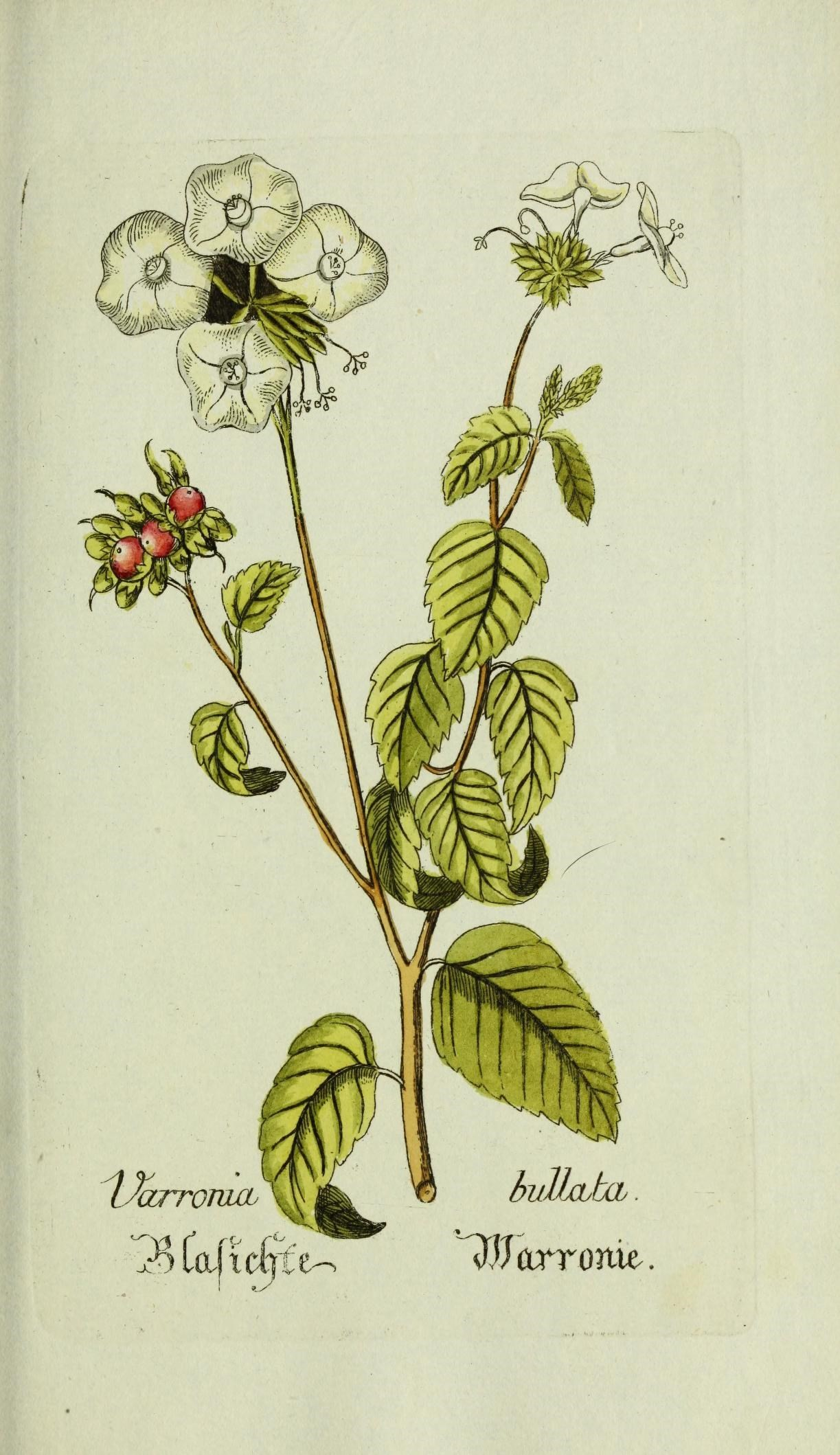
- Varronia bullata botanical illustration

Scientific classification
- Kingdom: Plantae
- Clade: Tracheophytes
- Clade: Angiosperms
- Clade: Eudicots
- Clade: Asterids
- Order: Boraginales
- Family: Cordiaceae
- Genus: Varronia; P.Browne

Species
- See text

Synonyms
- Montjolya Friesen; Piloisia Raf.; Topiaris Raf.; Ulmarronia Friesen; Varroniopsis Friesen

= Varronia =

Genus of Boraginaceae plants

Varronia is a genus of flowering plants in the family Cordiaceae. The genus was resurrected from Cordia in 2007. Varronia species are found throughout Latin America (except Chile and Patagonia), the Caribbean, and in the US states of Texas and Florida.

== Species ==
Currently accepted species include:

- Varronia acunae Moldenke
- Varronia acuta (Pittier) Borhidi
- Varronia ambigua (Schltdl. & Cham.) Borhidi
- Varronia andreana (Estrada) J.S.Mill.
- Varronia anisodonta (Urb.) Borhidi
- Varronia areolata (Urb.) Friesen
- Varronia axillaris (I.M.Johnst.) Borhidi
- Varronia badaeva (Urb. & Ekman) Borhidi
- Varronia bahamensis (Urb.) Millsp.
- Varronia baracoensis (Urb.) Borhidi
- Varronia barahonensis (Urb.) Friesen
- Varronia bellonis (Urb.) Britton
- Varronia bombardensis (Urb. & Ekman) Borhidi
- Varronia bonplandii Desv.
- Varronia braceliniae (I.M.Johnst.) Borhidi
- Varronia bridgesii Friesen
- Varronia brittonii Millsp.
- Varronia brownei (Friesen) Borhidi
- Varronia buddleoides (Rusby) J.S.Mill.
- Varronia bullata L.
- Varronia bullulata (Killip ex J.Estrada & García-Barr.) J.S.Mill.
- Varronia calcicola (Urb.) Borhidi
- Varronia calocephala (Cham.) Friesen
- Varronia campestris (Warm.) Borhidi
- Varronia candolleana Borhidi
- Varronia canescens Andersson
- Varronia caput-medusae (Taub.) Friesen
- Varronia chabrensis (Urb. & Ekman) Borhidi
- Varronia cinerascens (A.DC.) Borhidi
- Varronia clarendonensis Britton
- Varronia claviceps (Urb. & Ekman) Borhidi
- Varronia corallicola (Urb.) Borhidi
- Varronia corchorifolia (A.DC.) Borhidi
- Varronia cremersii (Feuillet) Feuillet
- Varronia crenata Ruiz & Pav.
- Varronia curassavica Jacq.
- Varronia cylindrostachya Ruiz & Pav.
- Varronia dardanoi (Taroda) J.S.Mill.
- Varronia dependens (Urb. & Ekman) Borhidi
- Varronia dichotoma Ruiz & Pav.
- Varronia discolor (Cham.) Borhidi
- Varronia duartei (Borhidi & O.Muñiz) Borhidi
- Varronia eggersii (K.Krause) J.S.Mill.
- Varronia erythrococca (Griseb.) Moldenke
- Varronia exarata (Urb.) Borhidi
- Varronia fasciata (Leonard & Alain) Borhidi
- Varronia fasciculata (Urb. & Ekman) Borhidi
- Varronia foliosa (M.Martens & Galeotti) Borhidi
- Varronia gibberosa (Urb. & Ekman) Borhidi
- Varronia glandulosa (Fresen.) Borhidi
- Varronia globosa Jacq.
- Varronia gonavensis Borhidi
- Varronia grandiflora Desv.
- Varronia grisebachii (Urb.) Moldenke
- Varronia guanacastensis (Standl.) J.S.Mill.
- Varronia guaranitica (Chodat & Hassl.) J.S.Mill.
- Varronia haitiensis (Urb.) Borhidi
- Varronia harleyi (Taroda) J.S.Mill.
- Varronia holguinensis (Borhidi & O.Muñiz) Borhidi
- Varronia iberica (Urb.) Borhidi
- Varronia inermis (Mill.) Borhidi
- Varronia integrifolia Desv.
- Varronia intricata (C.Wright) Borhidi ex Feuillet
- Varronia jamaicensis (I.M.Johnst.) Borhidi
- Varronia jeremiensis (Urb. & Ekman) Borhidi
- Varronia johnstoniana J.I.M.Melo & D.D.Vieira
- Varronia krauseana (Killip) J.S.Mill.
- Varronia lamprophylla (Urb.) Borhidi
- Varronia lanceolata Desv.
- Varronia lantanifolia J.S.Mill. & J.R.I.Wood
- Varronia lauta (I.M.Johnst.) J.S.Mill.
- Varronia lenis (Alain) Borhidi
- Varronia leptoclada (Urb. & Britton) Millsp.
- Varronia leucocephala (Moric.) J.S.Mill.
- Varronia leucomalla (Taub.) Borhidi
- Varronia leucomalloides (Taroda) J.S.Mill.
- Varronia leucophlyctis (Hook.f.) Andersson
- Varronia lima Desv.
- Varronia limicola (Brandegee) Friesen
- Varronia linnaei (Stearn) J.S.Mill.
- Varronia lippioides (I.M.Johnst.) J.S.Mill.
- Varronia longipedunculata Britton & P.Wilson
- Varronia lucayana Millsp.
- Varronia macrocephala Desv.
- Varronia macrodonta (Killip) J.S.Mill.
- Varronia martinicensis Jacq.
- Varronia mayoi (Taroda) M.Stapf
- Varronia microphylla Desv.
- Varronia moensis Moldenke
- Varronia mollissima (Killip) Borhidi
- Varronia multicapitata (Britton ex Rusby) J.S.Mill.
- Varronia multispicata (Cham.) Borhidi
- Varronia munda (I.M.Johnst.) J.S.Mill.
- Varronia nashii (Urb. & Britton) Borhidi
- Varronia neowediana (A.DC.) Borhidi
- Varronia nesophila (I.M.Johnst.) Borhidi
- Varronia nipensis (Urb. & Ekman) Borhidi
- Varronia nivea (Fresen.) Borhidi
- Varronia oaxacana (A.DC.) Friesen
- Varronia oligodonta (Urb.) Borhidi
- Varronia paucidentata (Fresen.) Friesen
- Varronia pedunculosa (Griseb.) Borhidi
- Varronia perroyana (Urb. & Ekman) Borhidi
- Varronia peruviana (Roem. & Schult.) Borhidi
- Varronia picardae (Urb.) Borhidi
- Varronia podocephala (Torr.) Borhidi ex G.Campos & F.Chiang
- Varronia poliophylla (Fresen.) Borhidi
- Varronia polycephala Lam.
- Varronia polystachya (Kunth) Borhidi
- Varronia portoricensis (Spreng.) Feuillet
- Varronia revoluta (Hook.f.) Andersson
- Varronia roraimae (I.M.Johnst.) J.S.Mill.
- Varronia rosei (Killip) Borhidi
- Varronia rupicola (Urb.) Britton
- Varronia salviifolia (Juss. ex Poir.) Borhidi
- Varronia sangrinaria (Gaviria) J.S.Mill.
- Varronia sauvallei (Urb.) Borhidi
- Varronia schomburgkii (A.DC.) Borhidi
- Varronia scouleri (Hook.f.) Andersson
- Varronia selleana (Urb.) Friesen
- Varronia serrata (L.) Borhidi
- Varronia sessilifolia (Cham.) Borhidi
- Varronia setigera (I.M.Johnst.) J.S.Mill.
- Varronia shaferi Britton
- Varronia spinescens (L.) Borhidi
- Varronia stellata (Greenm.) Borhidi
- Varronia stenostachya (Killip ex Gaviria) J.S.Mill.
- Varronia steyermarkii (Gaviria) J.S.Mill.
- Varronia striata (Fresen.) Borhidi
- Varronia subtruncata (Rusby) Friesen
- Varronia suffruticosa (Borhidi) Borhidi
- Varronia toaensis (Borhidi & O.Muñiz) Borhidi
- Varronia tomentosa Lam.
- Varronia truncata (Fresen.) Borhidi
- Varronia utermarkiana (Borhidi) Borhidi
- Varronia vargasii J.S.Mill.
- Varronia vasqueziana J.S.Mill.
- Varronia wagnerorum (R.A.Howard) Borhidi
