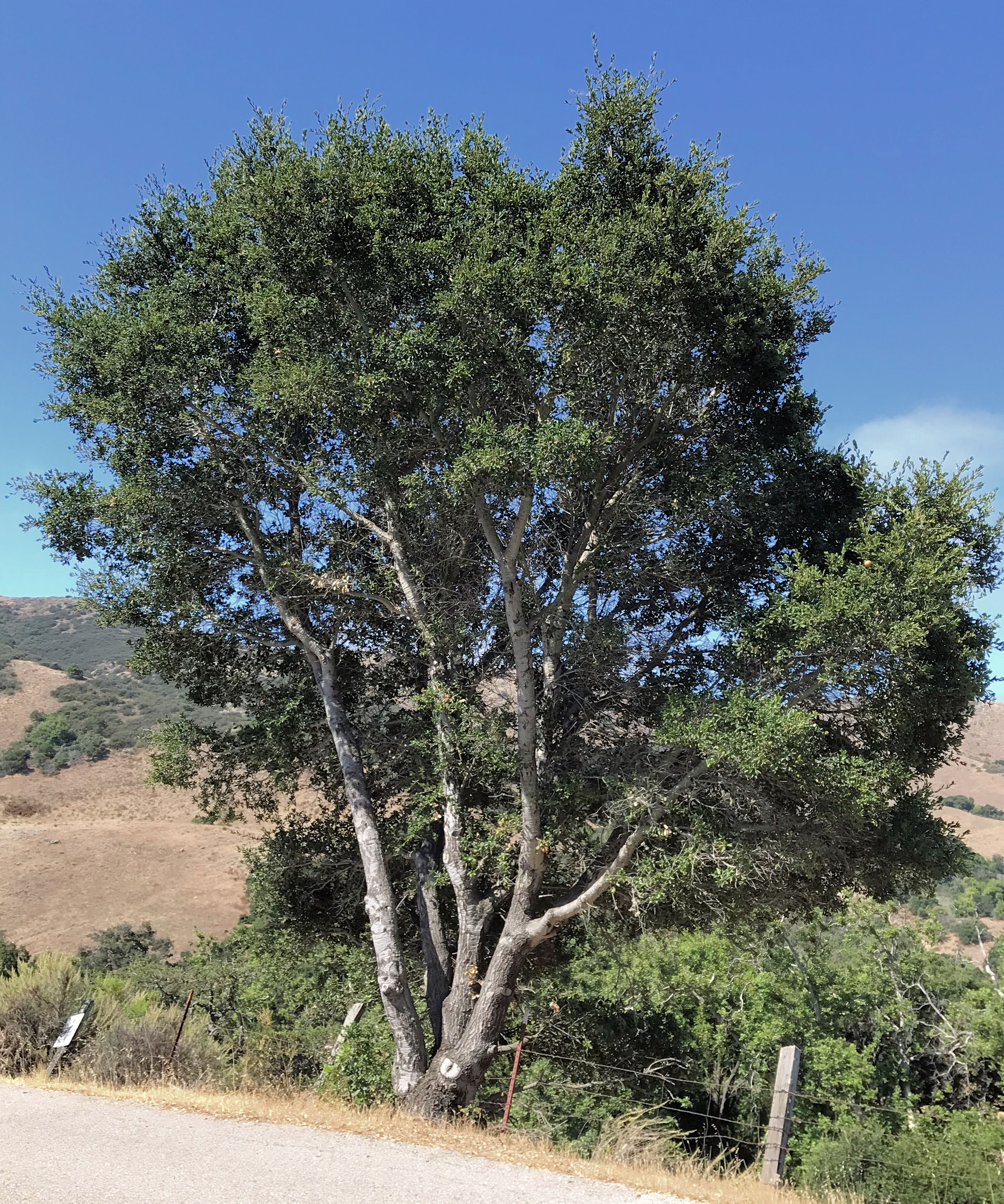
- Coast live oak in San Luis Obispo

Conservation status
- Secure (NatureServe)

- Least Concern (IUCN 3.1)

Scientific classification
- Kingdom: Plantae
- Clade: Tracheophytes
- Clade: Angiosperms
- Clade: Eudicots
- Clade: Rosids
- Order: Fagales
- Family: Fagaceae
- Genus: Quercus
- Subgenus: Quercus subg. Quercus
- Section: Quercus sect. Lobatae
- Species: Q. agrifolia

Binomial name
- Quercus agrifolia Née
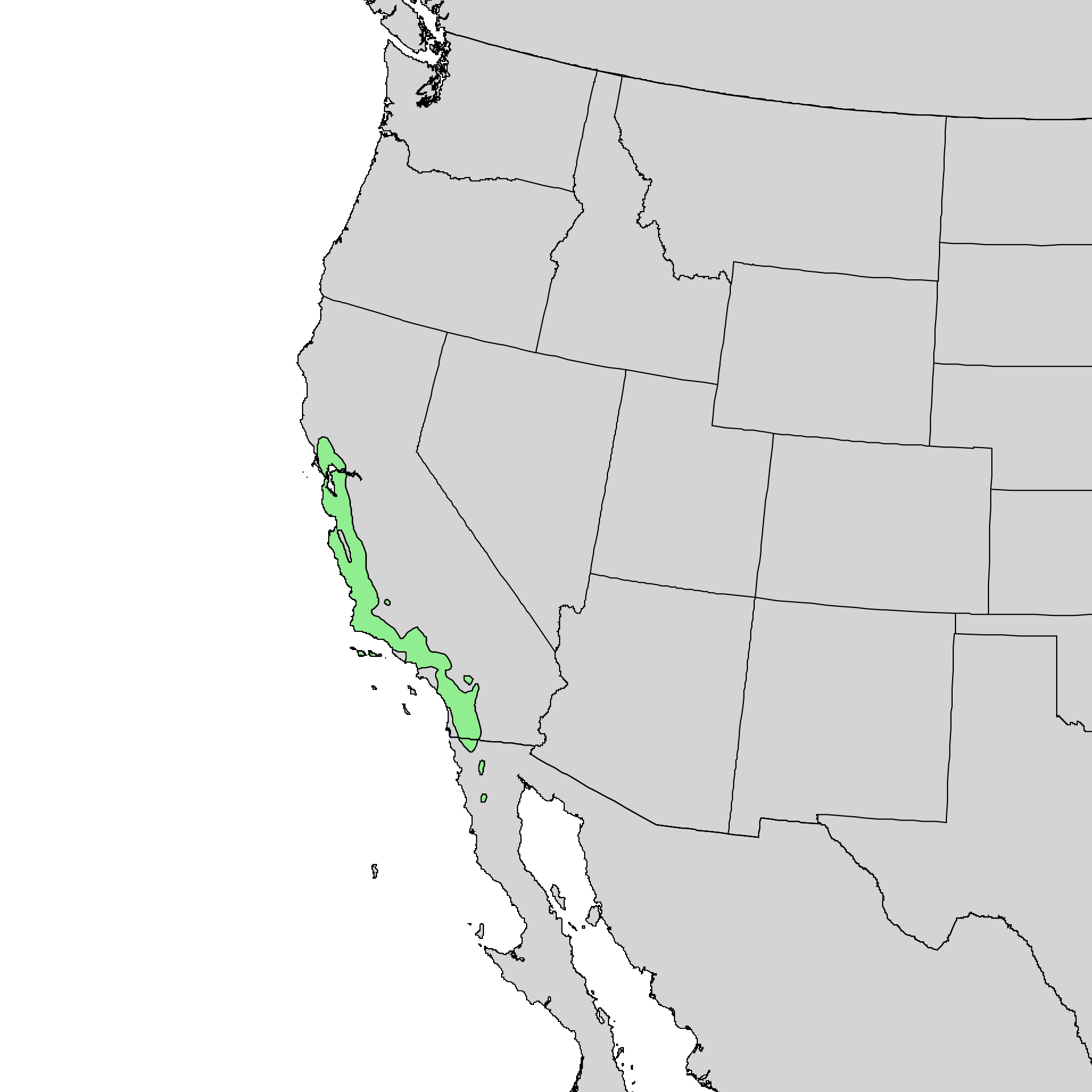
- Natural range

Synonyms
- List: Quercus acroglandis Kellogg; Quercus acutiglandis Sarg.; Quercus agrifolia var. frutescens Engelm.; Quercus agrifolia var. oxyadenia (Torr.) J.T.Howell; Quercus oxyadenia Torr.; Quercus pricei Sudw.

= Quercus agrifolia =

Coast live oak

Evergreen oak tree native to California

Quercus agrifolia, the coast live oak or California live oak, is a live oak (a semi-evergreen oak) native to the California Floristic Province. Live oaks are so-called because they keep living leaves on the tree all year, adding young leaves and shedding dead leaves simultaneously rather than dropping dead leaves en masse in the autumn like a true deciduous tree. The coast live oak may be shrubby, depending on age and growing location, but is generally a medium-sized tree. It grows west of the Sierra Nevada mountain range from Mendocino County, California, south to northern Baja California in Mexico. It is classified in the red oak section of oaks (Quercus sect. Lobatae), subsection Agrifoliae.

This species is commonly sympatric with canyon live oak (Q. chrysolepis), and the two may be hard to distinguish because their spinose leaves are superficially similar.

== Description ==
Coast live oak typically has a much-branched trunk and reaches a mature height of 10–25 meters (33–82 feet). Some specimens may attain an age exceeding 1,000 years. Examples of this include the Grand Oak of Cherry Valley, California, the Encino Oak Tree, which died in the 1990s (part of the stump has been preserved) and the Pechanga Great Oak. The tree is extremely drought-tolerant.

=== Trunk and stem ===
The trunk, particularly for older individuals, may be highly contorted, massive and gnarled. The crown is broadly rounded and dense, especially when aged 20 to 70 years; in later life the trunk and branches are more well defined and the leaf density lower. The oldest specimens might exceed 6 m (20 ft) in trunk circumference and 30 m (100 ft) in height. The bark is gray to dark-brown or black colored, with broad ridges and rounded. Twigs are brown to red-brown, measuring 1.5–3 millimeters in diameter, with scattered or uniform pubescence. Terminal buds are light chestnut-brown, oval-shaped, occasionally nearly conical, measuring 3–6 mm, and are glabrous except for cilia along scale margins.

=== Leaf ===
Leaf petioles measure 4–14 mm, rarely 18 mm, with a sparsely to densely pubescent surface. The dark green leaf blades are broadly oval, often convex in shape, with a rounded or cordate base and a blunt to attenuate apex, measuring 2–7 centimeters (3/4–2 3/4 inches) long and 1–4 cm (1/2–1 1/2 in) broad; the leaf margin is spiny-toothed (spinose), with sharp thistly fibers extending from the lateral leaf veins. The leaf surface is glabrous or with small auxiliary tufts of tomentum abaxially and raised veins; the adaxial leaf surface is convex, wrinkled, glabrous, and occasionally densely uniformly pubescent.

The outer layers of leaves are designed for maximum solar absorption, containing two to three layers of photosynthetic cells. These outer leaves are deemed to be small in size to more efficiently re-radiate the heat gained from solar capture. Shaded leaves are generally broader and thinner, having only a single layer of photosynthetic cells. The convex leaf shape may be useful for interior leaves which depend on capturing reflected light scattered in random directions from the outer canopy. The leaf shape may be also useful as condensation surfaces for "dew and mist, which would allow the tree to survive years with limited rainfall".

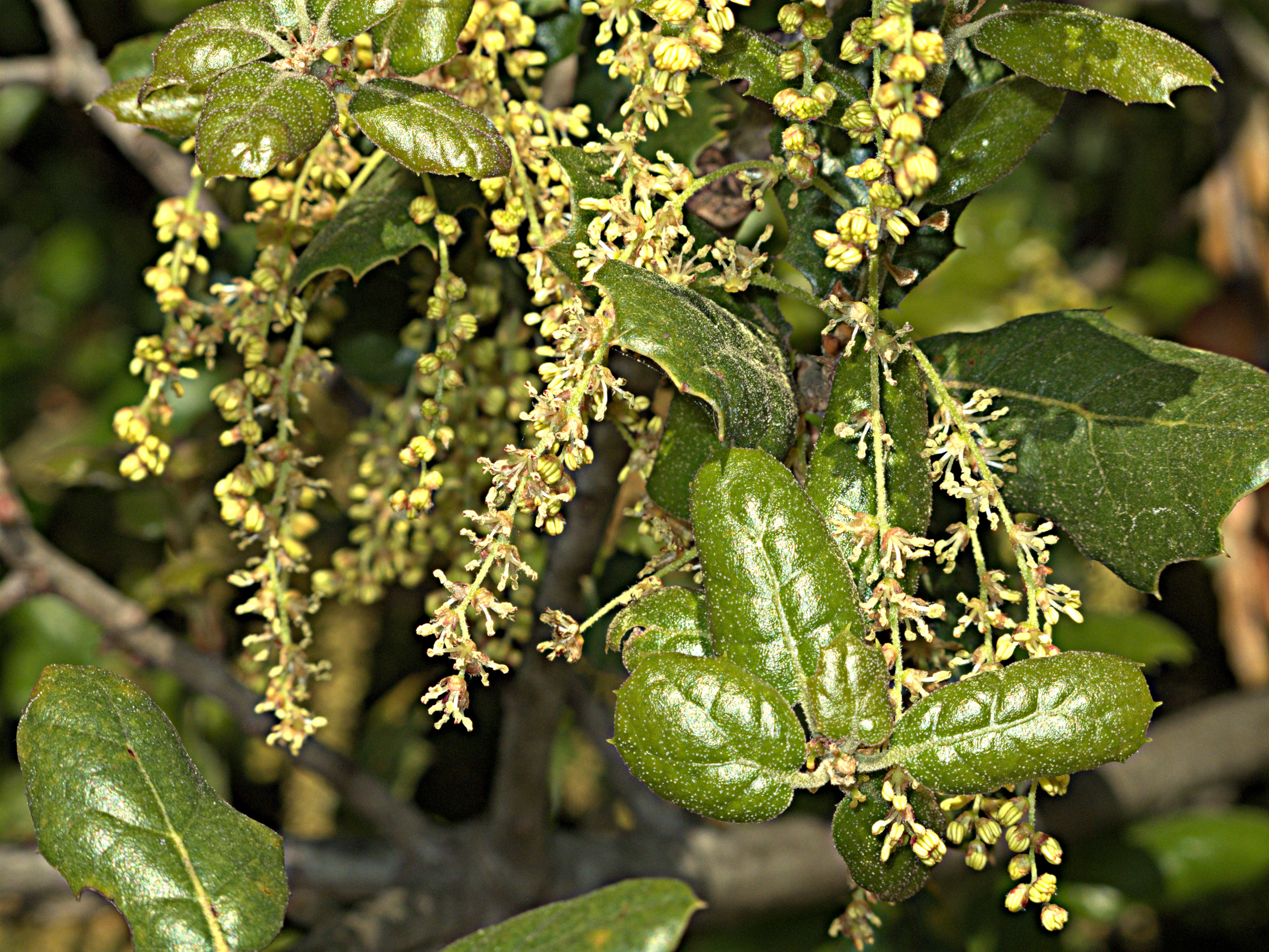
Detail of the catkins

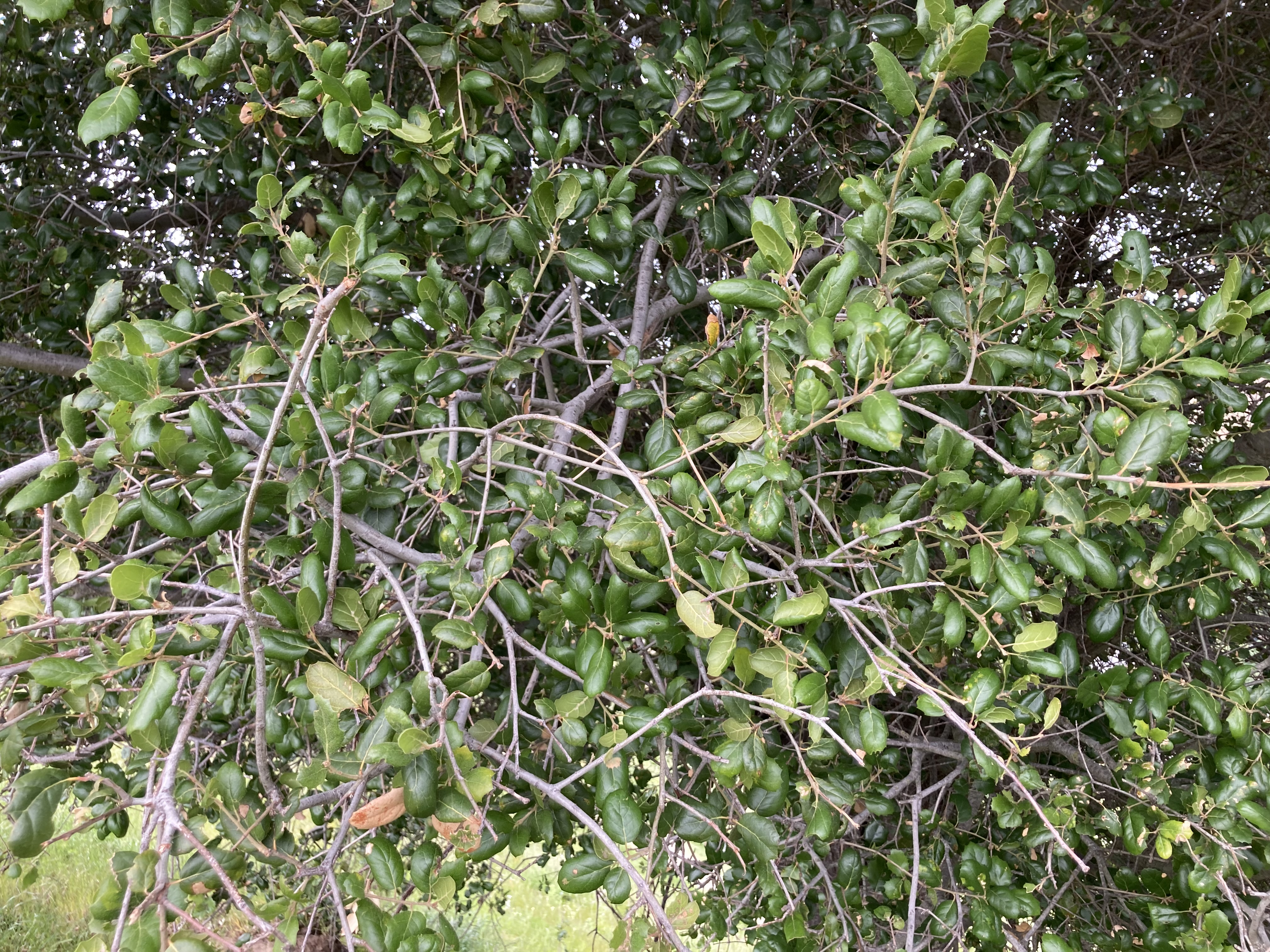
Convex, spiny leaves

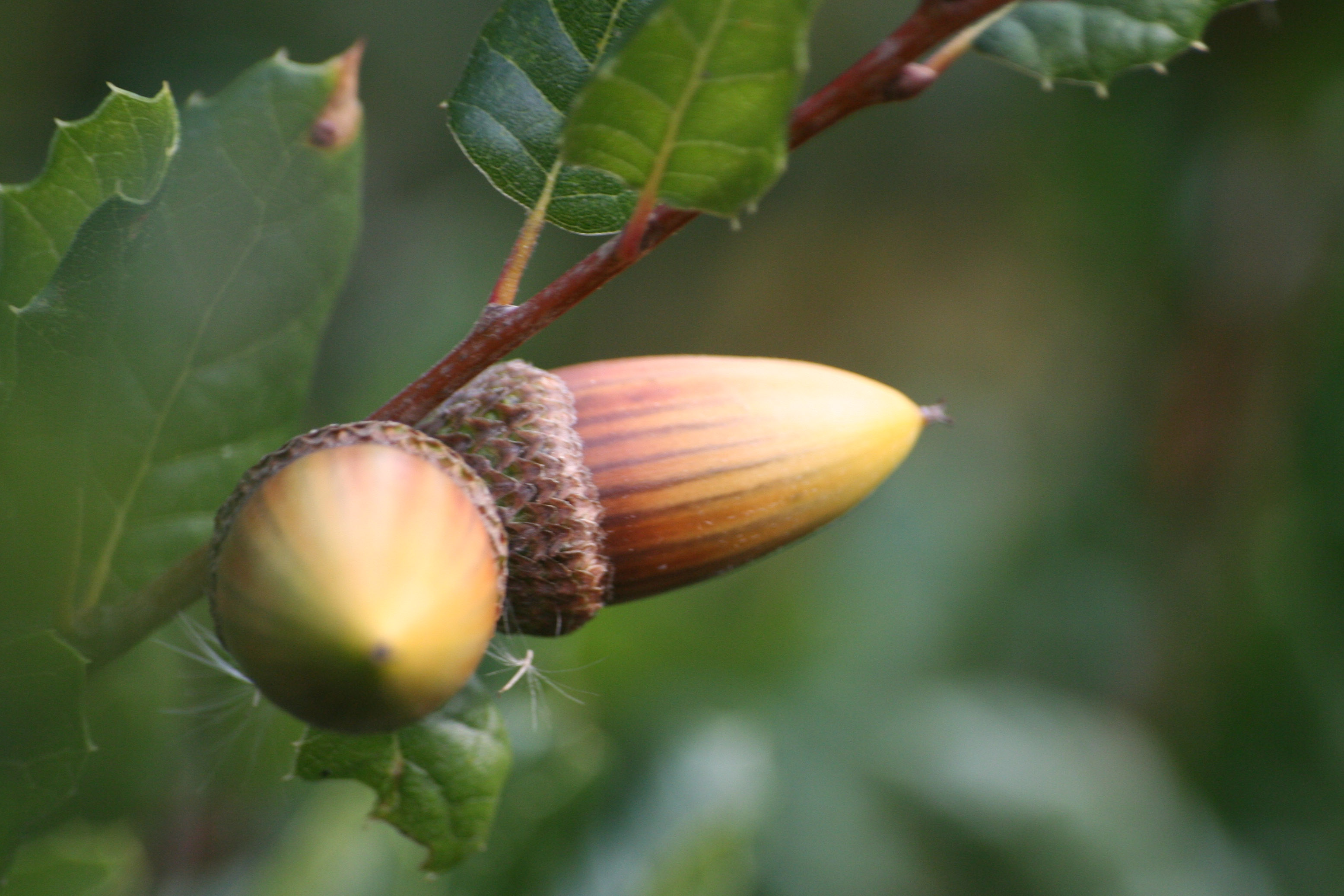
Detail of the acorns

Distinct fissured and smooth bark of a mature coast live oak

=== Flower and fruit ===
The flowers are produced in early-to-mid spring; the male flowers are pendulous catkins 5–10 cm (2–4 in) long, the female flowers inconspicuous, less than 0.5 cm (1/4 in) long, with 1–3 clustered together. Flowering occurs in early to mid spring.

The fruit is a slender reddish brown acorn 2–3.5 cm (3/4–1 1/2 in) long and 1–1.5 cm (3/8–5/8 in) broad, with the basal quarter enclosed in a cupule. The acorn cup is turbinate (beetroot-shaped) to cup or bowl shaped, rarely saucer-shaped, covering a fourth to a third, rarely half, of the nut; the cup is ovoid to oblong or conic, with a glabrous to sparsely puberulent outer surface; the inner surface is pubescent on the innermost third to uniformly pubescent, with acute scales and loose tips. The acorn nut is ovoid to oblong or conic in shape, with a glabrous surface. Unusually for a red oak, the acorns mature about 7–8 months after pollination (most red oak acorns take 18 months to mature).

== Taxonomy ==
=== Recognized varieties ===
There are two varieties of Quercus agrifolia:

Image	Scientific name	Description	Distribution
	Quercus agrifolia var. agrifolia	Leaves that are glabrous to slightly hairy on the abaxial side, especially near the leaf vein axils. Hybrids with Q. kelloggii, Q. parvula var. shevei, and Q. wislizeni are known.	Throughout the range of the species.
	Quercus agrifolia var. oxyadenia	Leaves that are tomentose abaxially, with densely interwoven hairs. It prefers granitic soils; hybrids with Q. kelloggii are known (Q. x ganderi).	Southwesternmost California (San Diego area), Baja California.

=== Hybridity ===
Several hybrids between coast live oak and other red oak species have been documented. Hybrids with interior live oak (Q. wislizenii) are known in many areas in northern California. Coast live oak also hybridizes with Shreve oak (Q. parvula var. shrevei). All these oak species show evidence of introgression with one another.

=== Etymology ===
In naming the species, Née compared it to a species illustrated in Leonard Plukenet's Phytographia under the descriptive name "Ilex folio agrifolii americana, forte agria, vel aquifolia glandifera" which Plukenet had compared, in his Almagestum botanicum, to Luigi Anguillara's Agrifolia glandifera, the noun 'Agrifolia' being a Medieval Latin form of 'Aquifolium' meaning a holly or holly-leaved oak, and related to the Modern Italian 'Agrifoglio', meaning 'holly'.

== Distribution and habitat ==
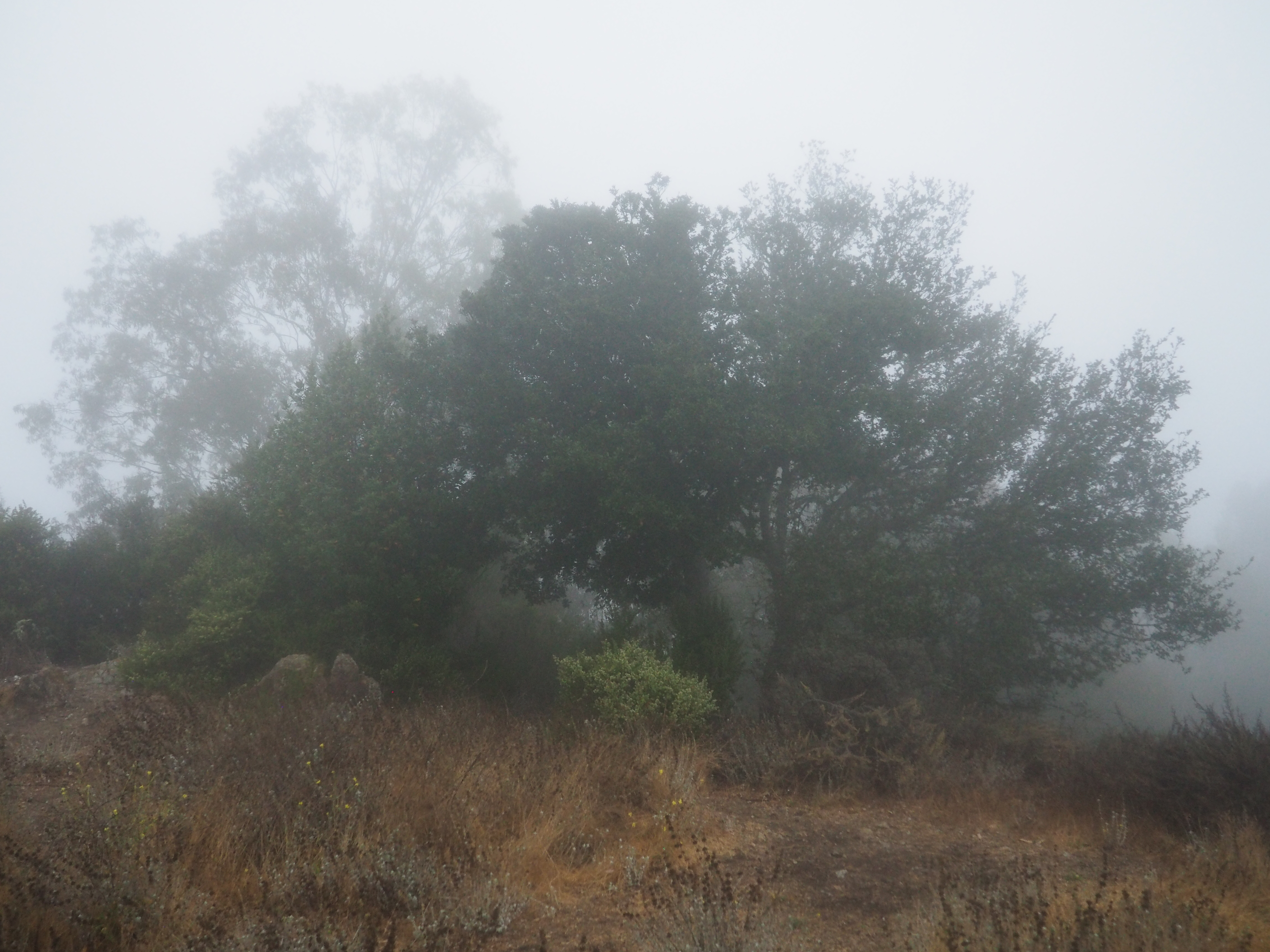
Coast Live Oak in summer fog in the Berkeley Hills.

The coast live oak is typically found within 100 km (62 mi) of the Pacific Ocean, living on coastal hills and plains and preferring soil with good drainage as well as proximity to perennial streams. It often lives in communities with other native oaks and sometimes in mixed evergreen forests. It generally prefers elevations less than 700 m (2,300 ft), but can be found as high as 1,500 m (4,900 ft) in some places. The oak typically enjoys the climate of near-coastal environments; it has a higher-than-average tolerance for airborne salinity, allowing coastal fog to make up for the lack of rain during much of the year.

== Ecology ==
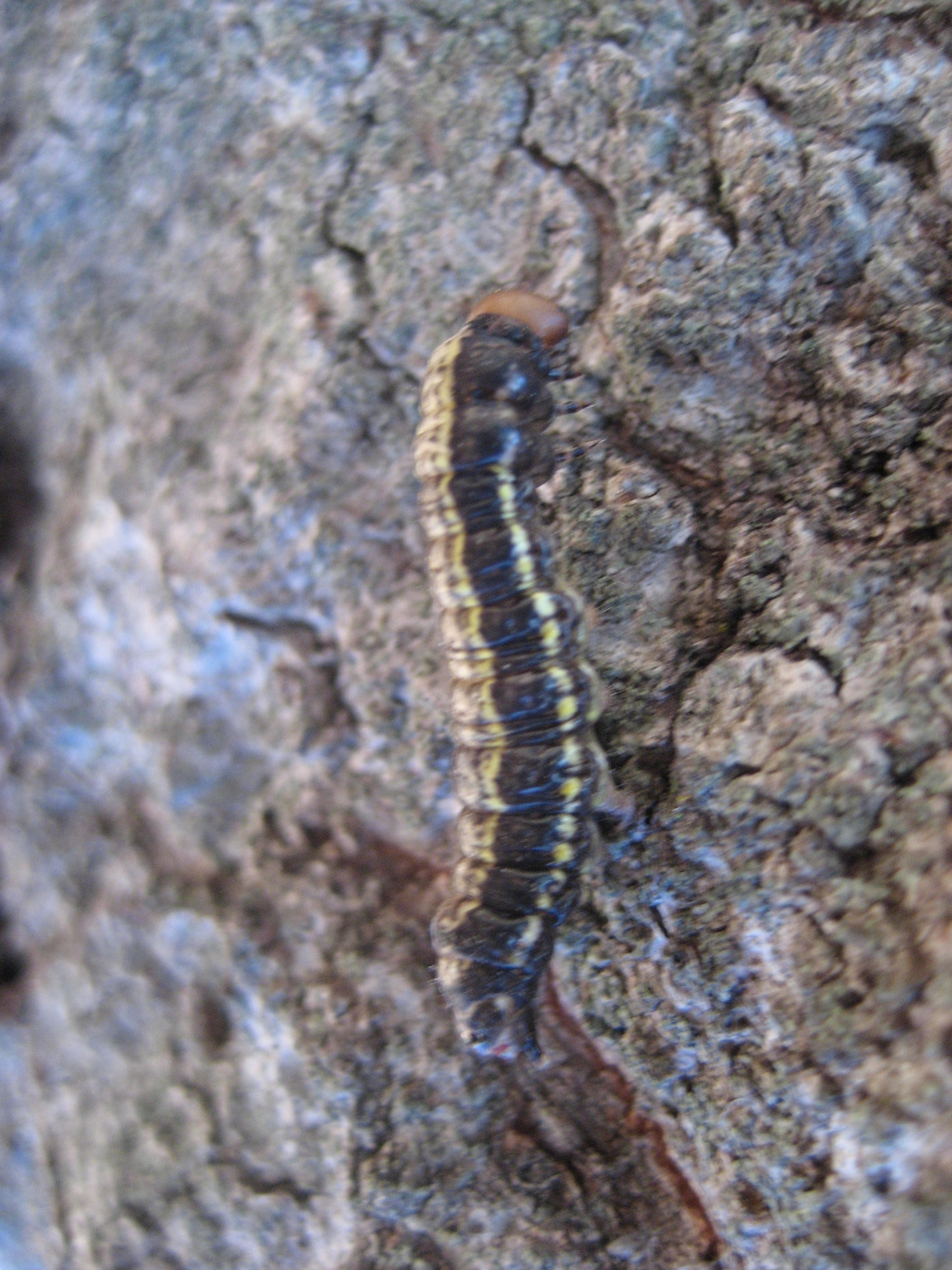
A California oak moth larva on coast live oak

Coast live oaks are the dominant tree in the woodland habitat. This habitat often contains other shrubs and vines, including toyon, California coffeeberry, California man-root, bitter gooseberry, California wild rose, Hummingbird sage, blue elderberry, and poison-oak.

The caterpillars of the California oak moth (Phryganidia californica) subsist entirely on living and fallen leaves of the coast live oak. In 8–10 year cycles, the caterpillars will appear in sufficient abundance to denude healthy trees. The trees recover, and botanists speculate that the species provide mutual benefit, possibly in the form of fertilizer for the oak. The coast live oak is one of several species of oak that is a hostplant to caterpillars of the Erynnis tristis skipper is also the only known foodplant of Chionodes vanduzeei caterpillars.

Live oak trees, among other western oaks, are also known to support acorn woodpeckers, which store their acorns in tree trunks and remove them when they want to eat.

== Allergenicity ==
The pollen of the coast live oak is a severe allergen. Pollination occurs in spring.

== Uses ==
=== Historical ===
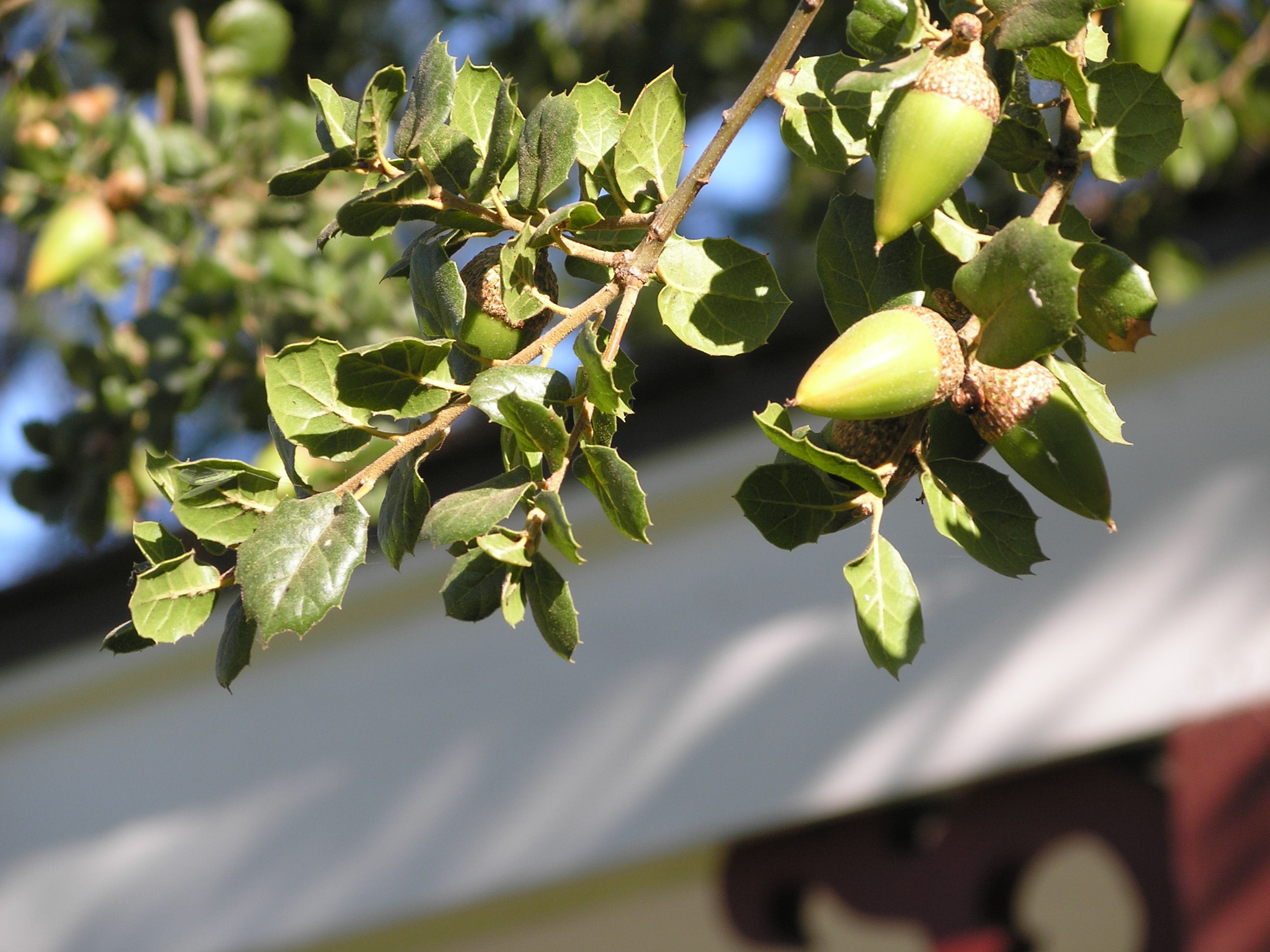
Coast live oak at Rancho Los Encinos in the San Fernando Valley

Over half of California’s Indigenous population used the acorns as a significant part of their diet. The seeds were ground into meal, which after being washed was boiled into mush or baked in ashes to make bread. A particular usefulness of the tree lies in its ability to yield acorns in winter season as well. In the 18th century, Spaniards in the San Fernando Valley used the wood for charcoal to fire kilns in making adobe. Later this form of charcoal would be utilized in the baking, gunpowder and electric power industries.

In the 18th and 19th centuries shipbuilders sought out the odd angular branches to make special joints. Pioneers moving west would harvest small amounts for making farm implements and wagon wheels, but the greatest impact was the wholesale clearing of oak woodlands to erect sprawling cities such as San Diego and San Francisco. The irregular shape often let the tree escape widespread harvest for building timbers, and also led the early settlers to endow the coast live oak with mystical qualities. Its stateliness has made it a subject of historical landscape painters throughout California modern history since the mid-19th century.

=== Modern ===
Coast live oak has also become a common addition to western US landscaping. It is however sensitive to changes in grading and drainage; in particular, it is important to respect the root crown level and avoid adding soil near the trunk when construction or landscaping occurs.

Also, if incorporating it into a landscaping scheme with artificial irrigation, it is important to avoid regular watering within the oak's drip line (canopy), since wet soil in the summer increases infection rates by soil-borne Phytophthora diseases like sudden oak death.

Santa Maria–style barbecue is grilled over coals of coast live oak.

Many Indigenous Californians still forage for these acorns as a food source when available, especially for special events. There is a growing movement across the United States for Indigenous Americans to return to their traditional diets

== Culture ==
The Spanish-speaking settlers of the Californias and their descendants referred to the coast live oak by the Spanish terms encino or encina, common names originally used for a European species of evergreen oak (Q. rotundifolia), or less commonly roble, the common Spanish term for deciduous oaks. These terms and their different forms like encinitas "little oaks", and roblar or encinal "oak grove", were used to name several land grants, communities, and geographic features across California during the Spanish colonial and Mexican eras; moreover, some of these historic names remained following the American occupation subsequent annexation of California.

Several cities derive their names from coast live oaks. The city of Encinitas near San Diego was also named after a historic land grant of the same name, its name being derived from the Cañada de los Encinos "narrow valley of the oaks." The city of Oakland, in the north range of the species, derives its name from its site in what was called the Encinal del Temescal "oak grove of the temescal." Paso Robles, whose full name El Paso de Robles "Pass of the Oaks," also derives its name from a land grant of the same name whose name referred to the ubiquitous live oaks in the region as a geographical place name.

The San Fernando Valley was originally named Valle de Santa Catalina de Bolonia de los Encinos in reference to the oaks that grew there, including many coast live oaks. Later, the first land grant in the valley was named Los Encinos. Though most of the valley's land was reserved for use by the San Fernando Mission, a portion of the grant remained in the south of the valley, where the name was preserved in the modern of Encino, Los Angeles. The modern Los Angeles community of Sherman Oaks in the valley also reflects the region's historic association with the native oak trees. In Los Angeles, native oaks became valued for their abundance, size, beauty, and historic importance, and coast live oaks are the most prominent and common species of native oaks in the city. Eventually, coast live oaks and other native oaks were officially protected by the city ordinance adopted in the 1980s. This ordinance was expanded to cover other native trees and shrubs in the 2000s.

== Bibliography ==
- Balls, Edward Kent (2020) [1962]. Early Uses of California Plants. Berkeley, California: University of California Press. ISBN 978-0-520-34306-1. OCLC 1224278823.
- C. Michael Hogan, California Arts and Sciences Institute calasinstitute.org (2023) Coast Live Oak. ed. Arthur Dawson. Encyclopedia of Earth. National Council for Science and Environment. Washington DC
- Mensing, Scott (2015). "The Paleohistory of California Oaks". Proceedings of the Seventh California Oak Symposium: Managing Oak Woodlands in a Dynamic World. 251. Berkeley, California: U.S. Department of Agriculture, Forest Service, Pacific Southwest Research Station: 35–47. Gen. Tech. Rep. PSW-GTR-251.
- Pavlik, Bruce M.; Muick, Pamela C.; Johnson, Sharon G.; Popper, Marjorie (1991). Oaks of California. Los Olivos, California: Cachuma Press. ISBN 0-9628505-1-9. Archived from the original on February 25, 2020.
- Sawyer, John O.; Keeler-Wolf, Todd (1995). A Manual of California Vegetation. California Native Plant Society. p. 241. ISBN 978-0-943460-26-0.
- Steinberg, Peter D. (2002). "Quercus agrifolia". Fire Effects Information System Online. U.S. Department of Agriculture, Forest Service, Rocky Mountain Research Station, Fire Sciences Laboratory.
