= Chionodes occidentella =

Scientific classification
- Kingdom: Animalia
- Phylum: Arthropoda
- Clade: Pancrustacea
- Class: Insecta
- Order: Lepidoptera
- Family: Gelechiidae
- Genus: Chionodes
- Species: C. occidentella

Binomial name
- Chionodes occidentella (Chambers, 1875)

Synonyms
- Gelechia occidentella Chambers, 1875; Gelechia vanduzeei Keifer, 1935

Species of moth

Chionodes occidentella is a moth in the family Gelechiidae. It is found in North America, where it has been recorded from British Columbia to California and Arizona.

The wingspan is 18-19.5 mm. The forewings are clothed with brown and ochreous, in about equal proportions. The costal basal portion is ochreous, passing into greyish-ochreous and brown on the dorsal margin, the extreme base of the costa is dark brown, the costal part of the middle of the wing is dark brown, while, on the dorsal margin, it is pale brown, and in this brown portion on the disc before the middle, are two small oblique velvety-brown streaks. Just before the cilia is a curved ochreous fascia, concave towards the base, distinct on both margins, but indistinct in the middle from the intermixture of brown scales. The apex, behind the fascia, is brown.

The larvae feed on Quercus agrifolia, Quercus douglasii, Ceanothus thyrsiflorus, Ceanothus sorediatus, Cercocarpus betuloides and Arctostaphylos patula.
