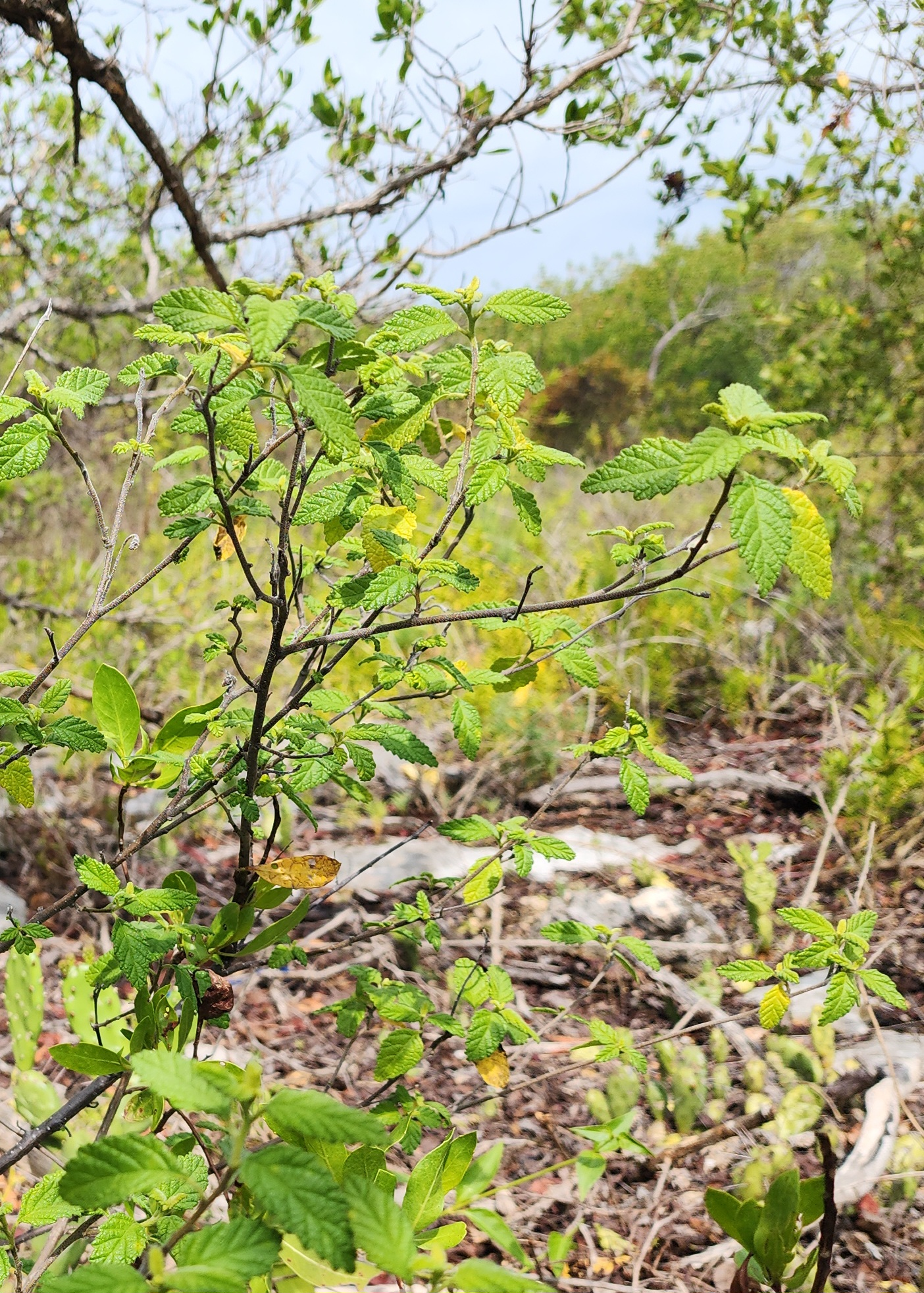
- Growing in Keys cactus barren

Scientific classification
- Kingdom: Plantae
- Clade: Tracheophytes
- Clade: Angiosperms
- Clade: Eudicots
- Clade: Asterids
- Order: Boraginales
- Family: Cordiaceae
- Genus: Varronia
- Species: V. globosa

Binomial name
- Varronia globosa Jacq.

Synonyms
- Cordia alnifolia Roem. & Schult.; Cordia bullata subsp. humilis (Jacq.) Gaviria; Cordia bullata var. globosa (Jacq.) Govaerts; Cordia dasycephala (Desv.) Kunth; Cordia globosa (Jacq.) Kunth; Cordia globosa subsp. humilis (Johnst.) Borhidi; Cordia globosa var. globosa; Cordia globosa var. humilis (Jacq.) I.M.Johnst.; Cordia humilis (Jacq.) G.Don; Cordia humilis Jacq.; Cordia jacmeliana E.H.L.Krause; Cordia parviflora Ortega; Cordia parvifolia Hemsl.; Cordia patens Miq.; Cordia patens Miq. ex Griseb.; Cordia serratifolia Cham.; Cordia sphaerocephala Willd.; Cordia sphaerocephala Willd. ex Roem. & Schult.; Lithocardium dasycephalum (Desv.) Kuntze; Lithocardium globosum (Jacq.) Kuntze; Lithocardium parviflorum (Ortega) Kuntze; Piloisa globosa (Jacq.) Raf.; Piloisia globosa (Jacq.) Raf.; Ulmarronia serratifolia (Cham.) Friesen; Varronia bullata subsp. globosa (Jacq.) Greuter & R.Rankin; Varronia bullata subsp. humilis (Jacq.) Feuillet; Varronia dasycephala Desv.; Varronia globosa subsp. humilis (Jacq.) Borhidi; Varronia humilis Jacq.; Varronia humilis var. mexicana Friesen; Varronia jacmeliana (E.H.L.Krause) Friesen; Varronia jacmeliana (K.Krause) Friesen; Varronia mexicana Friesen; Varronia sphaerocephala Willd.; Varronia sphaerocephala Willd. ex Roem. & Schult.

= Varronia globosa =

Plant

Varronia globosa is a flowering plant. An evergreen shrub it is a short-lived perennial. It is listed an endangered in Florida. It has white flowers and red berries.

In 1807, Philip Miller described it as globular-spiked varronia.

In 1974, a specimen held at the Smithsonian was collected from Northeast Brazil.

== Gallery ==
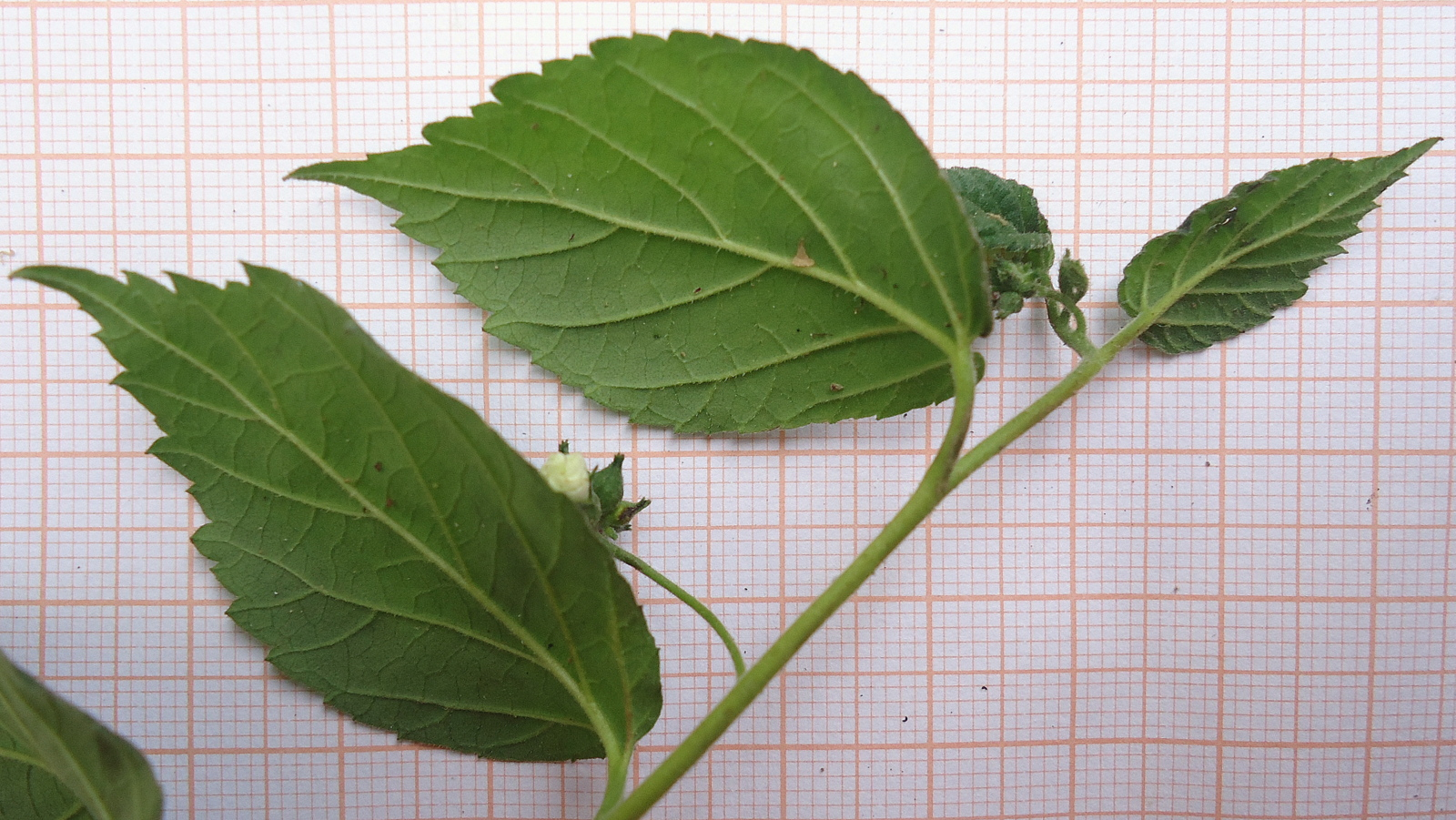
