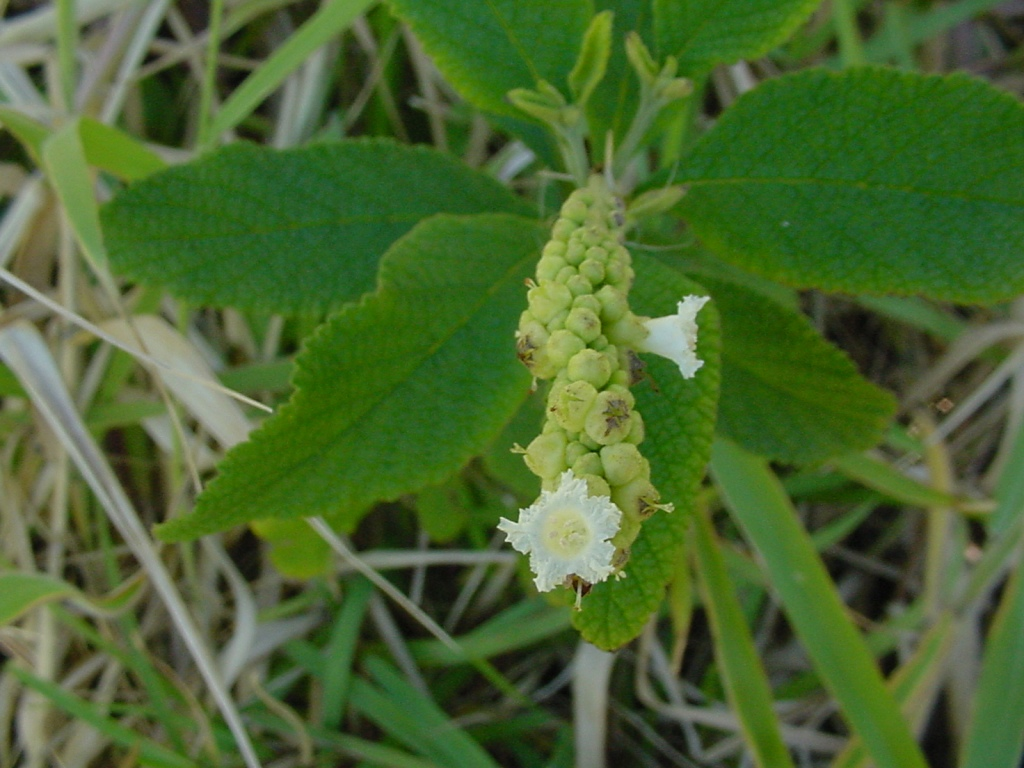

Scientific classification
- Kingdom: Plantae
- Clade: Tracheophytes
- Clade: Angiosperms
- Clade: Eudicots
- Clade: Asterids
- Order: Boraginales
- Family: Cordiaceae
- Genus: Varronia
- Species: V. curassavica

Binomial name
- Varronia curassavica Jacq.

Synonyms
- Cordia brevispicata M.Martens & Galeotti; Cordia canescens Kunth; Cordia chacoensis Chodat; Cordia chepensis Pittier; Cordia cuneiformis A.DC.; Cordia curassavica (Jacq.) Roem. & Schult.; Cordia cylindrostachya var. interrupta (A.DC.) Griseb.; Cordia divaricata Kunth; Cordia graveolens Kunth; Cordia guianensis (Desv.) Roem. & Schult.; Cordia hispida Benth.; Cordia imparilis J.F.Macbr.; Cordia interrupta A.DC.; Cordia intonsa I.M.Johnst.; Cordia linearis A.DC.; Cordia littoralis Pittier; Cordia macuirensis Dugand & I.M.Johnst.; Cordia mollis Pittier; Cordia oxyphylla A.DC.; Cordia palmeri S.Watson; Cordia peruviana var. mexicana A.DC.; Cordia rugosa Willd. ex Schult.; Cordia salicina A.DC.; Cordia socorrensis Brandegee; Cordia spicata Willd. ex Schult.; Cordia stenophylla Alain; Cordia verbenacea A.DC.; Lithocardium angustifolium Kuntze; Lithocardium brevispicatum (M.Martens & Galeotti) Kuntze; Lithocardium canescens (Kunth) Kuntze; Lithocardium cuneiforme (A.DC.) Kuntze; Lithocardium curassavicum (Jacq.) Kuntze; Lithocardium divaricatum (Kunth) Kuntze; Lithocardium hispidum (Benth.) Kuntze; Lithocardium lineare (A.DC.) Kuntze; Lithocardium macrostachyum (Jacq.) Kuntze; Lithocardium oxyphyllum (A.DC.) Kuntze; Lithocardium salicinum (A.DC.) Kuntze; Lithocardium verbenaceum (A.DC.) Kuntze; Montjolya angustifolia (H.West) Friesen; Montjolya bullata (L.) Friesen; Montjolya guianensis (Desv.) Friesen; Varronia angustifolia H.West; Varronia brevispicata (M.Martens & Galeotti) Borhidi; Varronia chacoensis (Chodat) Borhidi; Varronia cuneiformis (A.DC.) Borhidi; Varronia divaricata (Kunth) Borhidi; Varronia graveolens (Kunth) Borhidi; Varronia guianensis Desv.; Varronia interrupta (A.DC.) Borhidi; Varronia intonsa (I.M.Johnst.) J.S.Mill.; Varronia macrostachya Jacq.; Varronia oxyphylla (A.DC.) Borhidi; Varronia salicina (A.DC.) Borhidi; Varronia verbenacea (A.DC.) Borhidi

= Varronia curassavica =

Species of flowering plant

Varronia curassavica, synonym Cordia curassavica, commonly known as black sage or wild sage, is a species of flowering plant in the family Cordiaceae. It is sometimes called tropical black sage to distinguish it from another unrelated species named black sage, Salvia mellifera. It is native to tropical America but has also been widely introduced to Southeast Asia and the tropical Pacific region, where it is an invasive weed. The specific epithet is a Latinised form of Curaçao, an island in the southern Caribbean Sea region and the locality of the type collection.

== Description ==
Black sage is a many-branched shrub growing up to 3 m in height and smelling strongly of sage. Its leaves are lanceolate to ovate in shape, 40–100 mm long and 15–60 mm wide. The small white flowers grow in clusters at the ends of the branches; they have a funnel-shaped corolla, 4–6 mm long. The small, fleshy red fruits each contain a single 4–5 mm long seed.

== Sources ==
- "Cordia curassavica (Jacq.) Roem. & Schult". Flora of Australia Online. Australian Biological Resources Study. 1993. Archived from the original on 2022-01-09.
