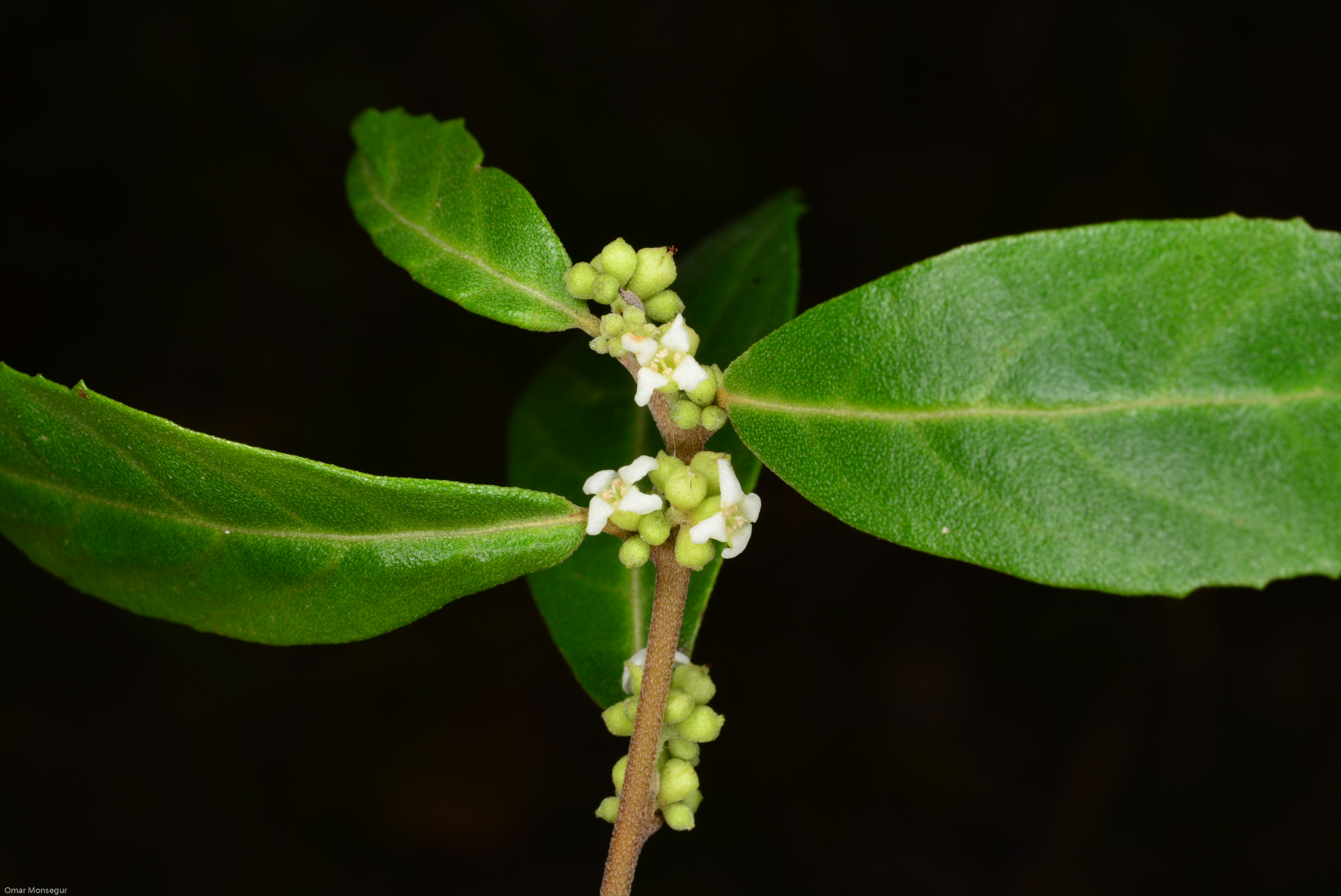
- Varronia bellonis

Scientific classification
- Kingdom: Plantae
- Clade: Tracheophytes
- Clade: Angiosperms
- Clade: Eudicots
- Clade: Asterids
- Order: Boraginales
- Family: Cordiaceae
- Genus: Varronia
- Species: V. bellonis

Binomial name
- Varronia bellonis (Urb.) Britton

= Varronia bellonis =

Species of plant

Varronia bellonis, commonly known as the serpentine manjack, is a species of flowering plant that was first reported in Susúa Puerto Rico in 1992, where a small group of five individuals was found. This endangered shrub is endemic to Puerto Rico. Due to habitat destruction, as of 1997, only 99 known plants remained in the wild, and the population of V. bellonis appeared to be in rapid decline. This discovery has spurred a reintroduction effort in Puerto Rico.

== Distribution ==
Varronia bellonis is a plant specialized in surviving on the serpentine soils of Puerto Rico. The shrub is typically found either on sunny banks along dirt roads growing in thickets of vegetation or in open saddles between limestone hills. The shrub is also known to inhabit sheer ravines and intermittent streams. Because this species is limited to specific geology types, the plant is therefore limited to an extent on the western half of the Island.

== Habitat and ecology ==
Varronia bellonis is a serpentine plant that grows in serpentine soil, mainly consisting of minerals like antigorite, lizardite, and chrysotile or white asbestos. All of which are common on the volcanic island of Puerto Rico. The Maricao forest soils are primarily serpentine. This species of shrub exists at elevations ranges between 150 and 875 meters (492 and 2,871 ft) V. bellonis is also found in regions with average annual rainfall between 1,339 and 2,606 mm (52.7 and 102.6 in) of rain during the rainy season, as well as a relatively dry season occurring between December through March. The average temperature ranges 21.7–25.5 °C (71.1–77.9 °F). In addition to the Maricao forest, the Río Abajo State Forest and the Susua State forest have shown to be sanctuaries for the ideal growth of this endangered shrub.

== Morphology ==
Individuals of this species are arching to erect shrub of about 1–2 m (3.3–6.6 ft) high The shrub is composed of long slender twigs with short hairs lining the twigs. The leaves of the shrub are alternate in pattern, oblong in shape, and 2–6 cm (0.79–2.4 in) in length, and roughly 2.5 to 3 times longer than wide. This is also a flowering species of shrub. The fruit of this plant is a pointed drupe, 5 millimeters in length. The white axillary flowers are unisexual and the plants are either male or female. The fruit is a drupe that turns red when ripe. The fruit usually develops between November and February.

== Conservation ==
This species is under constant threat from habitat destruction and modification, forest management practices, and restricted distribution. For example, in 1994, 82 percent of the individuals known to exist in the Rıo Abajo Commonwealth Forest were removed from the forest for the construction of a highway. In 1995, an additional twenty plants were destroyed by clearing for road reconstruction. This habitat destruction in combination with the requirement for adequate numbers of both male and female plants in a viable population are limiting factors for the species. In an effort to help limit potential threats to the species, it was placed on the endangered species list in order to protect viable habitat as well as ascertain money for research.

== Recovery recommendations ==
Improving the protection and Safeguarding of the remaining population will help maintain the species range and size of the current population as well as ensure the population can grow. Special attention should be given to individual plants alongside roads and trails because roadside vegetation management (like brush cutting) could readily extinguish these populations.

Improving propagation and reintroduction efforts can also help deter the decline of the species. However, these tactics are dependent on a number of factors. Seed sources and availability, seed collection and storage techniques, propagation methods and rearing duration, and the number of individuals to be reintroduced all play a role in the effectiveness of reintroduction efforts. Locations within and around the towns of Maricao as well as in Río Abajo, Susúa, and Ciales should provide suitable habitats for reintroduction. This is evident by the fact that these areas make up much of the species' original habitat range.

Despite protected status as an endangered species, V. bellonis could become extinct in the near future. Upgrading the status of the species to critically endangered could aid updated recovery plans in protecting the species.
