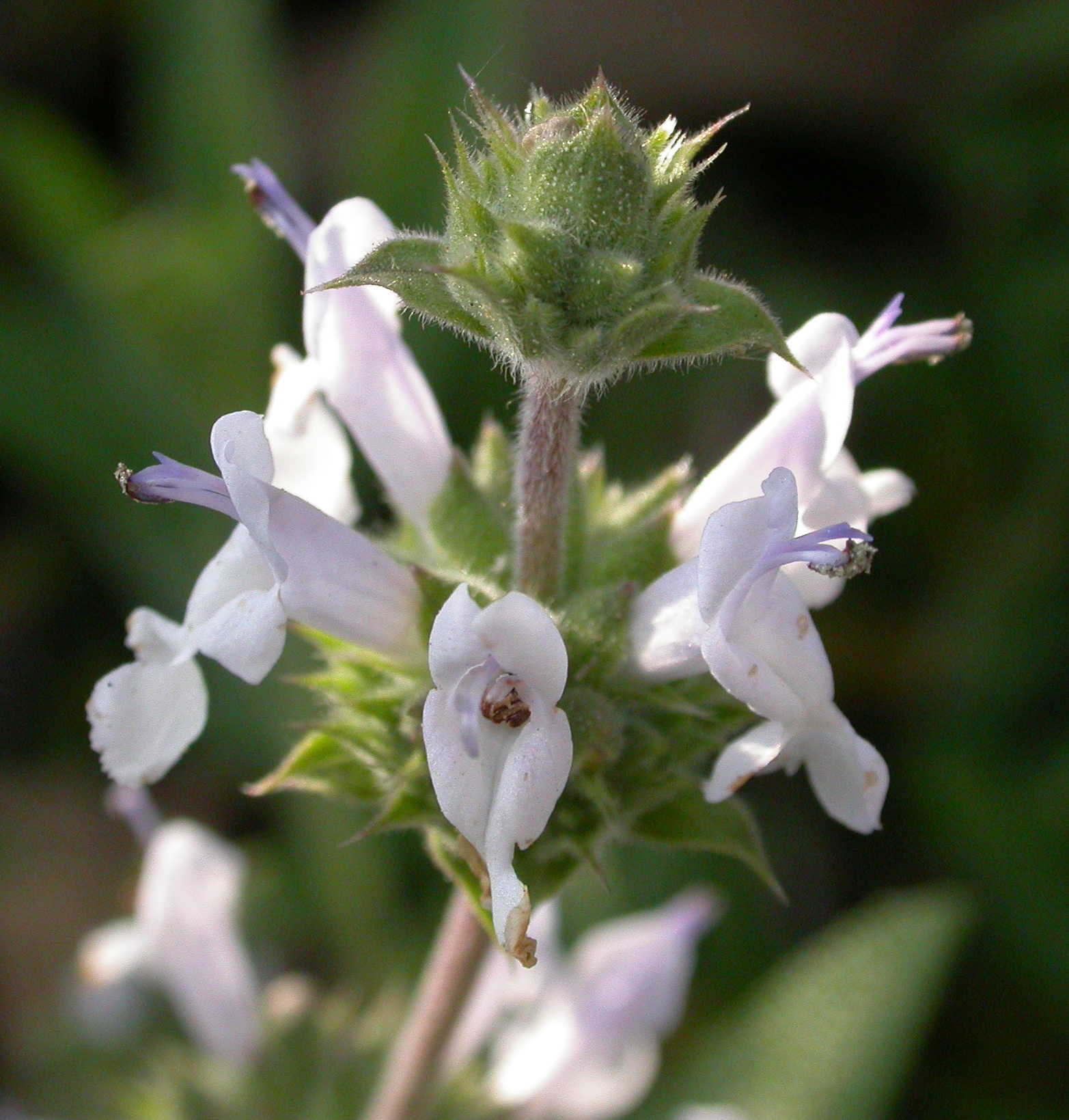

Scientific classification
- Kingdom: Plantae
- Clade: Tracheophytes
- Clade: Angiosperms
- Clade: Eudicots
- Clade: Asterids
- Order: Lamiales
- Family: Lamiaceae
- Genus: Salvia
- Species: S. mellifera

Binomial name
- Salvia mellifera Greene

Synonyms
- Ramona stachyoides

= Salvia mellifera =

Species of shrub

Salvia mellifera (Californian black sage, also known as seel by the Mahuna) is a small, highly aromatic, evergreen shrub of the genus Salvia (the sages) native to California, and Baja California, Mexico. It is common in the coastal sage scrub of Southern California and northern Baja California. Black sage has a dark resinous appearance and releases a strong herbal scent when it is touched. This is especially apparent in dry seasons.

== Description ==
Californian black sage is a perennial shrub that grows approximately 1–2 meters (3.3–6.6 ft) tall. It is covered with simple hairs with some glandular hairs, which makes it highly aromatic. The leaves are oblong-elliptic to obovate in shape and are about 2.5–7 cm (0.98–2.76 in) long. The upper surface of the leaf is somewhat glabrous, while the lower surface of the leaf is hairy.

The inflorescence occurs in 1.6–4 cm (0.63–1.57 in) wide clusters. The flowers are usually a pale blue or lavender color, and rarely a pale rose color. The upper lip of the flower is 2-lobed. The style and stamens are slightly exserted. The fruit produced by the black sage is a schizocarp composed of four 2–3 mm (0.079–0.118 in) brown nutlets. The plant blooms from March to June usually, attracting native bees, butterflies, and hummingbirds. These interactions play a vital role in pollination networks.

== Ecology ==
Californian black sage grows in the coastal sage scrub and lower chaparral plant communities. It occurs from sea level to 1,200 m (3,900 ft) elevation. Black sage is able to grow on a variety of different soils, including sandstone, shale, granite, serpentinite, and gabbro or basalt. It is semi-deciduous, depending on the location and severity of drought, shallow rooted, and drought tolerant by leaf curling rather than drought-avoiding through leaf drop.

Black sage readily hybridizes with three other coastal scrub Salvias: Salvia apiana (Californian white sage), Salvia leucophylla (San Luis purple sage), and Salvia clevelandii. It rarely hybridizes with the annuals Salvia columbariae and Salvia carduacea.

== Production and lifespan ==
Salvia mellifera is a rather slow growing shrub that reaches maturity in around 3 to 5 years of life. It can live much longer in the right conditions however. This plant also produces an abundance of seeds that are dispersed around the area by wind, aiding its spread. The general lifespan of Salvia mellifera can possibly extend for several decades, but depends on water availability and conditions of the surrounding area. Salvia mellifera usually blooms in late winter to early spring. Its peak flowering usually occurs from March to May. Throughout its life cycle, it produces aromatic flowers that attract pollinators, leading to reproductive success. Its ability to reproduce through seed dispersion and root sprouting allows it thrive in the coastal sage scrub ecosystem.

== Fire response ==
Salvia mellifera, like many species in this ecosystem, has evolved certain mechanisms to withstand fires. This plant has a deep-root system, allowing it resprout after being burned. Its ability to seemingly regenerate after fires highlights its ability to withstand these fire-prone climates. Additionally, black sage's have aromatic oils and resinous glands that provide some fire resistance by preventing ignition due to that plant. The recovery of Salvia mellifera after fire plays a crucial role in maintaining the structure and biodiversity of coastal sage scrub communities.

== Traditional use ==
The Chumash people used a strong sun tea of the leaves and stems of the plant. This was rubbed on the painful area or used to soak one's feet. The plant contains diterpenoids, such as aethiopinone and ursolic acid, that are pain relievers.In addition to medicinal purposes, black sage is often used in native plant restoration projects to stabilize soil and support those same pollination networks mentioned in "description".

Californian black sage also produces a nectar that black sage honey is made from. This honey is typically peppery and strong, and is prized as a rare honey due to the plant's dry climate. Black sage honey can only be made when specific rain conditions are met and the plant produces enough nectar.

== See also ==
- California chaparral and woodlands
