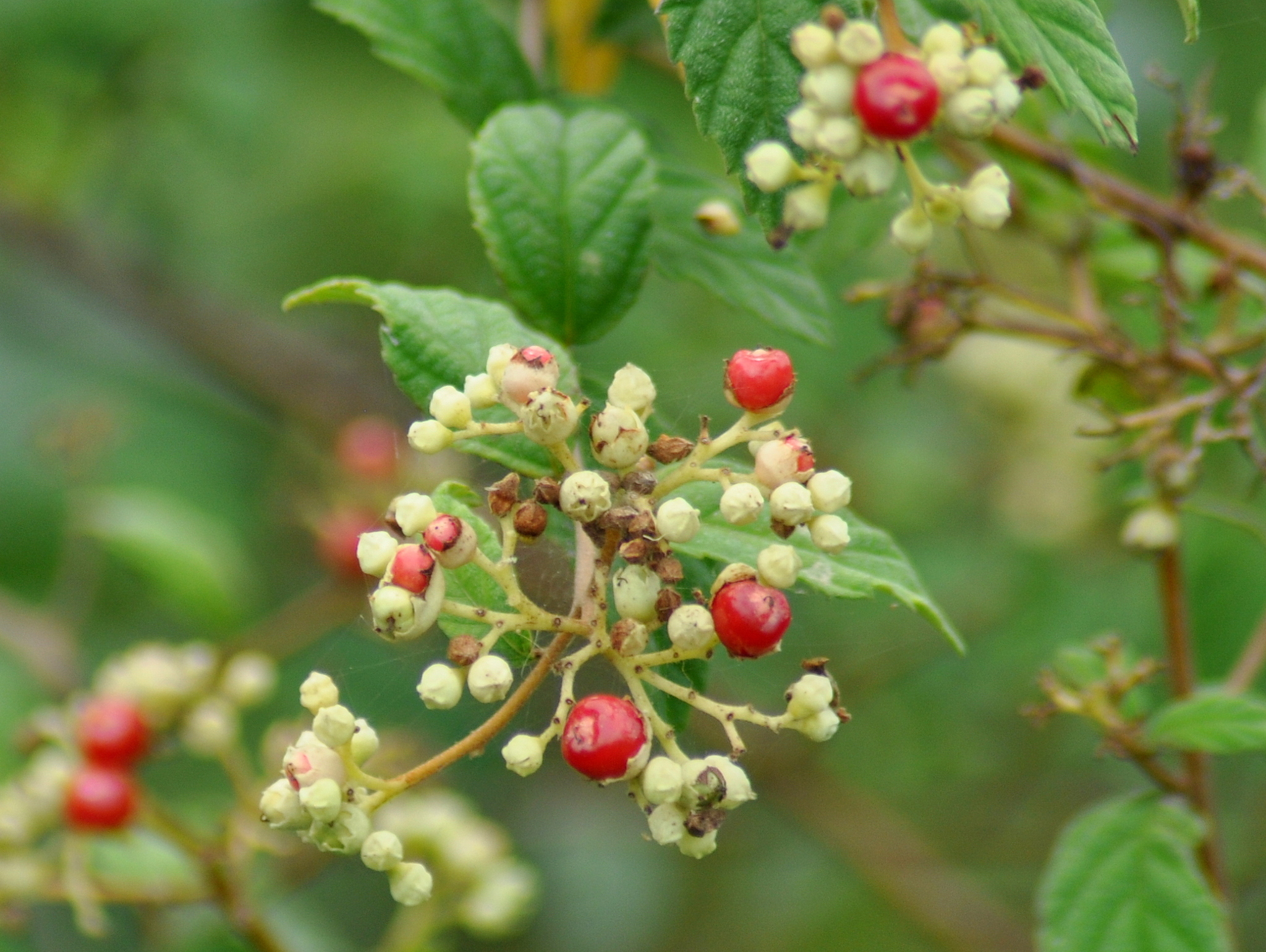
- In Brazil

Conservation status
- Least Concern (IUCN 3.1)

Scientific classification
- Kingdom: Plantae
- Clade: Tracheophytes
- Clade: Angiosperms
- Clade: Eudicots
- Clade: Asterids
- Order: Boraginales
- Family: Cordiaceae
- Genus: Varronia
- Species: V. polycephala

Binomial name
- Varronia polycephala Lam.

Synonyms
- Cordia adnata A.DC.; Cordia boliviana Gand.; Cordia corymbosa f. intonsa I.M.Johnst.; Cordia guazumifolia (Desv.) Roem. & Schult.; Cordia hermanniifolia Cham.; Cordia lapensis Warm.; Cordia mariquitensis Kunth; Cordia monosperma (Jacq.) Roem. & Schult.; Cordia paraguariensis Chodat & Hassl.; Cordia patens Kunth; Cordia polycephala (Lam.) I.M.Johnst.; Cordia salzmannii A.DC.; Cordia salzmannii Benth. ex Griseb.; Cordia sulfurata E.H.L.Krause; Cordia ulmifolia Spreng.; Cordia urticifolia Cham.; Cordia wickstroemii Steud.; Cordiopsis monosperma (Jacq.) Ham. ex Heynh.; Lithocardium adnatum (A.DC.) Kuntze; Lithocardium guazumifolium Kuntze; Lithocardium mariquitense (Kunth) Kuntze; Ulmarronia corymbosa (L.) Friesen; Ulmarronia mariquitensis (Kunth) Friesen; Ulmarronia patens (Kunth) Friesen; Varronia boliviana (Gand.) Borhidi; Varronia guazumifolia Desv.; Varronia hermanniifolia (Cham.) Borhidi; Varronia monosperma Jacq.; Varronia paniculata Wikstr.; Varronia paraguariensis (Chodat & Hassl.) Borhidi; Varronia patens (Kunth) Borhidi; Varronia ulmifolia Juss. ex Dum.Cours.; Varronia urticifolia (Cham.) J.S.Mill.

= Varronia polycephala =

Species of flowering plant

Varronia polycephala, synonym Cordia polycephala, is a native plant of the Americas that is commonly found in open distributed areas. The flowers are sessile and the inflorescences are simple or branched. Fruits are usually bright red and 3-4 millimeters in diameter, covered by an enlarged calyx.

== Usage ==
The stems are known to be gathered from its habitat, which are marsh forests along creeks and rivers near the coast, and used as tooth cleaners. The fruits are known to be edible and they consist of a layer of pulpy, sweetish flesh surrounding a single seed.

== Common name ==
Varronia polycephala is also known as black-sage.

== Distribution ==
Varronia polycephala has a distribution in tropical forests of the Americas. It is native to Haiti, the Dominican Republic, Puerto Rico, the Virgin Islands, the Lesser Antilles, Colombia, Venezuela, Guyana, Suriname, Ecuador, Peru, Brazil, Bolivia, Paraguay and Argentina.

== Conservation ==
This species can be found in protected areas throughout its range of the Lesser Antilles and South America. In Puerto Rico it is found in public forests, such as Maricao, Ro Abajo, and Cambalache. It is also found in the Virgin Islands National Park and Sage Mountain National Park on the island of Tortola.
