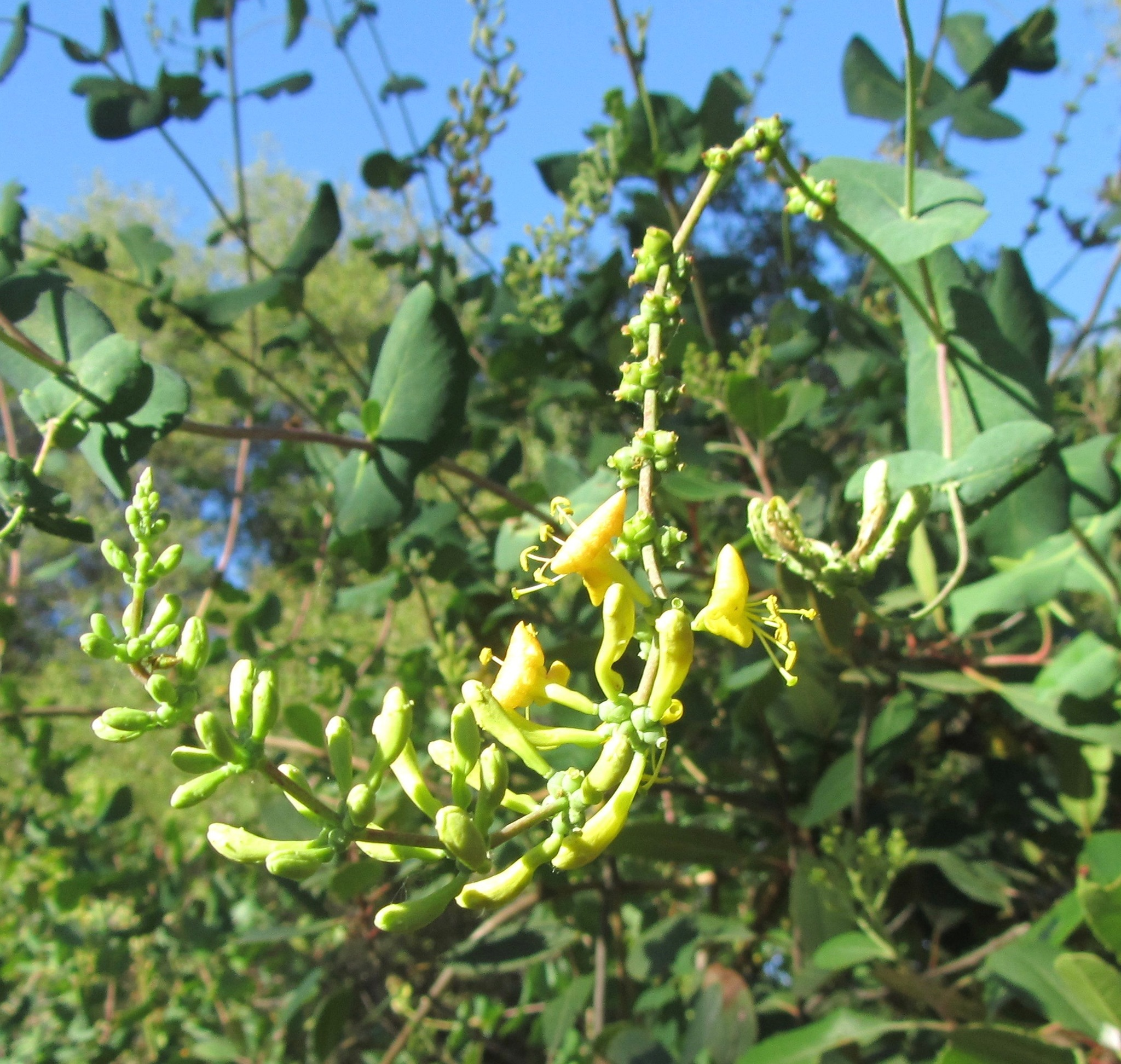

Scientific classification
- Kingdom: Plantae
- Clade: Tracheophytes
- Clade: Angiosperms
- Clade: Eudicots
- Clade: Asterids
- Order: Dipsacales
- Family: Caprifoliaceae
- Genus: Lonicera
- Species: L. interrupta

Binomial name
- Lonicera interrupta Benth.

= Lonicera interrupta =

Chaparral honeysuckle

Species of honeysuckle

Lonicera interrupta, commonly known as chaparral honeysuckle, is a species of plant found in the western United States.

== Description ==
Lonicera interrupta is a shrub with a woody trunk. The leaves are up to 3.5 centimetres (1 1/2 in) long. The plant sends up spiked inflorescences of yellow honeysuckle flowers. Each flower is about 1 centimetre (1/2 in) long, with prominent stamens extending from the rolled-back lips.

The fruits are red, spherical, and shiny.

== Distribution and habitat ==
It is native to chaparral and mixed forest habitats in the foothills and mountain ranges of California, and to some mountains in Arizona.

It is hardy and quite drought-tolerant.

== Ecology ==
The flowers are attractive to hummingbirds.

== Uses ==
The fruits are bitter but edible, unlike many members of the genus.
