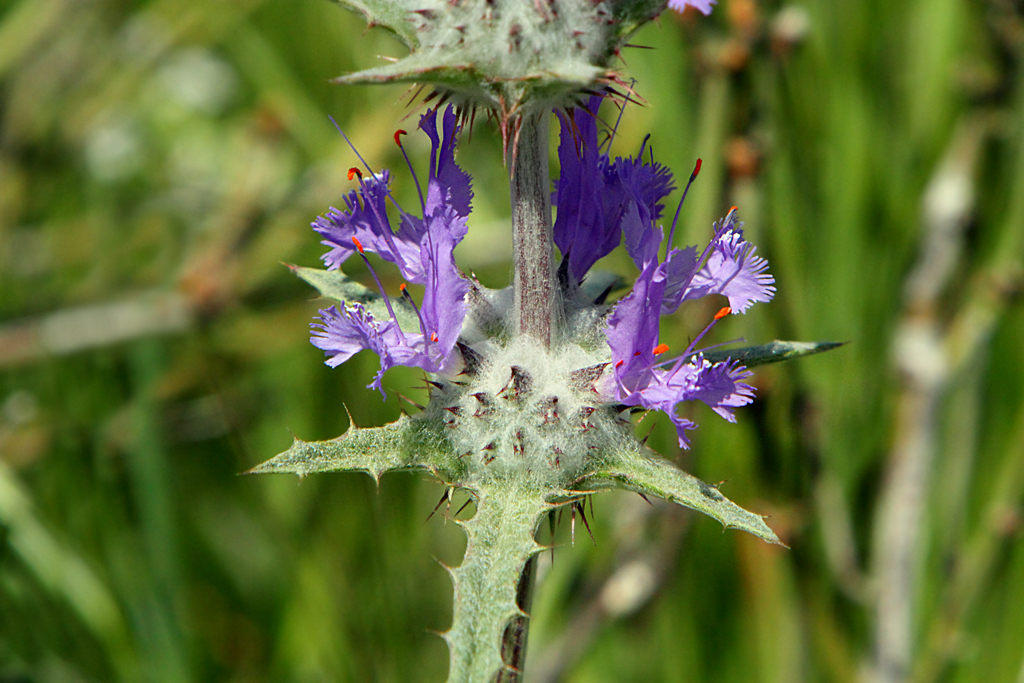

Scientific classification
- Kingdom: Plantae
- Clade: Tracheophytes
- Clade: Angiosperms
- Clade: Eudicots
- Clade: Asterids
- Order: Lamiales
- Family: Lamiaceae
- Genus: Salvia
- Species: S. carduacea

Binomial name
- Salvia carduacea Benth.

= Salvia carduacea =

Species of shrub

Salvia carduacea, the thistle sage, is an annual herb native to California and Baja California, found up to 1400 m elevation. It responds drastically to its environment, growing anywhere from 15 cm to 1 m in height. The wooly white basal leaves resemble a thistle's, with long spines, while the flowers grow in whorls on calyces that are wooly and spiny. The flowers are a vibrant lavender with bright orange anthers. The foliage is pungent, with a scent similar to citronella.
