= Hummingbird sage =

Hummingbird sage is a common name for two different species of sage:

- Salvia guaranitica, native to South America
- Salvia spathacea, native to California
