= Aldwych Farcical =

Aldwych Farcical is a term coined by the artist and author Osbert Lancaster for a style of English interior design fashionable in the 1920s and 1930s. Lancaster devoted a chapter of his 1939 book Homes Sweet Homes to the style, taking the name from the popular series of farces starring Tom Walls and Ralph Lynn at the Aldwych Theatre in London. Plays in the series, including Rookery Nook, Thark and Plunder, were set in houses built and decorated in faux-antique rustic style, mostly on the fringes of London. Along with other terms coined by Lancaster, Aldwych Farcical has entered the language and is recorded in the Oxford English Dictionary.

== Background ==
=== Aldwych farces ===
Rookery Nook, Aldwych Theatre, 1926: from left Tom Walls, Ralph Lynn, Stella Bonheur and Ena Mason

Between 1923 and 1933 the actor-manager Tom Walls presented a series of twelve farces at the Aldwych Theatre in the West End of London, co-starring with the comedy actor Ralph Lynn. Most of the plays were written by Ben Travers, and revolved around a series of preposterous incidents involving a misunderstanding, borrowed clothes and lost trousers, and featuring the worldly Walls character, the innocent yet cheeky Lynn, the put-upon Robertson Hare, the beefy, domineering Mary Brough, the lean, domineering Ethel Coleridge, and the ingénue Winifred Shotter. The theatre historian Ronald Strang writes that the farces were "Loosely plotted around the suspicion of sexual improprieties, but enlivened by Travers's playful language, eccentric characters and deft routines". Strang adds that the plays enjoyed "accumulated popular goodwill and an almost legendary theatrical status".

Some of the most popular plays in the series, including Thark and Plunder, were set in houses built in rustic style on the fringes of London, in locations such as Horsham and Walton Heath, or sometimes, as in Rookery Nook, further away. In The Cambridge Illustrated History of British Theatre (2000), Simon Trussler writes of "incipient tumult fed by a commodious stairway and lots of practical entrances ... characteristic of a genre whose no less incipient (but usually just avoided) combination of social and sexual disasters Coward had also exploited in Hay Fever (1924)".

=== Homes Sweet Homes ===
In 1938 the artist, cartoonist and author Osbert Lancaster had a critical and popular success with his book Pillar to Post, in which he drew and commented on building styles from ancient times to the present day. The tone was light and humorous but Lancaster's purpose was serious: to encourage readers to appreciate the best architecture and reject the worst. He followed this in 1939 with Homes Sweet Homes, which focused on the interiors of old and new buildings. He became known for coining terms for architectural styles. In Pillar to Post he either invented or popularised "Pont Street Dutch", "Stockbrokers Tudor" and "By-pass Variegated"; for Homes Sweet Homes he added, in addition to "Aldwych Farcical", "Curzon Street Baroque" and an interior version of "Stockbrokers Tudor".

In 1959 Lancaster published Here, of All Places, which combined most of Pillar to Post and all of Homes Sweet Homes, with additional text and drawings. Some drawings were redone for the new book but Aldwych Farcical was retained with the original text and drawing unchanged.

== Style ==
"A wealth of old oak panelling ... long lines of sporting prints, punctuated here and there by a barometer or a warming-pan": Lancaster's illustration of "Aldwych Farcical", showing the features discussed in Homes Sweet Homes and by the historian Clive Aslet

The Oxford English Dictionary defines the term as "Of or relating to an Aldwych farce ... designating a type of architecture or interior design resembling the upper-middle-class domestic setting of this genre". Lancaster wrote of Aldwych Farcical:

[T]he country-house atmosphere is even more overwhelming within than without. Here the lounge-hall reaches the ultimate peak of its development. From an impressive landing, always referred to as the gallery, a flight of polished oak stairs lead down to a gleaming parquet sea on which float a variety of rich Turkey rugs. Light and air, the former in small quantities, the latter in unlimited supplies, are admitted through a bewildering selection of doors and French windows which one constantly expects (such is the theatrical complexity of their arrangement) to fly open and reveal the pyjama-clad forms of Mr Robertson Hare or Mr Ralph Lynn. On the walls, or rather such part of them as is not covered by a wealth of old oak panelling, hang long lines of sporting prints, punctuated here and there by a barometer or a warming-pan, testifying to the strong sporting instincts of the squirearchy of Metroland.

The lounge-hall to which Lancaster refers was typical of the style. In The Last Country Houses Clive Aslet writes, "The informality and half-timbered cosiness suited an upper middle-class ideal". He quotes Travers's description of the setting of Rookery Nook:

The front door gives entrance to spacious hall, suited to additional living room and containing fine old open fireplace in Jacobean style with rich oak overmantel. Parquet flooring, valuable Turkey matting, oak-panelled walling and mullioned windowing.

The historian Rosemary Hill suggests that Lancaster was taking a swipe at the architect Augustus Pugin, whose house in Ramsgate "reinvented the Gothic as a new style for the nineteenth century ... the prototype for hundreds of country rectories and suburban houses".

== Sources ==
- Aslet, Clive (1982). The Last Country Houses. New Haven: Yale University Press. ISBN 9780300029048.
- Boston, Richard (1989). Osbert: A Portrait of Osbert Lancaster. London: Collins. ISBN 978-0-00-216324-8.
- Hill, Rosemary (2008). God's Architect: Pugin and the Building of Romantic Britain. London: Penguin. OCLC 666038634.
- Knox, James (2008). Cartoons and Coronets: The Genius of Osbert Lancaster. London: Frances Lincoln. ISBN 978-0-7112-2938-9.
- Lancaster, Osbert (1938). Pillar to Post (first ed.). London: John Murray. OCLC 1150976101.
- Lancaster, Osbert (1948) [1939]. Homes Sweet Homes. London: John Murray. OCLC 1126354190.
- Lancaster, Osbert (1959). Here, of All Places. London: John Murray. OCLC 2589866.
- Smith, Leslie (1989). "Ben Travers and the Aldwych Farces". Modern British Farce: A Selective Study of British Farce from Pinero to the Present Day. London: Rowman & Littlefield. ISBN 0389208205.
- Strang, Ronald (2002). "Aldwych Farcical". The Continuum Companion to Twentieth Century Theatre. London and New York: Continuum. OCLC 276348600.
- Travers, Ben (1976). Plunder. London: Collings for the National Theatre. OCLC 1330606179.
- Travers, Ben (2014). Three Farces and a Comedy. London: Oberon. ISBN 9781849437936.\
- Trussler, Simon (2000). The Cambridge Illustrated History of British Theatre. Cambridge: Cambridge University Press. ISBN 978-0-52-179430-5.
