= Curzon Street Baroque =

Baroque revival interior design style

Osbert Lancaster's own illustration of the style he named Curzon Street Baroque

Curzon Street Baroque is a 20th-century inter-war Baroque revival style. It manifested itself principally as a form of interior design popular in the homes of Britain's wealthy and well-born intellectual elite. Its name was coined by the English cartoonist and author Osbert Lancaster, as Curzon Street in Mayfair was an address popular with London high society. (Note: Oscar Wilde mentions the street in four of his works: in The Picture of Dorian Gray, Lord Henry Wotton lives on Curzon Street; in Lady Windermere's Fan, the notorious Mrs. Erlynne lives at 84A Curzon Street; in Lord Arthur Savile's Crime, Lady Clementine Beauchamp lives on Curzon Street; and in An Ideal Husband, Lord Goring lives on Curzon Street.) While previous forms of Baroque interior design had relied on French 18th-century furnishings, in this form it was more often than not the heavier and more solid furniture of Italy, Spain, and southern Germany that came to symbolise the furnishings of new fashion.

While in vogue, roughly between 1927 and 1939, Curzon Street Baroque was also disparagingly known as "Buggers' Baroque" or "Decorators' Baroque". This was, according to author Jane Stevenson, because "a statistically implausible number of important men and women, and their decorators in the interwar arts, were gay". Among them were many of the leading writers, poets, and designers who used and promoted the style.

== Naissance ==
Lancaster's satirical illustration of true 18th-century "Baroque", with exaggerated motifs, naked male statuary, guardsmen, and flunkeys

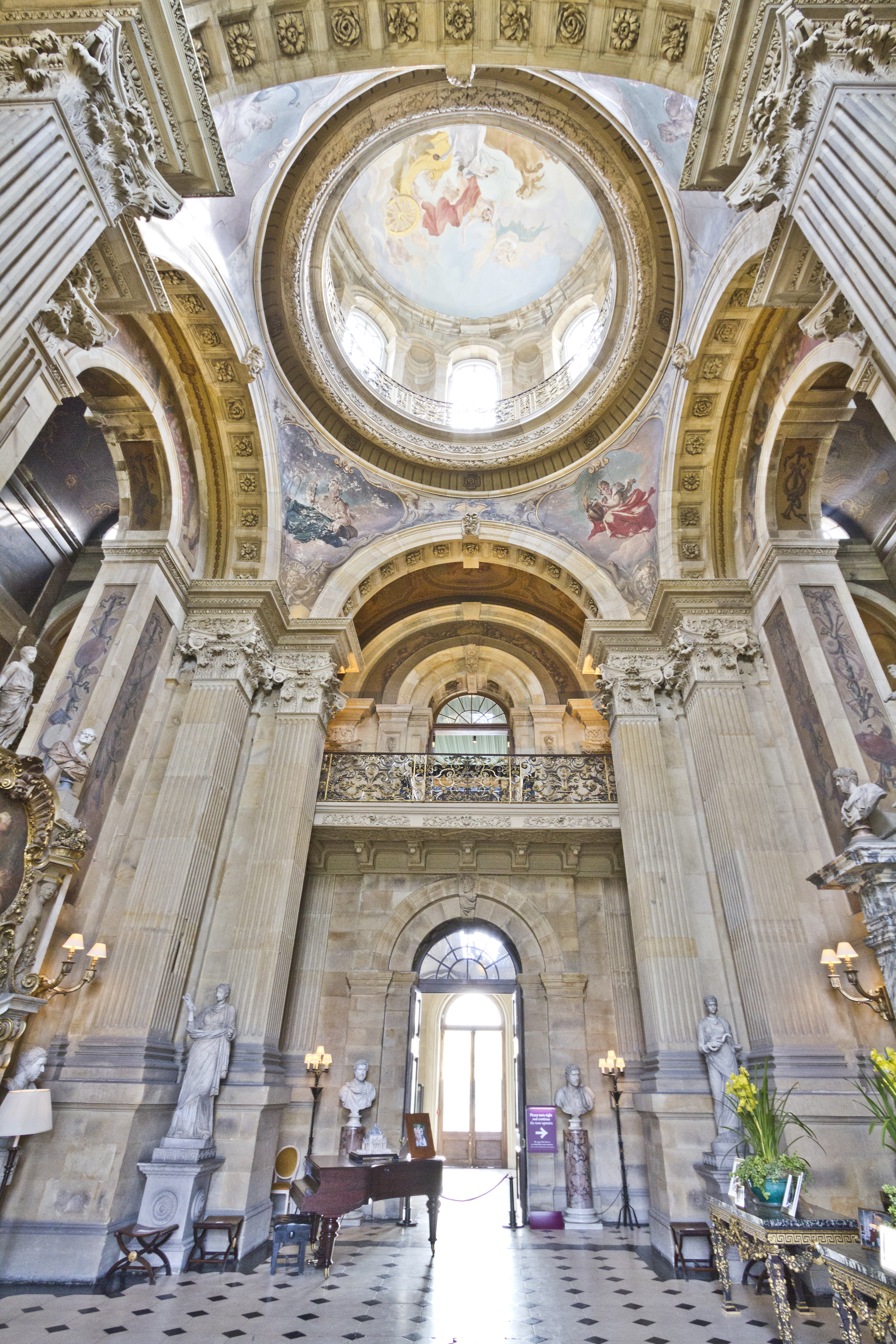
A true Baroque interior: the hall at Castle Howard, built circa 1706

True Baroque architecture, internal and external, employs architectural drama and surprise, chiaroscuro (light and shadow) pulse and a diversity of fanciful and joyous shapes and curves. However, Baroque has never been truly to the British taste. Having evolved as a derivative form of Renaissance architecture, in mainland Europe, in the mid-17th century, it made a brief appearance in Britain, at the beginning of the 18th century. It was pioneered in Britain, most notably, by Sir John Vanbrugh with his three principal projects Blenheim Palace, Castle Howard, and Seaton Delaval. Of these three monumental houses, only the earliest, Castle Howard, employs the true fanciful style of Baroque seen in mainland Europe; the remaining two rely heavily on mass and chiaroscuro to display their baroque qualities. In Britain, the style soon fell from fashion, and by the 1760s was replaced by the more serious and severe Neoclassical architecture. Osbert Lancaster put the British dislike of Baroque down to a national "ill-concealed dislike" of "cleverness", a virtue essential for any successful Baroque architect.

As a revival style, Baroque made a brief reappearance at the beginning of the 20th century, but in a confused form known as Edwardian Baroque architecture. As a revived form of interior decoration, it really dates from the 1924 publication of Sir Sacheverell Sitwell's book Southern Baroque Art, which concentrated on the ornate Baroque style then regarded as vulgar and excessive. Sitwell with his two siblings, Edith Sitwell and Osbert Sitwell, known collectively as the Sitwells, formed an identifiable literary and artistic clique around themselves in London during the period 1916 to 1930. The book's publication sparked an artistic reevaluation of the style. The painter Rex Whistler developed a Baroque influence to his work, while the society photographer Cecil Beaton has been described as full of "Baroque playfulness." This influence was soon picked up by the leading high society decorators of the period, who developed a pared-back 20th-century version of Baroque. Osbert Lancaster, a satirist, author, and cartoonist, then named it Curzon Street Baroque (Curzon Street being one of London's smartest addresses).

Often mixing antique and modern furniture in the same room, Curzon Street Baroque, has been described as a rejection of Modernism. However, as a reformation style, it was more a rejection of the dark and cluttered Victorian style. The opinion of Victorian Architecture and style was at an all-time low, with Osbert Lancaster's fellow wit and contemporary, PG Wodehouse, stating: "It is pretty generally admitted that few Victorians were to be trusted within reach of a trowel and a pile of bricks." Curzon Street Baroque certainly avoided the straight clean lines of Modernism and the dark woodwork of the Victorian era in favour of curves of "overwrought iron and Knole sofas, forests of twisted baroque candlesticks and pickled-oak occasional tables with the early southern-German look inspired by the arty Sitwells." Walls were painted pastel colours, often a shade of green, and where the patrons could afford it, at least one "feature panel" was installed in a room. These were large paintings or murals, often let into the newly repainted panelling, often in the form of trompe-l'œil. In the dining room at Sandringham, the panels were valuable tapestries given by King Alfonso XII of Spain.

Externally, with a few exceptions, the revival style was less popular. However, the architect, Clough Williams-Ellis, would adopt a colourful Northern Italianate pastiche Baroque theme as the style for the design of Portmeirion. The late 17th-century Upton House was remodelled by the architect Percy Morley Horder between 1927 and 1929 for the 2nd Lord Bearsted with some external baroque motif, but chiefly the Baroque was confined to the interior.

== Components of the style ==
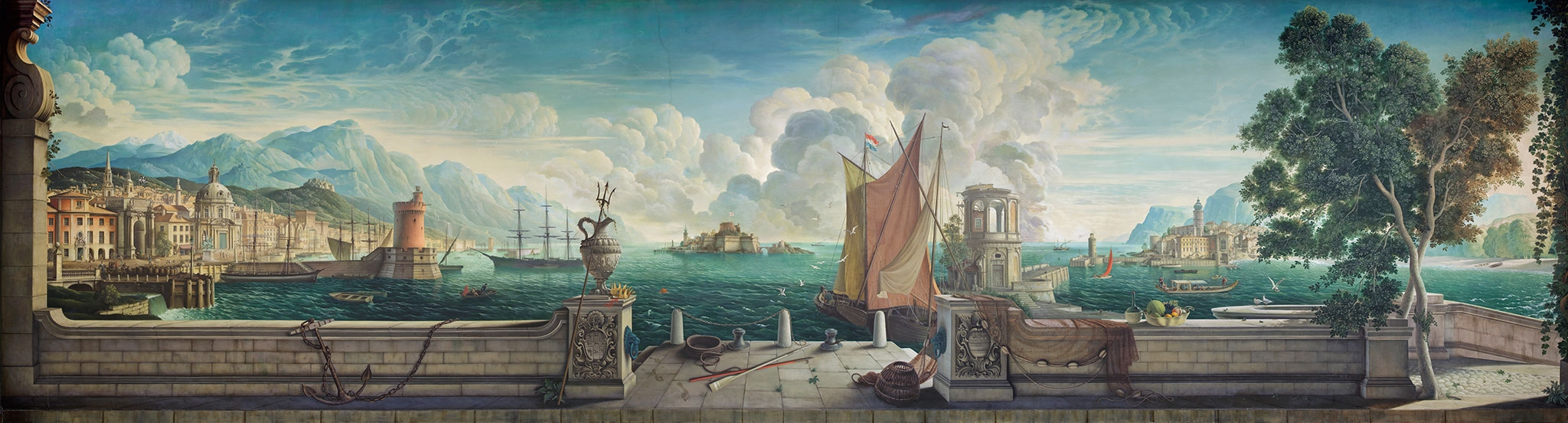
A Canaletto ("often suspicious") was a feature of the scheme. However, for the rich Rex Whistler could provide something similar. Here, a Baroque "Capriccio" mural at Plas Newydd, the "feature panel" of the dining room

According to Osbert Lancaster, key constituents and elements of Curzon Street Baroque included Venetian hand-painted furniture and art in the style of Canaletto (often of doubtful provenance). An ecclesiastical air could also be employed, which could be achieved by twisted Baroque candlesticks, old leather bound hymn books hollowed out to become cigarette boxes, and ancient gilt prie-dieux transformed into cabinets for the disguising of gramophones. Further objets d'art would include plaster saints suffering torment in coverings of iridescent paint.

Lancaster also stated that French furniture, much of it gilt and with cabriole legs, which was such a large part of 17th-, 18th-, and early 20th-century Baroque furnishings, was no longer considered fashionable. Lancaster's own illustration of the style includes a French style occasional table with cabriole legs. However, such furniture was still used within the style by some decorators including Elsie de Wolfe, who worked in a particularly feminine and flamboyant style.

An important feature of the style, not always possible due to the expense, was the feature wall. Often this was a trompe-l'œil mural meant to create the Baroque element of surprise and illusion. The era's most celebrated painter of these was Rex Whistler, most notably his Tent Room at Port Lympne and his Italian panorama in the dining room at Plas Newydd of 1938. The setting of such murals and other paintings and tapestries was often in panels rather than frames, a Baroque feature dating from the 17th century. It was also acceptable to mix old and new furniture together in the same room. A further feature, although often not present because of cost or architectural restraints, were wrought iron gates in place of doors or window shutters.

== Examples ==
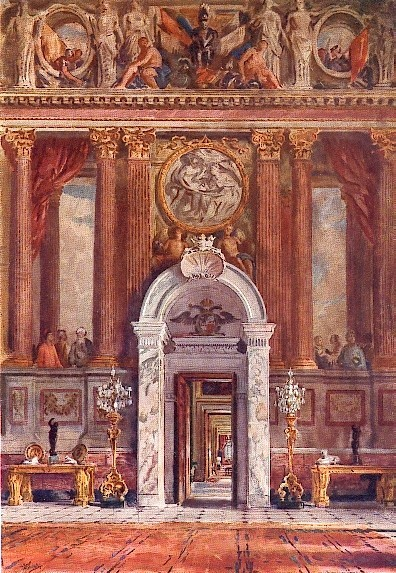
William Ranken's painting of the 18th century saloon at Blenheim Palace with trompe-l'œil murals, creating an illusion of space and perspective. These were to be a feature of Curzon Street Baroque two hundred years later.

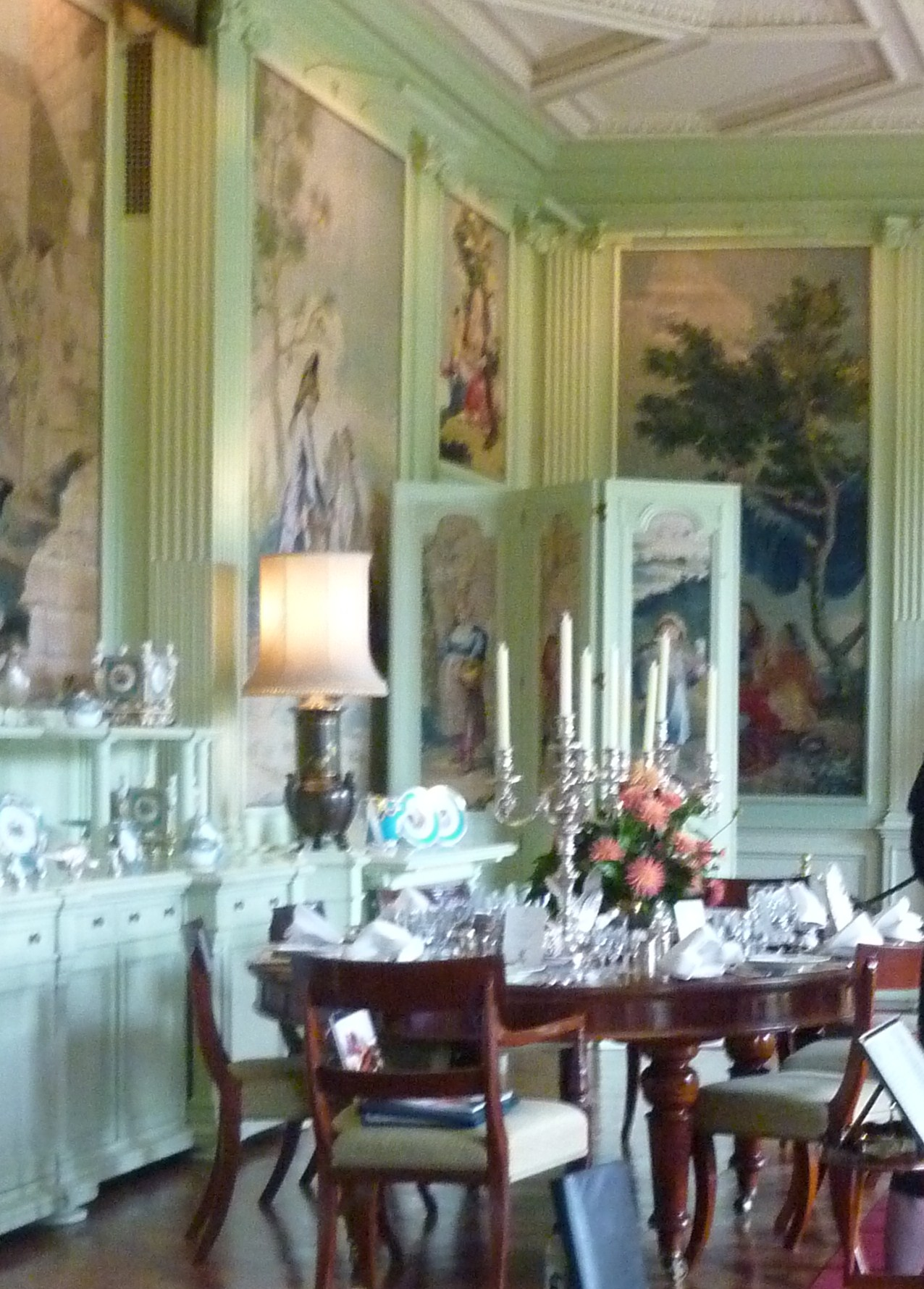
The dining room at Sandringham House redecorated for Queen Mary in the 1920s. Here, tapestry takes the place of murals.

18th century Baroque at Blenheim Palace and Curzon Street Baroque at Sandringham House

Outside of London, Baroque was frequently employed by the newly rich when rebuilding their newly acquired country houses. When the wealthy merchant banker Vivian Smith, 1st Baron Bicester, acquired Tusmore Park, Oxfordshire, in 1929, he immediately brought in the architects Imrie and Angell to sweep away the heavy Jacobean woodwork and introduce a Baroque interior, which culminated in the staircase hall, with a double staircase, heavy with wrought iron, segmented arches, and a gilded chandelier hanging from a ceiling embellished with a gilded starburst. At Upton House, Lord Bearsted's architect continued his baroque theme within, installing ornate overmantels, columns, panelling, and a curved interior balcony, all in the fashionable pared-back Baroque style.

One of the best examples of Curzon Street Baroque can be found in the Italian Drawing Room at Eltham Palace; although the interior is of an art deco design, Curzon Street Baroque was chosen for the principal drawing room. The house, a historic former royal palace, was vastly extended between 1933 and 1936 for Stephen Courtauld and his socialite wife Virginia. In the Drawing Room, their interior designer Piero Malacrida de Saint-August installed all the requisite features of the style, such as antique wrought iron from Spanish churches, acquired from Mayfair antique shops, heavy furniture, and gilt light fittings with parchment lampshades.

== Disparaging descriptions ==
In 2008 the architectural historian Gavin Stamp described Osbert Lancaster's Pillar to Post (1938)—later revised and combined with the sequel Homes Sweet Homes (1939)—as "one of the most influential books on architecture ever published–and certainly the funniest". Lancaster felt that architects and architectural writers had created a mystique that left the lay person confused, and in the two books he set out to demystify the subject, with, he said, "a small mass of information leavened by a large dose of personal prejudice." (Note: By the time the two books were revised and republished in 1959 he had modified some of his earlier views—his inclination to mock Victorian gothic architecture in general and John Ruskin in particular had diminished—but he left his original text largely unchanged. He did so, he said, because although he was conscious of being older he was not sure he was any wiser.) Lancaster, no doubt, intended his description of the new Baroque interiors as 'Curzon Street' to be a gentle criticism, suggesting they were lightweight compared to the original form. He disparaged and renamed other forms of contemporary architecture too, with titles such as Bankers' Georgian, Stockbroker Tudor, Aldwych Farcical and By-pass Variegated. Curzon Street Baroque stuck and has been used by architectural historians since. Simon Jenkins in his description of the redecoration of Sandringham House in the 1920s and 1930s, when dark Edwardian panelling was painted lighter colours and paintings were fitted into the moulded panels, risked a hypothetical charge of lèse-majesté by describing the decoration as Curzon Street Baroque.

The parodying and disparaging of new architecture and styles in the 1930s was a fashionable thing to do and not confined to Lancaster; Evelyn Waugh mocked the modern movement in his novel Decline and Fall, when he described the new country house of Margot Beste-Chetwynde, King's Thursday, as "in the style of a chewing-gum factory." While closer to Curzon Street Baroque, he parodies one of its designers, Lady Sybil Colefax, as the horrendous interior designer Mrs Beaver in A Handful of Dust.

=== Buggers' Baroque ===
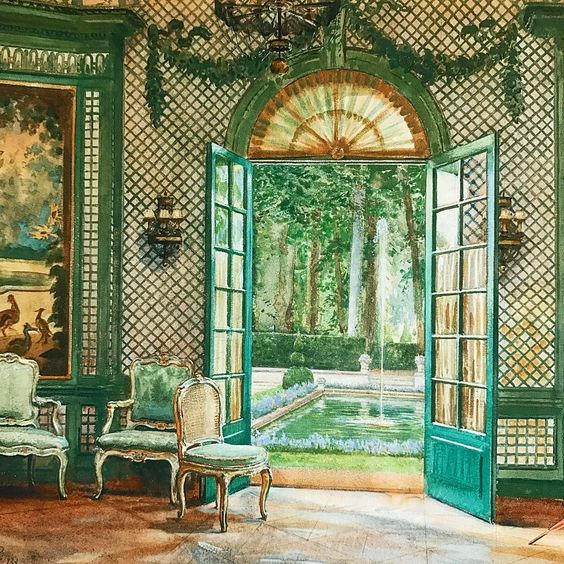
The bisexual decorator Elsie De Wolfe's music pavilion painted by homosexual artist William Ranken

The term "Buggers' Baroque" was not intended as gentle or even fashionable, witty criticism. "Bugger" being one of the cruder words for a homosexual, it was an attack on the style and, more pointedly, on those using and employing it. During the 1930s, the unattributed sobriquet Buggers' Baroque was used to describe the style more often than any of the other alternatives. As an attack, it was serious: homosexuality was a crime at the time and carried a prison sentence. (Note: So adverse was public opinion to homosexuality that in 1929, when the style was still in its infancy, then Home Secretary William Joynson-Hicks threatened to bring legal proceedings against the author Radclyffe Hall unless she withdrew from publication her novel The Well of Loneliness on the grounds that it was gravely detrimental to public interest.)

However, while a crime in 1930s Britain, homosexuality was more tolerated than it was earlier and later in the century. It was often quietly accepted in the more liberal upper-class, intellectual, and artistic circles. The brother of Sacheverell Sitwell, whose book was the inspiration for the style, the eminent writer and poet Osbert Sitwell, had been in a homosexual relationship since at least 1925, yet remained a close friend of the royal family, frequently moving in the most elite of aristocratic and artistic circles. However, Sitwell's "secret" was kept far from the public domain. (Note: Osbert Sitwell's brother explained, somewhat incredibly, that the royal family liked homosexuals as they were not likely to cause a repeat of the Lady Flora Hastings scandal. See: "Osbert Sitwell: desire for life, desire for love" Retrieved 15 July 2019) Indeed, it was Osbert Sitwell's famed dining room at his London house which was the apotheosis of the style, with green walls, shell chairs from an 18th-century grotto, verde-antique marble resting on gilded supports with large Baroque masks and a mirror which Sitwell himself, seemingly unaware of the homoerotic undertones, described as "with playful black cupids, naked except for neat gold pants."

Whatever the merits of his decor, Sitwell clearly thought his own interior Baroque to be of a higher form than used elsewhere, as in his 1936 poem "Rat Week", in verse three, he ridiculed the female society decorators deploying the soft palettes of the style, Sybil Colefax and Elsie de Wolfe (also known by her married name, Lady Mendl); both were friends of the abdicated British monarch Edward VIII.

That gay, courageous pirate crew, (Note: It is unlikely that Sitwell was using the word "gay" to imply homosexuality. The euphemism was not commonly used or understood at the time, and Sitwell, anxious to keep his preferences out of the public domain, never referred to the subject in his writings. See: Osbert Sitwell: desire for life, desire for love Retrieved 15 July 2019)
With sweet Maid Mendl at the Prow,
Who upon royal wings oft flew
To paint the Palace white – (and how!)
With Colefax – in her iron cage (Note: Sibyl Colefax's fondness for royalty and celebrities made her the butt of many jokes. Invited by the cruelly mischievous Gerard Berners to dine with the P.o.W, she accepted with great excitement, but for the amusement of the other guests, Berners seated her next to the dull and socially less significant Provost of Worcester.)
Of curls – who longed to paint it beige;

Looking back with the benefit of hindsight, it is today known that many of the artisans and their patrons of the 1930s were homosexuals. Besides Osbert Sitwell, another friend of royalty, the celebrated interior designer Elsie de Wolfe (known in Britain as Lady Mendl) had lesbian affairs. The society architect Philip Tilden was a homosexual, as was his patron Philip Sassoon, whose house at Port Lympne, had many Curzon Street baroque features. Patrons of the style often had both their portraits and rooms painted by the homosexual artist William Bruce Ellis Ranken. Whatever the truth of the term, no designer or patron of "Buggers' Baroque" was ever likely to challenge the accusation as discretion was the key to survival: when William Lygon, 7th Earl Beauchamp, known in society circles to be homosexual, was publicly exposed as a homosexual by his brother-in-law the Duke of Westminster in 1931, he had no option but to flee the country to avoid arrest, spending the remainder of his life in exile. Westminster later wrote him a letter beginning "Dear Bugger-in-Law."

=== Decorators' Baroque ===
A less damning sobriquet than Buggers' Baroque, Decorators' Baroque was, in truth, a more accurate name because the style was, more often than not, developed by interior decorators rather than architects. Many of the style's components were portable ornaments rather than fixtures and mortar. The rise of the style could also be attributed to the huge increase and popularity in interior decorators: in 1912, the London Post Office Directory listed only four, but by 1920, this number had risen to 122, over 60 of them in Mayfair, close to Curzon Street. Another type of decorator also evolved in this period; these were often furniture dealers too, so it was possible for one decorator to completely alter a room's style, rather than just change the colours of the walls and fabrics, all with minimal stress to the patron.

== Associated with the style ==
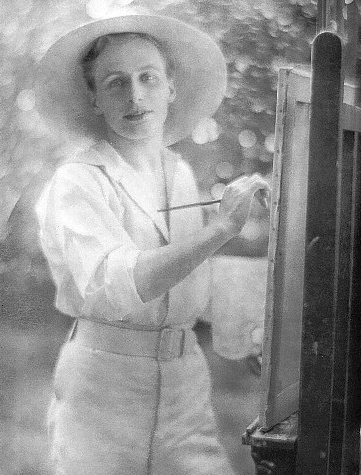
William Ranken who painted many of Curzon Street Baroque's patrons and their interiors.

- William Bruce Ellis Ranken (1881–1941)
- Elsie de Wolfe (1859–1950)
- Sybil Colefax (1874–1950)
- Osbert Sitwell (1892–1969)
- Sacheverell Sitwell (1897–1988)
- Osbert Lancaster (1908–1986)
- Rex Whistler (1905–1944)
- Piero Malacrida de Saint-August (1889-1983)
- Philip Tilden (1887–1956) Designed the classical swimming pool and garden at Port Lympne.

== Decline ==
The outbreak of World War II in 1939 put an end to unnecessary, luxurious redecoration. However, by the time Lancaster had defined Curzon Street Baroque in 1939, he was already documenting other newer styles: Aldwych Farcical–a pastiche of 19th-century country house interiors; Stockbrokers Tudor–heavy oak furniture and four-poster beds; and Modernistic–a style today known as 1930s Art deco. It is art deco which today defines the 1930s and came to be seen as "expressing all the vigour and optimism of the roaring twenties, and the idealism and escapism of the grim thirties." Curzon Street Baroque was a brief fashion employed by the wealthy, remembered today only because of its survival in a few of their homes, such as Coleton Fishacre, Eltham Palace, and Upton House, Warwickshire.

== Bibliography ==
- "What is Art Deco?". Art Deco Trust. 2013.
- Benton, Charlotte; Tim Benton; Ghislaine Wood (2015). Art Deco 1910–1939. Harry N. Abrams. ISBN 978-1-85177-833-1.
- Brittain-Catlin, Timothy J. (2014). Bleak Houses: Disappointment and Failure in Architecture. MIT Press. ISBN 9780262321259.
- Calloway, Stephen, Baroque Baroque: The Culture of Excess, Phaidon Press, 1994, ISBN 0714829854
- Charlish, Nicky. "A style that sings and dances". Culture Wars. Archived from the original on 4 July 2019.
- Dutton, David (Summer 1999). "William Lygon, 7th Earl Beauchamp (1872–1938)" (PDF). Journal of Liberal History (23).
- Graham, Mhairi. Elsie De Wolfe: America's First Interior Decorator AnOther magazine, October 16, 2014. Retrieved 11 July 2019
- Hall, Michael. "Buggers and decorators: What was an interwar movement responding to?" The Times Literary Supplement, October 17, 2018.
- Hoare, Philip. Design: Oriel the wizard of Walworth. The Independent, London, England, 26 June 1998. Retrieved 3 July 2019
- Jenkins, Simon. England's Thousand Best Houses, Penguin, London, 2003, ISBN 978-0-7139-9596-1
- Lancaster, Osbert (1939). Homes Sweet Homes.
- Lancaster, Osbert (1938). Pillar to Post: The Pocket Lamp of Architecture. London: John Murray.
- Lucie-Smith, Edward (1988). The Essential Osbert Lancaster: An Anthology in Brush and Pen. London: Barrie and Jenkins. ISBN 978-0-7126-2036-9.
- Pearson, John, "Foreword" to Rat Week by Osbert Sitwell, Michael Joseph, 1986, ISBN 0 7181 1859 6
- Sparke, Penny, Elsie de Wolfe: The Birth of Modern Interior Decoration, Acanthus Press, New York, 2005, ISBN 0-926494-27-9
- Sitwell, Osbert, Queen Mary and Others, Michael Joseph, London, 1974, ISBN 0 7181 1222 9
- Sitwell, Osbert, Rat Week: An Essay on the Abdication, Michael Joseph, 1986, ISBN 0 7181 1859 6
- Stamp, Gavin (2013). Anti-Ugly: Excursions in English Architecture and Design. London: Aurum Press. ISBN 978-1-78131-123-3.
- Stevenson, Jane (March 2018). "Adrian Tinniswood: Not a Straight Line in Sight (review)". Literary Review.
- Tinniswood, Adrian (2016). The Long Weekend: Life in the English Country House Between The Wars. Random House. ISBN 978-1448191246.
- Waldock, Rachel, What were the effects on homosexuality in Britain in the 1930s Edinburgh Napier University: Undergraduate essay, 2012. On Academia.edu. Retrieved 15 July 2019.
- Woods, Gregory (12 April 2016). "The influence of homosexuality on Western culture". The Independent. London, England.
- Worsley, Giles (2002). England's Lost Houses. London: Aurum Press. ISBN 1-85410-820-4.
