= Pont Street =

Street in Knightsbridge/Belgravia, London

Coordinates: 51°29′49″N 0°09′37″W

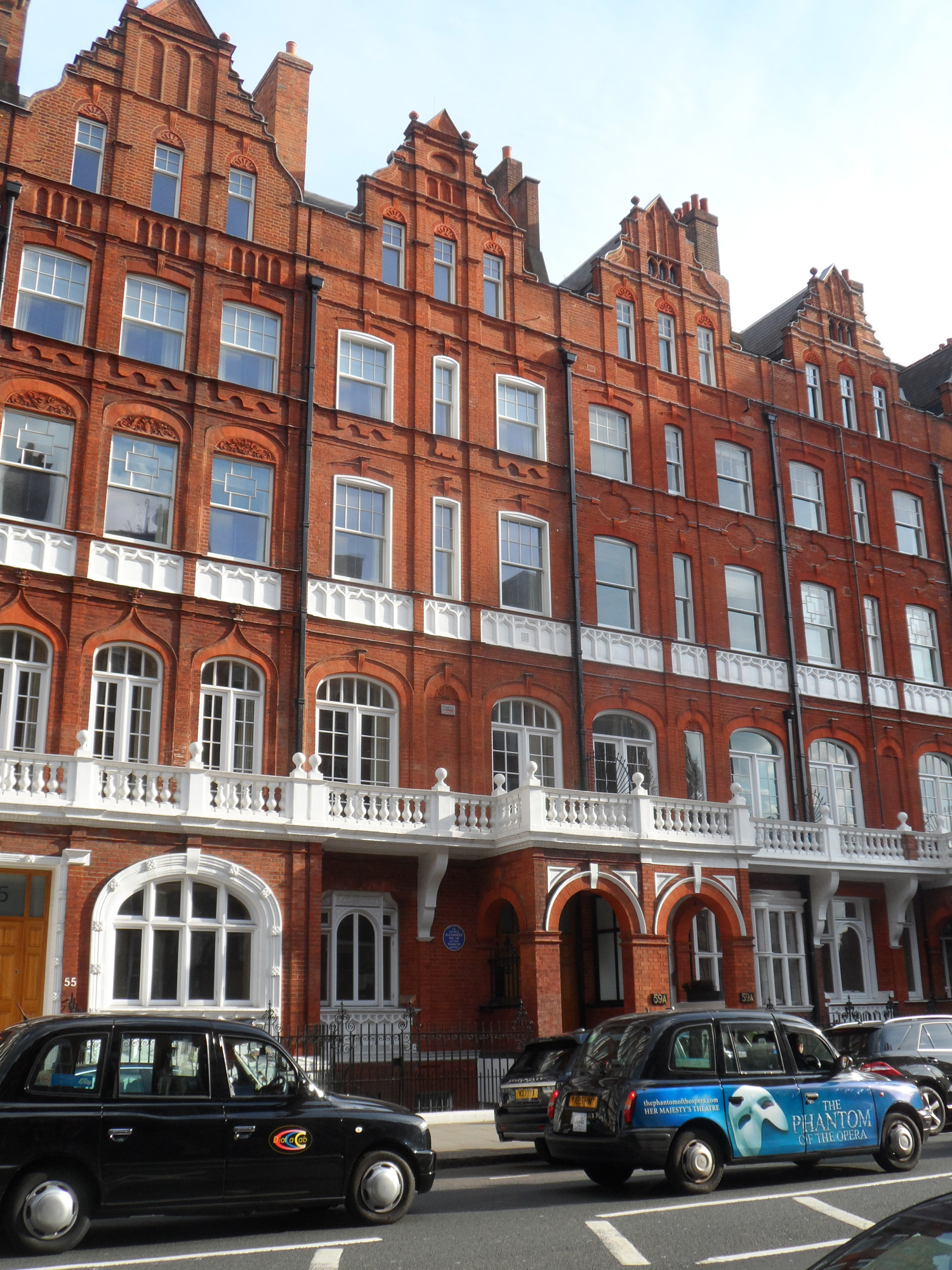
View centred on no. 57, Pont Street, showing Pont Street Dutch houses

Pont Street is a fashionable street in the Royal Borough of Kensington and Chelsea, London, traversing the areas of Knightsbridge and Belgravia. The street is not far from the Knightsbridge department store Harrods to its north-west. The street crosses Sloane Street in the middle, with Beauchamp Place to the west and Cadogan Place, and Chesham Place, to the east, eventually leading to Belgrave Square. On the west side, Hans Place leads off the street to the north and Cadogan Square to the south.

== History ==
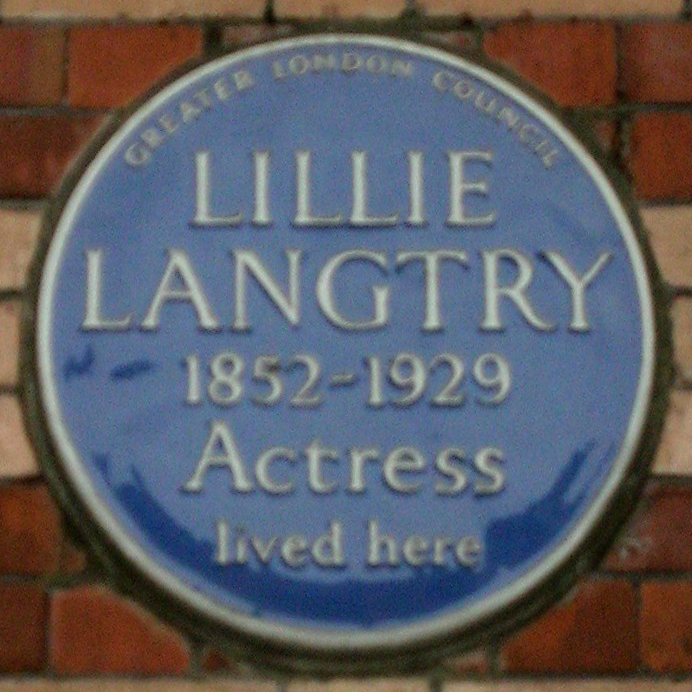
Blue plaque commemorating the actress Lillie Langtry in Pont Street

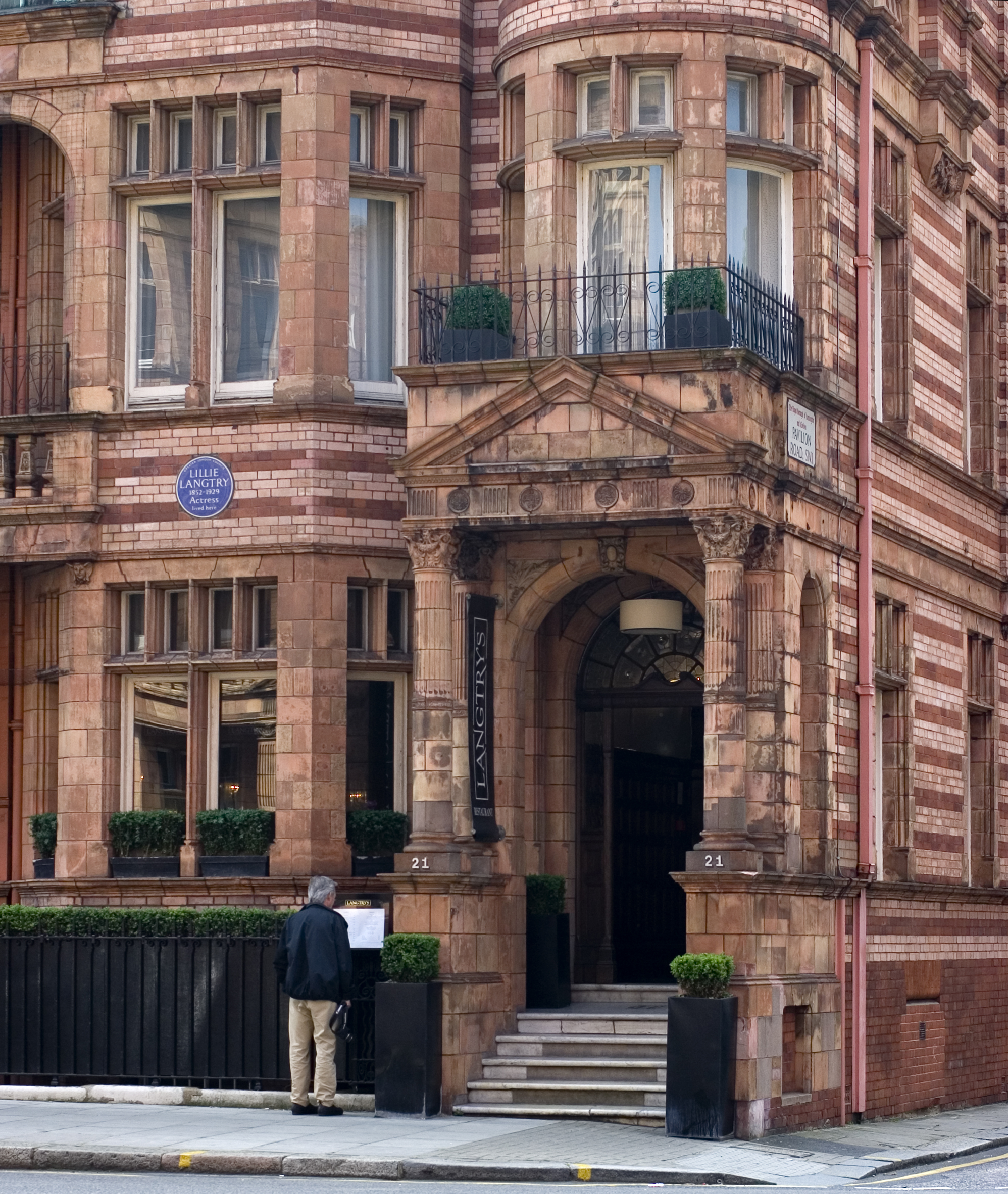
21 Pont Street, home of Lillie Langtry

The actress Lillie Langtry (1852–1929) lived from 1892 to 1897 at 21 Pont Street, marked with a blue plaque in 1980. The building became part of the Cadogan Hotel in 1895, but she still stayed in her old bedroom even after this. Oscar Wilde was arrested in room number 118 of the Cadogan Hotel on 6 April 1895.

Field Marshal William Nicholson, 1st Baron Nicholson died at 15 Pont Street in 1918. Politician Harry Crookshank (1893–1961) lived from 1937 until his death at 51 Pont Street.

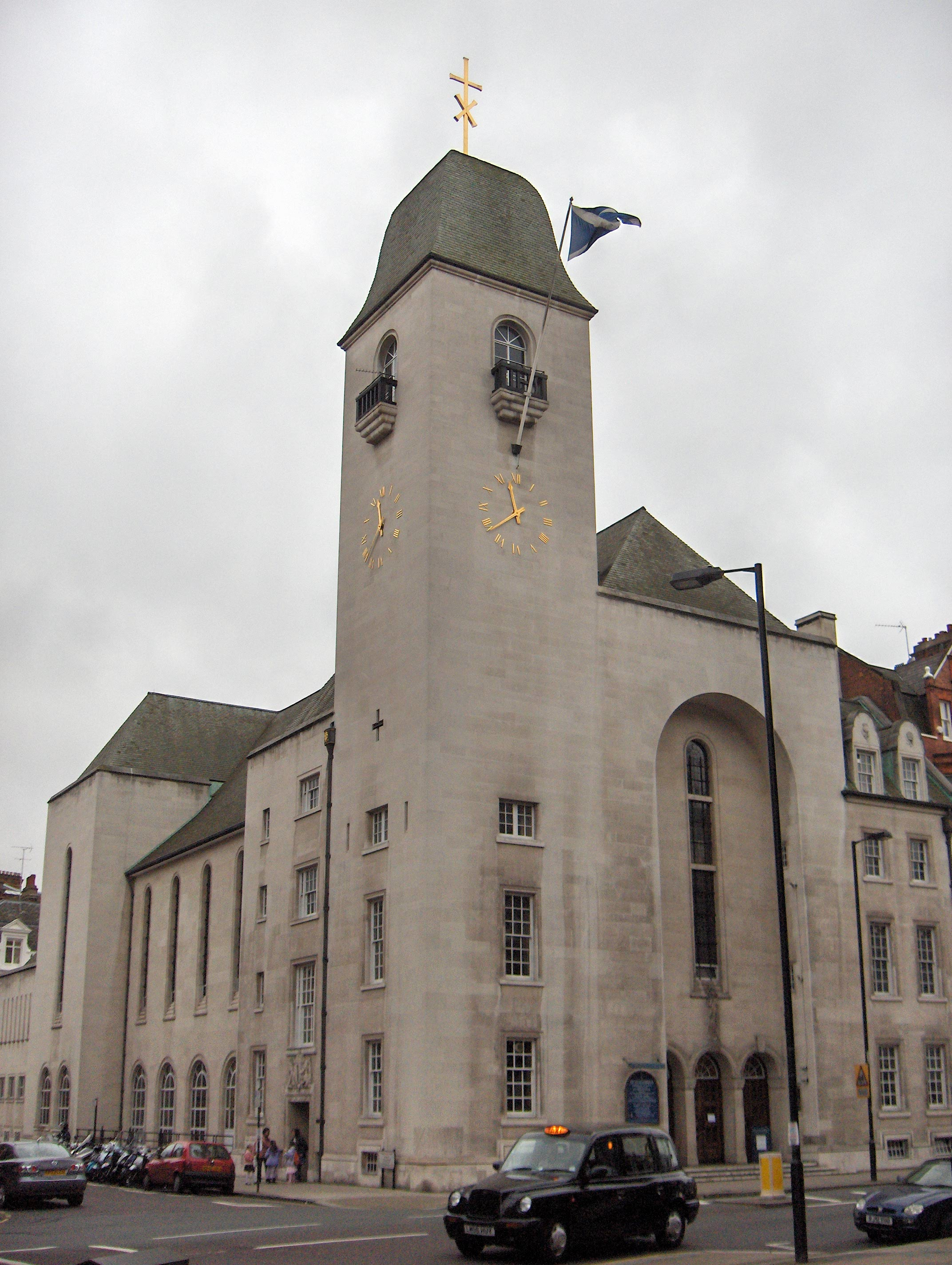
St Columba's Church

St Columba's Church in Pont Street was designed in the 1950s by the architect Sir Edward Maufe (1883–1974), who also designed the brick Guildford Cathedral. It is one of the two London congregations of the Church of Scotland. The original St Columba's Church building of 1884 was destroyed during the Blitz of World War II on the night of 10 May 1941.

Portmeirion was an antiques shop in Pont Street, established by Sam Beazley and Adrienne Barker. It was named after the village of that name in north Wales because of Beazley's family connection to the village. The shop later became the headquarters of Portmeirion Pottery. A section of railing from the Liverpool Sailors' Home was installed outside the shop by Clough Williams-Ellis.

The Challoner Club, an exclusively Catholic gentleman's club, was based at 59 Pont Street from 1949 to 1997.

A restaurant called Drones is located at 1 Pont Street (not to be confused with the fictional Drones Club of P. G. Wodehouse).

== Pont Street Dutch ==
"Pont Street Dutch", a term coined by Osbert Lancaster, is the architectural style typified by the large red brick gabled houses built in the 1880s in Pont Street. Nikolaus Pevsner writes of the style as "tall, sparingly decorated red brick mansions for very wealthy occupants, in the semi-Dutch, semi-Queen-Anne style of Shaw or George & Peto".

== Transport ==
The nearest tube stations are Knightsbridge to the north and Sloane Square to the south.

== Literary references ==
- In Agatha Christie's The Secret of Chimneys (1925), the character Virginia Revel lives on Pont Street.
- In John Betjeman's poem, "The Arrest of Oscar Wilde at the Cadogan Hotel" (1937), the second stanza describes Wilde in 1895 gazing out of his hotel window:

To the right and before him Pont Street
Did tower in her new built red,
As hard as the morning gaslight
That shone on his unmade bed.

- In P. G. Wodehouse's The Code of the Woosters (1938), Mrs. Wintergreen, widow of the late Colonel H. H. Wintergreen and fiancée of Sir Watkyn Bassett, lives in Pont Street.
- In Evelyn Waugh's novel Brideshead Revisited (1945), "Pont Street" is a shorthand term for a particular upper class subculture. The character Julia and her friends say that "it was 'Pont Street' to wear a signet ring and to give chocolates at the theatre; it was 'Pont Street' at a dance to say, 'Can I forage for you?'".
- In Nancy Mitford's Love in a Cold Climate (1949), the heroine's aunt, who is bringing her up to mix in the best society, is said to "keep her nose firmly to Pont Street".
- In P. D. James's Devices and Desires (1989), the character Jonathen Reeves visits Pont Street: "it was after three o' clock before he was outside the block of flats. One fact was immediately apparent: no one who lived in this building and employed a housekeeper could possibly be poor."
