= Homes Sweet Homes =

1939 book by Osbert Lancaster

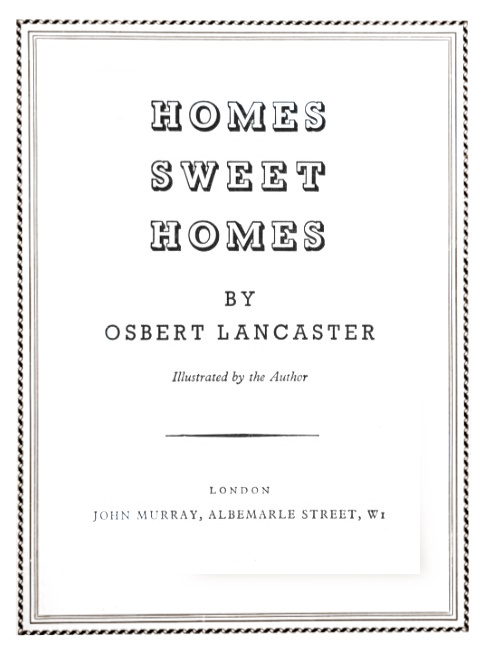
- Title page
- Author: Osbert Lancaster
- Publisher: John Murray
- Publication date: 1939

Homes Sweet Homes is a book by the artist and author Osbert Lancaster. It was published in 1939 as a sequel to the same writer's Pillar to Post. The earlier work focused on the exteriors of buildings over the ages; its successor concentrated on the interiors. The book comprises 34 chapters, each consisting of a page of text on the left and a drawing on the right. The texts vary in length but are between 220 and 450 words each.

In 1959 Lancaster published Here, of All Places, which brought together most of the chapters from Pillar to Post and all the chapters of Homes Sweet Homes, with some additional text and drawings.

Although the texts and the drawings are entertaining and sometimes comic, the book serves a serious purpose: making readers aware of good – and bad – architecture.

== Background and first publication ==
While the three were undergraduates at Oxford, Osbert Lancaster's friend John Betjeman introduced him to Jock Murray, the future head of the John Murray publishing house. The three remained lifelong friends, and Murray published the works of both writers. Lancaster's Pillar to Post was published in 1938, illustrating and commenting on the exteriors of Western buildings from ancient times to the present. He followed its success the following year with Homes Sweet Homes, a book on similar lines concentrating on the interiors of British buildings from Norman times to the onset of the Second World War. All his examples were his own invention, incorporating the essentials of real buildings of each period. He added humorous touches to his drawings, such as two Georgian men cheating at cards, a bored Regency man slumped in a deep chair, Victorian aesthetes striking poses, and an actress's gartered and slippered leg emerging from behind a screen in the Edwardian section.

== Content ==
Lancaster took the title of the book from the early 19th-century song "Home! Sweet Home!". (Note: This sentimental ballad with words by John Howard Payne and music by Henry Bishop is from their opera Clari, or The Maid of Milan. In The Annals of Covent Garden (1906), Henry Saxe Wyndham writes, "May 8, 1823, is, however, a memorable date in Covent Garden's history. It saw the production of an opera by Howard Payne and Bishop, the bare title of which, Clari, or The Maid of Milan, it is safe to say, is totally unknown to ninety-nine per cent, of the inhabitants of Great Britain. But it is almost equally certain that every English-speaking person in the world could hum an air first sung in that opera – the air of "Home, Sweet Home".) There are 34 chapters in the original book. Lancaster added new sections for subsequent editions. The 1939 book consists of

- Norman
- Gothic
- Tudor
- Elizabethan
- Jacobean
- Restoration
- Louis XIV
- Baroque
- Rococo
- Early Georgian
- Classic Revival
- Regency
- Early Victorian
- Le Style Rothschild
- Scottish Baronial
- Victorian Dining-Room
- Greenery Yallery
- The Earnest Eighties
- Anglican
- Diamond Jubilee
- Troisième République
- Art Nouveau
- Edwardian
- First Russian Ballet Period
- Ordinary Cottage
- Cultured Cottage
- Curzon Street Baroque
- Luxury Flat
- Aldwych Farcical
- Stockbrokers Tudor
- Modernistic
- Vogue Regency
- Functional
- Even More Functional

Aldwych Farcical: "Light and air, the former in small quantities, the latter in unlimited supplies, are admitted through a bewildering selection of doors and French windows which one constantly expects (such is the theatrical complexity of their arrangement) to fly open and reveal the pyjama-clad forms of Mr Robertson Hare or Mr Ralph Lynn."

The texts vary in length between 220 and 450 words. The shortest, "Even More Functional", comments on wartime austerity: "all attempt at applied decoration ... has been abandoned and exclusive reliance is placed on the inherent decorative qualities of corrugated iron and unbleached canvas". The longest, "Art Nouveau", compares that style with "the flamboyant Gothic of the later Middle Ages" and "mid-eighteenth-century rococo". As he had in Pillar to Post, Lancaster invented new labels for some of the periods and styles. Those from Homes Sweet Homes that became common currency were "Curzon Street Baroque", "Aldwych Farcical" and "Stockbrokers Tudor".

== Reception ==
The reviews for Homes Sweet Homes were enthusiastic. In the words of The Sketch: "All England laughed at Osbert Lancaster's satirical fun over architectural styles in Pillar to Post. He has now turned his attention to interior decoration and in Homes Sweet Homes ... he reviews the development of the Englishman's castle from Gothic to Gas-Proof with gaiety and considerable erudition". The Observer described the book as: "A superb history in seventy-eight pages of English home life down the ages ... full of such lovely wit that it would be better to quote large extracts rather than try to describe it". The reviewer in The Scotsman wrote:

Mr Lancaster's command of words is to be marvelled at. In a few humorously vivid sentences he conjures up the full impression of a style or era, be it Scottish Baronial, Greenery Yallery, Aldwych Farcical, or Stockbroker's Tudor; and he not only fits each "manner" into its social and historical niche, but explains it psychologically. Mastery of his subject and a joyfully malicious insight are as evident in the illustrations as in the text. Each drawing, perfect in detail, exudes atmosphere and a sly humour amply repaying close and repeated attention. Homes Sweet Homes should certainly not be missed.

== Later editions ==
Title page of Here, of All Places, 1959

The first edition sold out immediately and Murray brought out a second printing within a month. There were five further impressions between 1940 and 1948. An enlarged second edition was published in 1953. Later in the 1950s the future of Homes Sweet Homes became entwined with that of its 1938 predecessor, Pillar to Post. In 1959 Murray published Here, of All Places, which in one 190-page volume combines much of the content of both books, with a few sections dropped and many more, particularly on American architecture, added. Most of the new material focused on exteriors; sections on interiors added to the originals in Homes Sweet Homes were "Georgian: Ecclesiastical", "Le Modern Style", "Jungle-jungle" and "Neo-Victorian".

Murray published a second edition in 1975 with the title of "A Cartoon History of Architecture". The reviewer in The Times Literary Supplement called it "Not only the wittiest introduction to its subject, but one of the most stimulating as well", and The Bookseller commented that nobody else could combine deep learning with wit as Lancaster did.

In 2015 a three-volume boxed set was published, comprising Pillar to Post, Homes Sweet Homes, and Drayneflete Revealed (a 1951 work which did for an English country town roughly what Lancaster's earlier Progress at Pelvis Bay had done for a seaside resort). The art and architecture commentator Stephen Bayley, reviewing the reissue, wrote:

Osbert Lancaster is now forgotten or ignored as most architectural commentary adopts noisy radical "positions". Three facsimile volumes of his gentle, witty, erudite illustrated commentaries have been re-issued in a slip-case as Cartoons, Columns and Curlicues. [They] reveal an engaged, eclectic, humorous mind a world away from the tantrums of Zaha or the annoying angles of Koolhaas. Delicious.

== Notes, references and sources ==
=== Sources ===
- Cresswell, Julia (2000). The Penguin Dictionary of Clichés. London: Penguin. ISBN 978-0-14-051427-8.
- Lancaster, Osbert (1938). Pillar to Post (first ed.). London: John Murray. OCLC 1150976101.
- Lancaster, Osbert (1948) [1939]. Homes Sweet Homes. London: John Murray. OCLC 1126354190.
- Lancaster, Osbert (1959). Here, of All Places. London: John Murray. OCLC 2589866.
- Wyndham, Henry Saxe (1906). The Annals of Covent Garden Theatre, from 1732 to 1897. London: Chatto. OCLC 848295783.
