= Pont Street Dutch =

19th-century architectural style, mainly in London

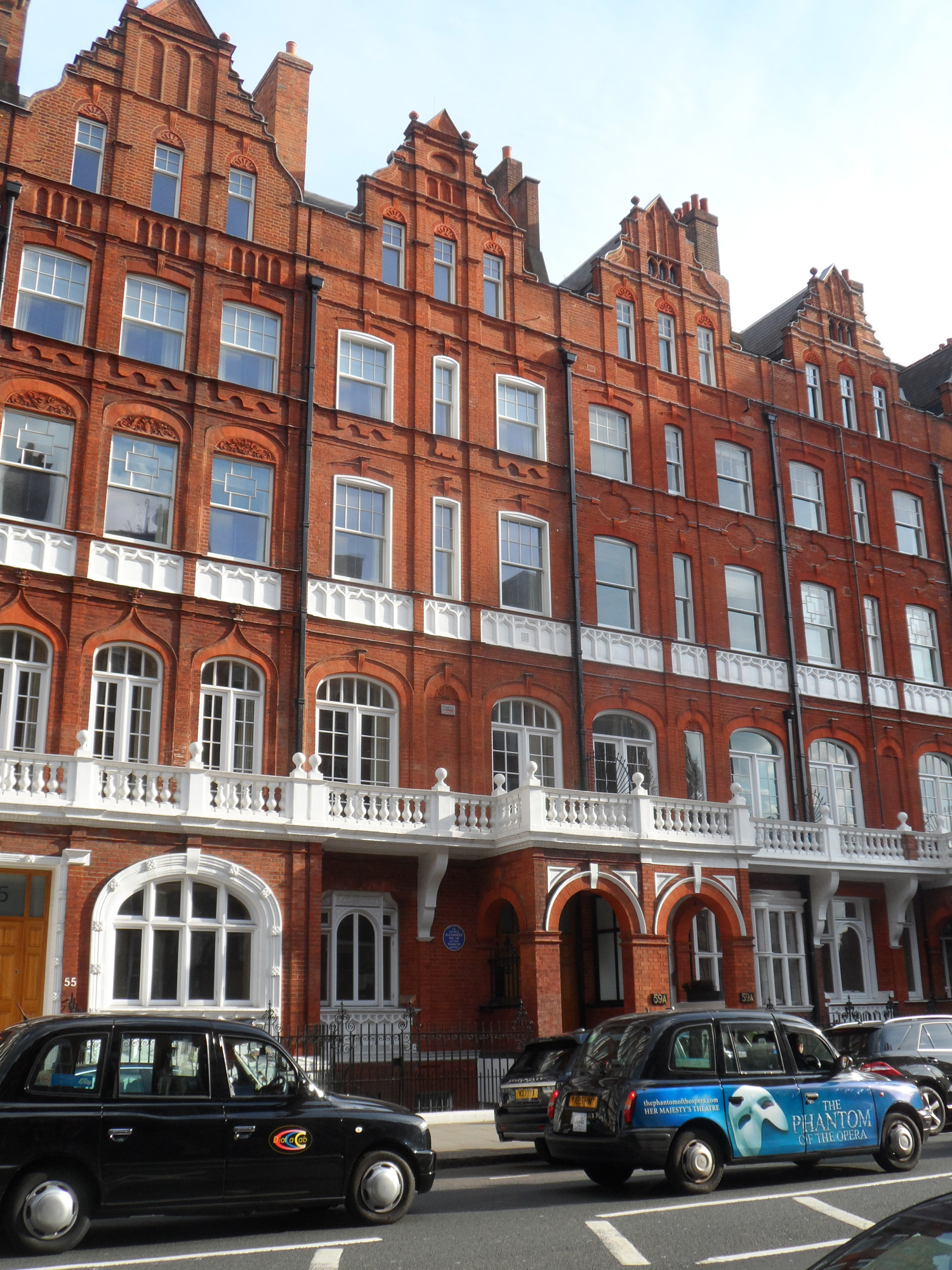
View centred on no. 57, Pont Street

Pont Street Dutch is a term coined by Osbert Lancaster to describe an architectural style typified by the large red brick gabled houses built in the 1880s in Pont Street and adjacent areas such as Hans Place and Cadogan Gardens in Knightsbridge, London. The description first appeared (alongside others, such as "Stockbroker Tudor") in Lancaster's Pillar to Post, published in 1938, and was subsequently adopted by other architectural writers. Nikolaus Pevsner writes of the style as "tall, sparingly decorated red brick mansions for very wealthy occupants, in the semi-Dutch, semi-Queen-Anne style of Shaw or George & Peto".
