= Pillar to Post =

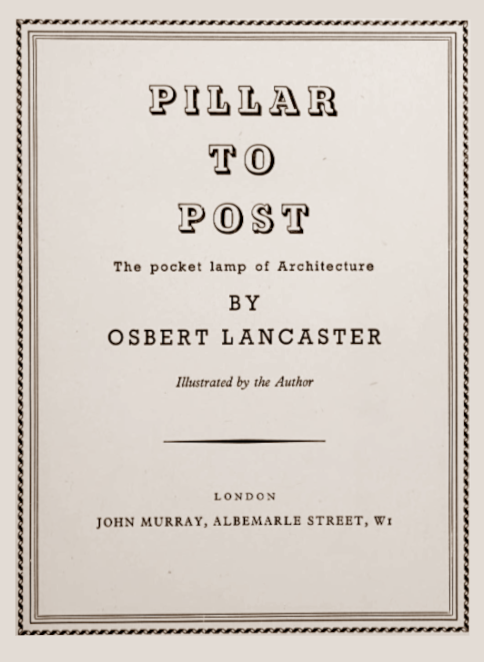
- Title page
- Author: Osbert Lancaster
- Publisher: John Murray
- Publication date: 1938
- OCLC: 1150976101

Pillar to Post is a book of drawings and text by Osbert Lancaster. It was first published in 1938 and covers the history of western architecture from Ancient Egypt to buildings of the 1930s. There were 40 chapters in the original edition. Lancaster later added two more. Each chapter consists of a page of text on the left and a drawing on the right. The texts vary in length but are typically between 300 and 400 words each.

A second edition was published in 1956 with some additional material, and most of the text and drawings were republished in 1959 in Here, of All Places which combined Pillar to Post and its 1939 successor, Homes Sweet Homes, which covered the interiors of buildings.

Although the texts and the drawings are entertaining and sometimes comic, the book serves a serious purpose: making readers aware of good – and bad – architecture.

== Background and first publication ==
The artist and critic Osbert Lancaster joined the staff of The Architectural Review in 1934. His contributions to the magazine included a series of illustrated satires on planning and architecture, under the collective title Progress at Pelvis Bay. The collected articles were turned into a book, under the same title, published in 1936. In the form of a spoof tourist guide it lampooned greedy and philistine property developers and incompetent and smug local government who between them have gradually spoiled a typical English seaside resort. The book received high praise from reviewers, and the publisher, Jock Murray of the firm John Murray, commissioned another book from Lancaster.

Lancaster's "By-pass Variegated", typical of his coinage and illustration in Pillar to Post: "See how carefully each householder is provided with a clear view into the most private offices of his next-door neighbour and with what careful disregard of the sun’s aspect the principal rooms are planned."

The new book, Pillar to Post took its title from an old English term signifying being harassed and dashing about. (Note: The Oxford English Dictionary defines the term as "hither and thither; to and fro. Usually implying rejection or harassment"."pillar". Oxford English Dictionary (online ed.). Oxford University Press. (Subscription or participating institution membership required.) According to the Penguin Dictionary of Clichés the term dates from the 15th century and may derive from the pillory or whipping post, or alternatively from parts of a real tennis court, in which a player's ball may be hit from pillar to post.) The book's sub-title is "The Pocket-Lamp of Architecture". It consists of Lancaster's drawings of imaginary exteriors on the odd-numbered pages opposite, on the even ones, short descriptions and critiques of the style. The text is typically between 300 and 400 words for each chapter; the shortest is "Very Early English" – 187 words, depicting a Stonehenge-like structure; the longest is "Scottish Baronial" – 407 words describing a rural Victorian building reminiscent of Balmoral Castle.

== Content ==
Lancaster's biographer James Knox describes Pillar to Post as "a disarming picture-book with a reforming agenda: to address 'the present lamentable state of English architecture' caused by the passivity of the intelligent public who 'when confronted with architecture, whether good, bad or indifferent, remain resolutely dumb – in both the original and transatlantic senses of the word'". Each two-page section of the book has its own title. Some titles are plainly factual, such as "Egypt", "Perpendicular" and "Art Nouveau". Others have more extravagant headings such as "Pont Street Dutch", "Stockbrokers Tudor" and "By-pass Variegated"; although Lancaster said that some of the more whimsical terms were already in circulation, most were either invented or popularised by him. The architectural scholar Christopher Hussey remarked on the author's inventive coinage of terms, and described the book as both perceptive and shrewd. On the reverse of the title page Lancaster wrote, "All the architecture in this book is completely imaginary, and no reference is intended to any actual building, living or dead".

=== Sections ===
The original 40 sections are:

- Egypt
- Greek
- Roman
- Byzantine
- Very Early English
- Norman
- Early English
- Decorated
- Perpendicular
- Tudor
- Elizabethan
- Renaissance
- English Renaissance
- Baroque
- Queen Anne
- Georgian (Town)
- Georgian (Country)
- Gothick
- Regency
- Municipal Gothic
- Gothic Revival II
- Kensington Italianate
- Salubrious Dwellings for the Industrious Artisan
- Public-House Classic
- Scottish Baronial
- Second Empire Renaissance
- Pont Street Dutch
- Art Nouveau
- Edwardian Baroque
- Wimbledon Transitional
- Stockbrokers Tudor
- Bankers Georgian
- Pseudish
- By-pass Variegated
- Park Lane Residential
- LCC Residential
- Modernistic
- Third Empire
- Marxist Non-Aryan
- Twentieth-Century Functional

For the second edition of the book, published by Murray in 1956, Lancaster added two new sections on more recent architectural styles: "Festival Flats" and "The Wide Open Plan".

== Reception ==
Reviewing the book after the publication of the first edition Harold Nicolson said of Lancaster's work, "Under that silken, sardonic smile there lies the zeal of an ardent reformer ... a most witty and entertaining book. But it is more than that. It is a lucid summary of a most important subject". Hector Bolitho wrote, "Osbert Lancaster's book is brilliant. What a talent!" and a reviewer in the US commented that the book "puts more fun and sense into architecture and points out more wearisome nonsense in its mere 87 pages than any rock-heavy trestle we know". Another reviewer commented on the way Lancaster lampooned the monolithic structures of the Russian communist and German Nazi regimes, which in his caricatures of them were "extremely funny" and "scarcely distinguishable" from each other. The Architects' Journal commented, "This journal does not often call a book important. It has no hesitation in so describing Pillar to Post". Seventy years after the book was published, the architectural historian Gavin Stamp described Pillar to Post as "one of the most influential books on architecture ever published – and certainly the funniest".

== Later editions ==
In 1948 Murray and Transatlantic Arts published an American edition in New York. In London, a second edition was published in 1956 with two new chapters. In his introduction Lancaster wrote that since the first edition, "much, including the author, has changed":

Title page of Here, of All Places, 1959

Thanks to economic necessity rather than any profound change of heart the menace of. the pseudo-academic architect is no longer immediate. The greater threat now comes from bureaucratic Philistinism and the short-sightedness of local authorities. Nevertheless my conviction that the only hope of a worthier architecture finally depends on a properly critical public opinion remains unshaken, and I have therefore resisted the temptation to rewrite or modify the existing text. For while one knows only too well that one is both older and sadder it would be foolish to assume that one is, necessarily, any wiser.

Later in the decade the future of Pillar to Post became entwined with that of its 1939 successor, Homes Sweet Homes, which covers the interiors of buildings from ancient times to the present as Pillar to Post covers the exteriors. In 1959 Murray published Here, of All Places, which in one 190-page volume combines much of the content of both books, with a few sections dropped and many more, particularly on American architecture, added. New sections on the exteriors of buildings were "Earliest, Earlier, Early", "Early Colonial", "Colonial", "Federal", "Deep Southern (Town)", "American Basic", "Carpenters' Gothic", "Old Brownstone", "Hudson River Bracketed", "Early Skyscraper", "Spanish Super-colonial", "Late Skyscraper", "Homes on the Range" and "Coca-Colonial". Murray published a second edition in 1975 with the title of "A Cartoon History of Architecture". Lancaster further expanded the book, adding sections on "Pop Nouveau", "High Rise" and "The Future of the Past (Some Thoughts on Preservation)". The reviewer in The Times Literary Supplement called it "Not only the wittiest introduction to its subject, but one of the most stimulating as well", and The Bookseller commented that nobody else could combine deep learning with wit as Lancaster did.

In 2015 a three-volume boxed set was published, comprising Pillar to Post, Homes Sweet Homes, and Drayneflete Revealed (a 1951 work which did for an English country town roughly what Progress at Pelvis Bay had done for a seaside resort). The architectural commentator Stephen Bayley, reviewing the reissue, wrote:

Osbert Lancaster is now forgotten or ignored as most architectural commentary adopts noisy radical "positions". Three facsimile volumes of his gentle, witty, erudite illustrated commentaries have been re-issued in a slip-case as Cartoons, Columns and Curlicues. [They] reveal an engaged, eclectic, humorous mind a world away from the tantrums of Zaha or the annoying angles of Koolhaas. Delicious.

== Notes, references and sources ==
=== Sources ===
- Boston, Richard (1989). Osbert: A Portrait of Osbert Lancaster. London: Collins. ISBN 978-0-00-216324-8.
- Cresswell, Julia (2000). The Penguin Dictionary of Clichés. London: Penguin. ISBN 978-0-14-051427-8.
- Knox, James (2008). Cartoons and Coronets: The Genius of Osbert Lancaster. London: Frances Lincoln. ISBN 978-0-7112-2938-9.
- Lancaster, Osbert (1938). Pillar to Post (first ed.). London: John Murray. OCLC 1150976101.
- Lancaster, Osbert (1956). Pillar to Post (second ed.). London: John Murray. OCLC 30185143.
- Lancaster, Osbert (1959). Here, of All Places. London: John Murray. OCLC 2589866.
- Lancaster, Osbert (1975). A Cartoon History of Architecture. London: John Murray. ISBN 0-71-953245-0.
- Stamp, Gavin (2013). Anti-Ugly: Excursions in English Architecture and Design. London: Aurum Press. ISBN 978-1-78131-123-3.
