= Osbert Lancaster =

English cartoonist and architectural writer (1908–1986)

Lancaster in the 1950s

Sir Osbert Lancaster CBE (4 August 1908 – 27 July 1986) was an English cartoonist, architectural historian, stage designer and author. He was known for his cartoons in the British press, and for his lifelong work to inform the general public about good buildings and architectural heritage.

The only child of a prosperous family, Lancaster was educated at Charterhouse School and Lincoln College, Oxford; at both he was an undistinguished scholar. From an early age he was determined to be a professional artist and designer, and studied at leading art colleges in Oxford and London. While working as a contributor to The Architectural Review in the mid-1930s, Lancaster published the first of a series of books on architecture, aiming to simultaneously amuse the general reader and demystify the subject. Several of the terms he coined as labels for architectural styles have gained common usage, including "Pont Street Dutch" and "Stockbroker's Tudor", and his books have continued to be regarded as important works of reference on the subject.

In 1938 Lancaster was invited to contribute topical cartoons to The Daily Express. He introduced the single column-width cartoon popular in the French press but not until then seen in British papers. Between 1939 and his retirement in 1981 he drew about 10,000 of these "pocket cartoons", which made him a nationally known figure. He developed a cast of regular characters, led by his best-known creation, Maudie Littlehampton, through whom he expressed his views on the fashions, fads and political events of the day.

From his youth, Lancaster wanted to design for the theatre, and in 1951 he was commissioned to create costumes and scenery for a new ballet, Pineapple Poll. Between then and the early 1970s he designed new productions for the Royal Ballet, Glyndebourne, D'Oyly Carte, the Old Vic and the West End. His productivity declined in his later years, when his health began to fail. He died at his London home in Chelsea, aged 77. His diverse career, honoured by a knighthood in 1975, was celebrated by an exhibition at the Wallace Collection marking the centenary of his birth and titled Cartoons and Coronets: The Genius of Osbert Lancaster.

== Life and career ==
=== Early years ===
Lancaster was born at 79 Elgin Crescent in London in 1908, the only child of Robert Lancaster (1880–1917) and his wife, Clare Bracebridge, née Manger. His paternal grandfather, Sir William Lancaster, rose from modest beginnings to become the chief executive of the Prudential Assurance Company, Lord of the manor of East Winch, Norfolk, and a philanthropist in the field of education. Osbert's mother was an artist, known for her paintings of flowers, who had exhibited regularly at the Royal Academy; his father was a publisher, who volunteered for the army on the outbreak of the First World War, was commissioned as a second lieutenant in the Norfolk Regiment, and was killed at the Battle of Arras in April 1917.

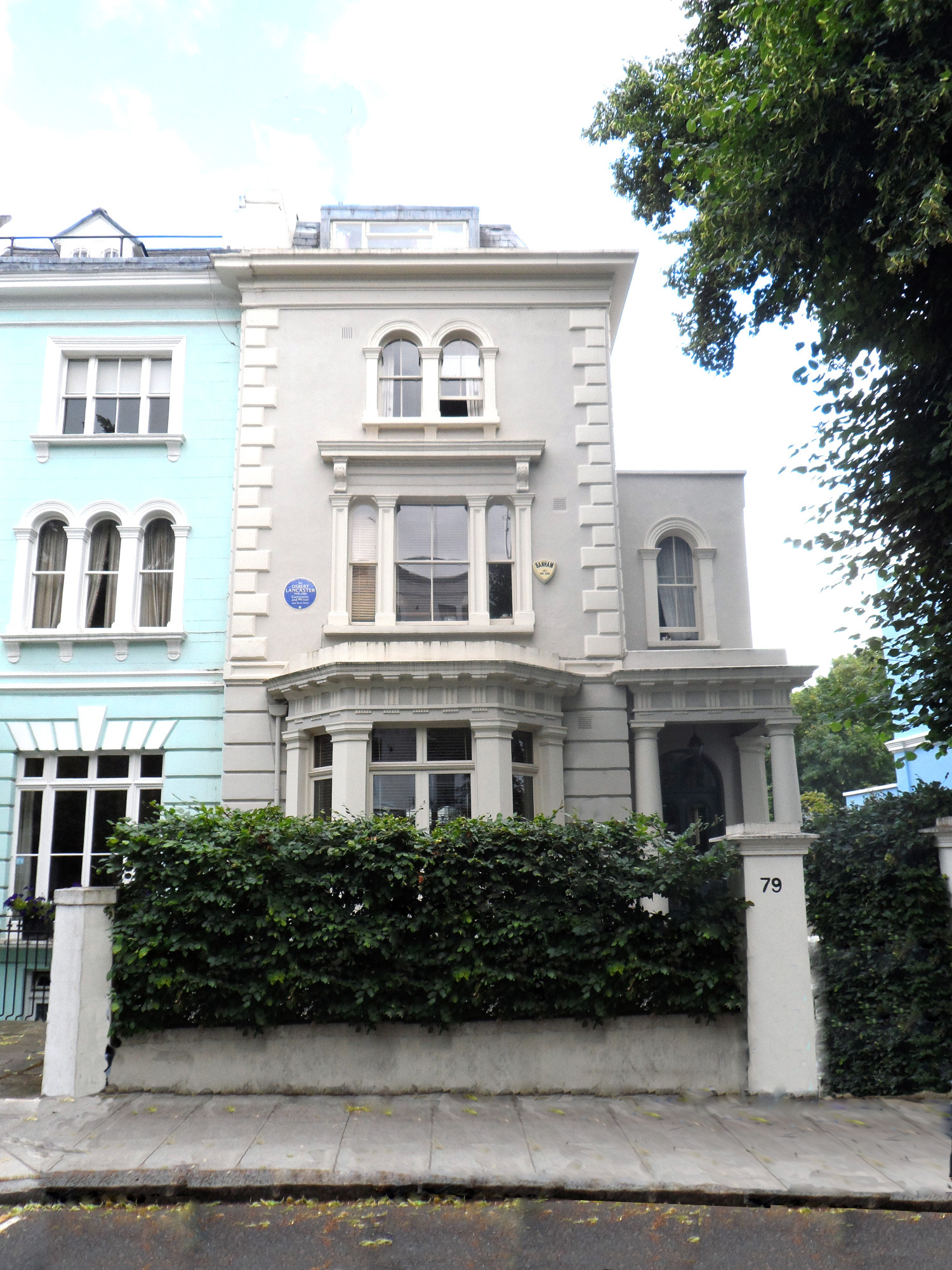
Lancaster's birthplace, Elgin Crescent, with blue plaque commemorating him

Elgin Crescent, Notting Hill, where Lancaster was born and raised, was an upper-middle class area. The family maintained a staff of servants, including a cook and a nurse. Such was the mixed nature of London in the early years of the 20th century that a short distance away were the deprived and dangerous Notting Dale and the Portobello Road, where, as Lancaster recalled in his 1953 memoirs, it was said to be impossible for a well-dressed man to walk and emerge intact. From an early age Lancaster was aware of the variety of classes, nationalities, and social attitudes around him.

In 1918 Lancaster was sent to St Ronan's preparatory school, Worthing. The régime at the school leaned heavily towards sport, in which he was neither interested nor proficient. The headmaster, Stanley Harris, was a celebrated amateur footballer and occasional first class cricketer, but he was reasonably tolerant of Lancaster's disdain for games, and on the whole Lancaster enjoyed his time at the school. His education there was, he later commented, of more importance to him than anything he learned later in his school and university career. He left St Ronan's in 1921, aged thirteen, and went to Charterhouse, where his father and uncles had all been sent. There he was shocked by the bullying and bad language, but in addition to its sporty, philistine "bloods", (Note: "Bloods" are defined by Lancaster's older contemporary Frank Harris as the ruling student caste, "who based their pretensions to ascendancy in college and university life on their prowess in sport and in athletics".) the school had an intellectual and aesthetic tradition. Lancaster's biographer Richard Boston writes, "The hearty Baden-Powell, for example, was offset by Ralph Vaughan Williams and Robert Graves, while talented Carthusian artists had included Thackeray, Leech, Lovat Fraser and Max Beerbohm". The art master, P. J. ("Purple") Johnson, encouraged Lancaster, insisting that a sound technique was a prerequisite for effective self-expression in drawing or painting; in that respect the boy's time at the school was valuable, though otherwise the headmaster found him "irretrievably gauche ... a sad disappointment". Lancaster shared Beerbohm's view that being an old boy of the school was more pleasurable than being a pupil there. (Note: Lancaster's retrospective pride in Charterhouse did not extend to sending his son there: he broke with the family tradition and sent him to Eton.)

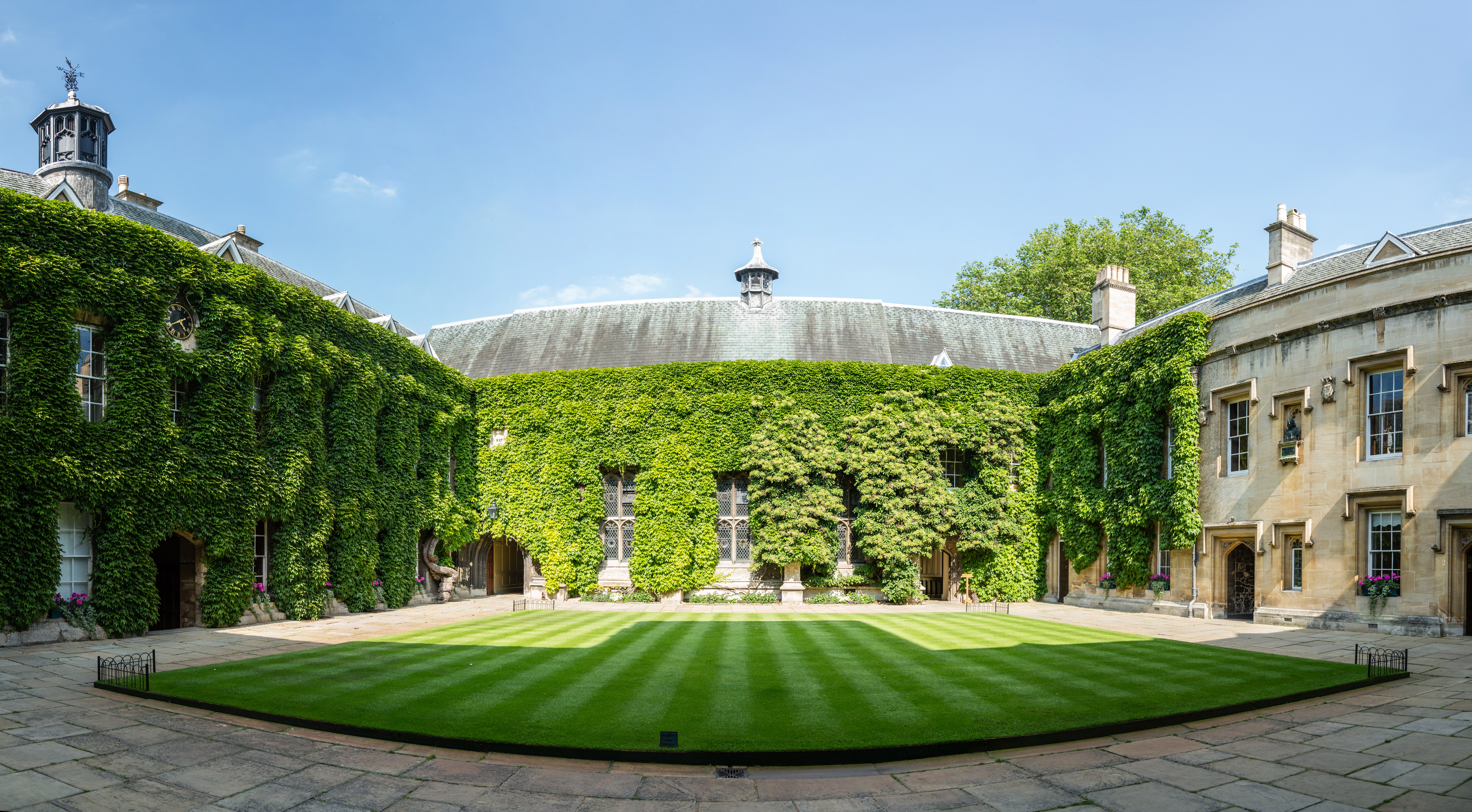
Lincoln College, Oxford

At the age of seventeen Lancaster passed his final school examinations and gained entrance to Lincoln College, Oxford, to study history. He persuaded his mother to allow him to leave Charterhouse at once, giving him several months between school and university, during which he enrolled on a course of life classes at the Byam Shaw School of Art in London. In October 1926 he started at Oxford. There, as at Charterhouse, he found two camps in which some students chose to group themselves: the "hearties" presented themselves as aggressively heterosexual and anti-intellectual; the "aesthetes" had a largely homosexual membership. Lancaster followed his elder contemporary Kenneth Clark in being contentedly heterosexual but nonetheless one of the aesthetes, and he was accepted as a leading member of their set. He cultivated the image of an Edwardian dandy, with large moustache, a monocle and check suits, modelling his persona to a considerable degree on Beerbohm, whom he admired greatly. He also absorbed some characteristics of the Oxford don Maurice Bowra; Lancaster's friend James Lees-Milne commented, "Bowra's influence over Osbert was marked, to the extent that he adopted the guru's booming voice, explosive emphasis of certain words and phrases, and habit in conversation of regaling his audiences with rehearsed witticisms and gossip." Lancaster's undergraduate set included Stephen Spender, Randolph Churchill, and most importantly John Betjeman, who became a close friend and lifelong influence.

Lancaster tried rowing with the Oxford University Boat Club, but quickly discovered he was no more suited to that than he had been to field games at school. He joined the Oxford University Dramatic Society (OUDS), acted in supporting roles, designed programme covers, wrote, and choreographed. He contributed prose and drawings to Isis and Cherwell magazines, engaged in student pranks, (Note: Lancaster's first appearance in the columns of The Times was in May 1928 when he and five other undergraduates were fined for staging a spoof duel in Christ Church Meadow.) staged an exhibition of his pictures, (Note: Together with a fellow undergraduate, Angus Malcolm, Lancaster presented "Mares and Nightmares" in Oxford in May 1929. It was reported in The Daily Express – his first appearance in the paper for which he later worked for more than forty years.) attended life classes, and became established as a major figure in the Oxonian social scene. All these diversions led him to neglect his academic work. He had made things more difficult for himself by switching from the history course to English after his first year, a decision he regretted once confronted with the rigours of compulsory Anglo-Saxon, which he found incomprehensible. (Note: In later life Lancaster recalled with horror the moment in his viva "when a particularly aggressive female don thrust at me a piece of Anglo-Saxon unseen, of which the only intelligible words were 'Jesus Christ', which I promptly and brightly translated, leaving her with the unfortunate impression, as they were followed by unbroken silence, that I had employed them expletively.") Making a belated effort, he extended his studies from the usual three years to four, and graduated with a fourth-class degree in 1930.

=== 1930s ===
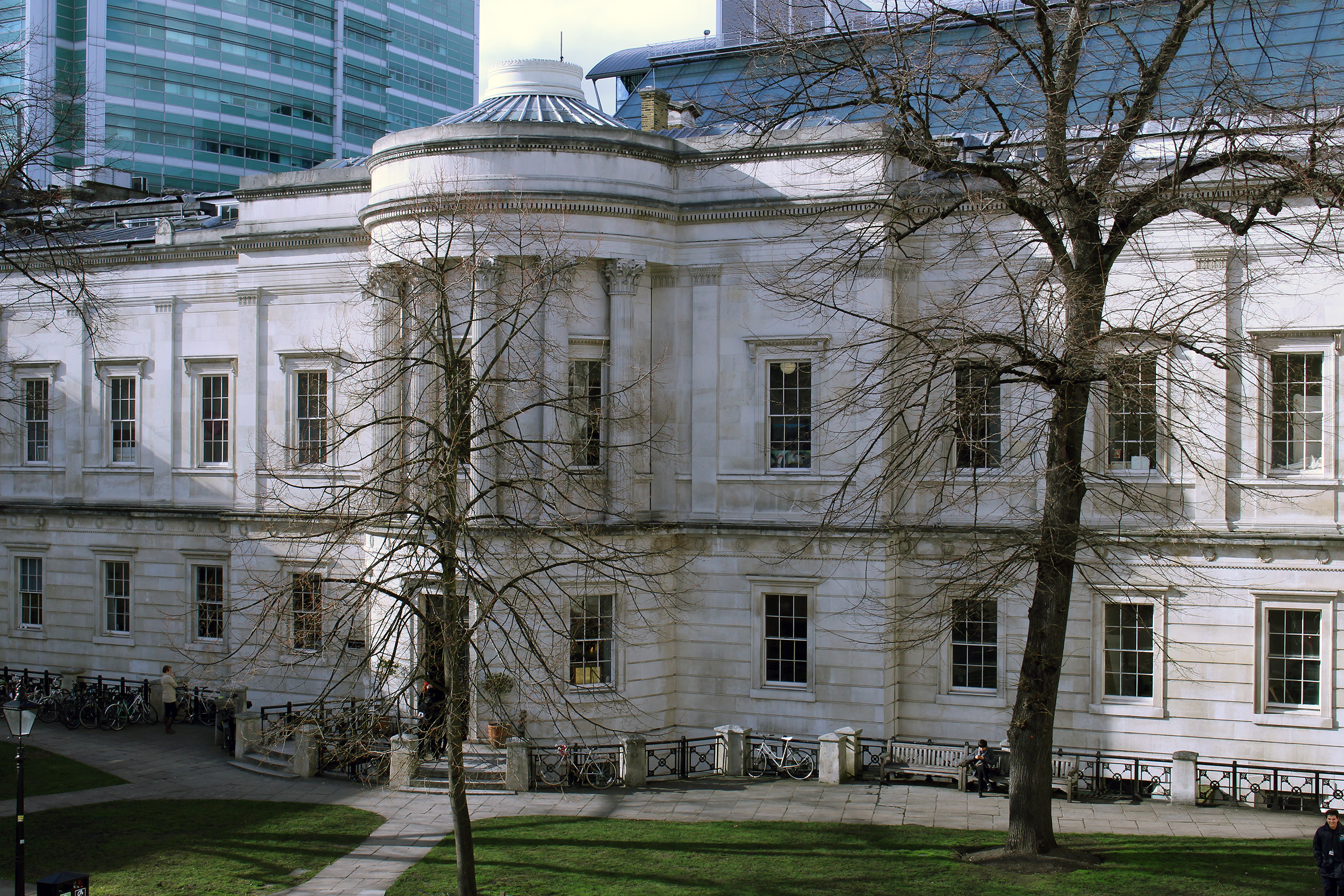
Slade School of Fine Art, London, where Lancaster studied from 1931 to 1933

Lancaster's family believed that art was a suitable hobby but an unacceptable profession; (Note: As a warning against art as a career, Lancaster's Uncle Jack recalled being at Charterhouse with a boy who did wonderful drawings, but who had come to nothing. The boy, it turned out, was Max Beerbohm. Boston writes that although Beerbohm and Lancaster got to know each other quite well, "Osbert never found quite the right moment to tell [him] the story".) they agreed that the best career for him would be the law. He dutifully attended a crammer and joined the Middle Temple, but repeatedly failed his law examinations. His studies were abruptly bought to an end by his health. A chest ailment was diagnosed as possibly tubercular, and he was sent to a sanatorium in Switzerland. After three months he was declared fit, and following a holiday in Venice – a lifelong love and aesthetic influence – he returned to England in 1931. He abandoned all thoughts of becoming a lawyer and enrolled full-time at the Slade School of Art in London.

At the Slade, Lancaster enjoyed most of his classes, but particularly those in stage design run by Vladimir Polunin, who had been Diaghilev's chief scene-painter and had worked with Picasso. Among Polunin's students was Karen Harris, daughter of the banker Sir Austin Harris. Lancaster fell in love with her; his feelings were reciprocated, but she was only seventeen and her parents thought her too young to marry. At first they were cautious about Lancaster's suitability as a husband and provider, but they came to approve of him. He and Karen were married in June 1933. They had two children: Cara (born 1934) and William (born 1938); the former became a stage manager, the latter, an anthropologist.

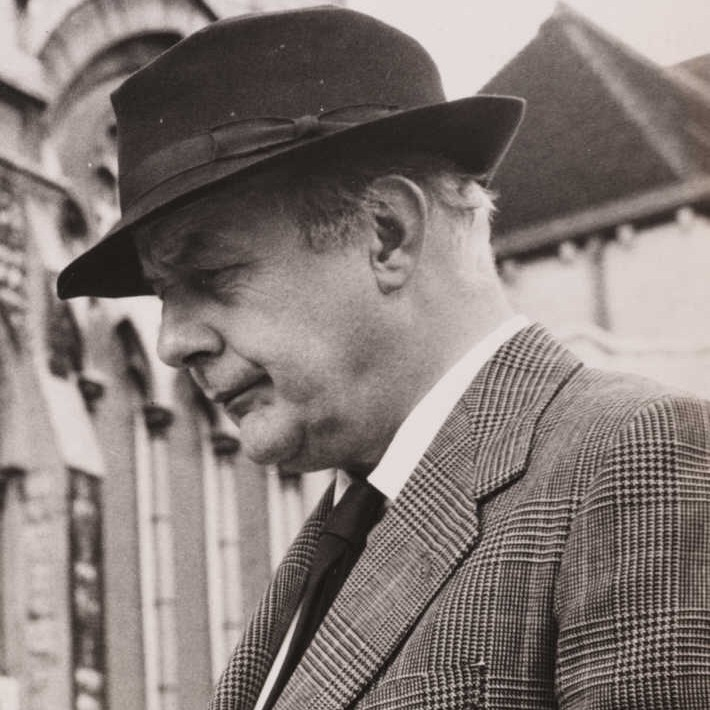
John Betjeman, Lancaster's lifelong friend and fellow campaigner

Lancaster earned a living as a freelance artist, producing advertising posters, Christmas cards, book illustrations and a series of murals for a hotel. In 1934 he secured a regular post with The Architectural Review, which was owned by a family friend and of which Betjeman was assistant editor. The magazine had a reputation as "the mouthpiece of the modernist movement", employing leading proponents such as Ernő Goldfinger and Nikolaus Pevsner. Despite describing the Bauhaus style as "balls", Lancaster was not anti-modernist, but he joined Betjeman and Robert Byron in advancing the countervailing value of more traditional architecture. Chief among his many activities for The Architectural Review was reviewing books, particularly those on art. His biographer James Knox comments that Lancaster's taste was already assured, appreciating the diverse gifts of contemporary artists including Edward Burra, Giorgio de Chirico, Edward Wadsworth and Paul Nash.

Knox singles out as Lancaster's most lasting contribution to the magazine a series of illustrated satires on planning and architecture, under the title Progress at Pelvis Bay. The collected articles were turned into a book, under the same title, published in 1936. It lampooned greedy and philistine property development in a typical seaside resort. Reviewing the book in The Observer, Simon Harcourt-Smith wrote, "Mr Lancaster spares us no horrifying detail of the borough's development ... [his] admirable drawings complete the picture of progress and desolation. I hope that every local authority and real-estate developer will be compelled to read this ghoulish little book." Lancaster followed this with Pillar to Post (1938), a lighthearted book with roughly equal amounts of text and drawings, aiming to demystify architecture for the intelligent lay person. The architectural scholar Christopher Hussey remarked on the author's inventive coinage of terms for period styles such as "Banker's Georgian", "Stockbroker's Tudor" and "By-pass Variegated", and described the book as both perceptive and shrewd.

In 1938 Lancaster agreed to help Betjeman write a series of articles for The Daily Express. He became friendly with the paper's features editor, John Rayner, who responded positively to Lancaster's praise of "the little column-width cartoons" popular in the French press but not, so far, seen in British papers. Rayner dubbed them "pocket cartoons" after the pocket battleships then much in the news, and invited Lancaster to contribute some. The first appeared on 3 January 1939. (Note: Boston (p. 107) gives the date as 1 January, but The Daily Express was not published on that date (a Sunday); the first pocket cartoon appeared on page 4 of the paper on Tuesday 3 January. It alluded to the recent New Year Honours, depicting a grandee weighed down by the many medals and decorations on his chest, saying, "any additional honour is merely an added burden.") The early cartoons accompanied the "William Hickey" gossip column; later they were promoted to a front-page slot, where they remained a regular feature, with only brief interruptions, for more than forty years, totalling about 10,000. The popularity of Lancaster's cartoons led to attempts by other papers, including The Times, to lure him away from the Express, but he resisted them. Although he thought the Express's proprietor, Lord Beaverbrook, "an old brute" and "a bastard", he found him "an ideal employer as far as I was concerned: he left one's work absolutely alone". (Note: Beaverbrook, who was known for lacking a sense of humour, did not find Lancaster's cartoons funny, but recognised that, like the Express's zany "Beachcomber" column, they were not only popular but also made his paper distinctive from its rival, The Daily Mail.)

=== Second World War ===
Shortly after the outbreak of war, Lancaster joined the Ministry of Information. He spoke good French and German, and because of that and his journalistic experience, he was recruited by the section handling British propaganda overseas. Several other prominent figures were members of the section and there were many clashes of egos and few tangible achievements. (Note: Lancaster described the section to his friend and publisher John Murray as "a rest home for intellectuals ... quite a considerable band of stalwarts pledged to maintain the highest traditions of undergraduate life of the roaring Twenties".) In July 1941, Lancaster was transferred to the Foreign Office's news department. (Note: Among his colleagues was Guy Burgess. Lancaster, observing that "when in his cups [Burgess] made no bones about working for the Russians", later warned another public servant that Burgess was unreliable. The recipient of Lancaster's warning was Kim Philby, who, as a fellow member of Burgess's spy ring, already knew more about the question than Lancaster supposed.) His duties included giving daily news briefings to other public servants and the British press, monitoring German propaganda broadcasts, and drawing caricatures for leaflets in German, Dutch and French for aerial drops in enemy-held territory.

The pocket cartoons made Osbert a national figure. They caught the mood of the nation, defiantly facing adversity with good humour. In a time of peril they gave people something to laugh about. Though they were small in size, their contribution to national morale was enormous.

— Richard Boston

In addition to his official duties Lancaster was art critic for The Observer between 1942 and 1944, and continued to contribute the pocket cartoons to the Express; from 1943 he also drew a large weekly cartoon for its sister newspaper, The Sunday Express, under the pen-name "Bunbury". (Note: An example of Lancaster's "Bunbury" style is a cartoon from August 1944, showing the Vichy leaders, Pétain and Laval, attempting to flee Paris and being confronted by the ghost of the executed Louis XVI, head under his arm, saying, "Going my way?".) Despite the wartime shortage of paper, the publisher John Murray produced a collection of the pocket cartoons every year from 1940 to 1944.

In December 1944, the war approaching its end, Lancaster was posted to Greece as press attaché to the British embassy in Athens. After the occupying Germans had withdrawn, opposing factions brought the country to the brink of civil war. Fearing a communist takeover, the British government supported Georgios Papandreou, prime minister of the former government-in-exile, now precariously in power in Athens, backed by British troops. When Papandreou's police fired on a civilian demonstration in full view of the world's press, British support for him came under international pressure. The British embassy, at which Lancaster arrived on 12 December, was the target for gunfire from various anti-government groups, and he joined the ambassador (Reginald Leeper), the British Minister Resident in the Mediterranean (Harold Macmillan) and a staff virtually under siege.

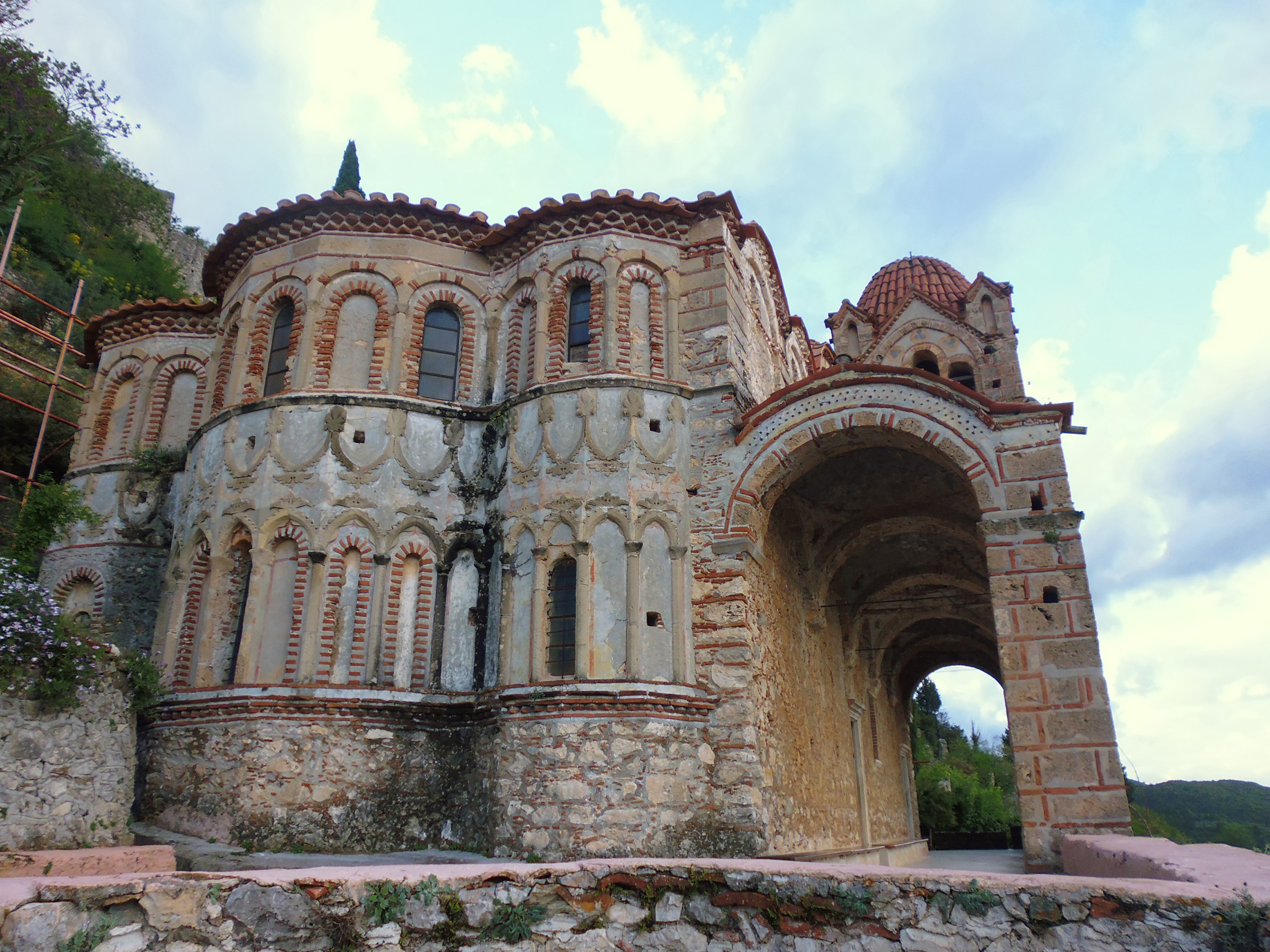
Pantanassa Monastery, Mystras about which Lancaster wrote in Sailing to Byzantium (1969)

Following an initiative by Macmillan and the personal intervention of Winston Churchill, a new government took office in Athens acceptable to all sides, and peace was briefly restored, in January 1945. Lancaster's task was then to restore trust and good relations between Britain – its government, embassy and military – and the international press corps. In this he was generally thought to have succeeded. After that, he took the opportunity of travelling in the country beyond Athens during the months before civil strife returned in 1946. He explored Attica, Boeotia and Arcadia, and also visited Thessaly, Epirus and some of the islands. He fell in love with Greece, which he revisited repeatedly throughout the rest of his life. During his excursions in 1945 and 1946 he sketched continually, and the results were published with his accompanying text as Classical Landscape with Figures in 1947. Boston describes it as "an unflinching but lyrical account of the conditions of post-war Greece"; The Times called it "a fine work of scholarship" as well as "an outstanding picture book".

=== Post-war ===
During the three years between his return from Greece and the end of the decade, Lancaster published two more books, one a comic story originally written for his children, The Saracen's Head, and the other a further satirical book about architecture and planning, Drayneflete Revealed. In 1947–48 he was the Sydney Jones Lecturer in Art at Liverpool University, following earlier appointees including Sir Herbert Read, W. G. Constable, Frank Lambert and H. S. Goodhart-Rendel.

The 1951 Festival of Britain gave Lancaster new opportunities to expand his artistic scope. Despite the hostility to the festival shown by his main employer, Beaverbrook, Lancaster was a major contributor. He and his friend John Piper were commissioned to design the centrepiece of the Festival Gardens on the south bank of the Thames. Boston describes it as "a 250-yard succession of pavilions, arcades, towers, pagodas, terraces, gardens, lakes and fountains, in styles that included Brighton Regency, Gothic and Chinese". The main site of the festival, around the new Royal Festival Hall, was intended to convey the spirit of modernist architecture; the gardens were designed to evoke the atmosphere of Georgian pleasure gardens, such as Vauxhall and Ranelagh.

It was to be a place of "elegant fun" with a dance hall, amusement park, shopping parade, restaurants, pubs and a wine garden. Osbert was ideally equipped to follow this brief.

— James Knox on the Festival Gardens

The gardens attracted about eight million visitors during the 1951 festival. The Manchester Guardian called them "a masterpiece ... fantasy on fantasy, red and gold and blue and green, a labyrinth of light-hearted absurdity".

Lancaster's association with Piper led to a second departure in his professional career: stage design. In connexion with the Festival of Britain, Sadler's Wells Ballet mounted a new work, Pineapple Poll by John Cranko, and approached Piper to design it. He could not take the commission and recommended his colleague. This was an opportunity Lancaster had keenly awaited since he was eleven, when his mother took him to see Diaghilev's production of The Sleeping Beauty. He recalled "the dazzling beauty of the Bakst sets and the intensity of my own response ... There and then I formed an ambition that was not destined to be fulfilled for more than thirty years". Cranko's exuberant ballet was an immediate success – "the hit of the season", in Knox's phrase – and turned Lancaster into one of the country's most sought-after theatre designers. During the rest of the 1950s and the 1960s his costumes and scenery were seen in new productions at Covent Garden, Glyndebourne, the Old Vic, Aldeburgh and in the West End.

Although he had provided drawings for a few books by other authors in the 1930s it was not until after the war that Lancaster was continually in demand as an illustrator. He illustrated or designed covers for a wide range of books, both fiction and non-fiction. His commissions included drawings for works by friends such as Nancy Mitford, Alan Moorehead and Anthony Powell; for best-sellers including C. Northcote Parkinson and P. G. Wodehouse; and for other modern authors including Ruth McKenney, Violet Powell, Simon Raven and Virginia Graham. He also illustrated new editions of classic works by authors from Shakespeare to Beerbohm, Hilaire Belloc and Saki.

=== Later years: 1960–1986 ===
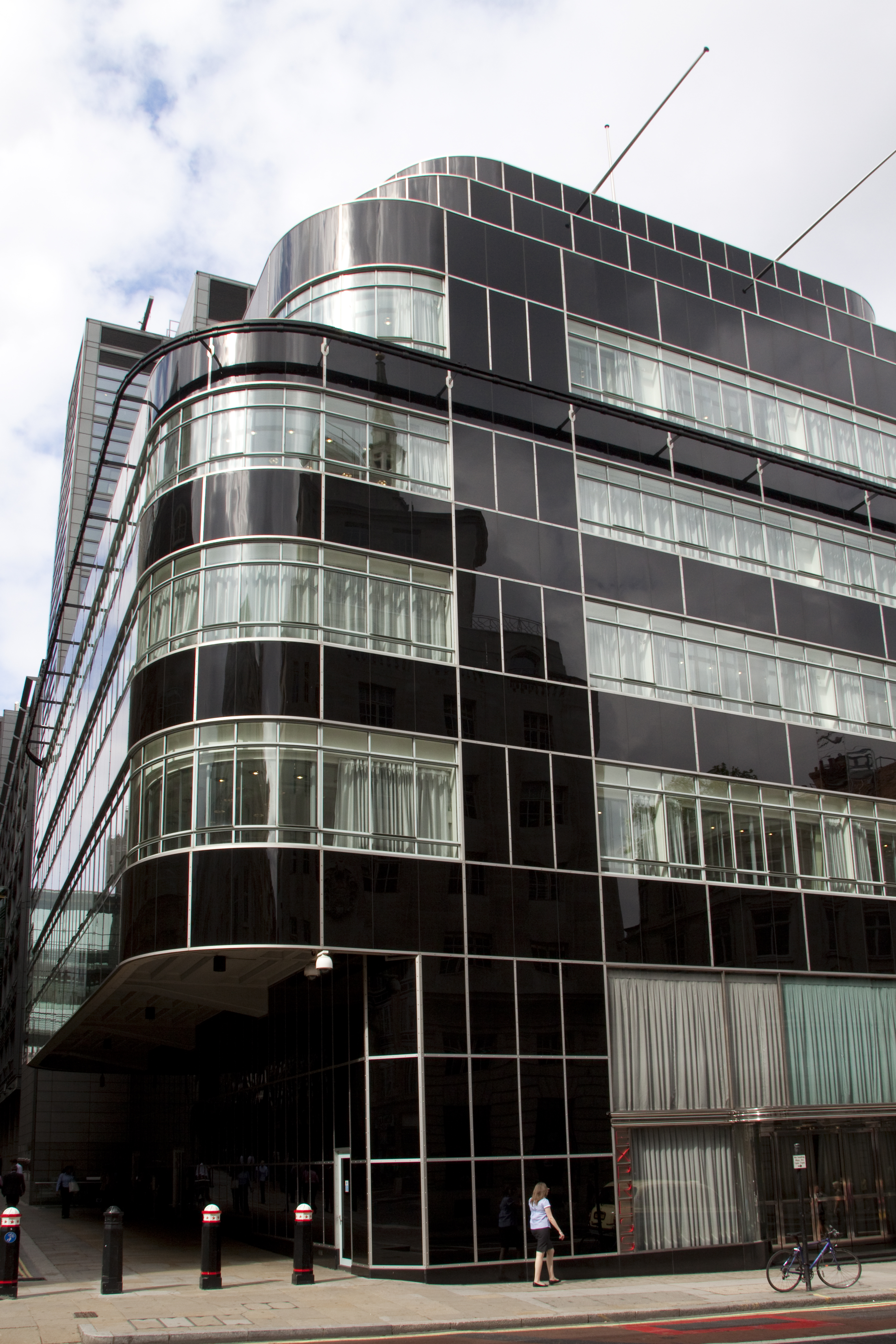
Daily Express building in Fleet Street

In Osbert: A Portrait of Osbert Lancaster, Boston comments that after the dramatic events in Athens his subject's later life was uneventful and industrious with "a somewhat dismaying dearth of rows, intrigues, scandals or scrapes to report." The Lancasters had a Georgian house in Henley-on-Thames, and a flat in Chelsea, where they lived from Mondays to Fridays. He worked at home in the mornings, on illustrations, stage designs, book reviews and any other commissions, before joining his wife for a midday dry martini and finally dressing and going to one of his clubs for lunch. (Note: He was a member of Pratt's, the Beefsteak, the Garrick, and, until it was disbanded in 1978, the St James's.) After that he would walk to the Express building in Fleet Street at about four in the afternoon. There he would gossip with his colleagues before sitting at his desk smoking furiously, producing the next day's pocket cartoon. By about half-past six he would have presented the cartoon to the editor and be ready for a drink at El Vino's across the road, and then the evening's social events.

Karen Lancaster died in 1964. They were markedly different in character, she quiet and home-loving, he extrovert and gregarious, but they were devoted to each other, and her death left him devastated. Three years later he married the journalist Anne Scott-James; they had known each other for many years, although at first she did not much like him, finding him "stagey" and "supercilious". By the 1960s they had become good friends, and after Karen died the widowed Lancaster and the divorced Scott-James spent increasing amounts of time together. Their wedding was at the Chelsea Register Office on 2 January 1967. After their marriage they kept his Chelsea flat, and lived at weekends in her house in the Berkshire village of Aldworth, the house in Henley having been sold.

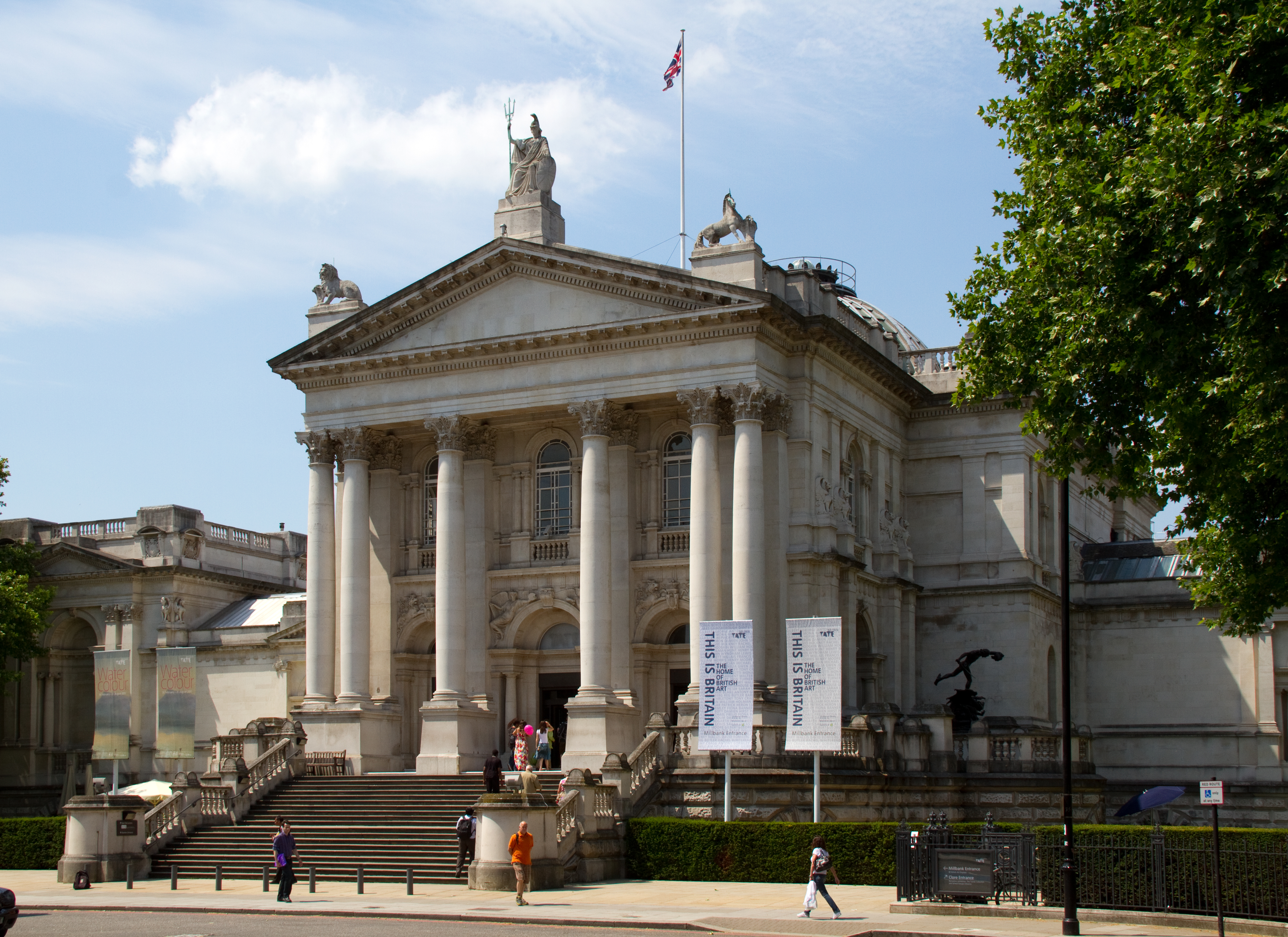
Tate Gallery portico, saved from demolition after campaigning by Lancaster and others

Though generally a commentator rather than a campaigner, Lancaster made an exception for the protection of Britain's architectural heritage, where he became a leader of public opinion. The historian Jerry White has written that the demolition of the Euston Arch in London in 1962 alerted the general public that "without vigilance and sturdy resistance, London was in danger of losing its landmarks one by one, in the interests of either profit or a misconceived public weal". Lancaster had been pressing this point since before the war. In 1967 he was appointed to the Greater London Council's Historic Buildings advisory committee, joining Betjeman, Pevsner and Sir John Summerson. They played a major role in defeating the Labour government's plans to demolish the front of the Tate Gallery. In 1973, with Betjeman and others of like mind Lancaster campaigned against the Conservative government's imposition of entry charges to hitherto free galleries and museums; the charges caused admissions to drop drastically, and were soon abolished.

In June 1975 Lancaster was knighted in the Queen's Birthday Honours. He and his wife collaborated on The Pleasure Garden (1977), a history of the British garden. Although great gardens such as Stowe were given full coverage, her text and his drawings did not neglect more modest efforts: "The suburban garden is the most important garden of the 20th century and there is no excuse other than ignorance for using the word 'suburban' in a derogatory sense". The following year Lancaster was made a Royal Designer for Industry (RDI) by the Royal Society of Arts, a distinction in which his predecessors had included the artist and architect Hugh Casson; the typographer Eric Gill; Charles Holden, London Transport's architect; Barnes Wallis, the wartime engineer; and a modernist architect with whom Lancaster had vigorously crossed swords, Sir Basil Spence. There would not be another theatre designer RDI until Stefanos Lazaridis in 2003. In 1978 Lancaster suffered the first of a series of strokes, and his health began a slow decline. He designed no more for the theatre, drew his last pocket cartoon for the Express in May 1981, and published his last collection, The Life and Times of Maudie Littlehampton the following year.

Lancaster died at his Chelsea flat on 27 July 1986, aged 77. He was buried with previous generations of his family in the churchyard at West Winch. A memorial service was held at St Paul's, Covent Garden in October 1986.

== Works ==
=== Architectural history and comment ===
Lancaster's illustration of "Baroque", with curled columns and fanciful statuary

In 2008 the architectural historian Gavin Stamp described Lancaster's Pillar to Post (1938) – later revised and combined with the sequel Homes Sweet Homes (1939) – as "one of the most influential books on architecture ever published – and certainly the funniest". Lancaster felt that architects and architectural writers had created a mystique that left the lay person confused, and in the two books he set out to demystify the subject, with, he said, "a small mass of information leavened by a large dose of personal prejudice." (Note: By the time the two books were revised and republished in 1959 he had modified some of his earlier views – his inclination to mock Victorian gothic architecture in general and John Ruskin in particular had diminished – but he left his original text largely unchanged. He did so, he said, because although he was conscious of being older he was not sure he was any wiser.)

From an early age Lancaster had been fascinated by architecture. He recalled his first trip to Venice and the "staggering" view of San Giorgio Maggiore from the Piazzetta, and as a young man he went on what he described as "church crawls" with Betjeman. His concern for architectural heritage led him to write and draw what Knox describes as "a series of architectural polemics in the guise of disarming 'picture books'". Harold Nicolson said of Lancaster's work in this sphere, "Under that silken, sardonic smile there lies the zeal of an ardent reformer ... a most witty and entertaining book. But it is more than that. It is a lucid summary of a most important subject". Four of Lancaster's books are in this category: Progress at Pelvis Bay lampoons insensitive planners and avaricious developers; Pillar to Post illustrates and analyses the exteriors of buildings from ancient times to the present; Homes Sweet Homes does the same for the interiors. Drayneflete Revealed is in the same vein as Progress at Pelvis Bay. In all these Lancaster employs something of the technique he prescribed for stage design: presenting a slightly heightened version of reality. The twisted columns in the "Baroque" section are not drawn directly from actual baroque buildings, but are the artist's distillation of the many examples he has seen and sketched. By such means, he set out to make the general public aware of good buildings, and "the present lamentable state of English architecture".

Lancaster's sketches and paintings in and around Greece are rarely satirical; they are a record of his love for, and careful scrutiny of the country. When his contempt for tyranny prevented him from visiting Greece while it was under military rule he went instead to Egypt, Sudan, Lebanon and Syria, always with a large sketchbook, in which he wrote and drew. From these sketches he produced Classical Landscape with Figures (1947), Sailing to Byzantium: An Architectural Companion (1969) and, in a different vein, Scene Changes (1978), in which he ventured into writing poetry to accompany his drawings. (Note: Kingsley Amis praised Lancaster's skill as a writer of verse, and its "easy and utterly individual mastery".) Dilys Powell, a well-known Hellenophile, wrote that Lancaster was "one of the few who could make a joke about the Greeks without giving offence; he was devoted to Greece; he was born to celebrate her".

=== Cartoons ===
The regular cast of the pocket cartoons, led by Maudie Littlehampton, in round glasses; Mrs Rajagojollibarmi talking to Willy Littlehampton, top right; Great-Aunt Edna in front of them; the Canon on the back row, glowering; Father O'Bubblegum at the drinks table, where Maudie's bibulous Uncle Eustace (rose in buttonhole, nose in glass) has preceded him

Although the Beaverbrook papers were editorially right-wing, Lancaster was never pressured into following a party line. His inclination was to satirise the government of the day, regardless of party, and he felt that his overtly partisan colleagues such as David Low and Vicky were constrained by their political allegiances. He wrote, "It is not the cartoonist's business to wave flags and cheer as the procession passes; his allotted role is that of the little boy who points out that the Emperor is stark naked".

In the late 1940s Lancaster developed a repertory company of characters in whose mouths he put his social and political jokes. The star character was Maudie, Countess of Littlehampton, who managed to be shrewd and flighty simultaneously. She began as what her creator called "a slightly dotty class symbol", but developed into "a voice of straightforward comment which might be my own". Maudie's political views were eclectic: "on some matters she is far to the right of Mr Enoch Powell, and on others well to the left of Mr Michael Foot". Her comments on the fads and peculiarities of the day caught the public imagination; the art historian Bevis Hillier calls her "an iconic figure to rank with Low's Colonel Blimp and Giles's Grandma". Various candidates have been proposed as the model for Maudie, (Note: They include Patsy, wife of the second Lord Jellicoe, Maureen, Countess of Dufferin and Ava, an ex-actress, Pru Wallace, with whom Lancaster had been briefly emotionally entangled in Athens, and Anne Scott-James, whom Lancaster had known for many years before their marriage in 1967.) but Lancaster maintained that she was not based on any one real person.

Other regular characters included Maudie's dim but occasionally perceptive husband Willy; two formidable dowagers: the Littlehamptons' Great-Aunt Edna, and Mrs Frogmarch, a middle-class Tory activist; (Note: A Times profile in 1982 and The Daily Telegraph's obituary in 1986 both featured a much-reproduced 1961 pocket cartoon in which Mrs Frogmarch, rising at a public meeting, asks, "Am I correct in assuming that membership of the Common Market will entitle this country to the free and unrestricted use of the guillotine?") Canon Fontwater, a personification of the Church Militant; Mrs Rajagojollibarmi, an Asian politician; and Father O'Bubblegum, Fontwater's Roman Catholic opposite number; they are seen in the illustration to the right, from the 1975 collection Liquid Assets. Lancaster's younger contemporary Mark Boxer remarked on the way some characters such as the Canon had developed "square characteristics to fit into the shape of the cartoon box". In his wartime cartoons Lancaster often caricatured Mussolini and Hitler; later he rarely portrayed current politicians, although Knox includes a few pocket cartoons from the 1960s in which General de Gaulle, Harold Wilson and others appear. Richard Nixon featured in a few pocket cartoons during the Watergate scandal; in one he is drawn standing by a flushing lavatory, saying innocently, "Tapes? What tapes?"

The novelist Anthony Powell commented that Lancaster, having carefully invented and stylised his own persona – "bristling moustache, check suits, shirt and tie in bold tints" – created similarly stylised characters for his cartoons, achieving "the traditional dramatic effectiveness of a greatly extended cast for a commedia dell'arte performance".

=== Stage design ===
Lancaster's "surreal and stylized" costumes and sets for La fille mal gardée (1960), providing "an idealized, pastoral context"

Lancaster's career designing for the theatre began and ended with Gilbert and Sullivan. His first costumes and scenery were for the Sadler's Wells Ballet's Pineapple Poll (1951), John Cranko's ballet with a story based on a Gilbert poem and music by Sullivan. His last were for the D'Oyly Carte Opera Company's revival of The Sorcerer (1973). In between, he designed more productions for the Royal Ballet, as well as for Glyndebourne Festival Opera, the Old Vic and the West End. It was a matter of mild regret to him that of the twenty plays, operas and ballets that he designed between the two, only one was for a thoroughly serious piece, Britten's Peter Grimes, for the Bulgarian National Opera in Sofia in 1964.

Three of Lancaster's theatre designs have remained in use in 21st-century productions, all by the Royal Ballet: Pineapple Poll, La fille mal gardée and Coppélia. In an article on the second in 2016, Danielle Buckley wrote, "Lancaster's surrealist and stylized designs for Fille amplify the story's pantomime quality, and the exaggerated burlesque of its comedy – but the backdrops of fields that roll into the distance, bundles of hay, dreamy skies and village cottages provide the idealized, pastoral context that the story needs". Buckley adds that Lancaster's designs have been criticised for locating the ballet in no particular time or place – "except, that is, of a 1960s London view of idyllic country life".

Lancaster's stated view was that stage sets and costumes should reflect reality, but "through a lens, magnifying and slightly over-emphasising everything which it reflects". Sir Geraint Evans commented on how Lancaster's designs helped the performer: "[His] design for Falstaff was superb: it gave me clues to understanding the character, and reflected that marvellous, subtle sense of humour which was present in all his work."

== Character and views ==
Lancaster's old-fashioned persona, together with his choice of a countess as his principal cartoon mouthpiece, led some to assume his politics were on the right of the spectrum. But despite what he described as his strong traditionalist feelings he was a floating voter: "I've voted Tory and Labour in my time and I think once, in a moment of total mental aberration, voted Liberal." (Note: Boston comments that Lancaster's political views were encapsulated in a pocket cartoon at the time of the 1950 general election, depicting a young mother holding a baby and saying, "Oh, we're enjoying every minute of it – he's bitten the Tory, been sick over the Socialist, and now I can hardly wait to see what he's going to do to the Liberal".) He distrusted the Conservatives for what he saw as their persistent bias in favour of property developers and against conservation. He rarely let his own views show obviously in his cartoons, but his hatred of political oppression was reflected in his portrayal of fascist, communist and apartheid regimes, and he refused to go to his beloved Greece while the military junta was in power from 1967 to 1974. In religion he described himself as "a C of E man ... with that embarrassment induced in all right-thinking men by any mention of God outside church."

== Legacy, honours and reputation ==
=== Exhibitions ===
Apart from an exhibition as an undergraduate, Lancaster had four large-scale shows of his works. The first was in Norwich in 1955–56, when Betjeman opened an exhibition covering the range of Lancaster's output, including posters from the 1930s as well as cartoons, stage designs, watercolours and architectural drawings. In 1967 a London show concentrated on his costumes and scenery, with examples of work from plays, ballets, opera and, exceptionally, film (Those Magnificent Men in their Flying Machines, 1965). In 1973, at the instigation of Roy Strong, the National Portrait Gallery mounted "The Littlehampton Bequest", for which Lancaster painted portraits of Willy Littlehampton's supposed ancestors and offspring, in the style of artists down the centuries, from Holbein to Van Dyck and Lely, and then to Reynolds and Gainsborough and on to Sargent and Hockney. Strong wrote an introduction to the book Lancaster published of the collected portraits. To mark the centenary of Lancaster's birth, The Wallace Collection staged an exhibition titled Cartoons and Coronets: The Genius of Osbert Lancaster from October 2008 to January 2009. It was curated by James Knox, the editor and author of a lavishly illustrated biography and catalogue with the same title as the exhibition.

=== Honours ===
Lancaster's honours included his knighthood, his CBE in the 1953 Coronation Honours and an honorary D.Litt from Oxford, as well as honorary degrees from Birmingham (1964), Newcastle upon Tyne (1970), and St Andrews (1974).

=== Reputation ===
In 2008, the year of Lancaster's centenary, Peter York called him "A national treasure ... arguably Britain's most popular newspaper cartoonist, certainly our most effective, popular architectural historian and illustrator and one of the most inspired 20th-century theatre, opera and ballet designers." But York added that in recent years Lancaster had been largely forgotten: "People under 40 don't know him", as they still knew Betjeman from his many television programmes. The Oxford Companion to English Literature called Lancaster "a writer, artist, cartoonist, and theatre designer, whose many illustrated works gently mock the English way of life: he was particularly good at country‐house and upper‐class architecture and mannerisms, but also had a sharp eye for suburbia." The obituary in The Times described him as "the most polite and unsplenetic of cartoonists, he was never a crusader, remaining always a witty, civilized critic with a profound understanding of the vagaries of human nature." Sir Roy Strong wrote that Lancaster's cartoons were those "of a gentleman of the old school ... He never crossed into the brilliant savagery of Gerald Scarfe or Spitting Image. The one-liners in his pocket cartoons were Cowardesque".

Although he was much praised at the time – Anthony Powell said, "Osbert kept people going by his own high spirits and wit" (Note: Powell dedicated his novel, A Buyer's Market, to him.) – Lancaster was conscious that the work of a political cartoonist is ephemeral, and he did not expect longevity for his topical drawings. His legacy as a pocket cartoonist has been the genre itself; his successors in the national press have included Mel Calman, Michael Heath, Marc, Matt and Trog. Despite the topical nature of Lancaster's cartoons, they remain of interest to the historian; Lucie-Smith quotes a contemporary tribute by Moran Caplat: "No social history of this [20th] century will be complete without him. He has joined the handful of artists who, over the last three hundred years, have each in their time mirrored our nation."

The Times said of Lancaster's stage designs, "When the history of Glyndebourne comes to be written, high in the roll of honour will stand the name of Osbert Lancaster, who has the great gift of designing décor that invigorates every opera". But although theatre designs are less ephemeral than topical cartoons, in general they have a practical lifetime measured in years or at most a few decades. The survival of Lancaster's costumes and scenery for Pineapple Poll and La fille mal gardée into the 21st century is exceptional, and most of even his highest-praised productions for repertory works have been succeeded by new designs by artists from Hockney to Ultz.

Lancaster's prose style divided opinion. Betjeman teased him that it was "deliciously convoluted"; Boston and Knox both echo this view. But Beaverbrook's right-hand man, George Malcolm Thompson, said of Lancaster, "The annoying thing at the Express was that he was not only the only one who could draw; he could also write better than anyone in the building."

Lancaster's most enduring works have been his architectural books. Pillar to Post and its successors have been reissued in various editions, and at 2018 are in print as a boxed set entitled Cartoons, Columns and Curlicues, containing Pillar to Post, Homes Sweet Homes and Drayneflete Revealed. Reviewing the new edition in The Irish Times, Niall McGarrigle wrote, "The books are of their time, of course, but their legacy is part of the strong heritage culture that we rightly fight for today". Alan Powers wrote in The Financial Times, "At least old buildings are now cherished rather better, and the house fronts around Lancaster's birthplace in Notting Hill are jollied up in his favourite pinks and mauves ... now we understand that the compact streets and houses of the past provide the best opportunity for social encounters and save energy, and that even bad buildings can make us smile. For both of these revelations, we owe Osbert Lancaster a lot."

== Books by Lancaster ==
=== Autobiography ===
- All Done from Memory. London: John Murray. 1953. OCLC 41961553.
- With an Eye to the Future. London: John Murray. 1967. OCLC 470420503.

=== Architecture ===
- Progress at Pelvis Bay. London: John Murray. 1936. OCLC 806343579.
- Pillar to Post. London: John Murray. 1938. OCLC 59703720.
- Homes Sweet Homes. London: John Murray. 1939. OCLC 762059431.
- Classical Landscape with Figures. London: John Murray. 1947. OCLC 504056488.
- Façades and Faces. London: John Murray. 1951. OCLC 630417353.
- Drayneflete Revealed. London: John Murray. 1951. OCLC 931341391. Published in the US 1950 by Houghton and Mifflin, under the title There'll Always be a Drayneflete.
- Here of All Places: The Pocket Lamp of Architecture. London: John Murray. 1959. OCLC 932898972. Revised and expanded omnibus version of Pillar to Post and Homes Sweet Homes. Reissued 1975 as A Cartoon History of Architecture.
- Sailing to Byzantium: An Architectural Companion. London: John Murray. 1969. OCLC 310661367.
- Cartoons, Columns and Curlicues. London: Pimpernel Press. 2015. ISBN 978-1-910258-37-8. Boxed set containing reprints of Pillar to Post, Homes Sweet Homes and Drayneflete Revealed.

=== Cartoon collections ===
- Pocket Cartoons. London: John Murray. 1940. OCLC 314954570.
- New Pocket Cartoons. London: John Murray. 1941. OCLC 561763522.
- Further Pocket Cartoons. London: John Murray. 1942. OCLC 561763431.
- More Pocket Cartoons. London: John Murray. 1943. OCLC 500269028.
- Assorted Sizes. London: John Murray. 1944. OCLC 800790792.
- More and More Productions. London: Gryphon. 1948. OCLC 637116774.
- A Pocketful of Cartoons. London: Gryphon. 1949. OCLC 561763610.
- Lady Littlehampton and Friends. London: Gryphon. 1952. OCLC 613038890.
- Studies from the Life. London: Gryphon. 1954. OCLC 837847601.
- Tableaux Vivants. London: Gryphon. 1955. OCLC 940635955.
- Private Views. London: Gryphon. 1956. OCLC 2526266.
- The Year of the Comet. London: Gryphon. 1957. OCLC 654132764.
- Etudes. London: John Murray. 1958. OCLC 836387097.
- Signs of the Times. London: John Murray. 1961. OCLC 561763654.
- Mixed Notices. London: John Murray. 1963. OCLC 1017385147.
- Graffiti. London: John Murray. 1964. OCLC 2526270.
- A Few Quick Tricks. London: John Murray. 1965. OCLC 561763416.
- Fasten Your Safety Belts. London: John Murray. 1966. OCLC 836406884.
- Temporary Diversions. London: John Murray. 1968. OCLC 804812804.
- Recorded Live. London: John Murray. 1970. OCLC 1711645.
- Meaningful Confrontations. London: John Murray. 1971. OCLC 2526264.
- Theatre in the Flat. London: John Murray. 1972. ISBN 978-0-7195-2817-0.
- Liquid Assets. London: John Murray. 1975. ISBN 978-0-7195-3238-2.
- The Social Contract. London: John Murray. 1977. ISBN 978-0-7195-3439-3.
- Ominous Cracks. London: John Murray. 1979. ISBN 978-0-7195-3683-0.
- The Life and Times of Maudie Littlehampton, 1939–80. London: Penguin. 1982. OCLC 911979922.

=== Other ===
- Our Sovereigns: From Alfred to Edward VIII, 871–1936. London: John Murray. 1936. OCLC 7954562.
- The Saracen's Head, or The Reluctant Crusader. London: John Murray. 1948. OCLC 752970409.
- The Littlehampton Bequest. London: John Murray. 1973. ISBN 978-0-7195-2932-0.
- The Penguin Osbert Lancaster. Harmondsworth: Penguin. 1964. OCLC 600869.
- The Pleasure Garden. London: John Murray. 1977. ISBN 978-0-7195-3438-6. (co-written with Anne Scott-James)
- Scene Changes. London: John Murray. 1978. ISBN 978-0-87645-100-7.
- The Littlehampton Saga. London: Methuen. 1984. ISBN 978-0-413-54990-7. Omnibus edition of The Saracen's Head, Drayneflete Revealed and The Littlehampton Bequest. Reissued by Pimlico Press, 1992, ISBN 978-0-7126-5248-3.

== Stage designs by Lancaster ==
- Pineapple Poll, Sadler's Wells, 1951
- Bonne bouche, Covent Garden, 1952
- Love in a Village, English Opera Group, 1952
- High Spirits, Hippodrome, 1953
- The Rake's Progress, Edinburgh (for Glyndebourne), 1953
- All's Well That Ends Well, Old Vic, 1953
- Don Pasquale, Sadler's Wells, 1954
- Coppélia, Covent Garden, 1954
- Napoli, Festival Ballet, 1954
- Falstaff, Edinburgh (for Glyndebourne), 1955
- Hotel Paradiso, Winter Garden, 1956
- Zuleika, Saville, 1957
- L'italiana in Algeri, Glyndebourne, 1957
- Tiresias, English Opera Group, 1958
- Candide, Saville, 1959
- La fille mal gardée, Covent Garden, 1960
- She Stoops to Conquer, Old Vic, 1960
- La pietra del paragone, Glyndebourne, 1964
- Peter Grimes, Bulgarian National Opera, Sofia, 1964
- L'heure espagnole, Glyndebourne, 1966
- The Rising of the Moon, Glyndebourne, 1970
- The Sorcerer, D'Oyly Carte, 1971

Source: Who's Who

== Notes, references and sources ==
=== Sources ===
- Boston, Richard (1989). Osbert: A Portrait of Osbert Lancaster. London: Collins. ISBN 978-0-00-216324-8.
- Campbell, John (1993). Edward Heath: A Biography. London: Jonathan Cape. ISBN 978-0-224-02482-2.
- Catto, Jeremy; Ralph Evans; James McConica (1994). The History of the University of Oxford. Oxford: Clarendon Press. OCLC 901267012.
- Clark, Kenneth (1976). Another Part of the Wood: A Self-Portrait. London: John Murray. OCLC 901267012.
- Donnelly, Mark (1999). Britain in the Second World War. London: Routledge. ISBN 978-0-415-17426-8.
- Harris, Frank (1969) [1920]. Contemporary Portraits, Third Series. New York: Greenwood Press. OCLC 214336144.
- Haskell, Arnold; Mary Clarke (1958). The Ballet Annual: A Record and Year Book of the Ballet, Volume 12. London: Adam and Charles Black. OCLC 1643813.
- Horne, Alistair (2010). Macmillan: The Official Biography. London: Macmillan. ISBN 978-0-230-73881-2.
- Howard, Paul (2016). I Read the News Today, Oh Boy. London: Picador. ISBN 978-1-5098-0005-6.
- Knox, James (2008). Cartoons and Coronets: The Genius of Osbert Lancaster. London: Frances Lincoln. ISBN 978-0-7112-2938-9.
- Kuniholm, Bruce (2014). The Origins of the Cold War in the Near East. Princeton: Princeton University Press. ISBN 978-1-4008-5575-9.
- Lancaster, Osbert (1963) [1953]. All Done from Memory (second ed.). London: John Murray. OCLC 963633673.
- Lancaster, Osbert (1964). The Penguin Osbert Lancaster. Harmondsworth: Penguin. OCLC 600869.
- Lancaster, Osbert (1967). With an Eye to the Future. London: John Murray. OCLC 470420503.
- Lancaster, Osbert (1975). Liquid Assets. London: John Murray. ISBN 978-0-7195-3238-2.
- Lancaster, Osbert (1984). The Littlehampton Saga. London: Methuen. ISBN 978-0-413-54990-7.
- Lownie, Andrew (2016). Stalin's Englishman: The Lives of Guy Burgess. London: Hodder and Stoughton. ISBN 978-1-473-62738-3.
- Lucie-Smith, Edward (1988). The Essential Osbert Lancaster: An Anthology in Brush and Pen. London: Barrie and Jenkins. ISBN 978-0-7126-2036-9.
- Scott-James, Anne; Osbert Lancaster (1977). The Pleasure Garden. London: John Murray. ISBN 978-0-7195-3438-6.
- Stamp, Gavin (2013). Anti-Ugly: Excursions in English Architecture and Design. London: Aurum Press. ISBN 978-1-78131-123-3.
- Turner, Barry (2011). Beacon for Change: How the 1951 Festival of Britain Shaped the Modern Age. London: Aurum Press. ISBN 978-1-84513-721-2.
- Watkins, Alan (1982). Brief Lives: With Some Memoirs. London: Hamish Hamilton. ISBN 978-0-241-10890-1.
- White, Jerry (2016). London in the Twentieth Century: A City and its People. London: Random House. ISBN 978-1-84792-453-7.
