= Stockbroker's Tudor =

Style of house

Osbert Lancaster's drawing of Stockbroker's Tudor in Pillar to Post, 1938

Stockbroker's Tudor, sometimes alternatively Stockbrokers Tudor or Stockbroker Tudor, was a term coined by the architectural historian and cartoonist Osbert Lancaster for a style of house that became popular in Britain in the first half of the 20th century, employing pastiche Tudor features on the façades of houses, before and during the development of suburban Metroland.

== Style ==
In his 1938 book Pillar to Post: The Pocket Lamp of Architecture, Lancaster commented that although Tudor buildings were on the whole cramped and ill-lit, they were regarded by many in the early 20th century as picturesque: "so deep and so widespread was the … devotion to the olde-worlde that an enormous number of such houses were erected, at considerable expense". At first the expense restricted the style to the residences of well-off citizens such as stockbrokers, but later the invention of new and cheaper methods of construction brought the style within the reach of the builders of the large housing estates of Metroland – the commuter suburbs.

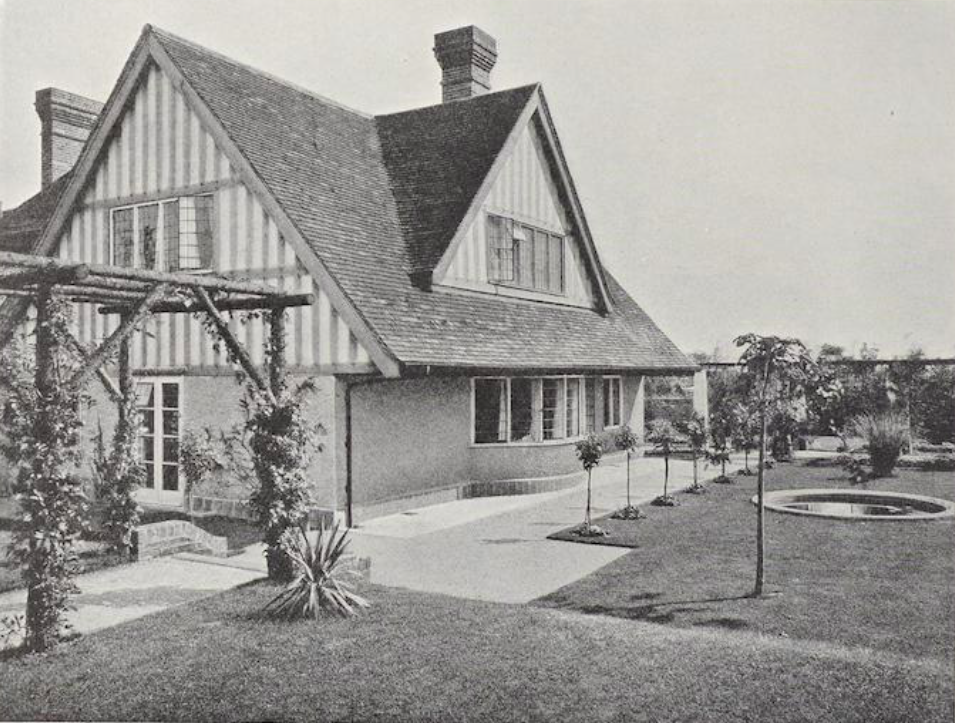
Marsham's Farm, Gerrard's Cross, new in 1912

Lancaster remarked that it was unnerving to be confronted with "a hundred and fifty accurate reproductions of Anne Hathaway’s cottage, each complete with central-heating and garage" and added that the latest methods of mass-production were being used to turn out "a stream of old oak beams, leaded window-panes and small discs of bottle-glass, all structural devices which our ancestors lost no time in abandoning as soon as an increase in wealth and knowledge enabled them to do so". In the sequel to Pillar to Post – Homes Sweet Homes, published in 1939 – Lancaster supplemented the drawing of the exterior with one of the interior, showing a bedroom with a four-post bed and timbered beams in the ceiling.

The term "Stockbroker's Tudor" became common usage and was later employed by Robert Graves in a social history of Britain and in books about architecture in countries other than the UK, as well as in the press of various countries. Examples of the style are also seen – and identified by Lancaster's term – in Australia, Canada, Ireland and the US. A 2015 study of American architecture comments that the style is "equated with stability, venerability, and success in society and business, due in no small part to the notoriety of the 'stockbroker Tudor' neighborhoods in New York City’s toniest suburbs".

== References and sources ==
=== Sources ===
- Ennals, Peter (1998). Homeplace: The Making of the Canadian Dwelling Over Three Centuries. Toronto: University of Toronto Press. ISBN 978-0-80-208160-5.
- Graves, Robert; Alan Hodge (1940). The Long Week-End. A Social History of Great Britain, 1918–1939. London: Faber & Faber. OCLC 869757213.
- Lancaster, Osbert (1938). Pillar to Post: The Pocket Lamp of Architecture. London: John Murray. OCLC 1150976101.
- Lancaster, Osbert (1948) [1939]. Homes, Sweet Homes. London: John Murray. OCLC 1126354190.
- Murphy, Kevin (2015). The Tudor Home. New York: Rizzoli. ISBN 978-0-84-784489-0.

=== Further reading ===
- Ballantyne, Andrew; Law, Andrew (2010). "Tudoresque Vernacular and the Self-Reliant Englishman". In Guillery, Peter (ed.). Built from Below: British Architecture and the Vernacular. Abingdon: Routledge. pp. 123–144. ISBN 9781136943157.
- Ballantyne, Andrew; Law, Andrew (2012). Tudoresque: In Pursuit of the Ideal Home. London: Reaktion Books. ISBN 9781780230160.
- Jackson, Alan A. (1973). Semi-Detached London: Suburban Development, Life and Transport, 1900–39. London: George Allen and Unwin. ISBN 9781351175128.
- Lyall, Sutherland (1988). Dream Cottages: From Cottage Ornée to Stockbroker Tudor: Two Hundred Years of the Cult of the Vernacular. London: Hale. ISBN 9780709032861.
- Maudlin, Daniel (2015). The Idea of the Cottage in English Architecture, 1760–1860. Abingdon: Routledge. ISBN 9781317643159.
- Scott, Peter (2013). The Making of the Modern British Home: The Suburban Semi and Family Life Between the Wars. Oxford: Oxford University Press. ISBN 9780199677207.
- Stamp, Gavin; Goulancourt, André (1986). The English House 1860–1914: The Flowering of English Domestic Architecture. London: Faber and Faber. ISBN 9780571130474.
- Stamp, Gavin (2006). "Neo-Tudor and Its Enemies". Architectural History. 49: 1–33. doi:10.1017/S0066622X00002690.
- Sugg Ryan, Deborah (2018). Ideal Homes, 1918–39: Domestic Design and Suburban Modernism. Manchester: Manchester University Press. ISBN 9781526126573.
