= List of English words of Arabic origin =

Arabic is a Semitic language and English is an Indo-European language. The following words have been acquired either directly from Arabic or else indirectly by passing from Arabic into other languages and then into English. Most entered one or more of the Indo-Iranian, Turkic and Romance languages, before entering English.

To qualify for this list, a word must be reported in etymology dictionaries as having descended from Arabic. A handful of dictionaries have been used as the source for the list. Words associated with the Islamic religion are omitted; for Islamic words, see Glossary of Islam. Archaic and rare words are also omitted. A bigger listing including words very rarely seen in English is at Wiktionary dictionary.

Given the number of words which have entered English from Arabic, this list is split alphabetically into sublists, as listed below:

- List of English words of Arabic origin (A-B)
- List of English words of Arabic origin (C-F)
- List of English words of Arabic origin (G-J)
- List of English words of Arabic origin (K-M)
- List of English words of Arabic origin (N-S)
- List of English words of Arabic origin (T-Z)
- List of English words of Arabic origin: Addenda for certain specialist vocabularies

== Addenda for certain specialist vocabularies ==
=== Arabic botanical names ===
The following plant names entered medieval Latin texts from Arabic. Today, in descent from the medieval Latin, they are international systematic classification names (commonly known as "Latin" names): Azadirachta, Berberis, Cakile, Carthamus, Cuscuta, Doronicum, Galanga, Musa, Nuphar, Ribes, Senna, Taraxacum, Usnea, Physalis alkekengi, Melia azedarach, Centaurea behen, Terminalia bellerica, Terminalia chebula, Cheiranthus cheiri, Piper cubeba, Phyllanthus emblica, Peganum harmala, Salsola kali, Prunus mahaleb, Datura metel, Daphne mezereum, Rheum ribes, Jasminum sambac, Cordia sebestena, Operculina turpethum, Curcuma zedoaria, Alpinia zerumbet + Zingiber zerumbet. (List incomplete.)

Over 90% of those botanical names were introduced to medieval Latin in a herbal medicine context. They include names of medicinal plants from Tropical Asia for which there had been no prior Latin or Greek name, such as azedarach, bellerica, cubeba, emblica, galanga, metel, turpethum, zedoaria and zerumbet. Another sizeable portion are ultimately Iranian names of medicinal plants of Iran. The Arabic-to-Latin translation of Ibn Sina's The Canon of Medicine helped establish many Arabic plant names in later medieval Latin. A book about medicating agents by Serapion the Younger containing hundreds of Arabic botanical names circulated in Latin among apothecaries in the 14th and 15th centuries. Medieval Arabic botany was primarily concerned with the use of plants for medicines. In a modern etymology analysis of one medieval Arabic list of medicines, the names of the medicines — primarily plant names — were assessed to be 31% ancient Mesopotamian names, 23% Greek names, 18% Persian, 13% Indian (often via Persian), 5% uniquely Arabic, and 3% Egyptian, with the remaining 7% of unassessable origin.

The Italian botanist Prospero Alpini stayed in Egypt for several years in the 1580s. He introduced to Latin botany from Arabic from Egypt the names Abrus, Abelmoschus, Lablab, Melochia, each of which designated plants that were unknown to Western European botanists before Alpini, plants native to tropical Asia that were grown with artificial irrigation in Egypt at the time.

In the early 1760s, Peter Forsskål systematically cataloged plants and fishes in the Red Sea area. For genera and species that did not already have Latin names, Forsskål used the common Arabic names as the scientific names. This became the international standard for most of what he cataloged. Forsskål's Latinized Arabic plant genus names include Aerva, Arnebia, Cadaba, Ceruana, Maerua, Maesa, Themeda, and others.

Some additional miscellaneous botanical names with Arabic ancestry include Abutilon, Alchemilla, Alhagi, Argania, argel, Averrhoa, Avicennia, azarolus + acerola, bonduc, lebbeck, Retama, seyal. (List incomplete).

=== Arabic textile words ===
The list includes the six textile fabric names: cotton, damask, gauze, macramé, mohair, & muslin; the three textile dye names: anil, crimson/kermes, and safflower; and the garment names: jumper and sash. The following are three lesser-used textile words that were not listed, yet have established Arabic ancestry: camlet, morocco leather, and tabby.

The following are six textile fabric words whose ancestry is not established adequately in evidence, but Arabic ancestry is entertained by many reporters. Five of the six have Late Medieval start dates in Western languages and the sixth (Wadding) started in the 16th century: Buckram, Chiffon, Fustian, Gabardine, Satin, and Wadding (padding).

The fabric Taffeta has provenance in 14th-century French, Italian, Catalan, Spanish, and English, and today it is often inferred to come ultimately from a Persian word for woven (tāftah), and it might have Arabic intermediation. Fustic is a textile dye. The name is traceable to late medieval Spanish fustet dye, which is often inferred to be from an Arabic source. Carthamin is another old textile dye, its name borrowed in the late medieval West from Arabic قرطم qartam | qirtim | qurtum, meaning: "the carthamin dye plant or its seeds". The textile industry was the largest manufacturing industry in Arabic-speaking lands in the medieval and early modern eras.

=== Arabic cuisine words ===
The following words are from Arabic, although some of them have entered Western European languages through other languages. Baba ghanoush, Falafel, Fattoush, Halva, Hummus, Kibbeh, Kebab, Lahmacun, Shawarma, Tabouleh, Tahini, Za'atar.

Some cuisine words of lesser circulation are Ful medames, Kabsa, Kushari, Labneh, Mahleb, Mulukhiyah, Ma'amoul, Mansaf, Shanklish, Tepsi Baytinijan. For more, see: Arab cuisine.

Middle Eastern cuisine words were rare before 1970 in English, being mostly confined to travellers' reports. Usage increased rapidly in the 1970s for certain words.

=== Arabic music words ===
Some words that are used in English when talking about Arabic music: Ataba, Baladi, Dabke, Darbouka, Jins, Khaleeji, Maqam, Mawal, Mizmar, Oud, Qanun, Raï, Raqs sharqi, Taqsim.
