= List of English words of Arabic origin (G–J) =

Etymologic word list

The following English words have been acquired either directly from Arabic or else indirectly by passing from Arabic into other languages and then into English. Most entered one or more of the Romance languages before entering English.

To qualify for this list, a word must be reported in etymology dictionaries as having descended from Arabic. A handful of dictionaries has been used as the source for the list. Words associated with the Islamic religion are omitted; for Islamic words, see Glossary of Islam. Archaic and rare words are also omitted. A bigger listing including many words very rarely seen in English is available at Wiktionary dictionary.

== Loanwords listed in alphabetical order ==
- List of English words of Arabic origin (A-B)
- List of English words of Arabic origin (C-F)
- List of English words of Arabic origin (G-J)
- List of English words of Arabic origin (K-M)
- List of English words of Arabic origin (N-S)
- List of English words of Arabic origin (T-Z)
- List of English words of Arabic origin: Addenda for certain specialist vocabularies

=== G ===
garble
غربل gharbal [ɣarbal], to sift. Common in Arabic before year 1000. Early records in European languages are at seaports in Italy and Catalonia. They include Latin garbellare = "to sift" in year 1191 sifting drugs and resins, Latin garbellus = "a sieve for sifting spices" in 1227, Latin garbellare sifting dyestuffs in 1269, Italian gherbellare = "to sift spices and drugs" in 1321. They begot English garbele = "to sift spices" starting 1393. In later-medieval Europe, pepper and ginger and other spice trade items were always imports from the Arabic-speaking Eastern Mediterranean, and the same goes for many botanical drugs (herbal medicines) and a few expensive colorants. The spices, drugs and colorants contained variable amounts of natural chaff residuals and occasionally contained unnatural added chaff. In England among the merchants of these products in late medieval and early post-medieval centuries, garble was a frequent word. Sifting and culling was word's usual meaning in English until the 19th century and today's meaning grew out from it.

gauze
قزّ qazz[ʃaːʃ], silk of any kind – this is uncertain as the source for the Western word, but etymology dictionaries are almost unanimous the source is probably from medieval Arabic somehow. The English is from late medieval French gaze, pronounced gazz | ga:z in French, meaning "high-quality lightweight fabric having an aspect of transparency" (very often silk but not necessarily silk). Al-qazz = "silk" was frequent in medieval Arabic, and it could be relatively easily transferred into the Latin languages because much of the silk of the medieval Latins was imported from Arabic lands. Other propositions involving other Arabic source-words for the French gaze have also been aired. In the West the word has had varying sense over time, something it has in common with a number of other fabric names. A common explanation is that the word is derived from the city Gaza.

gazelle
غزال ghazāl [ɣazaːl], gazelle. Two species of gazelle are native in the Middle East. The word's earliest known record in the West is in early 12th-century Latin as gazela in a book about the First Crusade by Albert of Aix. Another early record is in late 12th-century French as gacele in a book about the Third Crusade by Ambroise of Normandy. Another is in late 13th-century French as gazel in a book about the Seventh Crusade by Jean de Joinville.
gerbil, jerboa [dʒrbwʕ], gundi, jird [dʒird]
These are four classes of rodents native to desert or semi-desert environments in North Africa and Asia, and not found natively in Europe. Jerboa is a 17th-century European borrowing of Arabic يربوع yarbūʿa = "jerboa". Early-19th-century European naturalists created "gerbil" as a Latinate diminutive of the word jerboa. قندية qundī [qndj] = gundi, 18th-century European borrowing جرد jird = jird [dʒird], 18th-century European borrowing

ghoul
غول ghūl [ɣwl], ghoul. Ghouls are a well-known part of Arabic folklore. The word's first appearance in the West was in an Arabic-to-French translation of the 1001 Arabian Nights tales in 1712. Its first appearance in English was in a popular novel, Vathek, an Arabian Tale by William Beckford, in 1786. Ghouls appear in English translations of the 1001 Arabian Nights tales in the 19th century.

giraffe
زرافة zarāfa [zaraːfa], giraffe. The giraffe and its distinctiveness was discussed by medieval Arabic writers including Al-Jahiz (died 868) and Al-Masudi (died 956). The earliest records of the transfer of the Arabic word to the West are in Italian in the second half of the 13th century, a time at which a few giraffes were brought to the Kingdom of Sicily and Naples from a zoo in Cairo, Egypt.

=== H ===
haboob (type of sandstorm)
هَبوب habūb [hbwb], gale wind. The English means a dense, short-lived, desert sandstorm created by an air downburst. Year 1897 first known use in English.

harem
حريم harīm, women's quarters in a large household. The Arabic root-word means "forbidden" and thus the word had a connotation of a place where men were forbidden. (Crossref Persian and Urdu Zenana for semantics.) 17th-century English entered English through Turkish, where the meaning was closer to what the English is. In Arabic today harīm means womenkind in general.

hashish
حشيش hashīsh, hashish. Hashīsh [ħʃjʃ]in Arabic has the literal meaning "dried herb" and "rough grass". It also means hemp grown for textile fiber. Its earliest record as a nickname for cannabis drug is in 12th- or 13th-century Arabic. In English in a traveller's report from Egypt in 1598 it is found in the form "assis". The word is rare in English until the 19th century. The wordform in English today dates from the early 19th century.

henna, alkanet, alkannin, Alkanna
حنّاء hinnā, [ħnaːʔ] henna. Henna is a reddish natural dye made from the leaves of Lawsonia inermis. The English dates from about 1600 and came directly from Arabic through English-language travellers reports from the Middle East. Alkanet dye is a reddish natural dye made from the roots of Alkanna tinctoria and this word is 14th-century English, with a Romance-language diminutive suffix '-et', from medieval Latin alcanna meaning both "henna" and "alkanet", from Arabic al-hinnā meaning henna.

hookah (water pipe for smoking)
حقّة huqqa [ħuqːa], pot or jar or round container. The word arrived in English from India in the 2nd half of the 18th century meaning hookah. The Indian word was from Persian, and the Persian was from Arabic, but the Arabic source-word did not mean hookah, although the word re-entered Arabic later on meaning hookah.

hummus (food recipe)
حمّص himmas, [ħumːmsˤ] chickpea(s). Chickpeas in medieval Arabic were called himmas and were a frequently eaten food item. In the 19th century in Syria and Lebanon the word was commonly pronounced hommos. This was borrowed into Turkish as humus, and entered English from Turkish in the mid-20th century. The Turkish and English hummus means mashed chickpeas mixed with tahini and certain flavourings. In Arabic that is called himmas bil tahina. See also the list's Addendum for Middle Eastern cuisine words.

=== I ===
Inshallah
إن شاء الله /ɪn ʃæʔ ɑːˈlɑː/, "God willing" Though the Arabic word has Islamic connotations, the phrase became widespread in everyday speech even among non-Muslim, non-Arabic-speaking communities, many of whom might be unaware of its religious significance. Often employed to convey sarcasm or disbelief, it gained particular attention when Joe Biden used it during his political debates.

=== J ===
jar (food or drink container)
جرّة jarra[dʒrː], an earthenware jar, an upright container made of pottery. First records in English are in 1418 and 1421 as a container for olive oil. Documents for Catalan jarra start in 1233, Spanish jarra in 1251, Italian iarra in 1280s. Arabic jarra is commonplace centuries earlier. For the medieval Arabic and Spanish word, and also for the word's early centuries of use in English, the typical jar was considerably bigger than the typical jar in English today.

jasmine, jessamine, jasmone
ياسمين yās(a)mīn, jasmine[jaːsmjn]. In medieval Arabic jasmine was well known. The word has an early record in the West in southern Italy in an Arabic-to-Latin book translation about year 1240 that mentions flower-oil extracted from jasmine flowers. In the West, the word was uncommon until the 16th century and the same goes for the plant itself (Jasminum officinale and its relatives).

jerboa, jird
see gerbil

jinn (mythology)
الجنّ al-jinn [dʒinː], the jinn. The roles of jinns and ghouls in Arabic folklore are discussed by e.g. Al-Masudi (died 956). (The semantically related English genie is not derived from jinn, though it has been influenced by it through the 1001 Nights tales).

julep (type of drink)
جلاب julāb [dʒulːaːb], rose water and a syrupy drink. Arabic was from Persian gulab = "rose water". In its early use in English it was a syrupy drink. Like the words candy, sugar, and syrup, "julep" arrived in English in late medieval times in association with imports of cane sugar from Arabic-speaking lands. Like syrup, julep's early records in English are mostly in medicine writers.

jumper (dress or pullover sweater)
جُبَّة jubba [dʒubːa], an outer garment. In Western languages the word is first seen in southern Italy in Latin in 1053 and 1101 as iuppa, meaning an expensive garment and made of silk, not otherwise described. Mid-12th-century Latin juppum and late-12th-century French jupe meant some kind of luxury jacket garment. In English, the 14th-century ioupe, joupe, 15th-century iowpe | jowpe, 17th-century jup, juppe, and jump, 18th jupo and jump, 19th jump and jumper, all meant jacket.

=== Addendum for words that may or may not be of Arabic ancestry ===
garbage
This English word is not found in bygone centuries in French or other languages. The early meaning in English was poultry entrails and its earliest known record in English is 1422. Its parentage is not clear. Some nouns formed by suffixing -age to verbs in late medieval English and not found in French: cartage (1305), leakage (1444 lecage), steerage (1399 sterage), stoppage (1465), towage (1327). Garbage is arguably from English garble = "to sift" (first known record 1393), which clearly came to English through the Romance languages from Arabic gharbal = "to sift". The forms "garbellage" and "garblage" meaning the garbage or inferior material removed by sifting, are recorded spottily in English from the 14th through 18th centuries and those are clearly from garble.

genet/genetta (nocturnal mammal)
Seen in 13th-century English, 13th-century French and Catalan, and 12th-century Portuguese. It is absent from medieval Arabic writings. Nevertheless, an oral dialectical Maghrebi Arabic source for the European word has been suggested. جرنيط jarnait = "genet" is attested in the 19th century in Maghrebi dialect. But the absence of attestation in Arabic in any earlier century must make Arabic origin questionable.

guitar
The name is ultimately descended from ancient Greek kithara, which was a plucked string musical instrument of the lyre type. Classical and medieval Latin had cithara as a lyre and more loosely a plucked string instrument. So did the medieval Romance languages. Cithara was pronounced "sitara". Cithara is unlikely to be the parent of the French quitarre (c. 1275), French guiterne (c. 1280), French kitaire (c. 1285), Italian chitarra (c. 1305; pronounced "kitarra"), and Spanish guitarra (1330–1343), each meaning a gittern type guitar. The reason it is unlikely: A change from ci- to any of qui- | gui- | ki- | chi- has almost no parallel change in form in other words within the Romance languages around that time; i.e., change from sound /s/ to sound /k/ or /g/ is a rarity. Hence the qui- | gui- | ki- | chi- form (which is essentially all one form) is believed to have been introduced from an external source. A minority of dictionaries report the external source was medieval Greek kithára = "lyre, and more loosely a plucked string instrument", a common word in medieval Greek records. A majority of dictionaries report the external source was Arabic قيتارة qītāra | كيثرة kaīthara, with the same meaning as the Greek. An Arabic name of roughly the form qītāra | kaīthār is extremely rare in medieval Arabic records, which undermines the idea that Arabic was the source. Lute and tanbur on this list are descended from names that are common in medieval Arabic records for guitar-type musical instruments.

hazard
Medieval French hasart | hasard | azard had the primary meaning of a game of dice and especially a game of dice where money was gambled. The early records are in northern French and the first is about year 1150 as hasart, with multiple records of hasart in northern France about year 1200, and Anglo-Norman hasart is in England before 1216, and Anglo-Norman has hasardur and hasardrie at and before 1240, which is followed by Italian açar about 1250 with the same meaning as hasart | hasard, and Italian-Latin azar(r)um and azardum later in the 13th century, and Spanish azar starting around 1250, and English hasard about 1300. According to its etymology summary in a number of today's dictionaries, the French word was descended through Spanish from an unattested Arabic oral dialectical az-zār | az-zahr = "the dice" – but that is an extremely improbable proposition because that word has no record in Arabic with that meaning until the early 19th century. An alternative proposition, having the advantage of attestation in medieval Arabic, derives it from medieval Arabic يسر yasar = "playing at dice". Conceivably this might have entered French through the Crusader States of the Levant. The French word is of obscure origin.
