= Arabic English =

Arabic English may refer to:

- Arabic-English Lexicon
- List of Arabic loanwords in English

== See also ==
- British Arabs
- Arab American
- Arab Australian
- Arab Canadians
