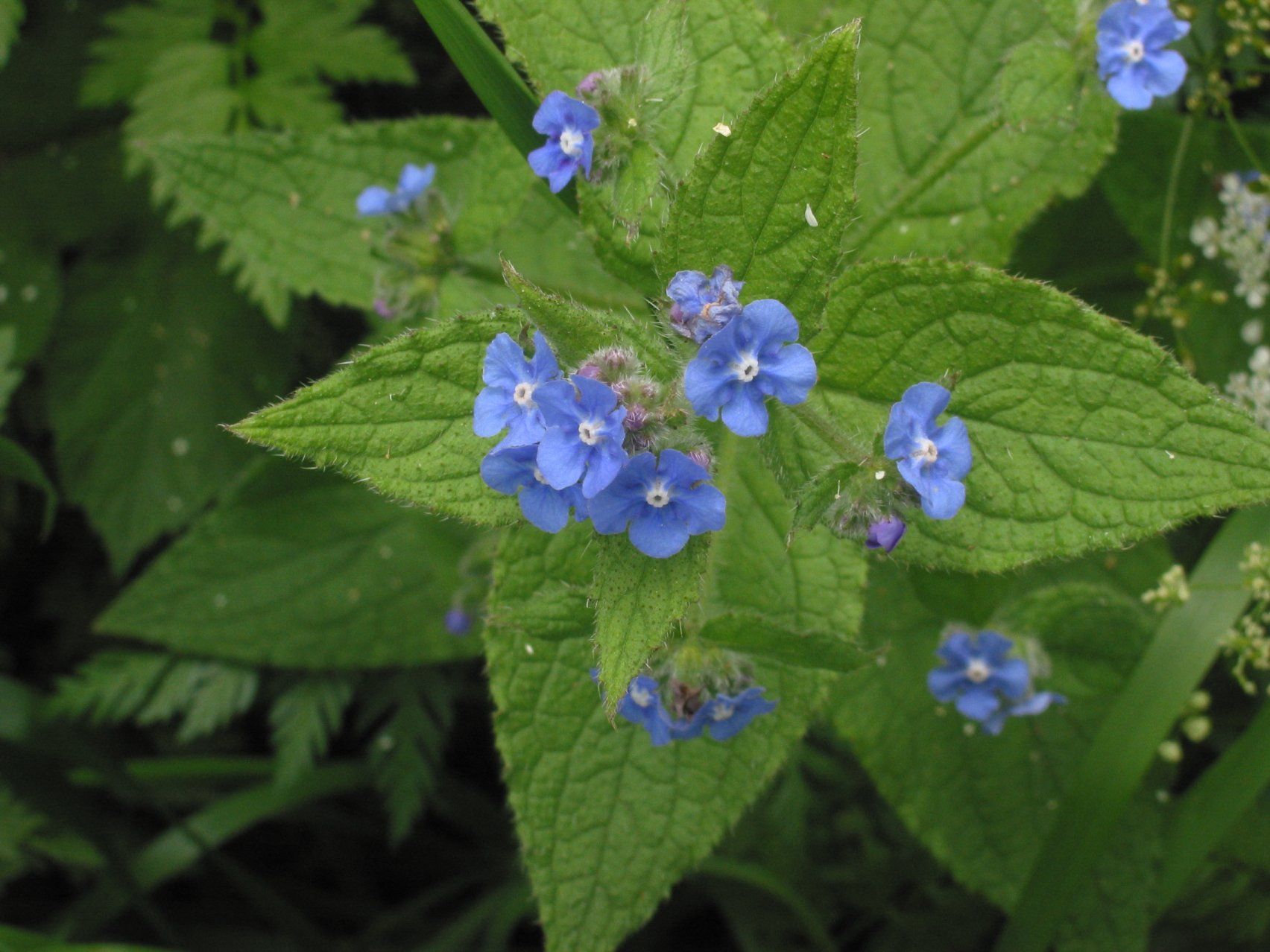

Scientific classification
- Kingdom: Plantae
- Clade: Embryophytes
- Clade: Tracheophytes
- Clade: Spermatophytes
- Clade: Angiosperms
- Clade: Eudicots
- Clade: Asterids
- Order: Boraginales
- Family: Boraginaceae
- Genus: Pentaglottis; Tausch
- Species: P. sempervirens

Binomial name
- Pentaglottis sempervirens (L.) Tausch ex L.H.Bailey

Synonyms
- List: Anchusa adami Mazziari in Ionios Antologia 5: 182 (1835); Anchusa sempervirens L. in Sp. Pl.: 134 (1753); Buglossa sempervirens (L.) Gray in Nat. Arr. Brit. Pl. 2: 352 (1821 publ. 1822); Buglossum sempervirens (L.) All. in Fl. Pedem. 1: 48 (1785); Caryolopha sempervirens (L.) Fisch. & Trautv. in Index Seminum (LE, Petropolitanus) 3: 31 (1837); Omphalodes sempervirens (L.) D.Don in Prodr. Fl. Nepal.: 101 (1825)

= Pentaglottis =

Green alkanet

Genus of flowering plants

Pentaglottis is a monotypic genus of flowering plants in the family Boraginaceae. It is represented by a single species, Pentaglottis sempervirens, commonly known as green alkanet or evergreen bugloss, and it is one of several related plants known as alkanet. It is a bristly, perennial plant native to southwestern Europe, in northwest Iberia and France.

== Description ==
Pentaglottis sempervirens is a perennial, that has a deep tap root. It grows up to approximately 60–90 cm (23.6–35.4 in) tall with a roughly hairy stem. It has broadly ovate, or pointed oval leaves and the lower leaves have leaf stalks. Both the leaves and stem can cause skin irritation. It can retain its green leaves through the winter.

Green alkanet blooms in spring and summer, while the ground is moist. It has pink flower buds, that open up to brilliant blue or bright blue flowers with a white centre, approximately 10 mm (0.4 in) wide. There are 5 sepals. It has clusters of flowers, but only one flowering at a time. Its stamens are hidden inside narrow flower-tubes which end in a white eye in the centre of a blue flower.

The flowers are pollinated by bees and bumblebees, and the seed capsules can also be transported over some distances on passing animal fur or attached to clothing.

== Taxonomy ==
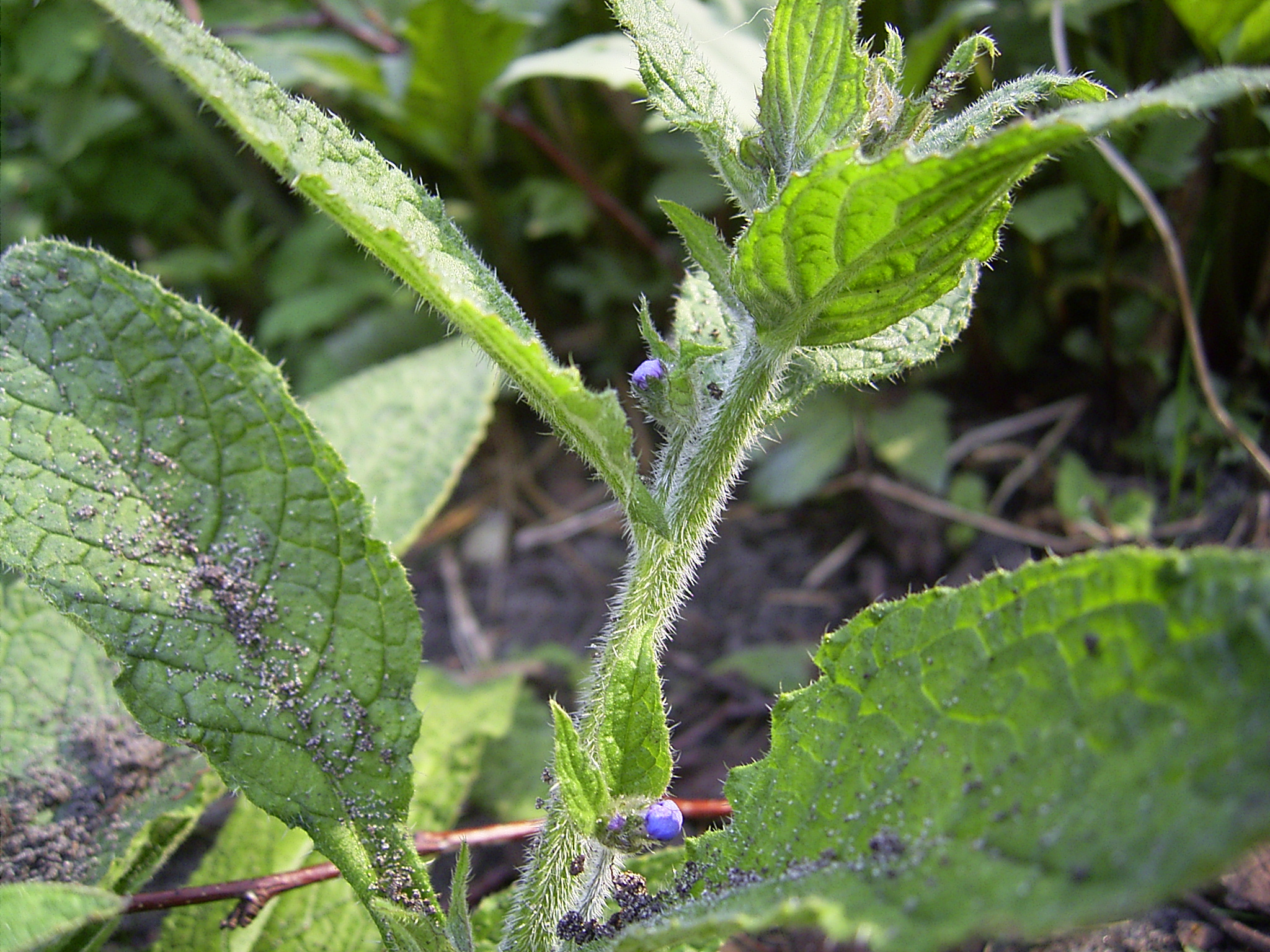
Stem and leaves of Pentaglottis sempervirens

It is commonly known as evergreen-bugloss and green alkanet.

The genus Pentaglottis was first published by Bohemian botanist Ignaz Friedrich Tausch (1793–1848), in Flora 12: 643 in 1829, then the species Pentaglottis sempervirens was first published by American botanist Liberty Hyde Bailey (1858–1954) in Man. Cult. Pl., ed. 2: 837 in 1949.

The genus name Pentaglottis is Greek, meaning "five tongues", and the species specific epithet of sempervirens is Latin, and means "always alive", or "evergreen".

The word "alkanet" derives from Middle English, from Old Spanish alcaneta, diminutive of alcana, "henna", from Medieval Latin alchanna, from Arabic al-ḥinnā’, "henna" : al-: "the" + ḥinnā’, "henna". The common name of "alkanet" is also used for dyer's bugloss (Alkanna tinctoria) and common bugloss (Anchusa officinalis).

The genus Pentaglottis has two known synonyms, Carylopha Fisch. & Trautv. and Caryolopha Fisch. & Trautv.

The genus and species are accepted by GRIN (United States Department of Agriculture and the Agricultural Research Service).

== Distribution ==
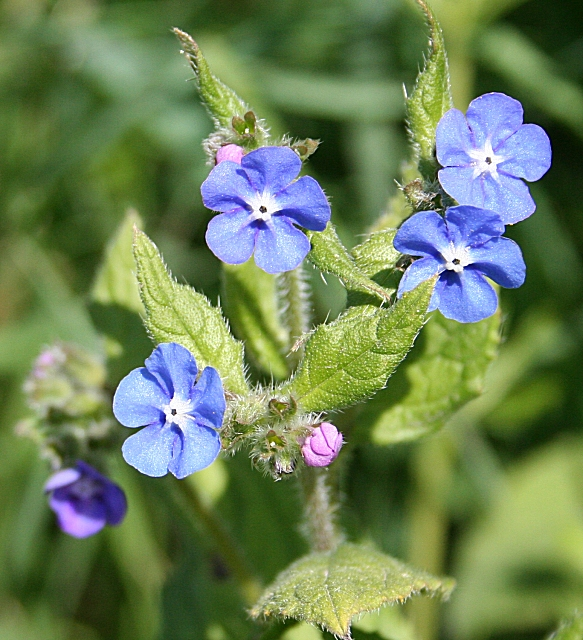
Flowers and pink flowerbud of Pentaglottis sempervirens

The native range of this genus is south western Europe. It is endemic to France, Portugal and Spain. It was introduced into the countries (and regions) of Australia (with the state of Tasmania) Belgium, Canada (within the province of British Columbia), Czechoslovakia, Great Britain, Ireland, Italy and the United States (within the states of California, Maine, Oregon and Washington).

Green alkanet is an introduced species in the British Isles.

== Habitat ==
It is found in woods and in hedge-banks, or in damp or shaded places and often close to some buildings. It likes alkaline soils and is considered a weed in some parts of the UK.

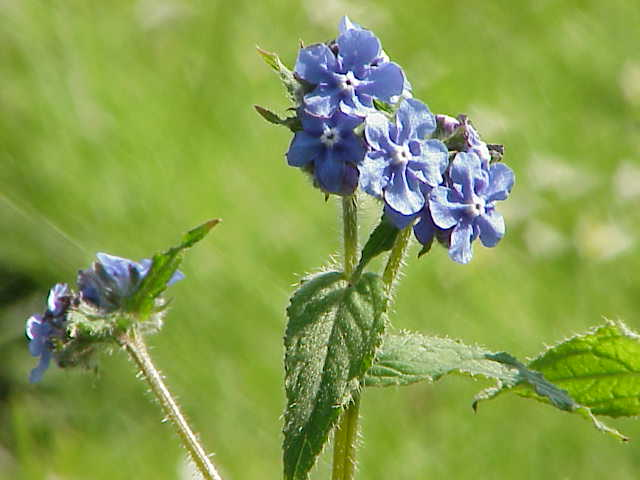
Flower close-up

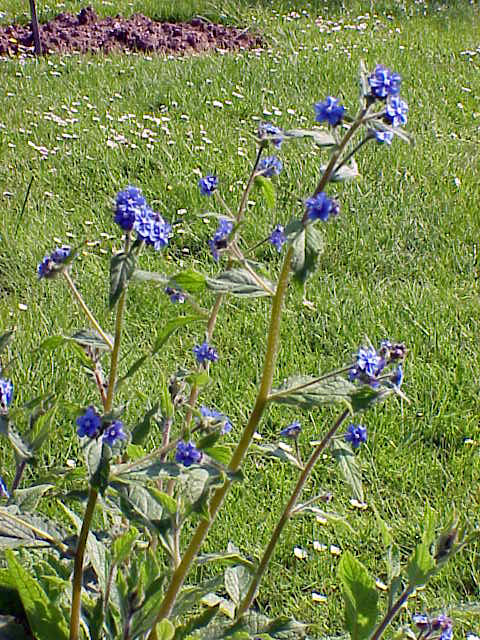
Stalk and flowers

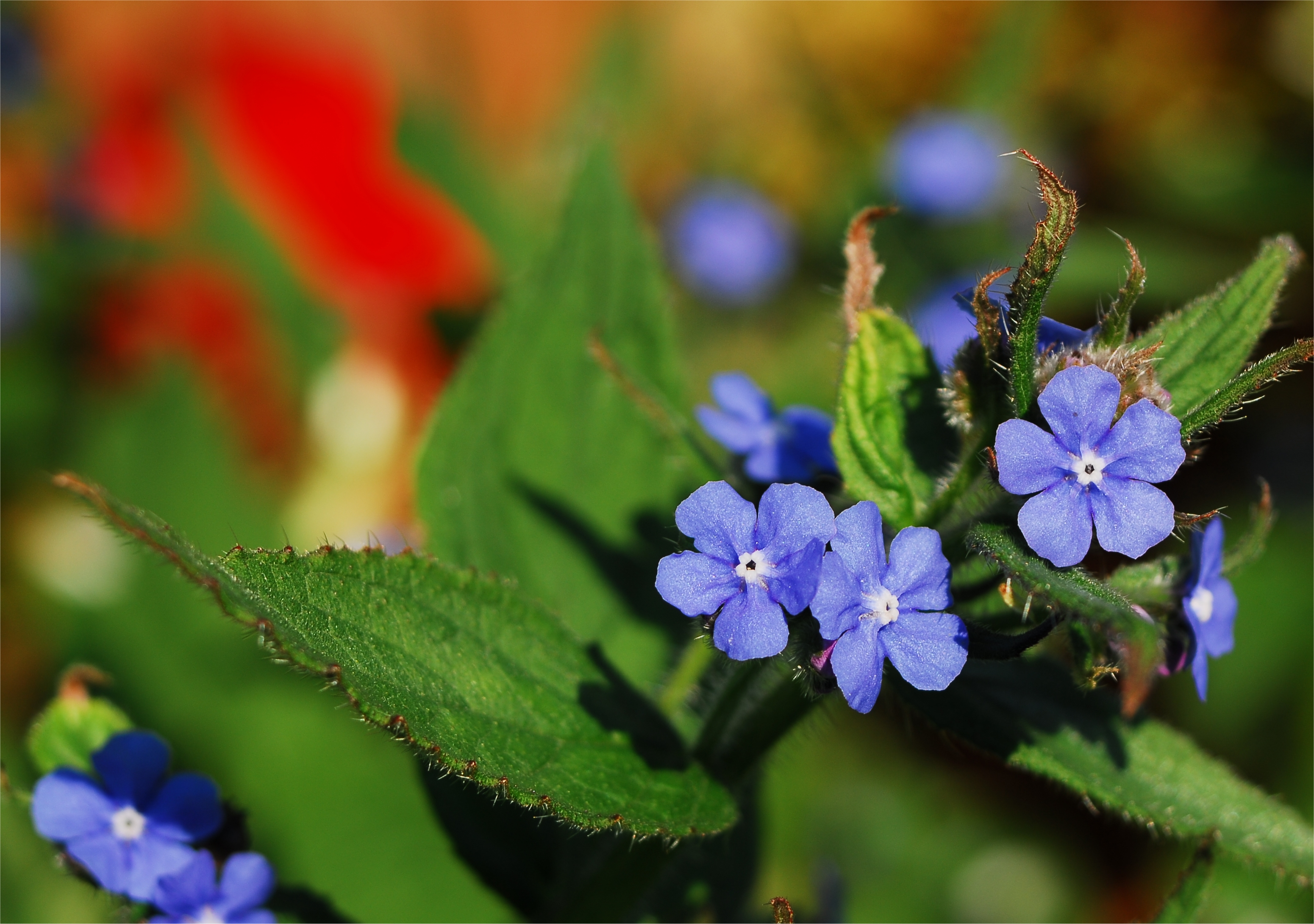
Flower close-up

== Uses ==
The blue flowers of the green alkanet are edible, and are often used as a garnish for salads or drinks.

Green alkanet roots are not edible. They contain pyrrolizidine alkaloids, which are toxic to the liver, even when cooked.

Although toxic if consumed in large quantities, the leaves have medicinal properties and were recommended for the treatment of coughs, digestive problems and fevers by Nicholas Culpeper. The leaves were also considered an effective remedy for burns and ulcers when crushed and combined with vinegar. In modern times the leaves and stems have been used by doctors to treat staphylococcus.
