= Alkana =

Alkana may be:

- the surname of:
  - Antonio Alkana, South African athlete
- a misspelling for:
  - Alkanna, a genus of plants
  - Alkane, a class of chemical compounds
  - Alcanar, a city in Spain
