= Magasin =

Magasin may refer to:

- Magasin du Nord, today branded as Magasin, a Danish department store brand
- Le Magasin, Centre National d'Art Contemporain, an art exhibit founded in 1986
- "Magasin" (song), a 1994 song by Eraserheads

== See also ==
- Magazine (disambiguation)
