= List of English words of Arabic origin (K–M) =

The following English words have been required either way directly from Arabic or else indirectly by passing from Arabic into other languages and then into English. Most entered one or more of the Romance languages before entering English.

To qualify for this list, a word must be reported in etymology dictionaries as having descended from Arabic. A handful of dictionaries has been used as the source for the list. Words associated with the Islamic religion are omitted; for Islamic words, see Glossary of Islam. Rare and archaic words are also omitted. A bigger listing including many words very rarely seen in English is available at Wiktionary dictionary.

== Loanwords listed in alphabetical order ==
- List of English words of Arabic origin (A-B)
- List of English words of Arabic origin (C-F)
- List of English words of Arabic origin (G-J)
- List of English words of Arabic origin (K–M)
- List of English words of Arabic origin (N-S)
- List of English words of Arabic origin (T-Z)
- List of English words of Arabic origin: Addenda for certain specialist vocabularies

=== K ===
Khalsa, Khalistan
خالصة khalsa [xaːlsˤa] 'pure, real, proper.'

Kermes (insect genus), kermes (dye), kermes oak (tree), kermesite (mineral)
قِرمِز qirmiz [qirmiz], dye from kermes-type scale insects including (but not limited to) today's Kermes insects. The bodies of several scale insect species produce a crimson dye that in medieval times was commercially valuable for dyeing textiles. Medieval Arabic dictionaries say al-qirmiz is an "Armenian red dye", which means dye from the Armenian cochineal insects of today's English, which are distinct from the Kermes insects. The word was in use in Arabic for centuries before it started to be used in European languages, and was adopted in Europe beginning in the late 13th century, in Italy, with the same meaning as the Arabic. In Europe the meaning began to be narrowed to today's Kermes species in scientific botany and taxonomy works of the mid 16th century.

khat, cathinone
قات qāt[qaːt], the plant Catha edulis and the stimulant obtained from it. Khat was borrowed directly from Arabic qāt in the mid 19th century. The technical botany name Catha was borrowed from the same Arabic in the mid-18th century (botanist was Peter Forskal).

kismet
قسمة qisma [qisma], destinity, fate. Kismet was borrowed into English via Turkish from the original Arabic word qisma which means portion or lot.

kohl (cosmetics)
كحل kohl [kuħl], finely powdered galena, stibnite, and similar sooty-colored powder used for eye-shadow, eye-liner, and mascara. The word with that meaning was in many travellers' reports in English, from travellers in Arabic lands, for centuries before it was adopted natively in English. Crossref alcohol which was transferred from the same Arabic word at an earlier time by a different pathway.

=== L ===
lacquer, lac
لكّ lakk, [lk] lac. The Arabic came from the Sanskrit lākh = "lac", a particular kind of resin, native in India, used to make a varnish and also used as a red colorant. Lac was valued foremostly as a red colorant in the medieval era. The medieval Arabs imported lac from India. The word entered medieval Latin as lacca | laca in the early 9th century, although instances are scarce in Latin before the 12th century. It is found late medievally in all of the Western Latinate languages. Two lesser-seen varnishing resins with Arabic word-descent are sandarac and elemi.

lambic
الإنبيق al-anbīq [ʔlʔinbjq], "the still" (for distilling). The Arabic root is traceable to Greek ambix = "cup". The earliest chemical distillations were by Greeks in Alexandria in Egypt in about the 3rd century AD. Their ambix became the 9th-century Arabic al-anbīq, which became the 12th-century Latin alembicus, and subsequently French as alambic. In French, the word was shortened to lambic, and the shortened form was subsequently borrowed into English in the 19th century.

lazurite (mineral)
See azure.

lemon, limonene
ليمون līmūn[lajmuːn], lemon. The cultivation of lemons, limes, and bitter oranges was introduced to the Mediterranean region by the Arabs in the mid-medieval era. The ancient Greeks & Romans knew the citron, but not the lemon, lime, or orange. Ibn al-'Awwam in the late 12th century distinguished ten kinds of citrus fruits grown in Andalusia and spelled the lemon as اللامون al-lāmūn. Abdallatif al-Baghdadi (died 1231) distinguished almost as many different citrus fruits in Egypt and spelled the lemon as الليمون al-līmūn. The Arabic word came from Persian. The lemon tree's native origin appears to be in India.

lime (fruit)
ليم līm [liːm], meaning sometimes any citrus fruit, sometimes lemon and lime fruit, and sometimes a lime fruit. In Arabic līm was a back-formation from līmūn; see lemon. Medieval writers who used līm with the meaning of a lime fruit include Al-Qalqashandi (died 1414), Ibn Batuta (died 1369), and Ibn Khaldoun (died 1406). In Spanish and Italian today lima means lime fruit. In bygone centuries in Spanish and Italian lima meant also lime-lemon varieties distinct from today's lime. Pedro de Alcalá's Spanish-Arabic dictionary year 1505 translated the Spanish lima as Arabic lim. Today in English "lime" has become a color-name as well as a fruit. The color-name originated by reference to the fruit. It can be noted in passing that all the following English color-names are descended from Arabic words (not necessarily Arabic color-words): apricot (color), aubergine (color), azure (color), coffee (color), crimson (color), henna (color), lemon (color), lime (color), orange (color), saffron (color), tangerine (color).

luffa
ليف Līf [ljf], luffa. Entered European botany nomenclature from Egypt in 1638. The luffa is a tropical plant, native in Indochina, which was under cultivation with irrigation in Egypt at the time. The name has been in English botany books since the mid 18th century as Luffa. In the later 19th century it re-entered English in non-botanical discourse as "Loofah" referring to the luffa scrubbing sponge.

lute
العود al-ʿaūd|عُود [ʕuːd] (the oud. Al-ʿaūd was one of the chief musical instruments of the Arabs throughout the medieval era. The European lute word, a word now in all European languages, has its earliest records in the mid 13th century in Catalan and Spanish. The early Catalan form was laut. Spanish has alod in 1254, alaut in about 1330, laud in 1343. "The Portuguese form pt:Alaúde clearly shows the Arabic origin." Medievally the ʿaūd of the Arabs and the lute of the Latins were very nearly the same instrument and differed mainly in the musicians' playing style. The medieval Latins borrowed the instrument from the Arabs, as well as the name. The earliest unambiguous record in English is in the 2nd half of the 14th century (Middle English Dictionary).

=== M ===
macramé
مِقرَمة miqrama [miqrama], an embroidered cloth covering. Closely related is Arabic miqram = "decorated bedspread or tapestry". The path to English is said to be: Arabic -> Turkish -> Italian -> French -> English. 19th-century English.

magazine
مخازن makhāzin [maxaːzin], storehouses, storerooms. Contains the Arabic root khazan = "to store" and the Arabic noun prefix m-. The word khazaanah is also used in Persian (spoken in Iran) and Dari (spoken in Afghanistan) to refer to a place of storage. The earliest known record in a European language is Latin magazenum meaning "storeroom" in 1228 at the seaport of Marseille. The other early records in European languages are in Italian and Catalan coastal cities in the 13th century, with the same meaning. The word still has that meaning today in Arabic, French, Italian, Catalan, and Russian. It was sometimes used that way in English in the 16th to 18th centuries, but more commonly in English a magazine was a storage place for ammunitions or gunpowder, and later a receptacle for storing bullets. A magazine in the publishing sense of the word started in the English language, and its start was in the 17th century meaning a store of information about military or navigation subjects.

marcasite
مرقشيثا marqashīthā, iron sulfide, from Arabic مَرَقشِيت [maraqʃiːt]. Occurs in Arabic in a 9th-century minerals book, and was used by Al-Razi (died c. 930) and Ibn Sina (died 1037) and Al-Biruni (died 1048), among others. The word's earliest known records in the European languages are in Arabic-to-Latin translations dated late 12th century. In modern English, marcasite is defined scientifically as orthorhombic iron sulfide, but marcasite jewelry is jewelry made from isometric iron sulfide.

massicot
مسحقونيا masḥaqūniyā | مسحوقونيا masḥūqūniyā, a glazing material applied in the manufacture of pottery. In today's English massicot is defined as orthorhombic lead monoxide (PbO). Historically, in the late medieval and early modern West, the most common context of use of lead monoxide (including massicot) was in the manufacture of lead-based pottery glazes, and, later, lead glass. The Western word's history starts with late medieval Latin massacumia, which was a pottery glazing material in Italy in the late 13th century (sometimes lead-based and sometimes not), and came from Arabic masḥaqūniyā (mas-ha-qun-iya) meaning approximately the same.

mattress, matelasse
مطرح matrah[matˤraħ], a large cushion or rug for lying on. In Arabic the sense evolved out of the sense "something thrown down" from Arabic root tarah = "to throw". Classical Latin matta = "mat" is no relation. The word is in Catalan-Latin in the 12th century as almatrac. It is in Italian-Latin in the 13th century as matratium, almatracium, and similar. It spread into French and English in the 14th century. The mattress word at that time in Europe usually meant a padded under-blanket, "a quilt to lie upon".

mecca
مكة makkah [makːa]Makkah is the central-most city of the Islamic world wherein people from all around the world congregate as pilgrims to perform the “Hajj”. In English, however, “Mecca” refers to an epicentre of a subculture, ethnicity, common interests/demographic or certain requirement group to gather at, that is established either formally or informally. For example, “New York City is the 'mecca' of the economic world”.

mohair, moiré
المُخيَّر al-mokhayyar, from Arabic مُخيَّر [muxjːar], high-quality cloth made from fine goat hair (from Arabic root khayar = "choosing, preferring"). Mohair from the hair of Angora goats in Ankara province in Turkey in the early 16th century was the original cloth named mohair in the West, although earlier mohair-type cloth had been imported from the Middle East under the name camlet. Earliest record in the West is 1542 Italian. Early English was spelled "mocayare", starting 1570. The mutation in English to "mohaire" is first seen in 1619. Moiré means a shimmering visual effect from an interweaved or grating structure. It started out in French as a mutation of mohair.

monsoon, typhoon
These words referred to wind and rain events off the coasts of India and China in their earliest use in Western languages and are seen first in Portuguese in the early 16th century. Arabic sea-merchants were active in the East Indies long before the Portuguese arrived – see e.g. Islam in the Philippines and camphor and benzoin in this list. موسم mawsim[mawsim] (season, used in Arabic for anything that comes round once a year (such as festive season) and used by Arab sailors in the East Indies for the seasonal sailing winds. طوفان tūfān, a big rainstorm, a deluge, and used in the Koran for Noah's Flood. More about the early history of the two words among European sailors in the East Indies is in A Glossary of Colloquial Anglo-Indian Words and Phrases, and of Kindred Terms, Etymological, Historical, Geographical and Discursive, by Yule and Burnell (year 1903).

mufti (clothing style)
مَفتِي muftī[muftj], mufti (an expert in Islamic law). The phrase 'mufti day' is sometimes used instead of 'own clothes day' in some English speaking schools to mean a day when students and teachers can wear casual clothes or clothes in their own style rather than the institution's uniform or semi-uniform clothes. The term originated in the British Army in the early 19th century. It seems the term originated just because the clothing style of a mufti was much different from the style of the army's uniform clothing at the time.http://dictionary.com/browse/mufti

mummy
مومياء mūmiyā' [mwmjaːʔ], a bituminous substance used in medicine and in embalming, and secondarily sometimes it meant a corpse embalmed with the substance. The later-medieval Western languages borrowed the Arabic word in those senses. Post-medievally in the West the sense was extended to a corpse preserved by desiccation (drying out).

muslin
مُوصِلي mūsilī [muːsˤilj], fine lightweight fabric made in Mosul in Mesopotamia, usually cotton, sometimes linen. The word entered Western Europe with the same meaning in the 16th and early 17th century. The fabric was imported from Aleppo by Italians at the time. The earliest record in English is muslina in a traveller's report from Aleppo in 1609. The ending -ina was an Italian addition. In Italian, a suffix -ina acts as a diminutive (communicates lightweight).

=== Addendum for words that may or may not be of Arabic ancestry ===
lilac
It is well documented that the common lilac tree was originally brought to Western Europe directly from Istanbul in the early 1560s. Among the earliest records of the tree and of the word in the Western European languages are in botany books in Latin by P.A. Matthiolus in 1565 and Carolus Clusius in 1576 stating that the "Lilac" tree was recently brought to Western Europe from the Turks and from Istanbul. "Lilac" is in English in the botanist John Gerarde in 1596 and 1597, a date which ranks among the word's earliest in any vernacular Western European language. The early word in Western Europe had the exclusive meaning of the common lilac tree (aka Syringa vulgaris). The tree's native place of origin was the Balkans, where it blooms in the wild with light-purple blue-ish flowers. There is reason to think the name may be descended from a Persian word for blue-ish color. The Persian is not attested as a tree or a flower; it is attested as a color. A route of intermediation involving Arabic is a slim possibility.

macabre
Records begin in late medieval French (1376). All the early records involve "the very specific phrase danse macabre, which denoted a dance in which a figure representing death enticed people to dance with him until they dropped down dead." A non-Arabic candidate for the origin of the French exists but has semantic and phonetic weaknesses. The meaning can be fitted to the Arabic مقابر maqābir = "graves". Maqābir is frequent in medieval Arabic meaning a cemetery. Medieval Portuguese almocavar = "cemetery for Muslims or Jews" is certainly from the Arabic al-maqābir. But there is no known historical context for a transfer of the Arabic (via any pathway) into the French danse macabre. That is a major weakness.

mafia
Mafia comes from Sicilian mafiusu. Further etymology uncertain and disputed. Some propose an Arabic root for mafiusu; others say the word history prior to 19th century is unknown.

mask, masquerade, mascara, masque
Late medieval Italian maschera = "mask put upon a person's face" is the source for the French, English and Spanish set of words. The first known record in Italian is dated 1351 (occurring in Boccaccio's Decameron). The source for the Italian word is highly uncertain. One possibility is the Latin precedent masca = "witch". One other possibility is the Arabic precedent مسخرة maskhara = "buffoon, jester". In the context where mask was used, "the sense of entertainment is the usual one in old authors"; see Carnival of Venice, Masquerade Ball, Mascherata.

massage
The English comes from French. The French is first recorded in 1779 as a verb masser = "to massage" which then produced the noun massage starting in 1808. The origin of the French has not been explained. Most of the early records in French are found in accounts of travels in the Middle East. The practice of massage was common in the Middle East for centuries before it became common in the West in the mid-to-late 19th century; see Victorian Turkish baths. Consequently, there has been a proposal that the French word be from Arabic مسّ mass = "to touch". But the Arabic word for massage was a different word, namely tamsīd | dallak | tadlīk. The fact that the early records in French did not use an Arabic word for massage seems to preclude the hypothesis that the word they did use was borrowed from Arabic. A different hypothesis is the Portuguese amassar = "to knead" and/or Spanish amasar | masar = "to knead", which are descended from classical Latin massa meaning "mass", "lump of material" and "kneaded dough", and are longstanding commonplace words in Spanish and Portuguese for kneading of bread dough.

mizzen-mast
Mizzen (or mizen) is a type of sail or position of a sail-mast on a ship. English is traceable to 14th-century Italian mez(z)ana = "mizzen". The medieval mizzen was a smaller sail situated near the rear of the ship and its primary purpose was to improve steerage (it was not really for propulsion). Most dictionaries say the Italian word came from medieval native Italian mezzo meaning "middle", from a classical Latin word meaning "middle". But the mizzen sail does not have semantic concordance with "middle". The alternative is: "It is possible that the Italian word... is really adopted from Arabic ميزان mīzān = "balance". The mizen is, even now, a sail that 'balances,' and the reef in a mizen is still called the 'balance'-reef."

mortise
The word's origin in 13th-century France is without an explanation in terms of French or Latin. Some dictionaries mention an Arabic hypothesis.
