= List of English words of Arabic origin (T–Z) =

The following English words have been acquired either directly from Arabic or else indirectly by passing from Arabic into other languages and then into English. Most entered one or more of the Romance languages before entering English.

To qualify for this list, a word must be reported in etymology dictionaries as having descended from Arabic. A handful of dictionaries has been used as the source for the list. Words associated with the Islamic religion are omitted; for Islamic words, see Glossary of Islam. Archaic and rare words are also omitted. A bigger listing including many words very rarely seen in English is available at Wiktionary dictionary.

== Loanwords listed in alphabetical order ==
- List of English words of Arabic origin (A-B)
- List of English words of Arabic origin (C-F)
- List of English words of Arabic origin (G-J)
- List of English words of Arabic origin (K-M)
- List of English words of Arabic origin (N-S)
- List of English words of Arabic origin (T-Z)
- List of English words of Arabic origin: Addenda for certain specialist vocabularies

=== T ===
tabla (percussion instrument in music of India)
طبلة tabla [tˤabla], drum. English tabla is from Hindi/Urdu tabla, which is from Persian tabla = "small drum", Persian tabl = "drum", and Arabic tabl. The Persian is from the Arabic. Tabl in Arabic has been the usual word for drum (noun and verb) since the beginning of written records.

tabby
عتابية / ʿattābiyya The English term tabby originally referred to "striped silk taffeta", from the French word tabis, meaning "a rich watered silk". This can be further traced to the Middle French atabis (14th century), which stemmed from the Arabic term عتابية / ʿattābiyya. This word is a reference to the Attabiya district of Baghdad, noted for its striped cloth and silk; itself named after the Umayyad governor of Mecca Attab ibn Asid. Such silk cloth became popular in the Muslim world and spread to England, where the word "tabby" became commonly used in the 17th and 18th centuries. Use of the term tabby cat for a cat with a striped coat began in the 1690s, and was shortened to tabby in 1774. The notion that tabby indicates a female cat may be due to the feminine proper name Tabby as a nickname of "Tabitha".

tahini
طحينة tahīna [tˤaħiːna], tahini. Derives from the Arabic verb for "grind" and is related to tahīn = "flour". The written Arabic tahīna is pronounced "taheeny" in Levantine Arabic. The word entered English directly from Levantine Arabic around year 1900, although tahini was rarely eaten in English-speaking countries until around 1970.

talc
طلق talq [tˤalq], mica and talc. Common in medieval Arabic. Documented in Latin alchemy from around 1200 onward, meaning mica and talc. Uncommon in the Latinate languages until the later 16th century. In all European languages today.

talisman
طلسم tilsam | tilasm[tˤalsm], talisman. The Arabic came from Late Greek telesma = "consecration rite". Medievally in Arabic and Syriac it was used in the sense of "incantation" sometimes. Al-Masudi (died 956) and Ibn al-Awwam (died c. 1200) are examples of Arabic writers who used the word in the sense of an astrology-based talisman. An 11th-century, 400-page Arabic book about occult magic, astrology and talismans, the book entitled the Ghāyat al-Hakīm, uses the word about 200 times in the sense of a talisman, meaning an image with talismanic powers created through the guidance of astrology. The word entered astrology in the West with this meaning in the early 17th century, beginning in French. Early users in French said the word came from Arabic.

tamarind
تمر هندي tamr hindī (literally: "Indian date")[tamr hndj], tamarind. Tamarinds were in use in ancient India. They were not known to the ancient Greeks and Romans. They entered medieval Latin medical practice from Arabic. In English the early records are in translations of Latin medical texts. Tamarind's medieval medical uses were various.

tanbur, tanbura, tambur, tambura, tambouras, tamburica, tembûr
These are all long-necked plucked string musical instruments. From Arabic طنبور ṭunbūr(also ṭanbūr) [tˤanbuːr], long-necked plucked string instrument. The word occurs early and often in medieval Arabic. It was also in use in Early Medieval Aramaic. The English tambourine, a percussive instrument, is without any documentary evidence that would etymologically relate it. Likewise tambour = "drum" is either unrelated to tambur = "string instrument" or else the relation is poorly understood.

tangerine
طنجة Tanja [tˤandʒa], city and port of Tangier in Morocco. Tangerine oranges or mandarin oranges were not introduced to the Mediterranean region until the early 19th century. The English word "tangerine" arose in the UK in the early 1840s from shipments of tangerine oranges from Tangier. The word origin was in the UK. The Arabic name for a tangerine is unrelated. The city existed in pre-Arabic times named "Tingi".

tare (weight)
طرح tarh [tˤarħ]| طرحة tarha, a discard (something discarded; from root tarah, to throw). Medieval Arabic tarh | tarha was also used meaning "a deduction, a subtraction". The tare weight is defined in English as the weight of a package that's empty. To get the net weight of goods in a package, you weigh the goods in their package, which is the gross weight, and then discard the tare weight. Catalan tara dates from 1271, French tare 1311, Italian tara 1332, England tare 1380. The word has a record in Spanish around 1400 in the form atara, which helps affirm Arabic ancestry because the leading 'a' in atara represents the Arabic definite article. It is spelled tara in today's Spanish, Italian, German, and Russian.

tariff
تعريف taʿrīf [taʕrif], notification, specification (from ʿarraf, to notify). The word was widely used in medieval Arabic and meant any kind of notification or specification. Among the Latins the word starts in late medieval commerce on the Mediterranean Sea where it meant a tabular statement of inventory on a merchant ship (bill of lading) or any tabular statement of products and prices offered for sale. In use by Italian and Catalan merchants in the 14th century. Entered French and English in the 16th as a tabular statement. In Spanish the word is absent or very rare before the late 17th. From the meaning of a tabular statement of import tax liabilities on different goods, the meaning of an import tax grew out by metonymy.

tarragon (herb)
طرخون tarkhūn[tˤarxwn], tarragon. The word with that meaning was used by Ibn Al-Baitar (died 1248), who gives a description of the plant and mentions both culinary and medical uses. Tarkhūn comes up in a medical context in Al-Razi (died circa 930), and in a culinary context in Ibn al-Awwam (died circa 1200). In later-medieval Latin (late 12th century onward) it comes up in a medicine context spelled altarcon, tarchon and tragonia and was acknowledged at the time to be from Arabic. Until then in Latin there is no record of the plant under any name, or at least no clear record. Records for Italian tarcone | targone, French targon | tragon, Spanish taragoncia | traguncia, English tarragon and German Tragon all start in the 16th century and all are in a culinary context.

tazza (cup), demi-tasse
طسّ tass | طاسة tāsa | طسّة tassa[tˤaːs], round shallow cup or bowl, which was made of metal, typically made of brass. The word has been in all the western Latinate languages since the 13th and 14th centuries. Medievally the Latinate tasse | taza | taça (ç = z) was very often made of silver and was in the luxury category. The word was common in Arabic for many centuries before it shows up in the Latinate languages. English had it as tass in the 16th century, which continued much later in colloquial use in Scotland, but today's English tazza and demitasse came from Italian and French in the 19th century.

tuna
التنّ al-tunn [tunː], tunafish. The standard etymology report is: Ancient Greek and classical Latin thunnus = "tunafish" -> medieval Arabic al-tunn (or al-tūn) -> medieval Spanish atún -> colloquial American Spanish tuna -> late 19th century California tuna -> international English. (Note: Modern Italian tonno, French thon, and English tunny, each meaning tuna, are descended from the classical Latin without an Arabic intermediary.) (Note: Isidore of Seville (died 636, lived in southern Spain) spelled it thynnus in Latin, where the Latin letter 'y' in Isidore's case was likely pronounced "eu", roughly like in British "tuna", which was roughly how the letter 'y' was pronounced in classical Latin.) (Note: The word was common in ancient Greek and Latin; and common in late medieval Spanish; but a rarity in medieval Arabic, and it is not listed in medieval Arabic dictionaries. The Albacore species of tunafish got its name from 16th century Spanish & Portuguese albacora, which might be from Arabic, although there is no clear precedent in Arabic. In the tuna family the Bonito is another commercial fish species whose name comes from Spanish. The name is in late medieval Spanish, and it might have got there from Arabic, or might not.)

typhoon
from Arabic طُوفَان [tˤwfaːn] see Monsoon

=== V ===
varanoid (in lizard taxonomy), Varanus (lizard genus)
ورل waral[waral] and locally in North Africa ورن waran, varanoid lizard, including Varanus griseus and Varanus niloticus. In Europe in the 16th to 18th centuries it was usually spelled with an L, e.g. "varal" (1677, French), "oûaral" (1725, French), "warral" (1738 English traveller), "worral" (1828 English dictionary). But certain influential European naturalists in the early 19th century adopted the N spelling, "varan". The V in place of W reflects Latinization. Historically in Latin and Romance languages there was no letter W and no sound /w/. varan
vizier
see sultan[wazjr]

=== Z ===
zenith
سمت samt [samt], direction; سمت الرأس samt al-rā's [samtu ʔlrːaʔaːs], direction vertically upwards, zenithal direction, literally the "top direction". Samt al-rā's is in the astronomy books of, for example, Al-Farghani (lived mid 9th century) and Al-Battani (died 929), both of whom were translated to Latin in the 12th century. From its use in astronomy in Arabic, the term was borrowed into astronomy in Latin in the 12th century. The first-known securely-dated record in the Western languages is in the Arabic-to-Latin translation of Al-Battani. Crossref the word nadir, whose first record in the West is in the very same Arabic-to-Latin translation.

zero
صفر sifr [sˤifr], zero. The use of zero as one of the elementary digits was the Hindu-Arabic numeral system's key innovation. Medieval Arabic sifr -> Latin zephirum = "zero" (used in 1202 by Leonardo of Pisa, who was one of the early Latin adopters of the Hindu-Arabic numeral system) -> Old Italian zefiro (used by Piero Borgi in the 1480s) -> contracted to zero in Old Italian before 1485 -> French zéro 1485 -> English zero 1604; rare in English before 1800. Crossref cipher.

=== Addendum for words that may or may not be of Arabic ancestry ===
tambourine
English tambourine is from French tambourin = "small drum" (15th century), which is from French tambour = "drum" (14th century), which is from French tabour = "drum" (13th century), which is from French tabor | tabur = "military drum used by Muslim armies" (12th century). Which is probably from Arabic طبول taboul = "military drums, and any drums". Military drums were not in use in French armies at the time when the word emerged in French in the 12th century as a military drum. Most of the early records in French are in a genre of military-legend ballads known as chansons de geste in which war-drums are pounded by the enemy side only, and the enemy is non-Christian, usually Muslim. First record in French is in the war ballad Chanson de Roland about 1100, featuring a Muslim enemy. Muslim armies standardly used drums from the 10th century onward and taboul is the usual word for drums in Arabic since the beginning of written records. In evaluating this etymology, different people have expressed different views about the prior probability of the phonetic change involved in the step from taboul to tabour.

tartar (a chemical), tartrates (chemicals), tartaric acid
Early records of tartar as a chemical name in Latin are in the mid-12th century in the medical books of the Salernitan school of medicine in southern Italy, spelled tartarum, designating a substance that consisted mainly of what is now called potassium bitartrate. The ancient Greeks and Romans used this substance, including in medicine (e.g. Dioscorides in Greek in the 1st century AD called it trux). The name tartar is not in classical Latin or Greek in any chemical sense, although there was a classical mythological hell called Tartarus. The origin of the medieval Latin name is obscure. A parent in Arabic has been speculatively suggested by a number of dictionaries. A parent in Byzantine Greek is also speculated.

tobacco
Most likely comes from the Arabic word for tobacco طمباقو, (pronounced "tumbaaqoo"). The English word comes from Spanish tabaco. Most of today's English dictionaries derive the Spanish word from the Amerindian language of Haiti. But most of today's Spanish dictionaries derive it from a late medieval Spanish plantname that they say came from a medieval Arabic plantname. The question is unsettled.

traffic
This word, which is in the great majority of European languages today, is seen earliest in early 14th-century Italian. Records from the port of Pisa in the 1320s have noun traffico and verb trafficare. The early meaning was "bringing merchandise to a distant selling market", more often than not by sea, "commerce, especially long-distance commerce". The origin is obscure: various propositions have been aired from Latinate and Arabic sources but none convincingly. The following are Arabic-descended words in English that got established in later medieval Latinate commerce on the Mediterranean Sea with start dates in Italian (also Catalan) earlier than Spanish or Portuguese: arsenal, average, carat, garble, magazine, sequin, tare (weight), and tariff. In view of those borrowings, and because "traffic" lacks a convincing derivation from Latin, an Arabic source for "traffic" is a possibility.

zircon, zirconium
English and French zircon are from German zirkon, which starts in German mineralogists and chemists in the 1780s meaning a zircon gemstone. The German zirkon is almost surely from the pre-existing Italian zargone, Italian giargone, French jargon, which in 18th century Italian and French was a jewellery word meaning zircon gemstones and zircon-like gemstones, in various colors. The German zirkon in the late 1780s was a scientifically defined species of zargone | giargone | jargon. The mineralogists of Italy and France started adopting the German wordform around year 1800 because of its better mineralogical specificity. The Italian zargone | giargone and French jargon gemstone-name was descended from medieval French jargonce, medieval Italian giarconsia, medieval Spanish iargonça, medievally meaning zircon gemstones and zircon-like gemstones, in various colors. It is also in medieval French, Spanish and Italian as jagonce | jagonça | giagonzo with the same meaning. Jagonce was the parent of jargonce. The immediate source of medieval jagonce is not clear. It is demonstrably related to medieval Syriac yaqūndā, a gemstone with about the same meaning, but there is no known basis in Arabic for deriving jagonce from Arabic.

== Notes about the List ==
Obsolete words and very rarely used non-technical words are not included in the list, but some specialist technical words are included. For example, the technical word "alidade" comes from the Arabic name for an ancient measuring device used to determine line-of-sight direction. Despite few English-speaking people being acquainted with it, the device's name remains part of the vocabulary of English-speaking surveyors, and today's instrument uses modern technology, and is included in the list.

There are no words on the list where the transfer from Arabic to a Western language occurred before the ninth century AD; the earliest records of transfer are in ninth century Latin. Before then some words were transferred into Latin from Semitic sources (usually via Greek intermediation), including some that later ended up in English, but in most cases the Semitic source was not Arabic and in the rest of the cases it is impossible to know whether the Semitic source was Arabic or not. See List of English words of Semitic origin, excluding words known to be of Hebrew or Arabic origin.

The list has been restricted to loan words: It excludes loan translations. Here's an example of a loan translation. In Arabic the words for father, mother and son are often used to denote relationships between things. Surrounding the brain and spinal cord is a tough outer layer of membrane called in today's English the dura mater. The words dura = "hard" and mater = "mother" are each in Latin from antiquity. Medieval Latin dura mater [cerebri], literally "hard mother [of the brain]" is a loan-translation of Arabic الأمّ الجافية al-umm al-jāfīa [al-dimāgh], literally "dry-husk mother [of the brain]" (a dry husk is a hard shell), and the translator in this case was Constantinus Africanus (died c. 1087). As another well-known example of a loan-translation, the word "sine"—as in sine, cosine and tangent—has its first record with that meaning in an Arabic-to-Latin book translation in the 12th century, translating Arabic jayb. Jayb had a second and quite unrelated meaning in Arabic that was translatable to Latin as sinus and the translator took up that connection to confer a new meaning to the Latin sinus, in preference to borrowing the foreign word jayb, and the translator was (probably) Gerard of Cremona (died c. 1187). About half of the loan-words on the list have their earliest record in a Western language in the 12th or 13th century. Some additional, unquantified number of terms were brought into the West in the 12th and 13th centuries by Arabic-to-Latin translators who used loan-translations in preference to loan-words. Some related information is at Translations from Arabic to Latin in the 12th century.

== See also ==
- Influence of Arabic on other languages
- List of Islamic terms in Arabic
- List of English words of Sanskrit origin
- List of English words of Persian origin

== General references ==
- Centre National de Ressources Textuelles et Lexicales – etymologies in French language
- Arabismen im Deutschen: lexikalische Transferenzen vom Arabischen ins Deutsche, by Raja Tazi (year 1998). – 400-page book about the German words of Arabic ancestry. Mostly the same words that are seen in English. German got the words mostly from French and Latin, and thirdly from other European languages.
- Baheth.info – searchable copies of large medieval Arabic dictionaries, including the dictionaries by Ibn Manzur, Fairuzabadi, and Al-Jawhari
- Richardson's Persian-Arabic–English Dictionary, year 1852 Edition – 1400 pages; downloadable
- Middle English Dictionary – biggest and best for late medieval English, fully searchable online
- Online Etymology Dictionary – compiled by Douglas Harper – Online Etymology Dictionary
- CollinsDictionary.com – online copy of Collins English Dictionary
- Concise OED – online copy of Concise Oxford English Dictionary
- TheFreeDictionary.com – has online copy of American Heritage Dictionary
- Merriam-Webster's Online Dictionary – online copy of Merriam-Webster's Collegiate Dictionary
- An Etymological Dictionary of Modern English (year 1921), by Ernest Weekley – downloadable, 850 pages, a compilation of short summary etymologies
