= Alkanet =

Alkanet is the common name of several related plants in the borage family (Boraginaceae):

- Alkanet, Alkanna tinctoria, the source of a red dye; this is the plant most commonly called simply "alkanet"
- Various other plants of the genus Alkanna, may be informally called alkanet
- Alkanet or common bugloss, Anchusa officinalis
- Alkanet or field bugloss, Anchusa arvensis
- Bastard alkanet or field gromwell, Lithospermum arvense
- False alkanet, Cynoglottis barrelieri
- Green alkanet, Pentaglottis sempervirens, a blue-flowered plant with evergreen leaves
- Yellow alkanet, Anchusa ochroleuca
