= Check-in (disambiguation) =

Check-in is the process of announcing one's arrival at a hotel, airport, sea port or social network service.

Check-in or check in may also refer to:

- Check In, an album by The Chalets
- Checking In, an American sitcom (1981)
- In revision control, putting a file under configuration control, or to write changes to a repository and allow others to use a file

== See also ==
- Checkout (disambiguation)
