= List of English words of Arabic origin (N–S) =

The following English words have been acquired either directly from Arabic or else indirectly by passing from Arabic into other languages and then into English. Most entered one or more of the Romance languages before entering English.

To qualify for this list, a word must be reported in etymology dictionaries as having descended from Arabic. A handful of dictionaries has been used as the source for the list. Words associated with the Islamic religion are omitted; for Islamic words, see Glossary of Islam. Archaic and rare words are also omitted. A bigger listing including many words very rarely seen in English is available at Wiktionary dictionary.

== Loanwords listed in alphabetical order ==
- List of English words of Arabic origin (A-B)
- List of English words of Arabic origin (C-F)
- List of English words of Arabic origin (G-J)
- List of English words of Arabic origin (K-M)
- List of English words of Arabic origin (N-S)
- List of English words of Arabic origin (T-Z)
- List of English words of Arabic origin: Addenda for certain specialist vocabularies

=== N ===
nadir
نَظِير naẓīr [naðˤiːr], a point on a celestial sphere diametrically opposite some other point; or a direction to outer space diametrically opposite some other direction. That sense for the word was used by, e.g., the astronomer Al-Battani (died 929). Naẓīr in medieval Arabic more broadly meant "counterpart". "The Arabic 'z' here used is the 17th letter of the Arabic alphabet, an unusual letter with a difficult sound, which came to be rendered by 'd' in Low Latin." The word's earliest records in the West are in 12th- and 13th-century Latin astronomy texts as nadahir and nadir, with the same meaning as the Arabic, and the earliest is in an Arabic-to-Latin translation. Crossref zenith, which was transferred from Arabic astronomy to Latin astronomy on the same pathway at the same time.

natron, natrium, kalium
The ancient Greeks had the word nitron with the meaning of naturally occurring sodium carbonate and similar salts. The medieval Arabs had this spelled نطرون natrūn [natˤruːn] with the same meaning. Today's European word natron, meaning hydrated sodium carbonate, is descended from the Arabic. In Europe shortly after sodium was isolated as an element for the first time, in the early 19th century, sodium was given the scientific abbreviation Na from a newly created Latin name, initially natronium then natrium, which goes back etymologically to the medieval and early modern Arabic natrūn. Also in the early 19th century, elemental potassium was isolated for the first time and was soon afterwards given the scientific abbreviation K representing a created Latin name Kalium, which was derived from 18th-century scientific Latin Kali meaning potassium carbonate, which goes back etymologically to medieval Arabic al-qalī, which for the medieval Arabs was a mixture of potassium carbonate and sodium carbonate. Crossref alkali on the list.

=== O ===
orange
نارنج nāranj [naːrindʒ], orange (a citrus fruit), via Persian and Sanskrit nāraṅga from a Dravidian language. The orange tree came from India. It was introduced to the Mediterranean region by the Arabs in the early 10th century, at which time all oranges were bitter oranges. The word is in all the Mediterranean Latin languages from the later medieval centuries. Today it is naranja in Spanish, but arancia in Italian, and orange in French, and this wordform with the loss of the leading 'n' occurs early as Latin arangia (late 12th century).

=== P ===
popinjay (parrot)
ببغاء babaghāʾ | babbaghāʾ [babɣaːʔ], parrot. The change from medieval Arabic sound /b/ to medieval Latin and French sound /p/ also occurs in the loanwords Julep, Jumper, Spinach, and Syrup. The French papegai = "parrot" has a late-12th-century start date and the English dates from a century later. The wordform was affected by the pre-existing (from classical Latin) French gai = Spanish gayo = English "jay (bird)". Parrots were imported to medieval Europe via Arabic speakers.

=== R ===
realgar
رهج الغار rahj al-ghār [rahdʒ ʔlɣaːr], realgar, arsenic sulfide. In medieval times, realgar was used as a rodent poison, as a corrosive, and as a red paint pigment. The ancient Greeks & Romans knew the substance. Other names for it in medieval Arabic writings include "red arsenic" and "rodent poison". Ibn al-Baitar in the early 13th century wrote: "Among the people of the Maghreb it is called rahj al-ghār" (literally: "cavern powder"). In European languages the name's earliest known records are in 13th-century Spanish spelled rejalgar, and 13th-century Italian-Latin spelled realgar. Records in English of the 15th century often spelled it resalgar.

ream (quantity of sheets of paper)
رزمة rizma, bale, bundle. Paper itself was introduced to the Latins via the Arabs in and around the 12th and 13th centuries – the adoption by the Latins went slowly; history of paper. The Arabic word for a bundle spread to most European languages along with paper itself, with the initial transfer from Arabic happening in Iberia. Spanish was resma, Italian risma. The Catalan raima, first record 1287, looks to be the forerunner of the English word-form. The first record in English is 1356.

rook (chess), roc (mythology)
رُخّ rukhkh [ruxː], (1) the rook piece in the game of chess, (2) a mythological bird in the 1001 Arabian Nights tales. The Arabic dictionary Lisan al-Arab completed in 1290 said the chess-piece name rukhkh came from Persian; crossref check. The bird meaning for Arabic rukhkh may have come from Persian too. But not from the same word. All available evidence supports the view that the two meanings of Arabic rukhkh sprang from two independent and different roots. The chess rook is in French from about 1150 onward spelled as roc.

=== S ===
sabkha (landform)
سبخة sabkha [sabx], salt marsh. This Arabic word occurs occasionally in English and French in the 19th century. Sabkha with a technical meaning as coastal salt-flat terrain came into general use in sedimentology in the 20th century through numerous studies of the coastal salt flats on the eastern side of the Arabian peninsula.

safari
سفر safar [safar], journey. Safari entered English in the late 19th century from Swahili language safari = "journey" which is from Arabic safar = "journey".

safflower
عُصفُر ʿusfur [ʕusˤfur], safflower; or a non-standard variant عُصفُر ʿasfar, safflower. The flower of this plant was commercially cultivated for use as a dye in the Mediterranean region in medieval times. From the medieval Arabic word plus Arabic al-, medieval Catalan had alasfor = "safflower". Medieval Catalan also had alazflor = "safflower" where Catalan flor = "flower". But the source of the English word was medieval Italian. The "-fur" or "-far" part of the Arabic word mutated in Italian to "-flore | -fiore" which is Italian for flower. Medieval Italian spellings included asfiore, asflore, asfrole, astifore, affiore, zaflore, saffiore, all meaning safflower. In medieval Arabic dictionaries the spelling is ʿusfur, but an oral variant ʿasfar would be unexceptional in Arabic speech and would be a little better fit to the Romance language wordforms.

saffron
زعفران zaʿfarān [zaʕfaraːn ], saffron. Zaʿfarān meaning saffron is commonplace from the outset of writings in Arabic. It was common in medieval Arab cookery. The ancient Romans used saffron but called it crocus. The earliest known for the name saffron in Latin is year 1156 safranum (location in Genoa in Italy, in a commercial contract). The name saffron became predominant in all the Western languages in the late medieval centuries, in word-forms that led to today's French safran, Italian zafferano, Spanish azafrán. Also English organic chemical safranin.

saphena (saphenous vein)
الصَّافِن Alṣṣāfin [ʔlsˤːaːfin], saphenous vein (saphena vein). The saphena vein is in the human leg. It was one of the veins used in medieval medical bloodletting (phlebotomy), which was the context of use of the word medievally. Medical writers who used the word in Arabic include Al-Razi (died c. 930), Haly Abbas (died c. 990), Albucasis (died c. 1013) and Avicenna (died 1037). In Latin the earliest known record is in an Arabic-to-Latin translation by Constantinus Africanus (died c. 1087) translating Haly Abbas. Bloodletting, which was practiced in ancient Greek and Latin medicine, was revamped in later-medieval Latin medicine under influence from Arabic medicine.

sash (ribbon)
شاش shāsh [ʃaːʃ], a ribbon of fine cloth wrapped to form a turban, and usually made of muslin. Crossref muslin which entered English and other Western languages about the same time. In English the early records are in travellers' reports and among the earliest is this comment from an English traveller in the Middle East in 1615: "All of them wear on their heads white shashes.... Shashes are long towels of Calico wound about their heads." In the later 17th century in English, "shash" still had that original meaning, and additionally it took on the meaning of a ribbon of fine cloth wrapped around the waist. About the beginning of the early 18th century the predominant wordform in English changed from "shash" to "sash". In Arabic today shāsh means gauze or muslin.

sequin (clothing ornament)
سكّة sikka [sikːa], minting die for coins, also meaning the place where coins were minted, and also meaning coinage in general. In its early use in English and French, sequin was the name of Venetian and Turkish gold coins, and it came from Italian zecchino (early 16th century), which came from Italian zecca (early 13th century). Production of the Venetian sequin (coin) ended in 1797. "The word might well have followed the coin into oblivion, but in the 19th century it managed to get itself applied to the small round shiny pieces of metal applied to clothing."

serendipity
This word was created in English in 1754 from "Serendip", an old fairy-tale place, from سرنديب Serendīb [sarandiːb], an old Arabic name for the island of Sri Lanka. Fortified in English by its resemblance to the etymologically unrelated "serenity". The tale with the serendipitous happenings was The Three Princes of Serendip.

sheikh
شيخ shaīkh[ʃjx], sheikh. It has been used in English since the 17th century to refer to a Muslim scholar. In the 20th century it took on a slangy additional meaning of "strong, romantic man". This is attributed to a 1921 movie, The Sheik, starring Rudolph Valentino.

sofa
صُفَّة soffa [sˤufːa], a low platform or dais. The Arabic was adopted into Turkish, and from Turkish it entered Western languages in the 16th century meaning a Middle-Eastern-style dais with rugs and cushions. The Western-style meaning —a sofa with legs— started in late-17th-century French.

spinach
إسبناخ isbinākh in Andalusian Arabic, and إِسفاناخ isfānākh in medieval Arabic but, the main word for it is سبانخ [sabaːnix]. more generally, from Persian aspanākh, spinach. "The spinach plant was unknown to the ancient Greeks and Romans. It was the Arabs who introduced the spinach into Spain, whence it spread to the rest of Europe," and the same is true of the name as well. The first records in English are around year 1400.

sugar, sucrose, sucrase
سكّر sukkar [sukːar], sugar. The word is ultimately from Sanskritic sharkara = "sugar". Cane sugar developed in ancient India originally. It was produced by the medieval Arabs on a pretty extensive scale although it always remained expensive throughout the medieval era. History of sugar. Among the earliest records in England are these entries in the account books of an Anglo-Norman abbey in Durham: year 1302 "Zuker Marok", 1309 "succre marrokes", 1310 "Couker de Marrok", 1316 "Zucar de Cypr[us]". In Latin the early records are about year 1100 spelled zucharum and zucrum. The Latin form sucrum or the French form sucre = "sugar" produced the modern chemistry terms sucrose and sucrase.

sultan, sultana
سلطان sultān [sultˤaːn], authority, ruler. The first ruler to use Sultan as a formal title was an Islamic Turkic-speaking ruler in Central Asia in the 11th century. He borrowed the word from Arabic. In Arabic grammar سلطانة sultāna is the feminine of sultān. Caliph, emir, qadi, and vizier are other Arabic-origin words connected with rulers. Their use in English is mostly confined to discussions of Middle Eastern history.

sumac
سمّاق summāq [sumaːq], sumac species of shrub or its fruit (Rhus coriaria). Anciently and medievally, different components of the sumac were used in leather making, in dyeing, and in medicine. The Arabic geography writer Al-Muqaddasi (died circa 1000) mentions summāq as one of the commercial crops of Syria. Sumac was called rhus in Latin in the classical and early medieval periods. In the late medieval period sumac became the predominant name in Latin. The Arabic name is found in Latin starting in the 10th century and as such it is one of the earliest loanwords on this list. From the Latin, the word is in late medieval English medical books spelled sumac.

Swahili
سواحل sawāhil [sawaːħil], coasts (plural of sāhil, coast). Historically Swahili was the language used in commerce along the east coast of Africa, along 2000 kilometers of coast. Swahili is grammatically a Bantu language, with about one-third of its vocabulary taken from Arabic.

syrup, sherbet, sorbet
شراب sharāb [ʃaraːb ], a word with two senses in Arabic, "a drink" and "syrup". Medieval Arabic medical writers used it to mean a medicinal syrup, and this was passed into Latin in the late 11th century as siropus | siruppus | syrupus with the same meaning. Constantinus Africanus (died c. 1087), who was fluent in Arabic, is the author of the earliest known records in Latin. The change from sound /ʃ/ to sound /s/ in going from sharāb to siroppus reflects the fact that Latin phonology did not use an /ʃ/ sound ever. The -us of siroppus is a carrier of Latin grammar and nothing more. In late medieval Europe a sirup was usually medicinal. Separately from syrup, in the 16th century the same Arabic root word re-entered Western European languages from Turkish. Turkish sherbet | shurbet = "a sweet lemonade" entered with that meaning into Italian and French as "sorbet" and directly into English as "sherbet". The Turkish was from the Arabic word-form شربة sharba(t).

=== Addendum for words that may or may not be of Arabic ancestry ===
racquet or racket (tennis)
Racquet with today's meaning has a late medieval start date. There are unanswered questions about its origin. French raquette (synonymous with Italian racchetta and English racquet) is widely reported as derived from medieval Latin rascete which meant the carpal bones of the wrist and the tarsal bones of the feet. The earliest records of this Latin anatomy word are in two 11th-century Latin medical texts, one of which was by the Arabic-speaking Constantinus Africanus who drew from Arabic medical sources, and surely he did take the anatomy word from Arabic. But there is no evidence to connect the anatomy word with the game word racquet. It would be a big leap in semantics to re-use the bones word as a word for a racquet. To warrant belief that this leap occurred, evidence would be necessary. Other etymology ideas try to connect racquet with other pre-existing words in late medieval Europe, but again with shortfalls in evidence.

scarlet
This word was in all Western European languages in the late medieval centuries. It first appears in European languages in Latin about year 1100 spelled scarlata. The early meaning was a costly, dense and smooth cloth made of wool. The cloth could be any color, but was usually dyed red. In the late medieval centuries the word took on the meaning of red color, concurrently with continued meaning as a high-quality woolen cloth. The origin of the word is an unsettled issue. No candidate parent word in Latin is known of. So an Arabic origin is possible. A specific Arabic source has been proposed, but the evidence for it is not good. A Germanic source has also been proposed and has been preferred by some historians of medieval textiles.

soda, sodium
Soda first appears in Western languages in late medieval Latin and Italian meaning the seaside plant Salsola soda and similar glasswort plants used to make soda ash for use in glassmaking, and simultaneously meaning soda ash itself. In medieval Catalan the name was sosa = "soda ash". Although of uncertain origin, an Arabic origin one way or another is considered likely by many reporters. It is most often said to be from Arabic سواد suwwād or سويدة suwayda, one or more species of glassworts whose ashes yielded soda ash, especially the species Suaeda vera. But that etymon suffers from a want of documentary evidence at a sufficiently early date. Also the Catalan form sosa is historically prior to the Italian form soda. A judgement that soda is "of unknown origin" is very defensible today. The name "sodium" was derived from soda in the early 19th century.
