= List of English words of Arabic origin (C–F) =

The following English words have been acquired either directly from Arabic or else indirectly by passing from Arabic into other languages and then into English. Most entered one or more of the Romance languages before entering English.

To qualify for this list, a word must be reported in etymology dictionaries as having descended from Arabic. A handful of dictionaries has been used as the source for the list. Words associated with the Islamic religion are omitted; for Islamic words, see Glossary of Islam. Obsolete and rare words are also omitted. A bigger listing including many words very rarely seen in English is available at Wiktionary dictionary.

== Loanwords listed in alphabetical order ==
- List of English words of Arabic origin (A–B)
- List of English words of Arabic origin (C–F)
- List of English words of Arabic origin (G–J)
- List of English words of Arabic origin (K–M)
- List of English words of Arabic origin (N–S)
- List of English words of Arabic origin (T–Z)
- List of English words of Arabic origin: Addenda for certain specialist vocabularies

=== C ===
camphor
كافور kāfūr [kaːfuːr], camphor. The medieval Arabs imported camphor by sea from the East Indies for aromatic uses and medical uses. Medieval Arabic general-purpose dictionaries say kāfūr is "well-known". Among the Latins the records begin in the late 9th century (with spelling cafora) though records are scarce until the 12th century. Another imported East Indies wood product which had both aromatic and medical uses in late medieval Europe and had Arabic word ancestry is sandalwood, from Arabic صندل sandal. Ultimately, camphor is derived from the Sanskrit karpūra, referring to camphor throughout India since ancient times.

candy
قند qand + قندي qandī [@qandiː], sugared. Cane sugar developed in ancient India. Medieval Persian qand = "cane sugar" is believed to have probably come from Sanskritic. The plant is native to a tropical climate. The medieval Arabs grew the plant with artificial irrigation and exported some of the product to the Latins. The word candi entered all the Western European languages in the later medieval centuries.

carat (gold purity), carat (mass)
قيراط qīrāt [qjraːtˤ], a small unit of weight, defined as one-twentyfourth (^{1}/_{24}) of the weight of a certain coin namely the medieval Arabic gold dinar, and alternatively defined by reference to a weight of (e.g.) 3 barley seeds. In medieval Arabic the word was also used with the meaning of ^{1}/_{24}^{th} of the money value of a gold dinar coin. In the Western languages the word was adopted as a measurement term for the proportion of gold in a gold alloy, especially in a gold coin, beginning in Italy in the mid-13th century, occurring soon after some city-states of Italy started new issues of pure gold coins.

caravan
قيروان qaīrawān, convoy of travelers journeying together, which could be a merchant convoy or military or other convoy. Qaīrawān is in all the main medieval Arabic dictionaries. It is somewhat frequently used in medieval Arabic writings, even though not nearly as frequently as the synonymous Arabic qāfila. In the Western languages the word has records since the 12th century. The early records are in Latin and they include carvana (1190), caravana (1217), caravanna (1219–1225), karavenna (1250). Possibly slightly earlier is Latin caravana (reportedly 1161). From southern Italy, referring to a caravan of sailing ships, is Latin carabana (1240). All of those Latin records use the word with the same meaning as the Arabic word. The word with this meaning has been continuously in use in the Western languages since then. In Italian, late medieval merchants have it in several kinds of applications contexts, spelled carovana | caravana. It is pretty common in late medieval Italy (e.g., is in Boccaccio's Decameron and Pegolotti's Mercatura). It is not common in French and English until the later 16th century, but French does have late medieval caravane and English has late 15th century carvan. The year 1598 Italian-English dictionary of John Florio has Italian caravana translated to English as English caravan. Arabic qaīrawān came from Persian kārwān with same meaning. Back in the context of the 12th and 13th century, any Persian word would necessarily have to have had intermediation through some other language in order to arrive in a Western language, because there was no contact between Persian and Western languages at the time. In practice the intermediary was Arabic. The majority of the 12th and 13th century Latin records of this word involve travellers in Arabic-speaking lands, especially Latin Crusaders in the Levant, and none are in Iranian-speaking lands.

caraway (seed)
كرويا karawiyā | كراوياء Krāwyāʼ [karawjaːʔ], caraway. The word with that meaning is quite common in mid-medieval Arabic. Spelled "caraway" in English in the 1390s in a cookery book. The English word came from Arabic via medieval Romance languages.

carob
خرّوب kharrūb [xrːwb], carob. Carob beans and carob pods were consumed in the Mediterranean area from ancient times, and had several names in classical Latin. But a name of roughly around carrubia is in Latin from only the 11th or 12th century onward. The late medieval Latin word is the parent of today's Italian carruba, French caroube, English carob.

check, checkmate, chess, exchequer, cheque, chequered, unchecked, checkout, checkbox, checkbook ...
شاه shāh[ʃaːh maːt], king in the game of chess. The many uses of "check" in English are all descended from Persian shah = "king" and the use of this word in the game of chess to mean "check the king". Chess was introduced to medieval Europe through Arabs. The medieval Arabs probably pronounced the last h in shāh harder and more forcefully than how shah is pronounced in English or in today's Arabic. The word is in 11th century Catalan-Latin as escac, then 12th century French as eschac, giving rise to 12th century French eschec, which the English "check" derives from. The "mate" in checkmate is from the medieval Arabic chess term شاه مات shāh māt = "king dies". This too arrived in English through French, starting in French as mat in the 12th century. Italian has scaco mato = "checkmate" in the 12th century. The English word chess arrived from medieval French esches | eschas = "chess" which was the grammatical plural of eschec | eschac = "check". 11th century Catalan-Latin has grammatical plural escachs = "chess" from grammatical singular escac = "check".

chemistry
See alchemy.

cipher, decipher
صفر sifr [sˤifr], zero, i.e. the zero digit in the Arabic number system. The use of zero as one of the elementary digits was a key innovation in the Arabic number system. Latin cifra was the parent of English cipher (or cypher). The word came to Latin Europe with Arabic numbers in the 12th century. In Europe the meaning was originally numeral zero as a positionholder, then any positional numeral, then numerically encoded message. The last meaning, and decipher, dates from the 1520s in English, 1490s in French, 1470s in Italian. But in English cipher also continued to be used as a word for nought or zero until the 19th century.

civet (mammal), civet (perfume)
زباد zabād [zabaːd], civet perfume, a musky perfume excreted from a gland in قطط الزباد qatat al-zabād = "civet cats". The medieval Arabs obtained civet from the African civet and from various civets of the Indies. The word is in 15th-century Italian as zibetto = "civet perfume". Records of the form civet start in Catalan 1372 and French 1401 (cf. e.g. Latin liber -> French livre; Arabic al-qobba -> Spanish alcoba -> French alcove). Incidentally the botanical genus Abelmoschus got its name from Arabic حبّ المسك habb el-misk = "musk seed", a seed yielding a musky perfume.

coffee, café
قهوة [qahwa], coffee. Coffee drinking originated in Yemen in the 15th century. Qahwa (itself of uncertain origin) begot Turkish kahve. Turkish phonology does not have a /w/ sound, and the change from w to v in going from Arabic qahwa to Turkish kahve can be seen in many other loanwords going from Arabic into Turkish (e.g. Arabic fatwa -> Turkish fetva). The Turkish kahve begot Italian caffè. The latter word-form entered most Western languages in the early 17th century. The Western languages of the early 17th century also have numerous records where the word-form was taken directly from the Arabic, e.g. cahoa in 1610, cahue in 1615, cowha in 1619. Cafe mocha, a type of coffee, is named after the port city of Mocha, Yemen, which was an early coffee exporter.

cotton
قطن qutn, qutun [qutˤn], cotton. This was the usual word for cotton in medieval Arabic. The word entered the Romance languages in the mid-12th century and English a century later. Cotton fabric was known to the ancient Romans as an import but cotton was rare in the Romance-speaking lands until imports from the Arabic-speaking lands in the later medieval era at transformatively lower prices.

crimson
قرمزي qirmizī [qrmzj], color of a class of crimson dye used in the medieval era for dyeing silk and wool. The dye was made from the bodies of certain scale insect species. In Latin in the early-medieval centuries this kind of crimson dye was variously called coccinus, vermiculus, and grana. The Arabic name qirmizī | qirmiz enters the records in the Latin languages in the later-medieval centuries, starting in Italy and initially referring in particular to just one of the dyes of the class, the one called Armenian cochineal today. Italian about year 1300 had carmesi | chermisi | cremesi meaning both the dye itself and the crimson color from the dye. Later in the same century Italian added the suffix -ino, producing cremisino = "dyed with cochineal-type crimson dye", and synonymously about year 1400 there was French cremosyn, Spanish cremesin, English cremesyn, Latin cremesinus, where -inus is a Latin and Latinate suffix. English "crimson" started in the form crimesin then contracted to crimsin and then altered to crimson. Crossref kermes, one of the scale-insect species.

curcuma (plant genus), curcumin (yellow dye), curcuminoid (chemicals)
كركم kurkum [kurkum], meaning ground turmeric root, also saffron. Turmeric dye gives a saffron yellow colour. Medieval Arabic dictionaries say kurkum is used as a yellow dye and used as a medicine. Ibn al-Baitar (died 1248) said kurkum is (among other things) a root from the East Indies that produces a saffron-like dye. In the West the early records have meaning turmeric and they are in late medieval Latin medical books that were influenced by Arabic medicine. The word is ultimately derived from the Sanskrit kuṅkuma, referring to both turmeric and saffron, used in India since ancient times for religious ceremonies, pigment dyeing and medicine.

=== D ===
damask (textile fabric), damask rose (flower)
دمشق dimashq [dimaʃq], city of Damascus. The city name Damascus is very ancient and not Arabic. The damson plum – earlier called also the damask plum and damascene plum – has a word-history in Latin that goes back to the era when Damascus was part of the Roman empire and so it is not from Arabic. On the other hand, the damask fabric and the damask rose emerged in the Western European languages when Damascus was an Arabic-speaking city; and apparently at emergence they referred to goods originally sold from or made in Arabic Damascus.

=== E ===
elixir
الإكسير al-iksīr [ʔlʔiiksiːr], alchemical philosopher's stone, i.e. a pulverized mineral agent by which you could supposedly make gold (also silver) out of copper or other metals. The Arabs took the word from Greek xēron, then prepended Arabic al- = "the". The Greek had entered Arabic meaning a dry powder for treating wounds, and it has a couple of records in medieval Arabic in that sense. Al-Biruni (died 1048) is an example of a medieval Arabic writer who used the word in the alchemy sense, for making gold. The Arabic alchemy sense entered Latin in the 12th century. Elixir is in all European languages today.

erg (landform), hamada (landform), sabkha (landform), wadi (landform)
عرق ʿerq [ʕirq], sandy desert landscape. حمادة hamāda, craggy desert landscape with very little sand. Those two words are in use in English in geomorphology and sedimentology. Their entrypoint was in late-19th-century studies of the Sahara Desert.
سبخة sabkha, salt marsh. This Arabic word occurs occasionally in English and French in the 19th century. Sabkha with a technical meaning as coastal salt-flat terrain came into general use in sedimentology in the 20th century through numerous studies of the coastal salt flats on the eastern side of the Arabian peninsula.
وادي wādī, a river valley or gully. In English, a wadi is a non-small gully that is dry, or dry for most of the year, in the desert.

=== F ===
fennec (desert fox)
فنك fenek [fanak]

fennec fox. European naturalists borrowed it in the late 18th century. (In older Arabic writings, fenek also designated various other mammals such as rabbits, which are still called "fenek" in Maltese).

=== Addendum for words that may or may not be of Arabic ancestry ===
caliber, calipers
Excluding an isolated and semantically unclear record in northern France in 1478, the early records are in French in the early and mid 16th century spelled calibre, equally often spelled qualibre, with two concurrent meanings: (1) "the interior diameter of a gun-barrel" and (2) "the quality or comparative character of anything". The source-word for the French is uncertain. A popular idea is that it came from Arabic قالب qālib = "mold" but evidence to support this idea is very scant.

carafe
It is fair to say that carafe starts in the European languages in the 14th century in Sicily—in texts in Latin and Sicilian Italian—spelled carraba, meaning a glass carafe, a glass vase for holding wine. In 1499 it starts in northern Italian as caraffa meaning a carafe made of glass. The word, as carraba and caraffa, looks unprecedented in terms of Latin or Greek. The most popular origin hypothesis is based upon Arabic غرفة gharfa, which in medieval Arabic meant a large spoon or ladle to scoop up water. Gharfa is somewhat off-target semantically and phonetically, and does not have much background historical context to support it.

carrack
This is an old type of large sailing ship. The word's early records in European languages are in the 12th and 13th centuries in the maritime republic of Genoa in Latin spelled carraca | caraca. In descent from the Genoa word, it has records in the late 13th century in Catalan and Spanish, and late 14th in French and English. Today it is most popularly said that the Italian-Latin name was probably somehow adopted from an Arabic word. There are two different propositions for which medieval Arabic word, namely: (1) قراقير qarāqīr = "merchant ships" (plural of qurqūr = "merchant ship") and (2) حرّاقة harrāqa = "kind of warship". There is also a specific alternative proposition that does not involve an Arabic word. The origin remains uncertain and poorly understood. Another old type of sailing ship with possible, probable or definite Arabic word-origin is the Xebec. Another is the Felucca. Another is the Dhow.
cork
The earliest records in England are 1303 "cork" and 1342 "cork" meaning bulk cork bark imported from Iberia. It is widely reported today that the word came from Spanish alcorques = "slipper shoes made of cork". This Spanish "al-" word cannot be found in writing in any medieval Arabic author. Most etymology dictionaries nevertheless state that the Spanish word is almost surely from Arabic because of the "al-". However, there is evidence in Spanish supporting the contrary argument that the "al-" in this case was probably solely Spanish and that the corque part of the Spanish word descended from classical Latin without Arabic intermediation (and to repeat, the evidence in Arabic is that there was no such word in Arabic). The ancient Romans used cork and called it, among other names, cortex (literally: "bark"). From that Latin, medieval and modern Spanish has es:Corcho = "cork material". Corcho is definitely not from Arabic. Corcho is the more likely source for the English word, by reason of semantics.

drub
Probably from ضرب ḍarb, striking or hitting with a cudgel. The word is not in European languages other than English. The English word drub "appears first after 1600; all the early instances, before 1663, are from travellers in the Orient, and refer to the bastinado. Hence, in the absence of any other tenable suggestion, it may be conjectured to represent Arabic ضرب daraba (also pronounced duruba), to beat, to bastinado, and the verbal noun darb (also pronounced durb)."

fanfare, fanfaronade
English fanfare is from French fanfare, which is probably from Spanish fanfarria and fanfarrón and fanfarronear, meaning bluster, grandstanding, and a talker who is full of bravado. Spanish records also have the lesser-used variant forms farfantón | farfante with pretty much the same meaning as fanfarrón. The origin of the Spanish words is obscure and uncertain. An origin in the Arabic of medieval Spain is possible. One Arabic candidate is فرفر farfar | فرفار farfār | فرفرة farfara which is in the medieval Arabic dictionaries with meanings including "lightness and frivolity", "talkative", and "shouting".
