= Garbage (disambiguation) =

Garbage is an unwanted or undesired material or substance discarded by residents. The term is often used interchangeably with municipal solid waste.

Garbage may also refer to:

- Litter, improperly disposed waste products
- Garbage (computer science), unreferenced data in a computer's memory
- Garbage (band), a rock band
  - Garbage (album), the band's debut
- Garbage (EP), a 1995 album by the band Autechre
- Garbage (film), a 2018 Indian erotic drama film
- "Garbage" (Shervin Hajipour song), a 2024 song by Shervin Hajipour
- "Garbage", a song by Bill Steele and Pete Seeger
- "Garbage", a song by Dir En Grey from Withering to Death
- "Garbage", a song by TISM from Machiavelli and the Four Seasons
- "Garbage", a song by Twenty One Pilots from Breach
- "Garbage", a song by Tyler, the Creator from The Music of Grand Theft Auto V
- "Garbage", a song by Melanie Martinez from Hades

== See also ==
- Garbage can, or waste container
- Garbage truck
- Garbage time, sports terminology
- Garbage in, garbage out, phrase in computer science
- Garbology (study of modern refuse and trash)
- Waste (disambiguation)
- Garbage collection (disambiguation)
- Chemical waste
