= Swahili (disambiguation) =

Swahili is a Bantu language officially used in Tanzania, Kenya and Uganda and widely spoken in the African Great Lakes region.

Swahili may also refer to:

- Swahili people, an ethnic group in East Africa
- Swahili culture, the culture of the Swahili people
- Swahili coast, a littoral region in East Africa
