= List of English words of Arabic origin (A–B) =

List Wikipedia article

The following English words have been acquired either directly from Arabic or else indirectly by passing from Arabic into other languages and then into English. Most entered one or more of the Romance languages before entering English.

To qualify for this list, a word must be reported in etymology dictionaries as having descended from Arabic. A handful of dictionaries have been used as the source for the list. Words associated with the Islamic religion are omitted; for Islamic words, see Glossary of Islam. Archaic and rare words are also omitted. A bigger listing including many words very rarely seen in English is available at Wiktionary dictionary.

== Loanwords listed in alphabetical order ==
- List of English words of Arabic origin (A–B)
- List of English words of Arabic origin (C-F)
- List of English words of Arabic origin (G-J)
- List of English words of Arabic origin (K-M)
- List of English words of Arabic origin (N-S)
- List of English words of Arabic origin (T-Z)
- List of English words of Arabic origin: Addenda for certain specialist vocabularies

=== A ===
admiral
أمير amīr [ʔmjr], military commander, also Emir. Amīr is common in medieval Arabic as a commander on land (not sea). In medieval Latin it has lots records as a specifically Muslim military leader or emir. A Latin record of a different kind comes from Sicily in 1072, the year the Latins defeated the Arabs in Sicily at the capital city Palermo. In that year, after about 300 years of Arabic rule in Sicily, a new military governing official at Palermo was assigned as "Knight, to be for the Sicilians the amiratus", where -atus is a Latin grammar suffix. This title continued in mainly non-marine use over the next century among the Latins at Palermo, usually spelled am[m]iratus; spelled amiraldus in year 1113 where -aldus is a Latin suffix that functions much the same as -atus; ammiral year 1112 influenced by Latin suffix -alis. In 1178 (and earlier) the person holding the title amiratus at Palermo was put in charge of the navy of the Kingdom of Sicily. After that start, the use of the word to mean an Admiral of the Sea was taken up in the maritime republic of Genoa starting in 1195 as amirato, and spread throughout the Latin Mediterranean in the 13th century. Medieval Latin word-forms included ammiratus, ammirandus, amirallus, admiratus, admiralius, while in late medieval French and English the usual word-forms were amiral and admiral. The insertion of the letter 'd' was undoubtedly influenced by allusion to the word admire, a classical Latin word.

adobe
الطوب al-tūb | at-tūb [tˤuːb], the brick. The word is in a number of medieval Arabic dictionaries meaning "brick". The Arabic dictionary of Al-Jawhari dated about year 1000 made the comment that the Arabic word had come from the Coptic language of Egypt. In European languages the early records are in medieval Spanish spelled adoba | adova and adobe with the same meaning as today's Spanish adobe, "sun-dried brick". Other cases of Arabic 't' becoming medieval Spanish 'd' include es:Ajedrez, es:Algodón, es:Badana, es:Badea. The word entered English from Mexico in the 18th and 19th centuries.

afrit
عفريت ʿifrīt [ʕfrjt], an ancient demon popularized by the 1001 Arabian Nights tales. The word is also used in the Quran in chapter 27 verse 39. It refers to a type of jinn.

albatross
The medieval Arabic source-word was probably الغطّاس al-ghattās [ɣatˤːaːs] which literally meant "the diver", and meant birds who caught fish by diving, and sometimes meant the diving waterbirds of the pelecaniform class, including cormorants. From this or some other Arabic word, late medieval Spanish has alcatraz meaning pelecaniform-type large diving seabird. From the Spanish, it entered English in the later 16th century as alcatras with the same meaning, and it is also in Italian in the later 16th century as alcatrazzi with the same meaning. The albatrosses are large diving seabirds that are only found in the Southern Hemisphere and the Pacific Ocean regions. Beginning in the 17th century, every European language adopted "albatros" with a 'b' for these birds, the 'b' having been mobilized from Latinate alba = "white".

alchemy, chemistry
الكيمياء al-kīmīāʾ[ʔlkjmjaːʔ], alchemy and medieval chemistry, and especially "studies about substances through which the generation of gold and silver may be artificially accomplished". In Arabic the word had its origin in a Greek alchemy word that had been in use in the early centuries AD in Alexandria in Egypt in Greek. The Arabic word entered Latin as alchimia in the 12th century and was widely circulating in Latin in the 13th century. In medieval Latin alchimia was strongly associated with the quest to make gold out of other metals but the scope of the word also covered the full range of what was then known about chemistry and metallurgy. Late medieval Latin had the word-forms alchimicus = "alchemical" and alchimista = "alchemist". By deletion of al-, those word-forms gave rise to the Latin word-forms chimia, chimicus and chimista beginning in the mid 16th century. The word-forms with and without the al- were synonymous until the end of the 17th century; the meaning of each of them covered both alchemy and chemistry.

alcohol
الكحول al-Kuḥull [ʔlkħwl], very finely powdered stibnite (Sb_{2}S_{3}) or galena (PbS) or any similar fine powder. The word with that meaning entered Latin in the 13th century spelled alcohol. In Latin in the 14th and 15th centuries the sole meaning was a very fine-grained powder, made of any material. In various cases the powder was obtained by crushing, but in various other cases the powder was obtained by calcination or by sublimation & deposition. In the alchemy and medicine writer Theophrastus Paracelsus (died 1541), the alcohol powders produced by sublimation & deposition were viewed as kinds of distillates, and with that mindset he extended the word's meaning to distillate of wine. "Alcohol of wine" (ethanol) has its first known record in Paracelsus. The biggest-selling English dictionary of the 18th century (Bailey's) defined alcohol as "a very fine and impalpable powder, or a very pure well rectified spirit."

alcove
القُبَّة al-qobba[ʔlqubːa], vault, dome or cupola. That sense for the word is in medieval Arabic dictionaries. The same sense is documented for Spanish alcoba around 1275. Alcoba semantically evolved in Spanish during the 14th to 16th centuries. Alcoba begot French alcove, earliest known record 1646, and French begot English.

alembic (distillation apparatus)
الإنبيق al-anbīq [ʔlʔinbjq], "the still" (for distilling). The Arabic root is traceable to Greek ambix = "cup". The earliest chemical distillations were by Greeks in Alexandria in Egypt in about the 3rd century AD. Their ambix became the 9th-century Arabic al-anbīq, which became the 12th-century Latin alembicus.

alfalfa
الفصفصة al-fisfisa [ʔlfasˤfasˤa] (alfalfa. The Arabic entered medieval Spanish. In medieval Spain alfalfa had a reputation as the best fodder for horses. The ancient Romans grew alfalfa but called it an entirely different name; history of alfalfa. The English name started in the far-west US in the mid-19th century from Spanish alfalfa.

algebra
الجبر al-jabr [ʔldʒbr], completing, or restoring broken parts. The word's mathematical use has its earliest record in Arabic in the title of the book "al-mukhtaṣar fī ḥisāb al-jabr wa al-muqābala", translatable as "The Compendium on Calculation by Restoring and Balancing", by the 9th-century mathematician Mohammed Ibn Musa al-Khwarizmi. This algebra book was translated to Latin twice in the 12th century. In medieval Arabic mathematics, al-jabr and al-muqābala were the names of the two main preparatory steps used to solve an algebraic equation and the phrase "al-jabr and al-muqābala" came to mean "method of equation-solving". The medieval Latins borrowed the method and the names.

alidade
العضادة al-ʿiḍāda [ʔlʕidˤaːd] (from ʿiḍad, pivoting arm), the rotary dial for angular positioning on the Astrolabe surveying instrument used in astronomy. The word with that meaning was used by, e.g., the astronomers Abū al-Wafā' Būzjānī (died 998) and Abu al-Salt (died 1134). The word with the same meaning entered Latin in the later Middle Ages in the context of Astrolabes. Crossref azimuth, which entered the European languages on the same pathway.

alkali
القلي al-qalī | al-qilī [ʔlqljːi] or قلويِّ | Qoulawi [qlwjːi], an alkaline material derived from the ashes of plants, specifically plants that grew on salty soils – glassworts aka saltworts. The dictionary of Al-Jawhari (died c. 1003) said "al-qilī is obtained from glassworts". In today's terms, the medieval al-qalī was mainly composed of sodium carbonate and potassium carbonate. The Arabs used it as an ingredient in making ink, glass and making soap. The word's early records in the West are in Latin alchemy texts in and around the early 13th century, with the same meaning as the Arabic.

ambergris and possibly amber
عنبر ʿambar [ʕamːbar], meaning ambergris, i.e. a waxy material produced in the stomach of sperm whales and used historically for perfumery. From Arabic sellers of ambergris, the word passed into the Western languages in the mid-medieval centuries as ambra with the same meaning as the Arabic. In the late medieval centuries the Western word took on the additional meaning of amber, from causes not understood. The two meanings – ambergris and amber – then co-existed for more than four centuries. "Ambergris" was coined to eliminate the ambiguity (the color of ambergris is grey more often than not, and gris is French for grey). It wasn't until about 1700 that the ambergris meaning died out in English amber.

anil, aniline, polyaniline
نيلة nīlah [niːla], indigo dye. Arabic word came from Sanskrit nili = "indigo". The indigo dye originally came from tropical India. From medieval Arabic, anil became the usual word for indigo in Portuguese and Spanish. Indigo dye was uncommon throughout Europe until the 16th century; history of indigo dye. In English anil is a natural indigo dye or the tropical American plant it is obtained from. Aniline is a technical word in dye chemistry dating from mid-19th-century Europe.

apricot
البرقوق al-barqūq[ʔlbarquːq], apricot. Arabic is in turn traceable back to Early Byzantine Greek and thence to classical Latin praecoqua, literally "precocious" and specifically precociously ripening peaches, i.e. apricots. The Arabic was passed onto the late medieval Spanish albarcoque and Catalan albercoc, each meaning apricot. Early spellings in English included abrecok (year 1551), abrecox (1578), apricock (1593), each meaning apricot. The letter 't' in today's English apricot has come from French. In French it starts around the 1520s as abricot and aubercot meaning apricot.

arsenal
دار صناعة dār sināʿa, literally "house of manufacturing" but in practice in medieval Arabic it meant government-run manufacturing, usually for the military, most notably for the navy. In the Italian maritime republics in the 12th century the word was adopted to designate a naval dockyard, a place for building ships and military armaments for ships, and repairing armed ships. In the later-medieval centuries the biggest such arsenal in Europe was the Arsenal of Venice. 12th-century Italian-Latin has the spellings darsena, arsena and tarsanatus. In 14th-century Italian and Italian-Latin the spellings included terzana, arzana, arsana, arcenatus, tersanaia, terzinaia, darsena, and 15th-century tarcenale, all meaning a shipyard and in only some cases having naval building activity. In 16th-century French and English an arsenal was either a naval dockyard or an arsenal, or both. In today's French arsenal continues to have the same dual meanings as in the 16th century.

artichoke
الخرشف al-kharshuf [xrʃuf] | الخرشوف al-kharshūf, artichoke. The word with that meaning has records in medieval Andalusi and Maghrebi Arabic, including at around year 1100. With the same meaning, Spanish alcachofa (circa 1400), Spanish carchofa (1423), Spanish alcarchofa (1423), Italian carciofjo (circa 1525) are phonetically close to the Arabic precedent, and so are today's Spanish alcachofa, today's Italian carciofo. It is not clear how the word mutated to French artichault (1538), northern Italian articiocch (circa 1550), northern Italian arcicioffo (16th century), English archecokk (1531), English artochock (1542), but the etymology dictionaries unanimously say these have to be mutations of the Spanish and Italian word.

assassin
الحشاشين al-Ḥashshāshīn [ʔlħʃaːʃiːn] literally 'hashish-eaters', an Arabic nickname, probably originally derogatory, for the Nizari Ismaili religious sect in the Levant during the Crusades era, with reference to the supposedly erratic behaviour of the members of the sect, as if they were intoxicated by hashish. This sect carried out assassinations against chiefs of other sects, including Crusading Christians, and the story circulated throughout Western Europe at the time (13th century and late 12th). Medievally in Latin & Italian & French, the sect was called the Assissini | Assassini. Medievally in Arabic texts the wordform is al-hashīshīya, but by Arabic grammar this can be put in the form hashīshīn also. Hashīshīn is surely the wordform that the Latin Crusaders borrowed in the Levant. By well-known aspects of Latin & Italian & French phonetics, it is well understood why the wordform got phonetically changed from the Arabic Hashīshīn to the Latinate Assissini. The generalization of the sect's nickname to the meaning of any sort of assassin happened in Italian at the start of the 14th century. The word with the generalized meaning was often used in Italian in the 14th and 15th centuries. In the mid 16th century the Italian word entered French, followed a little later by English.

attar (of roses)
عطر ʿitr [ʕitˤr], perfume, aroma. The English word came from the Hindi/Urdu-speaking area of northeast India in the late 18th century and its source was the Hindi/Urdu atr | itr = "perfume", which had come from the Persian ʿitr = "perfume", and the Persian had come medievally from the Arabic ʿitr.

aubergine
الباذنجان al-bāzinjān [baːðndʒaːn], aubergine. The plant is native to India. It was unknown to the ancient Greeks and Romans. It was introduced to the Mediterranean region by the medieval Arabs. The Arabic name entered Iberian Romance languages late medievally, producing late medieval Spanish alberengena = "aubergine" and Catalan alberginia = "aubergine". The Catalan was the parent of the French aubergine, which starts in the mid-18th century and which embodies a change from al- to au- that happened in French.

average
عُوَار ʿawār [ʕuːaːr], a defect, or anything defective or damaged, including partially spoiled merchandise; and عواري ʿawārī (also عوارة ʿawāra) = "of or relating to ʿawār, a state of partial damage". Within the Western languages the word's history begins in medieval sea-commerce on the Mediterranean. 12th and 13th century Genoa Latin avaria meant "damage, loss and non-normal expenses arising in connection with a merchant sea voyage"; and the same meaning for avaria is in Marseille in 1210, Barcelona in 1258 and Florence in the late 13th. 15th-century French avarie had the same meaning, and it begot English "averay" (1491) and English "average" (1502) with the same meaning. Today, Italian avaria, Catalan avaria and French avarie still have the primary meaning of "damage". The huge transformation of the meaning in English began with the practice in later medieval and early modern Western merchant-marine law contracts under which if the ship met a bad storm and some of the goods had to be thrown overboard to make the ship lighter and safer, then all merchants whose goods were on the ship were to suffer proportionately (and not whoever's goods were thrown overboard); and more generally there was to be proportionate distribution of any avaria. From there the word was adopted by British insurers, creditors, and merchants for talking about their losses as being spread across their whole portfolio of assets and having a mean proportion. Today's meaning developed out of that, and started in the mid-18th century, and started in English.

azimuth
السمت Alssamt|ssamt [samt], the directions, the azimuths. The word was in use in medieval Arabic astronomy including with the Arabic version of the Astrolabe instrument. It was borrowed into Latin in the mid 12th century as azimuth in the context of using Astrolabes. In the mid 13th century in Spanish, açumut | açumuth is in a set of astronomy books that took heavily from Arabic sources and again Astrolabes is the context of use. The earliest in English is in the 1390s in Geoffrey Chaucer's Treatise on the Astrolabe, which used the word about a dozen times.

azure (colour), lazurite (mineral), azurite (mineral), lazulite (mineral)
لازورد lāzward | lāzūard [laːzwrd], lazurite and lapis lazuli, a rock with a vivid blue colour, and this rock was crushed to a powder for use as a blue colourant in inks, paints, eye-makeup, etc. The word is ultimately from the place-name of a large deposit of azure-blue rock in northeastern Afghanistan ("Lajward"), which was the chief and probably the only source-place for the most-desired type of azure-blue rock in the medieval era – the type called Lazurite today. Medievally the word was also used for other types of azure-blue rock that were less costly, especially the type called Azurite today. Latin had azurium and lazurium for the rocks, with records starting in the 9th century. Late medieval English had azure and lazurium for the rocks. From the powdered rocks, azure was a color-name in all the later-medieval Western languages. Today's Russian, Ukrainian and Polish have the colour-name spelled with the letter 'L' (лазурь, lazur).

=== B ===
benzoin, benzene, benzoic acid
لبان جاوي lubān jāwī,[lubːaːn dʒaːwjː] benzoin resin, literally "frankincense of Java". Benzoin is a natural resin from an Indonesian tree. Arab sea-merchants shipped it to the Middle East for sale as perfumery and incense in the later medieval centuries. It first came to Europe in the early 15th century. The European name benzoin is a great mutation of the Arabic name lubān jāwī and the linguistic factors that caused the mutation are well understood. Among European chemists, benzoin resin was the original source for benzoic acid, which when decaboxylated gives benzene.

bezoar
بازهر bāzahr [baːzahr], and بادزهر bādzahr (from Persian pâdzahr), a type of hard bolus, containing calcium compounds, sometimes formed in the stomachs of goats (and other ruminants). Today in English a bezoar is a medical and veterinary term for a ball of indigestible material that collects in the stomach and fails to pass through the intestines. Goat bezoars were recommended by medieval Arabic medical writers for use as antidotes to poisons, particularly arsenic poisons, which is how the word first entered medieval Latin medical vocabulary.

borax, borate, boron
بورق būraq [bawraq], various salts, including borax. Borax (i.e., sodium borate) was in use medievally primarily as a fluxing agent in soldering gold, silver and metal ornaments. The ancient Greeks and Romans used fluxing agents in metalworking, but borax was unknown to them. In medieval Europe there was no borax except as an import from Arabian lands. The Arabs imported at least part of it from India. From Arabic būraq, Latin adopted the name borax | baurach in the 12th century meaning borax for fluxing metals, and sometimes later more loosely meaning any kind of salts for fluxing metals. In medieval Arabic the usual name for borax was تنكار tinkār. This name was adopted by the medieval Latins starting in the 12th century as tincar | atincar with the same meaning. Today's Tincalconite, which is a mineral variant of borax, is descended from the medieval Latin tincar = "borax", conjoined with ancient Greek konis = "powder" plus the conventional suffix -ite. "Boron" and "borate" descend from "borax". Bouquet: باقة

=== Addendum for words that may or may not be of Arabic ancestry ===
alizarin
Alizarin is a red dye with considerable commercial usage. The word's first records are in the early 19th century in France as alizari. The origin and early history of the French word is obscure. Questionably, it may have come from the Arabic العصارة al-ʿasāra = "the juice" (from Arabic root ʿasar = "to squeeze"). A majority of today's dictionaries endorse the al-ʿasāra idea, while a minority say that the connection with al-ʿasāra is improbable.

almanac
This word's earliest securely dated record in the West is in Latin in 1267. A very small number of possibly a little earlier records exist but come with insecure dates. In its early records in Latin it was spelled almanac and it meant a set of tables detailing movements of astronomical bodies. Namely the movements of the five then-known planets and the moon and the sun. A lot of medieval Arabic writings on astronomy exist, and they don't use a word that can be matched to the Latin almanac. One of the words they do use is "zīj" and another is "taqwīm". The 19th-century Arabic-word-origin experts Engelmann & Dozy said about almanac: "To have the right to argue that it is of Arabic origin, one must first find a candidate word in Arabic", and they found none. There is a medieval Arabic المناخ al-munākh, which would be a good fit phonetically, but it has no semantic connection to the Latin almanac. The origin of the Latin remains obscure.

amalgam, amalgamate
This word is first seen in European languages in 13th and 14th century Latin alchemy texts, where it meant an amalgam of mercury with another metal, and it was spelled amalgama. It lacks a plausible origin in terms of Latin precedents. In medieval Arabic records the word الملغم al-malgham | الملغمة al-malghama meaning "amalgam" is uncommon, but does exist and was used by a number of different Arabic writers. Today some English dictionaries say the Latin word was from this Arabic word, or probably was. But other dictionaries are unconvinced, and say the origin of the Latin is obscure.

antimony
This word's first known record is in Constantinus Africanus (died circa 1087), who was a widely circulated medical author in later-medieval Latin (crossref borage). His spelling was "antimonium". The medieval meaning was antimony sulfide. Antimony sulfide was well known to the medieval Arabs under the names ithmid and kohl and well known to the Latins under the name stibi | stibium | stimmi. The medieval Latin name antimonium is of obscure origin. Possibly it is a Latinized form of some Arabic name but no clear precedent in Arabic has been found. In the Western European languages other than Latin, in the late medieval period, antimony is a "bookish" word arriving from the Latin. It is found in medical books and alchemy books.

borage (plant), Boraginaceae (botanical family)
The borage plant is native to the Mediterranean area. It was known to the ancient Greeks and Romans under other names. The name borage is from medieval Latin borago | borrago | borragine. The name is first seen in Constantinus Africanus, an 11th-century Latin medical writer and translator whose native language was Arabic and who drew from Arabic medical sources. Many of today's etymology dictionaries suppose the name to be from Arabic and report the proposition that Constantinus took it from أبو عرق abū ʿaraq = "sweat inducer", because borage leaves supposedly had a sweat-inducing effect and the word would be pronounced būaraq in Arabic. However, in medieval Arabic no such name is on record for borage, and phonetically the match between būaraq and borrago is weak, and Constantinus makes no mention of sweat in connection with borage, and a non-Arabic good alternative proposition exists.
