= Mortise =

Mortise or mortice may refer to:

- Mortise and tenon, a woodworking joint
- Ankle mortise, part of the distal tibia joining the talus bone to form an ankle joint
- Mortise chisel, a type of chisel
- Mortice lock, a lock with a bolt set within the door frame, rather than attached externally
