= Piero Borgi =

Italian mathematician (1424–1484)

Piero Borgi (Venice, 1424–1484) was a versatile Italian mathematician. Borgi is the author of several of the best Italian books on mathematics written in the 15th century. Borgi's books include Addiones in quibus etiam sunt replicae Mathei Boringii, written in 1483; Arithmetica, written in 1484, a book on arithmetic; and Il Libro de Abacho de Arithmetica e De Arte Mathematiche. The later book was so successful that it went through seventeen editions.
