= Checkout =

Checkout may refer to:

- a point of sale terminal
- Google Checkout, Google's online payment services
- Check-Out (The Price Is Right), a segment game from The Price Is Right
- in information management, it means blocking a file for editing; see Revision control
- The Checkout, an Australian television series
- Checkout (Israeli TV series), an Israeli mockumentary-style sitcom

== See also ==
- Check-in (disambiguation)
