= Garbage collection (disambiguation) =

Garbage collection, or waste collection, is part of municipal waste management.

Garbage collection may also refer to:

- Garbage collection (computer science), in automatic memory management
- Garbage collection (SSD), in flash memory
