= Magazine (disambiguation) =

A magazine is a kind of periodical publication.

Magazine may also refer to:

== Storage ==
- Magazine (artillery), a place to store ammunition in warships and fortifications
- Gunpowder magazine, buildings formerly used for storing gunpowder in wooden barrels
- Magazine (firearms), a device that holds ammunition for firearms
- Camera magazine, a light-tight chamber to feed and take up film in a camera

== Music ==
- Magazine (band), a British post-punk band
- Magazine (Heart album), 1977, or the title track
- Magazine (Jump, Little Children album), 1998
- Magazine (Meisa Kuroki album), 2011
- Magazine (EP), by Ailee
- "Magazine" (song), 2018 by Editors
- "Magazine", a song from the album Control by Pedro the Lion, 2002
- The Magazine (album), 1984 by Rickie Lee Jones
- "Magazines" (song), 2008 by The Automatic
- "Magazines", a 2008 song by Moka Only from the album Carrots and Eggs

== Media ==
- Magazine (TV channel), an Argentine TV channel
- The Magazine (magazine), a Canadian entertainment magazine
- Magazine (Lebanese magazine), Lebanese weekly official known as L'Hebdo Magazine

== Places ==
=== England ===
- Magazine Gateway, an entrance to Leicester Castle

=== United States ===
- Magazine, Arkansas, a town in the United States
- Mount Magazine, the tallest mountain in Arkansas
- Magazine Street, a location in New Orleans

== See also ==
- Magazin, a Croatian pop band
