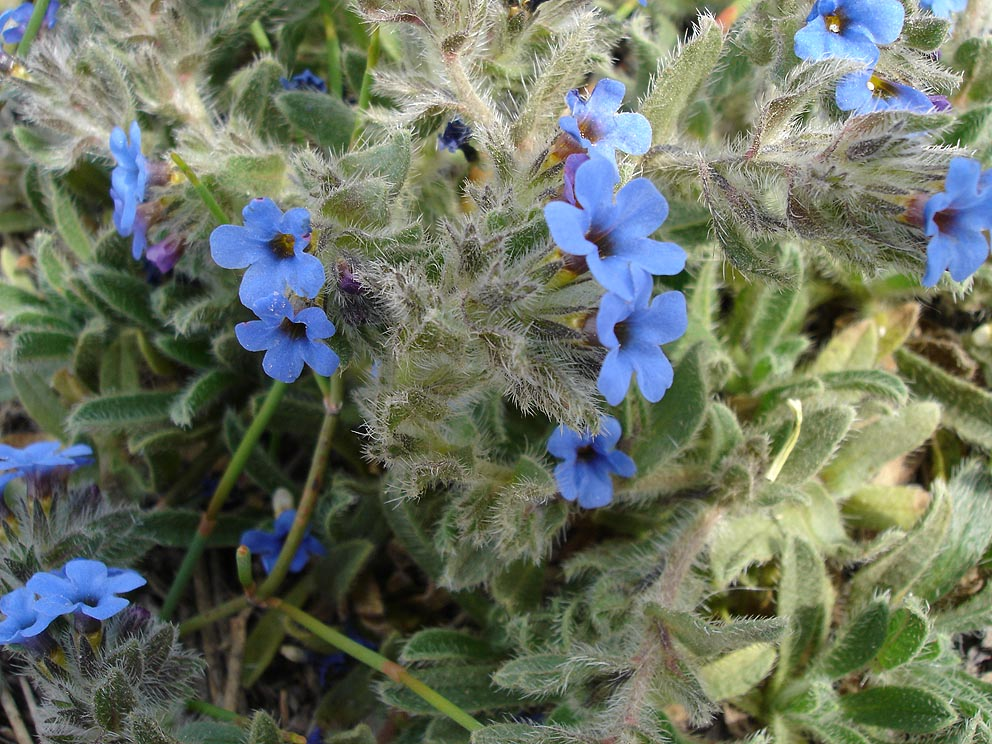
- Dyer's alkanet

Scientific classification
- Kingdom: Plantae
- Clade: Embryophytes
- Clade: Tracheophytes
- Clade: Spermatophytes
- Clade: Angiosperms
- Clade: Eudicots
- Clade: Asterids
- Order: Boraginales
- Family: Boraginaceae
- Genus: Alkanna
- Species: A. tinctoria

Binomial name
- Alkanna tinctoria (L.) Tausch

= Alkanna tinctoria =

Species of flowering plant

Alkanna tinctoria, the dyer's alkanet or simply alkanet, is a herbaceous flowering plant in the borage family Boraginaceae. Its roots are used to produce a red dye. The plant is also known as dyers' bugloss, orchanet, Spanish bugloss, or Languedoc bugloss. It is native to the Mediterranean region.

== Description ==
Alkanna tinctoria has a bright blue flower.

The root is blackish outside, blue-red inside, with a whitish core. It is native to the Mediterranean region.

A. tinctoria has 30 chromosomes and is regarded as a dysploid at the tetraploid level (4x + 2).

== Taxonomy and distribution ==
The subspecies Alkanna tinctoria ssp. tinctoria is distributed all around the Mediterranean and the Balkans, and eastwards to Ukraine, but is absent from the Alpine region, Corsica and the Balearic Islands. It is introduced in Germany. The species has a large number of synonyms, starting with Linnaeus's Anchusa tinctoria in 1762.

== Dyestuff ==
The root produces a fine red colouring material, which has been used as a dye in the Mediterranean region since antiquity. The dyestuff in its roots is insoluble in water but can be extracted using alcohol or other organic solvents such as oils. It is used to colour some cheeses and low-quality wines.

Powdered and mixed with oil, the alkanet root is used as a wood stain. When mixed into an oily environment, it imparts a crimson color to the oil, which when applied to wood moves the wood's color towards dark-red-brown (resembling that of rosewood), and accentuates the grain of the wood. In alkaline environments, alkanet dye is blue; in the presence of acids it gradually changes to crimson.

The colouring agent in A. tinctoria root has been chemically isolated and named alkannin. In Australia, alkannin is approved for use as a food colouring; in the European Union, it is called E103 but its approval for use has been withdrawn. It has been used as a colorant for products such as lipstick.

In English in the late medieval era, the name alkanet meant A. tinctoria. In the centuries since then, the name has come to be used informally for some other plants related to it.
