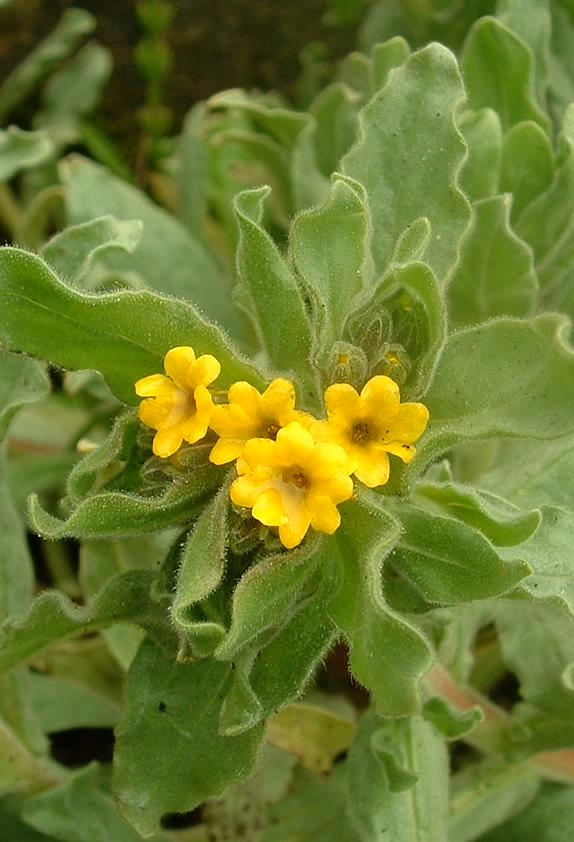
- Alkanna orientalis

Scientific classification
- Kingdom: Plantae
- Clade: Embryophytes
- Clade: Tracheophytes
- Clade: Spermatophytes
- Clade: Angiosperms
- Clade: Eudicots
- Clade: Asterids
- Order: Boraginales
- Family: Boraginaceae
- Subfamily: Boraginoideae
- Genus: Alkanna; Tausch, 1824

Type species
- Alkanna tinctoria (L.) Tausch

Species
- 66; see text

Synonyms
- Alcanna Orph. (1870); Baphorhiza Link (1829); Camptocarpus K.Koch (1842), nom. superfl.; Campylocaryum DC. ex Meisn. (1840); Oskampia Moench (1794); Rhytispermum Link (1829)

= Alkanna =

Genus of flowering plants in the borage family

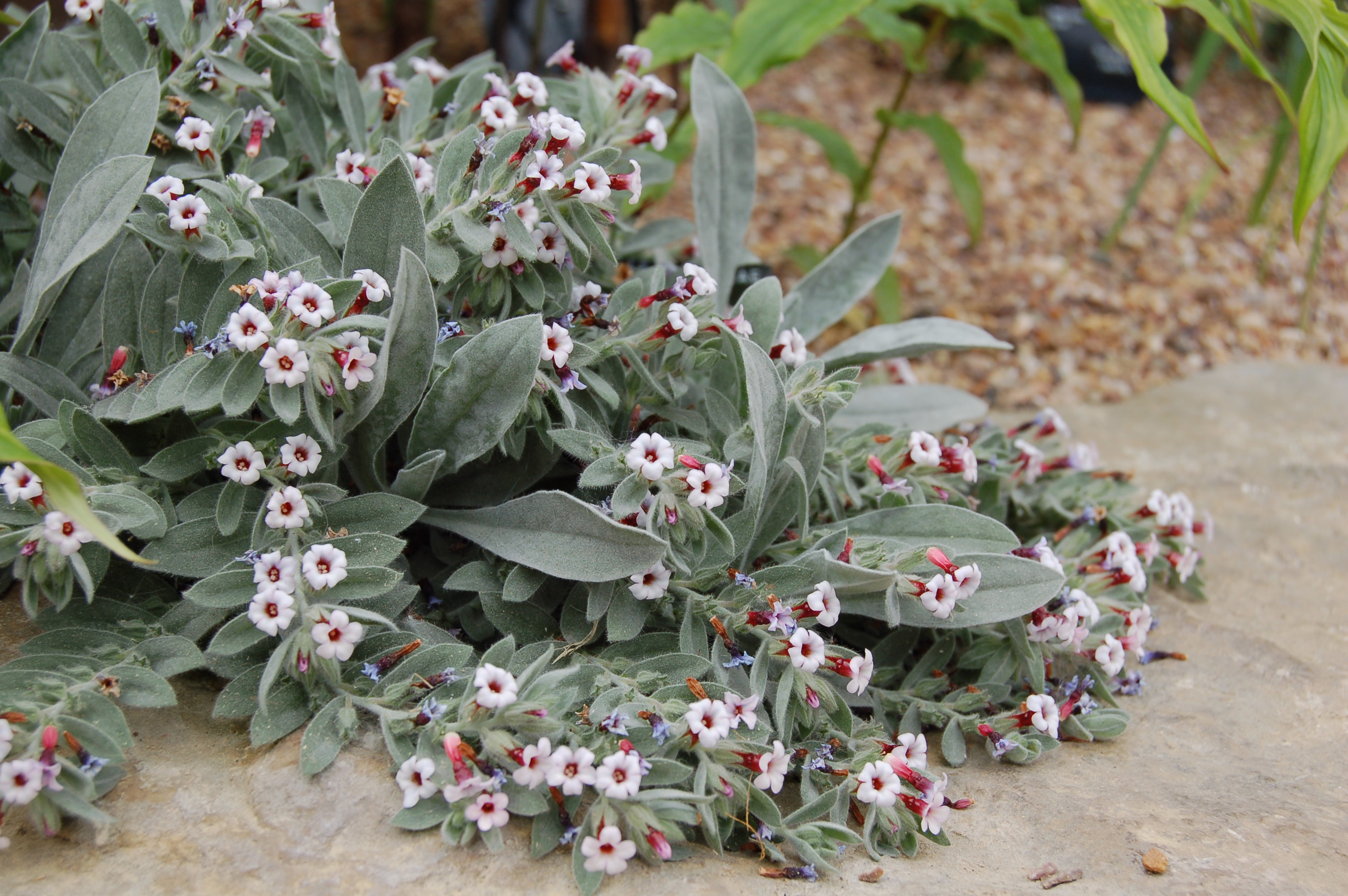
Alkanna oreodoxa

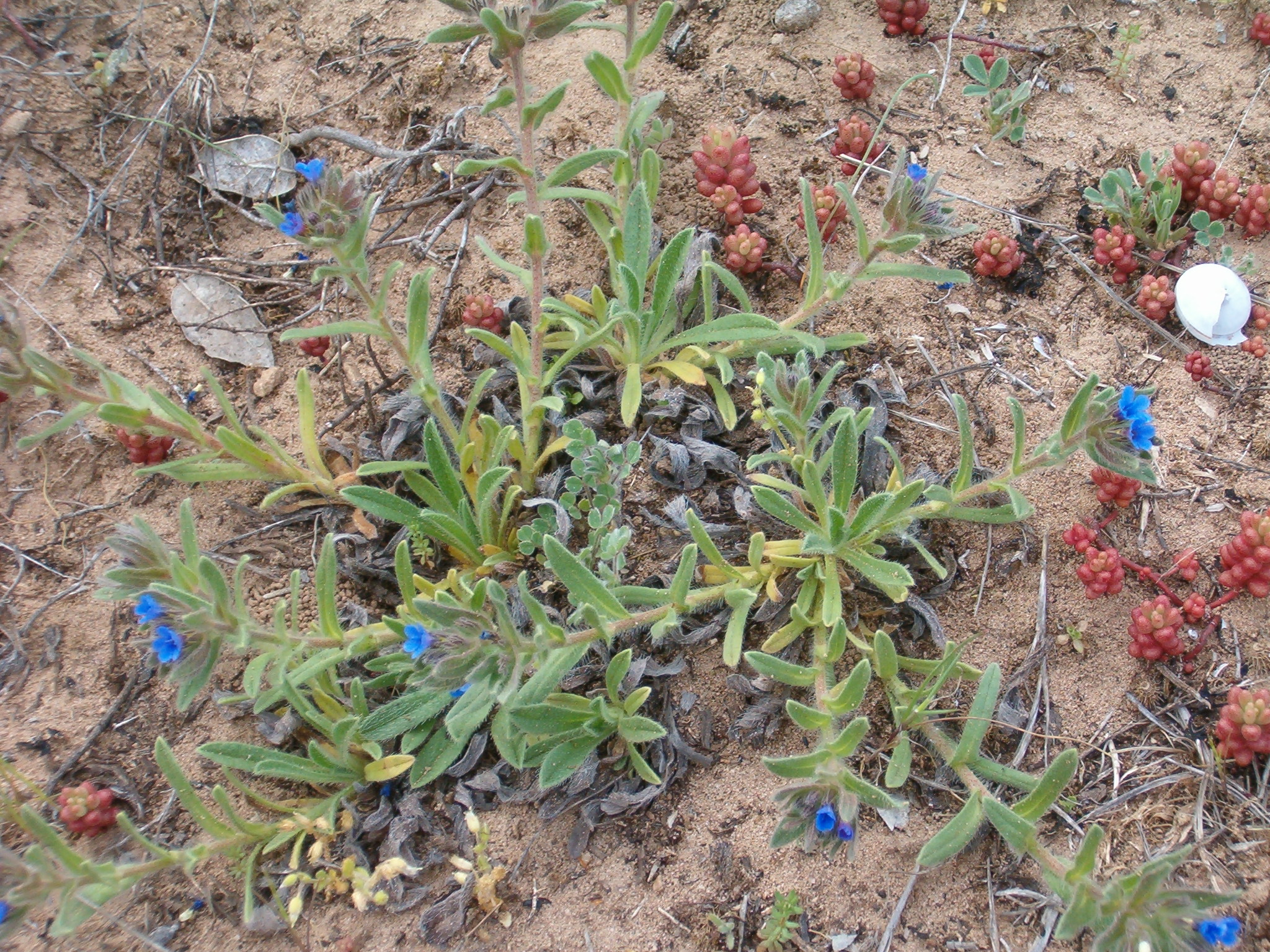
Alkanna tinctoria with bright blue flowers

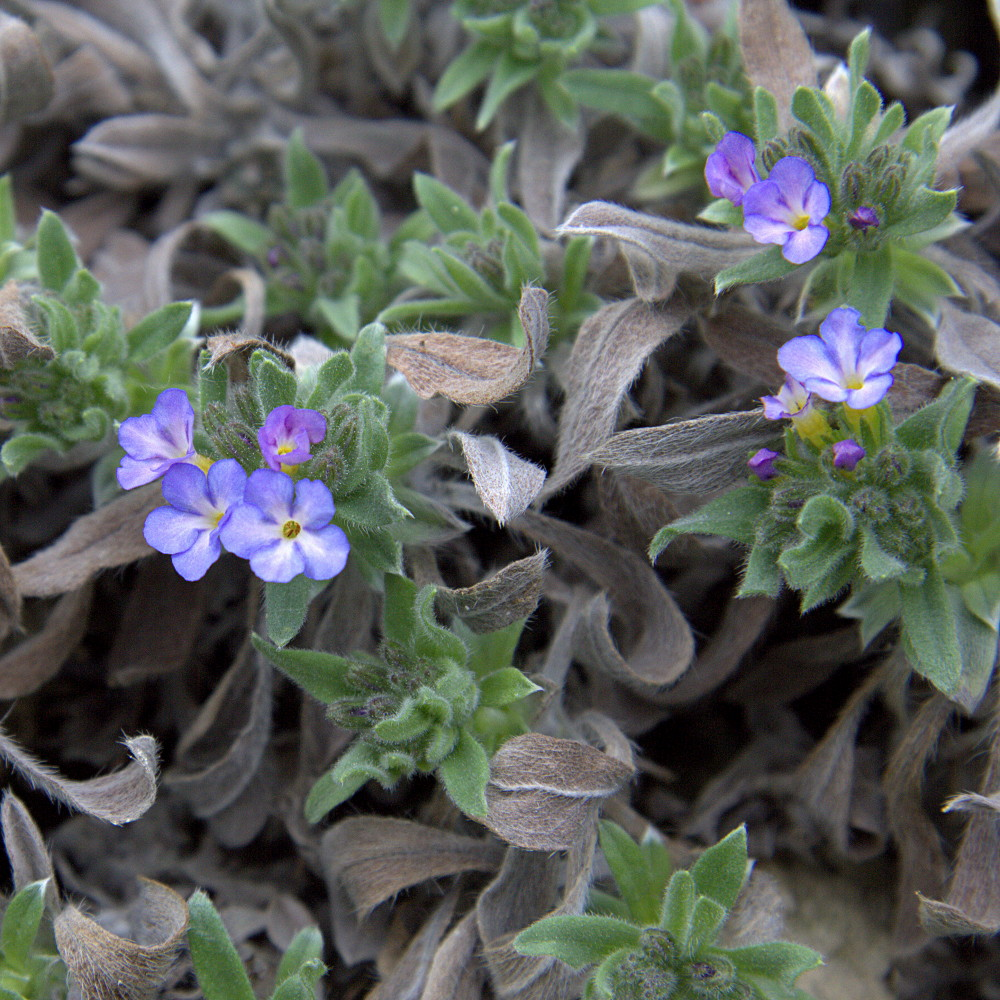
Alkanna aucheriana

Alkanna is a genus of herbaceous plants in the family Boraginaceae. It includes 66 species native to southern and east-central Europe, western Asia, and North Africa.

== Species ==
66 species are accepted.

- A. amana Rech.f.
- A. angustifolia Sümbül
- A. areolata Boiss.
- A. attilae P.H.Davis
- A. aucheriana A.DC.
- A. auranitica Mouterde
- A. bracteosa Boiss.
- A. caliensis Heldr. ex Boiss.
- A. cappadocica Boiss. & Balansa
- A. chrysanthiana Kit Tan
- A. confusa Sam. ex Rech.f.
- A. corcyrensis Hayek
- A. cordifolia K.Koch
- A. dumanii Sümbül
- A. frigida Boiss.
- A. froedinii Rech.f.
- A. galilaea Boiss.
- A. graeca Boiss. & Spruner
- A. haussknechtii Bornm.
- A. hellenica (Boiss.) Rech.f.
- A. hirsutissima (Bertol.) A.DC.
- A. hispida Hub.-Mor.
- A. incana Boiss.
- A. jordanovii St.Kozhukharov
- A. kotschyana A.DC.
- A. leiocarpa Rech.f.
- A. leptophylla Rech.f.
- A. lutea A.DC.
- A. macrophylla Boiss. & Heldr.
- A. macrosiphon Boiss. & Heldr.
- A. malatyana Şenol & Yıldırım
- A. maleolens Bornm.
- A. megacarpa A.DC.
- A. methanaea Hausskn.
- A. milliana Sümbül
- A. mughlae H.Duman, Güner
  & Cagban
- A. noneiformis Griseb.
- A. oreodaxo Hub.-Mor.
- A. orientalis (L.) Boiss.
- A. pamphylica Hub.-Mor. & Reese
- A. pelia (Halácsy) Rech.f.
- A. phrygia Bornm.
- A. pinardi Boiss.
- A. pindicola Hausskn.
- A. prasinophylla Rech.f.
- A. primuliflora Griseb.
- A. pseudotinctoria Hub.-Mor.
- A. pulmonaria Griseb.
- A. punctulata Hub.-Mor.
- A. sandwithii Rech.f.
- A. sartoriana Boiss. & Heldr.
- A. saxicola Hub.-Mor.
- A. scardica Griseb.
- A. semiromica Ranjbar & Khalvati
- A. shattuckia Post
- A. sieberi A.DC.
- A. sieheana Rech.f.
- A. stojanovii St.Kozhukharov
- A. stribrnyi Velen.
- A. strigosa Boiss. & Hohen.
- A. sumbulii Yıld.
- A. tinctoria (L.) Tausch
- A. trichophila Hub.-Mor.
- A. tubulosa Boiss.
- A. verecunda Hub.-Mor.
- A. viscidula Boiss.
