= List of English words of Semitic origin =

This is a list of English words of Semitic origin other than those solely of Arabic origin or Hebrew origin.

Most of these words are found in ancient Greek writings, with the Greek word believed today to have come from a Semitic source.

== Common words ==
abba
from Aramaic ܐܒܐ abba 'father' (AHD)
abbé
from Aramaic ܐܒܐ abba 'father' (AHD, MW)
abbot
from Aramaic ܐܒܐ abba 'father' (AHD, MW)
abracadabra
disputed (OED) + probably Balkan (WNW) + probably from Aramaic אבדא כדברא abhadda kedhabhra 'disappear as this word' (NI)
adonis
from Phoenician 𐤀𐤃𐤋 adon 'lord' (AHD)
aloe
from ancient Greek ἀλόη aloe (AHD) 'dried juice' (MW). Likely from a Semitic source. See Hebrew אהלים 'ahalim 'trees of lign' (SC), perhaps in turn from Dravidian
alphabet
The ancient Greek word represents the first two letters of the Greek alphabet (alpha and beta). The Greeks got their alphabet from the Phoenician/Canaanite one. Compare Canaanite 'aleph 'ox' (AHD) + from Phoenician/Canaanite bet 'house' (AHD)
apron
from Latin mappa 'cloth' (MW), probably from Hebrew menafa 'fluttering banner' (WNW) + perhaps from Carthaginian (AHD)
arbiter
from Latin arbitr-, arbiter 'judge' (MW), from Phoenician (AHD)
babel
from (AHD, MW) Hebrew בבל balal 'confound' (SC) + in part from (AHD) Akkadian 𒇷𒄿 𒀊𒁀 bab-ilu 'gate of God' (MW)
balm
from Greek βάλσαμον balsamon (AHD), probably of Semitic origin, similar to Hebrew basham 'aromatic substance' (MW)
balsam
from Greek βάλσαμον balsamon (AHD), probably of Semitic origin, similar to Hebrew basham 'aromatic substance' (MW)
bdellium
from Greek βδέλλιον bdellion (MW), from (AHD) Hebrew בְּדֹלַח bedolach (WNW) 'pieces' (SC) + from Assyrian 𒁍𒁺𒆷𒄷 budulḥu (WNW)
byssus
from Greek bussos (AHD), perhaps from בוץ buts (WNW) 'linen cloth', from Semitic (MW) *b-w-tz 'to be white' (WNW)
birr
from Arabic بير birr '100 cents' (MW), probably from Amharic (AHD)
camel
from Greek κάμηλος kamelos (AHD). From Semitic. See Hebrew גמל gamal 'desert animal', Arabic jamal 'camel'.
camisado
secondarily; by way of Spanish camisa, "shirt". But of dubious Semitic origin. See "chemise" below.
camisole
from a southern-Romance diminutive of late Latin camisia. But questionably Semitic. See "chemise" below.
cane, cannella, canister, cannelloni, cannon, cannula, canon, canyon
from Greek κάννα kanna (AHD), of Semitic origin. See Hebrew קָנֶה "qaneh" 'tube', 'reed' (WNW) + Assyrian qanu (WNW), similar to Arabic qanah 'hollow stick', 'reed' (MW)
chemise
from (Vulgar) Latin camisia (MW), itself from proto-Celtic. Ugaritic has qms 'garment' (AHD). That word is similar, and shows the same k>q pattern that the later Semitic loanwords show. But a Semitic origin for camisia is a minority position in scholarship.

cinnamon
from Greek κιννάμωμον kinnamomon (MW), of Semitic origin, similar to Hebrew קִנָּמוֹן qinnamon 'aromatic inner bark' (AHD)
cumin
from Greek (AHD) κύμινον kyminon (MW), perhaps from Hebrew כמון kammon 'umbel' (WNW), similar to Akkadian kamunu 'carrot family plant' (MW)
deltoid
from Greek delta (AHD), perhaps from Hebrew דלת daleth 'door' (WNW), similar to Phoenician dalt 'door' (AHD)
earnest (money)
from (MW, AHD) Hebrew ערב arav 'pledge' (WNW) + from Canaanite 'irrabon 'pledge', 'surety' (AHD)
fig
from Latin ficus, possibly from Phoenician or Paleo-Hebrew 𐤂𐤐 "pag", as found in Song of Songs 2:13
goat
from proto-Germanic *gaits,

cognate with Latin haedus 'kid', likely of Semitic origin. Compare Hebrew גדי ”gdi” 'kid'.

hyssop
from Greek (AHD) ὕσσωπος hyssopos (MW), of Semitic origin. Compare Hebrew אזוב 'ezobh 'mint herb' (WNW)
iotacism
from Greek Ιώτα iota, a letter from (MW) Phoenician (AHD). Compare Hebrew יד yodh 'hand' (WNW).
jot
from Matthew 5:18 transliterating Greek Ιώτα iota. The subtext was the Hebrew letter yodh as written in the Aramaic alphabet in that verse's setting.
maudlin, madeleine, magdalen
from (NI) Greek Μαγδαλα 'Magdala' (WNW) (='tower'), perhaps from Hebrew גדל gadal 'large' (SC) and (MW) Aramaic Magdela 'Magdala' (OED) (='tower') (SC)
map
from Latin mappa 'cloth' (MW). Said by Quintilian (1st century AD in Latin) to be a word of Punic origin. Compare Talmudic Hebrew menafa 'fluttering banner' (Etymonline.com)(AHD)(WNW).
mat
from Greek ματτα matta, of Semitic origin (MW), perhaps from Phoenician 𐤌𐤀𐤕𐤕𐤀 matta, similar to Hebrew מטה mitta 'bed', 'couch' (AHD)
myrrh
English is from classical Latin myrrha which is from ancient Greek murra which is from a Semitic source; see Aramaic murra, Akkadian murru, Hebrew mōr, Arabic mur, all meaning myrrh.
messiah
from Hebrew (AHD) משיח mashiah 'anointed' (MW) + in part from Aramaic (AHD) meshiha 'anointed' (MW)
napkin
from Latin mappa 'cloth' (MW), probably from Hebrew menafa 'fluttering banner' (WNW) + perhaps from Carthaginian (AHD)
pharisee
from Aramaic (AHD) perisha 'separated', from (MW) פרש Hebrew parash 'separate' (SC), 'cleave' (WNW)
sac, sack
from ancient Greek σάκκος sakkos. Of Semitic origin (OED); see Hebrew שק saq 'bag', 'sackcloth', from Phoenician, Aramaic/Syriac ܣܩܐ saqqa, similar to Akkadian saqqu (AHD)
sapphire
from Latin sapphirus and Greek sappheiros, from a Semitic source. See Hebrew ספיר sappir 'precious stone' (AHD). The word is perhaps ultimately from Sanskrit शनिप्रिय sanipriya 'sacred to Sani'
schwa
from Hebrew שוא schewa' 'unstressed mid-central vowel' (MW), probably from Syriac ܫܘܝܐ shewayya 'equal' (AHD)
shekel
from Hebrew (MW) שקל saqal 'weight', from Canaanite tql (AHD)
souk
from Arabic سوق suq (AHD) 'market' (MW), from Aramaic ܫܘܩܐ/שוקא šuqa' 'street', 'market', from Akkadian 𒊓𒆪 saqu 'narrow'
sycamore
Ancient Greek συκόμορος sykomoros 'fig tree', looks to be ancient Greek syko- 'fig' and ancient Greek moros 'mulberry tree'. But the Greek is perhaps from a Semitic source. See Hebrew שִׁקמָה shikma 'mulberry' (WNW).

== Letter names ==
alpha
from Greek Άλφα alpha, perhaps from Phoenician alef 'ox', 'leader' (WNW), from Canaanite 𐤀𐤋𐤐 'alp 'ox' (AHD)
beta
from Greek Βήτα beta, from Phoenician (WNW) + from Canaanite 𐤁𐤉𐤕 bet 'house' (AHD)
gamma
from Greek Γάμμα gamma, perhaps from Phoenician גימ"ל gimel '
delta
from Greek Δέλτα delta (AHD), perhaps from Hebrew דל"ת daleth 'door' (WNW) + of Semitic origin, similar to Phoenician 𐤕𐤋𐤀𐤃 dalt 'door' (AHD)
zeta
from Greek ζήτα zeta, from Phoenician, similar to Aramaic ܙܝܢܐ zayin, Hebrew זי"ן zayin (AHD) 'weapon'
eta
from Greek Ήτα eta, perhaps from Hebrew chet חי"ת (WNW) 'terror' (SC) + from (MW) Phoenician 𐤕𐤇 (AHD)
theta
from Greek Θήτα theta, from (MW) Phoenician 𐤕𐤄𐤈, similar to Hebrew טי"ת tet (AHD) 'snake'
iota
from Greek Ιώτα iota, perhaps from Hebrew יו"ד yodh 'hand' (WNW) + from (MW) Phoenician 𐤕𐤏𐤉 (AHD)
kappa
from Greek Κάππα kappa, perhaps from Hebrew כ"ף kaph (WNW) 'palm of the hand' (MW) + from (MW) Phoenician 𐤅𐤀𐤊 (AHD)
lambda
from Greek Λάμβδα lambda, perhaps from Hebrew למ"ד lamedh 'whip', 'club' (WNW) + from (MW) Phoenician 𐤃𐤌𐤀𐤋 (AHD)
mu
from Greek Μυ mu, from Phoenician, similar to Hebrew מ"ם mem 'water' (AHD)
nu
from Greek Νυ nu, perhaps from Hebrew נו"ן nun 'fish' (WNW) + of Semitic origin (AHD)
pi
from Greek Πι pi, perhaps from Hebrew פ"א pe 'mouth' (WNW) + from (MW) Phoenician 𐤄𐤐 (AHD)
rho
from Greek Ρω rho, perhaps from Hebrew רי"ש rosh 'head' (WNW) + from (MW) Phoenician 𐤔𐤏𐤓 (AHD)
sigma
from Greek Σίγμα sigma, from Phoenician, similar to Hebrew סמ"ך samek (AHD) 'prop'
tau
from Greek Ταυ tau, perhaps from Hebrew ת"ו taw (WNW) 'mark', 'cross' (MW) + from (MW) Phoenician 𐤅𐤀𐤕 (AHD)
izzard
probably from French et zede 'and Z', in part from Greek ζήτα zeta (MW), from Phoenician, similar to Aramaic ܙܝܢܐ zayin, Hebrew זי"ן zayin (AHD) 'weapon'
zed
from Greek ζήτα zeta (MW), from Phoenician, similar to Aramaic ܙܝܢܐ zayin, Hebrew זי"ן zayin (AHD) 'weapon'

== See also ==
- List of English words of Arabic origin
- List of English words of Hebrew origin
- List of loanwords in Assyrian Neo-Aramaic
