= Abomination (Bible) =

Covering Biblical references

Abomination (from Latin abominare 'to deprecate as an ill omen') is an English term used to translate the Biblical Hebrew terms shiqquts שיקוץ and sheqets שקץ, which are derived from shâqats, or the terms תֹּועֵבָה, tōʻēḇā (noun) or ta'ev (verb). An abomination in English is that which is exceptionally loathsome, hateful, sinful, wicked, or vile. The term shiqquts is translated abomination by almost all translations of the Bible. The similar words, sheqets, and shâqats, are almost exclusively used to refer to unclean animals.

The common but slightly different Hebrew term, tōʻēḇā, is also translated as abomination in the Authorized King James Version, and sometimes in the New American Standard Bible. Many modern versions of the Bible (including the New International Version and New English Translation) translate it detestable; the New American Bible translates it loathsome. It is mainly used to denote idolatry; and in many other cases it refers to inherently evil things such as illicit sex, lying, murder, deceit, etc.; and for unclean foods.

== Analysis of the term ==
=== Shiqquts ===
Shiqquts is used in the following ways:

1. In prophecies in Daniel 11:31 (cf. 12:11), it is generally interpreted as referring to the fearful calamities that were to fall on the Jews in the time of Antiochus IV Epiphanes, saying, "And they shall place the abomination that maketh desolate." Jerome, and most of the Christian fathers, suppose that the reference is to Antiochus as the type of Antichrist, and that the description passes from the type to the antitype. Idolatry is presented as the chief sin in the Bible, and shiqquts is often used to describe such.
2. In his campaign of Hellenization, Antiochus caused an altar to be erected on the altar for burnt-offerings of the Second Temple, on which pig sacrifices were offered to Zeus Olympios. (Comp. 1 Maccabees 1:54). Following the wording of Daniel 9:27, this may have been the abomination of desolation of Jerusalem.
3. sinful sacrifices (Isaiah 66:3)
4. idolatry (Deuteronomy 29:17, Ezekiel 20:7,8, 1Kings 11:5–7, Jeremiah 13:27)
5. witchcraft (2 Kings 23:24)

The word sheqets is used with reference to:

1. seafood that lacks fins and scales (Leviticus 11:10–12)
2. all insects except for locust, crickets and grasshoppers (Leviticus 11:20–23, Leviticus 11:41)
3. eagles, ossifrage, and the osprey (Leviticus 11:13)
4. other biblically unclean animals or touching certain things,(Leviticus 7:21)

Consequently, these animals were unclean and therefore eating them was forbidden. The exception is Leviticus 11:41, where those who eat unclean insects are made abominable (using a verb derived from tōʻēḇā).

Shâqats is rendered in the KJV as follows:

1. abominable (Leviticus 11:43, Leviticus 20:25)
2. abomination (Leviticus 11:11, Leviticus 11:13)
3. abhorred (Psalms 22:24)
4. detest (Deuteronomy 7:26)

=== Tōʻēḇā ===
Tōʻēḇā is used in the following ways:

1. Every shepherd was "an abomination" unto the Egyptians (Genesis 46:34).
2. Pharaoh was so moved by the fourth plague, that while he refused the demand of Moses, he offered a compromise, granting to the Israelites permission to hold their festival and offer their sacrifices in Egypt. This permission could not be accepted, because Moses said they would have to sacrifice "the abomination of the Egyptians" (Exodus 8:26).
3. Proverbs 6:16–19 lists seven things which are also abominations: "haughty eyes, a lying tongue, hands that shed innocent blood, a heart that devises wicked schemes, feet that are swift in running to mischief, a false witness who utters lies, and one who spreads strife among brothers."

Tōʻēḇā is also used in Jewish (and Christian Old Testament) scriptures to refer to:

1. idolatry or idols (Deuteronomy 7:25, Deuteronomy 13:14, Isaiah 44:19)
2. illicit sex (e.g. prostitution, adultery, incest) (Ezekiel 16:22,58, Ezekiel 22:11, Ezekiel 33:26)
3. illicit marriage (Deuteronomy 24:2–4)
4. a man "lying with a man as with a woman" (see Homosexuality in the Hebrew Bible) (Leviticus 18:22, Leviticus 18:27–30, Leviticus 20:13)
5. temple prostitution (1Kings 14:24)
6. offerings from the above (Deuteronomy 23:18)
7. child sacrifice to Molech (Jeremiah 32:35)
8. cross-dressing (Deuteronomy 22:5)
9. cheating in the market by using rigged weights (Deuteronomy 25:16, Proverbs 11:1)
10. dishonesty (Proverbs 12:22)
11. pride (Proverbs 16:5)
12. unclean animals (Deuteronomy 14:3)
13. stealing, murder, and adultery, breaking covenants (Jeremiah 7:9,10)
14. usury, making unethical or immoral monetary loans that unfairly enrich the lender, oppressing the poor and needy, etc. (Ezekiel 18:10–13)

Tâ‛ab is rendered the following ways in the KJV

1. abhor, 9 Deu 7:26, Deu 23:7 (2), Job 9:31, Job 30:10, Psa 5:6, Psa 119:163, Amo 5:10, Mic 3:9;
2. abominable, 6 1Ch 21:6, Job 15:16, Psa 53:1 (2), Isa 14:19, Eze 16:52;
3. abhorred, 3 Job 19:19, Psa 106:40, Eze 16:25;
4. abhorreth, 2 Psa 107:18, Isa 49:7;
5. abominably, 1 1Ki 21:26;
6. committed, 1 Eze 16:52.

== See also ==
- The Bible and homosexuality
- Damnation
- Fire and brimstone
- Gehinnom
- Hell
- Leviticus 18
- Religion and homosexuality
- Shiksa and shegetz, Yiddish slang words deriving from sheqets
- Tophet
- Total depravity
- Abomination (Judaism)
