= List of English words of Hebrew origin =

This is a list of English words of Hebrew origin. Transliterated pronunciations not found in Merriam-Webster or the American Heritage Dictionary follow Sephardic/Modern Israeli pronunciations as opposed to Ashkenazi pronunciations, with the major difference being that the letter taw (ת) is transliterated as a 't' as opposed to an 's'.

There is a separate list of English words of Semitic origin other than those solely of Hebrew or Arabic origin.

== From Hebrew words ==
abacus
from אבק 'avaq 'dust' (AHD), probably from Greek ἄβαξ abax 'slab' (MW)
agora (currency)
from (AHD) אגורה agorah 'small coin' (MW), from Greek agora "an assembly of the People" from ageirein "to assemble
aliyah
from (AHD) עלייה 'aliyah 'ascent' (MW)
almemar
from אלממר 'almemar 'bema', from Arabic المنبر al-minbar 'pulpit' (AHD)
amen
from אמן 'amen (MW) 'certainly', 'verily' (AHD)
armageddon
from הר מגידו har megido 'mount megido' (AHD)
baal
from בעל ba'al 'lord' (AHD, MW)
babel
from (AHD, MW) בלל balal 'confound' (SC) + in part from Akkadian 𒇷𒄿 𒀊𒁀 bāb-ilu 'gate of god' (MW)
bar mitzvah
from (AHD) בר מצוה bar miṣwah 'son of the commandment' (MW)
bath (volume)
from בַּת bath (MW) '10 gallons liquid measure' (AHD) from Greek βαθύς (bathus), "deep",
bat mitzvah
from (AHD) בת מצוה bath miṣwah 'daughter of the commandment' (MW)
behemoth
from (MW) בהמות behemoth 'beasts' (AHD)
bethel
from (AHD) ביתאל beth'el 'house of God' (MW)
bethesda (chapel)
(OSPD) from (AHD) Greek Bethesda 'Bethesda' (WNW), probably from bayith chesed 'house of kindness' (SC)
bris
from (WNW) ברית b'rith 'covenant' (MW)
brith milah
from (WNW) בְּרִית מִילָה b'rith milah 'covenant of circumcision' (MW)
cab (volume)
from (MW) qab 'hollow vessel' (AHD)
cabal
from (AHD) קַבָּלָה qabbalah 'received (lore)' (MW)
challah
from (AHD) חלה ḥallah 'egg-rich yeast-leavened bread' (MW)
chazan, hazan
from חזן ḥazzan 'cantor' (MW) + in part from Aramaic, both from Akkadian (AHD)
cherub
from (AHD) כרוב kerubh 'celestial hierarchy angel' (MW)
chutzpah
from (AHD) חֻצְפָּה ḥuṣpah 'supreme self-confidence' (MW)
cider
from (AHD) שכר shekhar 'strong drink' (MW)
copacetic
disputed (MW) + perhaps from כל בצדק kol beṣedeq 'all with justice' (AHD), or כל בסדר kol beseder ‘all is in order’ (MW)
cor (volume), kor (volume)
from kor (AHD, WNW) '100 gallons capacity' (MW)
corban
from (AHD) קָרְבָּן qorban 'offering' (MW)
dybbuk
from דיבוק dibbuq 'wandering soul' (AHD, MW)
edenic
from (WNW) עדן 'eden 'delight' (AHD)
ephah
from (AHD) איפה ephah '1/10 homer dry measure', from Egyptian (MW)
galilee
from Latin galilaea (AHD, MW), from גליל galiyl 'circle', 'circuit' (SC)
ganef
from (AHD) גנב gannabh 'thief' (MW)
gerah
from (MW) גרה gerah 'grain', 'bean' (AHD)
get (divorce document)
from גט get 'document of release' (MW)
golem
from גולם golem (AHD) 'shapeless mass' (MW)
goy
from גוי goy 'nation' (AHD, MW)
gun moll
from (AHD) גנב gannabh 'thief' (MW) + from מִרְיָם Miryam (AHD) 'Miriam' (MW, OED) (='rebelliously') (SC) + perhaps from Egyptian (HH)
habdalah
from (AHD) habhdalah 'separation' (MW)
haftarah, haphtarah
from (MW, WNW) patar 'separate', 'discharge' (AHD)
haggadah
from (AHD, MW) heged 'a saying' (WNW)
halacha
from הלכה halakhah 'way' (MW)
hallelujah, alleluia
from הללויה halleluyah 'praise the LORD' (AHD, MW)
halutz
from hlṣ 'be in the vanguard' (WNW)
hebraize
from (MW) עברי 'ibhri (AHD) 'region across [descendant]' (SC)
heder
from חדר heder 'room' (MW)
homer (volume)
from (AHD, MW) חמר hamar 'surge up', 'swell up' (WNW), Greek ὅμηρος (hómēros), "hostage"
hosanna
from (AHD) hoshi'ah-nna 'save please' (MW)
jubilee
from (AHD) יובל yobhel 'ram's horn' (MW)
judas
from (MW) יהודה yehuda (AHD) 'celebrated' (SC)
kabbalah, cabala
from (AHD) קַבָּלָה qabbalah 'received (lore)' (MW)
kaddish
from (AHD, MW) qds 'sanctify' (WNW)
kashrut
from (AHD, MW) כשר ksr 'be appropriate' (WNW)
kibbutz
from קיבוץ qibbuṣ (MW) 'gathering' (AHD)
kibosh
disputed (AHD, MW) + perhaps from כבש kabash 'tread down', 'disregard'
kiddush
from (AHD) qiddush 'sanctification' (MW)
klezmer
from (AHD) כלי זמר k'ley zemer 'musical instruments' (MW)
knesset
(OSPD) from kanas 'assemble' (AHD, WNW)
kosher
from (AHD, MW) כשר ksr 'be appropriate' (WNW)
chayyim
(OSPD) from ḥaim 'to life' (WNW)
leviathan
from (AHD) לויתן liwyathan 'sea monster, whale' (MW)
macabre
from French (danse) macabre (AHD, MW), probably from Latin (Chorea) Machabaeorum, from מקבת maqqebet 'hammer' (WNW), from נקב naqab 'perforate' (SC)
maftir
(OSPD) from maphtir 'one that dismisses' (NI)
mahzor
from (AHD) ḥzr 'return' (WNW)
manna
from מן man (AHD, MW) (SC)
matzo
from (AHD) מצה maṣah 'unleavened bread' (MW)
maven
from (AHD) מבין mebhin 'one who is experienced' (MW), 'one who understands' (OED)
mazeltov
from (WNW) מזל טוב mazzal tob 'good luck' (AHD)
mazuma
from (WNW) מזומן mezumman 'fixed' (AHD)
megillah
from (MW, WNW) galal 'roll' (AHD)
menorah
from (AHD) מנורה menorah 'candlestick' (MW)
meshuga
from (AHD) משוגע meshugga 'crazy' (MW).
messiah
from (AHD) משיח mashiaḥ 'anointed' (MW) + in part from Aramaic (AHD) meshiha 'anointed' (MW)
mezuzah
from מְזוּזָה mezuzah 'doorpost' (AHD, MW)
midrash
from (AHD) מדרש midrash 'exposition', 'explanation' (MW)
mikvah
from miqwah 'purification bath' (AHD)
minyan
from מִנְיָן minyan 'number', 'count' (MW), from Aramaic (AHD)
mitzvah
from (AHD) מצוה miṣwah 'commandment' (MW)
mohel
from מוהל mohel 'person qualified to perform circumcision' (WNW)
momser
from momser 'bastard' (WNW)
mishpachah
from mishpahah 'family', 'clan' (NI)
moshav
from (AHD) מוֹשָׁב moshabh 'dwelling' (MW)
nabla
probably from nebhel 'harp' (NI)
nachas
pleasure, satisfaction, delight; proud enjoyment (usage: I have nachas from you) (from Hebrew נחת pronounced 'nachat') (WNW)
nebel
from nebhel 'harp' (NI)
omer
from עמר 'omer (AHD) '1/10 ephah dry capacity' (MW)
parashah
from parashah 'explanation' (MW, WNW)
pascal
from 'Pascal' (AHD, MW), from פסח pesah 'passover' (AHD, MW, OED)
paschal
from פסח על pasah al 'passed over' (AHD, MW, OED)
pharaoh
from פרעה par'oh 'ruler of ancient Egypt', from Egyptian (MW) O1 O29 pr-'o 'great house' (AHD)
pharisee
from Aramaic (AHD) perisha 'separated', from (MW) פרש parash 'separate' (SC), 'cleave' (WNW)
rabbi
from (AHD, WNW) רב rabh 'master' (MW)
rebbe
from (AHD, WNW) רב rabh 'master' (MW)
rebbetzin
from (WNW) רב rabh 'master' (MW)
sabbatical
from (MW) שׁבת shabbat 'day of rest' (AHD)
sabra
from (AHD) ṣabar 'prickly pear' (MW)
satanic
from שטן satan 'adversary' (MW), 'devil' (AHD)
schmooze
from (AHD) שמועות shemu'oth 'news', 'rumor' (MW)
schwa
from שוא schewa' 'unstressed mid-central vowel' (MW), probably from Syriac ܥܗܘܐܝܝܐ sewayya 'equal' (AHD)
seder
from (AHD) סדר seder 'order' (MW)
selah
from (AHD) סֶלָה selah (MW) 'suspension', 'pause' (SC)
seraph
from (MW) שׂרף saraph 'celestial being' (AHD)
shadchan
(OSPD) from shiddekh 'arrange a marriage' (NI)
shadrach
(OSPD) from (AHD) shadrach 'captive' (WNW)
shalom
from (AHD) שָׁלוֹם shalom 'peace' (MW)
shalom aleichem
from (AHD) שָׁלוֹם עֲלֵיכֶם shalom 'alekhem 'peace unto you' (MW)
shammes
from (AHD) שמש shammash 'sexton' (MW)
shamus
perhaps from (AHD) שמש shammash 'sexton' (MW)
shegetz
from (AHD) שקץ sheqes 'blemish', 'abomination' (MW)
shekel
from (MW) שקל saqal 'weigh', from Canaanite tql (AHD)
sheol
(OSPD) from se'ol 'underworld' (AHD), perhaps from shaal 'dig' (WNW)
shibboleth
from (AHD) שיבולת shibboleth 'stream' (MW), 'ear of grain' (OED)
shiksa
from (AHD, WNW) שקץ sheqes 'blemish', 'abomination' (MW)
shivah
from (AHD) shibh'ah 'seven' (MW)
shofar
from shophar (MW) 'ram's horn' (AHD)
siddur
from סידור siddur 'arrangement' (AHD), 'order' (MW)
sukkah
from סוכה sukkah 'booth', 'shelter' (MW)
sycamine
from (AHD, MW) שִׁקמָה shiqmah 'mulberry tree' (OED)
tallith
from (MW) tillel 'cover' (AHD)
talmudism
from (MW) lamad 'learn' (AHD)
teraph
from (AHD) תרפים teraphim 'household god' (MW)
torah
from תּוֹרָה tora 'law', 'instruction' (AHD)
tref
from taraph 'tear' (AHD)
tsuris
from (AHD) ṣarah 'calamity' (WNW)
tush, toches
from (AHD) תחת tahath 'under', 'beneath' (MW)
tzitzit, zizith
from (AHD) ציצית ṣiṣith 'fringes', 'tassels' (MW)
ulpan
from aleph 'ox', 'leader' (WNW)
yeshiva
from (AHD) ישיבה yeshibhah 'talmudic school' (MW)
yid
from יהודה yehudah (AHD) 'celebrated' (SC)
zaddik
from צדיק ṣaddiq 'just', 'righteous' (MW)

== From Hebrew names ==
abelia
from 'Abel' (AHD, MW), from הבל Hebhel 'Abel' (='emptiness') (SC)
abelian
from 'Abel' (AHD, MW), from הבל Hebhel 'Abel' (='emptiness') (SC)
abigail
from (MW) אֲבִיגַיִל (SC) Avigail 'Abigail' (='father of exaltation') (HH)
adam-and-eve
from אדם Adam 'Adam' (MW) (='earth') (HH) + from חוה Hawwah 'Eve' (MW) (='living') (HH)
ammonite
from עַמּוֹן Ammon, Biblical tribe
bedlam
from (AHD, MW) בית לחם Beth Leḥem 'Bethlehem' (='house of bread')
bejesus
from (AHD) יֵשׁוּעַ Yeshu'a 'Jesus' (MW) (='Jehovah-saved') (SC)
benday
from (AHD) Binyamin 'Benjamin' (MW) (='son of [the] right hand') (SC) + from Old English (AHD, MW)
cassia
from קסיה qəṣi`â
davit
from (AHD) דָּוִד Dawid 'David' (MW) (='loving') (SC)
hamantasch
from Haman, a biblical villain (MW) + tash, multiple etimologies; from Yiddish (MW)
hansom
from 'Hansom' (MW), from 'Hans', from Yohanan 'John' (='the LORD is gracious') (HH)
jack
1 from יוחנן Yohanan 'John' (MW) (='the LORD is gracious') (HH)
2 perhaps from יַעֲקֹב Ya'aqobh 'Jacob' (MW) (='he has protected') (AHD)
jacket
from יַעֲקֹב Ya'aqobh 'Jacob' (MW) (='he has protected') (AHD)
jacobean
from יַעֲקֹב Ya'aqobh 'Jacob' (MW) (='he has protected') (AHD)
jacquard
from 'Jacquard' (AHD, MW), from יַעֲקֹב Ya'aqobh 'Jacob' (MW) (='he has protected') (AHD)
jacquerie
from יַעֲקֹב Ya'aqobh 'Jacob' (MW) (='he has protected') (AHD)
jakes
perhaps from יַעֲקֹב Ya'aqobh 'Jacob' (MW) (='he has protected') (AHD)
jeez
from (AHD) יֵשׁוּעַ Yeshu'a 'Jesus' (MW) (='Jehovah-saved') (SC)
jehu
from יהוא Yehu 'Jehu' (MW) (='Jehovah [is] He') (SC)
jeremiad
from (AHD) יִרְמְיָה Yirmeyah 'Jeremiah' (MW) (='the LORD will rise') (SC)
jeroboam
from (AHD, MW) יָרָבְעָם Yarobh'am 'Jeroboam' (='people will contend') (SC)
jesuit
from יֵשׁוּעַ Yeshu'a 'Jesus' (AHD) ('Jehovah-saved') (SC)
jezebel
from (AHD) איזבל Izebhel 'Jezebel' (MW) (='chaste') (SC)
jimmy
from (MW) 'James' (AHD), from יַעֲקֹב Ya'aqobh 'Jacob' (MW, OED) (='he has protected') (AHD)
jockey
from (AHD) יוחנן Yohanan 'John' (MW) (='the LORD is gracious') (HH)
joe
from יוֹסֵף Yoseph 'Joseph' (MW) (='he shall add') (HH)
john (washroom)
from (AHD) יוחנן Yohanan 'John' (MW) (='the LORD is gracious') (HH)
johnny (gown)
from (AHD) יוחנן Yohanan 'John' (MW) (='the LORD is gracious') (HH)
jorum
perhaps from (AHD, MW) Yehoram 'Joram' (='Jehovah-raised') (SC)
joseph
from (AHD) יוֹסֵף Yoseph 'Joseph' (MW) (='he shall add') (HH)
lazar
from (AHD) אלעזר El'azar 'Lazarus' (MW) (='God is my help') (HH)
lazaretto
from (AHD) אלעזר El'azar 'Lazarus' (MW) (='God is my help') (HH) + from (MW) נָצְרַת natzerath 'Nazareth' (WNW)
macadam
from 'McAdam' (MW), in part from Adham 'Adam' (='earth') (HH)
macadamia
from 'Macadam' (MW), in part from Adham 'Adam' (='earth') (HH)
marionette
from מִרְיָם Miryam (AHD) 'Miriam' (MW, OED) (='rebelliously') (SC) + perhaps from Egyptian (HH)
marry (interjection)
from מִרְיָם Miryam (AHD) 'Miriam' (MW, OED) (='rebelliously') (SC) + perhaps from Egyptian (HH)
mick
from Mikha'el 'Michael' (MW) (='who [is] like God?') (SC)
mickey (drink)
perhaps from (AHD) Mikha'el 'Michael' (MW) (='who [is] like God?') (SC)
miquelet
probably from Catalan Miquel (NI), from Mikha'el 'Michael' (MW) (='who [is] like God?') (SC)
moll
from מִרְיָם Miryam (AHD) 'Miriam' (MW, OED) (='rebelliously') (SC) + perhaps from Egyptian (HH)
nance
from 'Nancy' (MW, AHD), probably in part from חנה Ḥannah 'Anna' (OED) (='favored') (HH, SC)
nimrod
from (AHD) נמרוד Nimrodh 'Nimrod' (='hunter') (MW)
philistine
1 from פלשתים Pelistim 'Philistines' 'Aegean people who settled Philistia' (AHD)
2 from (MW) פלשת Pelesheth 'Philistia' (='rolling', 'migratory') (SC)
rube
(AHD) from רְאוּבֵן Re'ubhen 'Reuben' (MW) (='see ye a son') (SC)
samaritan
from (AHD, MW) שֹׁמְרוֹן Shomron 'Samaria' (='watch-station') (SC)
semitist
from שם Shem 'Shem' (MW) (='name') (SC)
simony
from (AHD) שִׁמְעוֹן Shim'on 'Simon' (MW) (='hearing') (HH, SC)
sodom
from (MW) סדום s'dom 'Sodom' (AHD, OED) (='burnt') (SC)
toby
from (AHD, MW) טוביה Toviah 'Tobias' (='goodness of Jehovah') (SC)
yankee
probably from (AHD) יוחנן Yohanan 'John' (MW) (='the LORD is gracious') (HH)

== Letter names ==
aleph, beth, gimel, daleth, he, waw, zayin, heth, teth, yod, kaph, lamed, mem, nun, samekh, ayin, pe, sadhe, qoph, resh, shin, taw (AHD, MW, WNW)

alpha
from Greek Άλφα alpha, perhaps from אלף aleph 'ox', 'leader' (WNW) + from Canaanite 𐤀𐤋𐤐 'alp 'ox' (AHD)
beta
from Greek Βήτα beta, from בית bet 'house', probably from Phoenician (WNW) + from Canaanite 𐤁𐤉𐤕 bet 'house' (AHD)
gamma
from Greek Γάμμα gamma, perhaps from גמל gimel 'ruminant beast' (WNW) + from Phoenician 𐤋𐤌𐤀𐤂 (AHD)
delta
from Greek Δέλτα delta (AHD), perhaps from דלת deleth 'door' (WNW) + of Semitic origin, akin to Phoenician 𐤃𐤀𐤋𐤕 dalt 'door' (AHD)
eta
from Greek eta, perhaps from chet (WNW) 'terror' (SC) + from (MW) Phoenician 𐤇𐤕 (AHD)
iota
from Greek Ιώτα iota, perhaps from יד yodh 'hand' (WNW) + from (MW) Phoenician 𐤉𐤏𐤕 (AHD)
kappa
from Greek Κάππα kappa, perhaps from כף kaph (WNW) 'palm of the hand' (MW) + from (MW) Phoenician 𐤊𐤀𐤅 (AHD)
lambda
from Greek Λάμβδα lambda, perhaps from למד lamedh 'whip', 'club' (WNW) + from (MW) Phoenician 𐤋𐤀𐤌𐤃 (AHD)
nu
from Greek Νυ nu, perhaps from נון nun 'fish' (WNW) + of Semitic origin (AHD)
pi
from Greek Πι pi, perhaps from פה pe 'mouth' (WNW) + from (MW) Phoenician 𐤐𐤄 (AHD)
rho
from Greek Ρω rho, perhaps from ראש rosh 'head' (WNW) + from (MW) Phoenician 𐤓𐤏𐤔 (AHD)
tau
from Greek Ταυ tau, perhaps from taw (WNW) 'mark', 'cross' (MW) + from (MW) Phoenician 𐤕𐤀𐤅 (AHD)

== See also ==
- Lists of English words of international origin
- List of English words of Yiddish origin
- Hebraism
