= I Married a Jew =

1939 essay

- Author: Gretchen Lewis
- Language: English
- Genre: Autobiography
- Published in: The Atlantic
- Publication date: January 1939
- Media type: Print

"I Married a Jew" is an essay by Gretchen Lewis published in The Atlantic in the January 1939 issue. It discusses her marriage to a Jewish man, referred to as Ben in the article. Herself being a Christian White American of German descent, she describes her marriage as an interracial marriage. The article also discusses the assimilation of Jews and other minorities into a white American mainstream culture. She writes that she frequently tries "to see things from the Nazis' point of view," to "the hurt confusion" of her Jewish husband.

The essay became the subject of extensive commentary after The Atlantic published its archive on the Internet in 2008, leading to the article's rediscovery and going viral. The commentary focused on the topics of white privilege and the prejudices in America at the time, and pointed out her naïveté and the fact that "the author, a liberal-minded young woman, manages nonetheless to be spectacularly wrong about just about everything." Jonathan Chait wrote that "she tries to take a balanced, blame-both-sides-equally approach to the anti-Semitism issue" and called her "the world's first recorded Shiksplainer," a portmanteau of two disparaging terms: the Yiddish shiksa, meaning a non-Jewish woman or girl, and mansplainer. Olga Khazan wrote that the "tone-deaf" article serves as a cautionary tale against Islamophobia today, and noted that it "echoes current conversations about European Muslim identity."

The article was originally published anonymously, but her name was published in the Catalog of Copyright Entries. According to the article, Lewis was around 29 years old when it was published in 1939.

== See also ==
- My Daughter Married a Negro
