= Arbiter =

An arbiter or arbitrator is a person who settles a dispute or makes a final decision when others disagree. arbitration.

Arbiter may also refer to:

- Discussion moderator
- Arbiter (chess), who oversees matches in tournaments

== Arts and entertainment ==
=== Music ===
- The Arbiter, a character from the musical Chess
- Arbiter (album), by Hopesfall, 2018

=== Fiction ===
- The Arbiter, a character in the musical Chess
- Arbiter (Halo), a character class in the Halo video game series
- Arbiter-class starships, Protoss support vessels in the StarCraft science-fiction series
- Arbiter class starships, Starfleet battlecruiser in the Star Trek Online MMORPG
- Arbiter, a demonic battleaxe used by Dante in the video game DmC: Devil May Cry
- Arbiters, characters in the Japanese anime series Death Parade
- Arbiter, a section of the Government and the Legal enforcers in the Korean game Lobotomy Corporation
- The Arbiter, a mentor character in Raid: Shadow Legends

== Technology ==
- Arbiter (electronics), a component in electronic circuitry that allocates scarce resources
  - Memory arbiter, a component that allocates memory
    - Wavefront arbiter, a commercial memory arbiter optimized for high-speed operation

== Other ==
- ArbiterSports, a sports officiating software company owned by the NCAA
- HMS Arbiter (D31), an escort aircraft carrier in the Royal Navy of the United Kingdom
- Dickie Arbiter (born 1940), British television and radio commentator
- Ivor Arbiter (1929–2005), English drum designer, manufacturer, instrument salesman, and entrepreneur
- Petronius (27–66), Roman author and satirist known formally as Gaius Petronius Arbiter
- One of the names of the Hindu deity Hanuman
- Arbiter, the title of the leader of Jinsy Island in British comedy series This is Jinsy
- Pagyda arbiter, a moth in the family Crambidae
