= Pagyda schaliphora =

Scientific classification
- Kingdom: Animalia
- Phylum: Arthropoda
- Class: Insecta
- Order: Lepidoptera
- Family: Crambidae
- Genus: Pagyda
- Species: P. schaliphora

Binomial name
- Pagyda schaliphora Hampson, 1899

Species of moth

Pagyda schaliphora is a moth in the family Crambidae. It was described by George Hampson in 1899. It is found in Australia, where it has been recorded from Queensland.

The wingspan is about 22 mm. There is a slightly curved orange antemedial line on the forewings. Both wings have a fine orange marginal line.
