= Pagyda quinquelineata =

Scientific classification
- Kingdom: Animalia
- Phylum: Arthropoda
- Class: Insecta
- Order: Lepidoptera
- Family: Crambidae
- Genus: Pagyda
- Species: P. quinquelineata

Binomial name
- Pagyda quinquelineata Hering, 1903

Species of moth

Pagyda quinquelineata is a moth in the family Crambidae. P. quinquelineata was described by Hering in 1903. It is found in Japan, Taiwan and China. The wingspan is 19-26 mm.
