= Hebraism =

Term often applied to Jews or the Jewish faith, national ideology or culture

Hebraism is a lexical item, usage or trait characteristic of the Hebrew language. Hebrew has many idiomatic terms which are not easily translatable to other languages. By successive extension it is often applied to the Jewish people, their faith, national ideology or culture.

== Examples ==
Idiomatic Hebrew terms which are not easily translatable include בארבע עיניים be'arba enayim, literally "with four eyes", meaning face to face without the presence of a third person, as in "The two men met with four eyes." The expression לא דובים ולא יער lo dubim ve lo ya'ar is literally "neither bears nor forest", but means that something is completely false. The saying טמן את ידו בצלחת taman et yado batsalakhat "buried his hand in the dish" means that someone idles away their time. Nothing "from good to bad", in the Book of Genesis, means "neither good nor bad".

== Other uses of "Hebraism" ==
=== Etymology ===
"Hebraism" may also refer to a lexical item with Hebrew etymology, i.e. that (ultimately) derives from Hebrew. For example, the English word stiff-necked, meaning "stubborn", is a calque of Greek σκληροτράχηλος, which is a calque of Hebrew קשה עורף qeshēh ʿōref "hard of neck; stubborn". Similar calques are the way of women (דרך נשים) meaning "menstruation" and flowing with milk and honey (זבת חלב ודבש) "abundance".

Sometimes Hebraisms can be coined using non-Hebrew structure. For example, the Yiddish lexical item ישיבה בחור yeshive bokher, meaning "Yeshivah student", uses a Germanic structure but two Hebrew lexical items.

=== Distinctive language ===
Beyond simple etymology, both spoken and written Hebrew is marked by peculiar linguistic elements that distinguish its semitic roots. This hebraism includes word order, chiasmus, compound prepositions, and numerous other distinctive features.

=== Systematic Hebraisms ===
Finally, the word "hebraism" describes a quality, character, nature, or method of thought, or system of religion attributed to the Hebrew people. It is in this sense that Matthew Arnold (1869) contrasted Hebraism with Hellenism, identifying Thomas Carlyle as his age's embodiment of the former. Feldman's response to Arnold expands on this usage. Leo Strauss is also well-known for his metaphorical juxtaposition of Jerusalem and Athens in a similar light. Furthermore, Friedrich Nietzsche and Otto Weiniger thought in terms of similar dualities as well.

== See also ==
- Christian Hebraist
- Hebraist
- Muslim Hebraists
- List of English words of Hebrew origin
