= Pagyda perlustralis =

Scientific classification
- Domain: Eukaryota
- Kingdom: Animalia
- Phylum: Arthropoda
- Class: Insecta
- Order: Lepidoptera
- Family: Crambidae
- Genus: Pagyda
- Species: P. perlustralis

Binomial name
- Pagyda perlustralis Rebel, 1915

Species of moth

Pagyda perlustralis is a moth in the family Crambidae. It was described by Hans Rebel in 1915. It is found on Samoa.
