= Pagyda griseotincta =

Scientific classification
- Domain: Eukaryota
- Kingdom: Animalia
- Phylum: Arthropoda
- Class: Insecta
- Order: Lepidoptera
- Family: Crambidae
- Genus: Pagyda
- Species: P. griseotincta

Binomial name
- Pagyda griseotincta Caradja, 1939

Species of moth

Pagyda griseotincta is a moth in the family Crambidae. It was described by Aristide Caradja in 1939. It is found in Sichuan, China.
