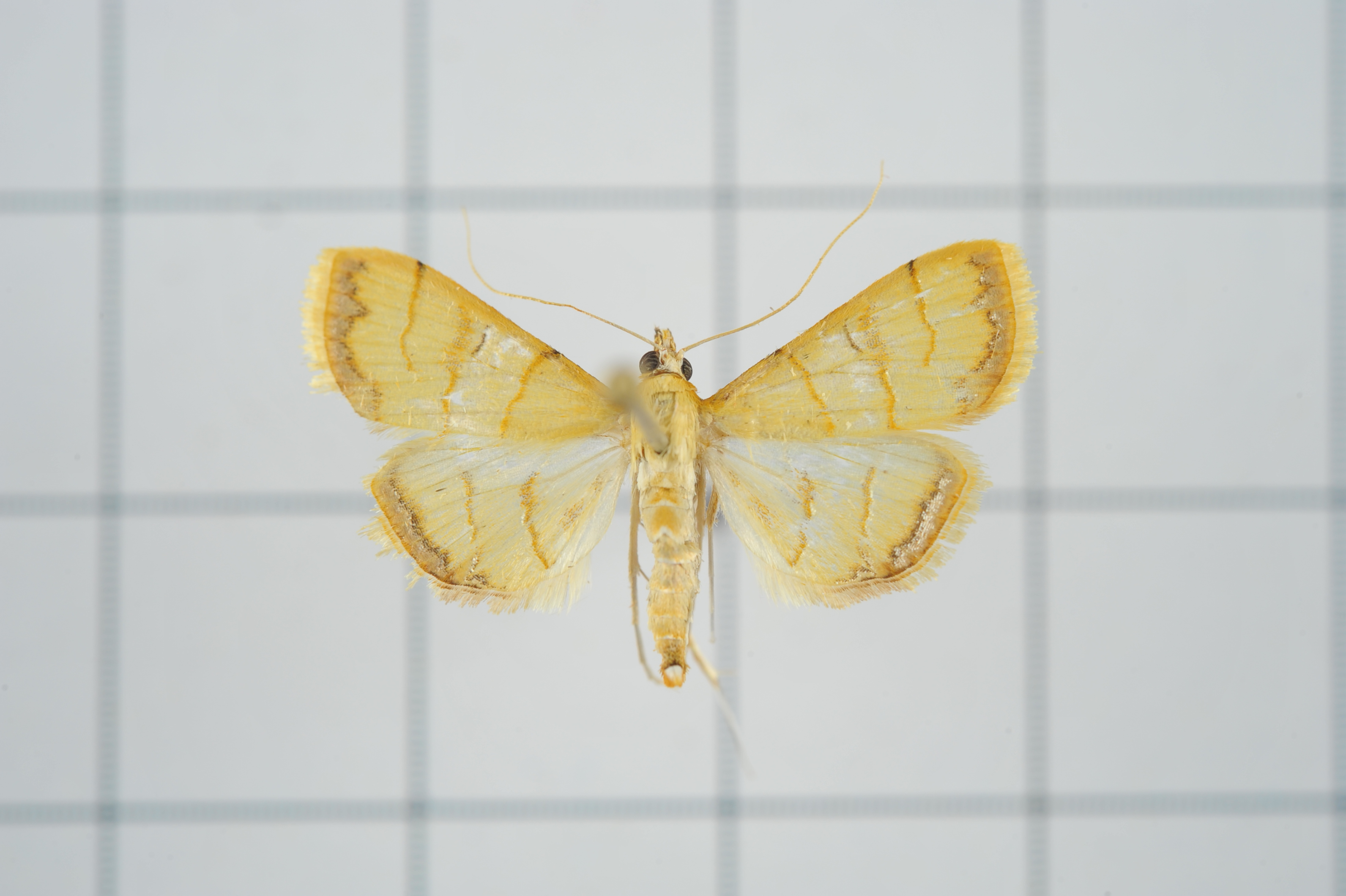

Scientific classification
- Kingdom: Animalia
- Phylum: Arthropoda
- Class: Insecta
- Order: Lepidoptera
- Family: Crambidae
- Genus: Pagyda
- Species: P. lustralis

Binomial name
- Pagyda lustralis Snellen, 1890

= Pagyda lustralis =

Species of moth

Pagyda lustralis is a moth in the family Crambidae. It was described by Snellen in 1890. It is found in India (Sikkim) and Burma.
