= Pagyda pulvereiumbralis =

Scientific classification
- Kingdom: Animalia
- Phylum: Arthropoda
- Class: Insecta
- Order: Lepidoptera
- Family: Crambidae
- Genus: Pagyda
- Species: P. pulvereiumbralis

Binomial name
- Pagyda pulvereiumbralis (Hampson, 1918)

Synonyms
- Pyrausta pulvereiumbralis Hampson, 1918; Pagyda trivirgalis de Joannis, 1932; Pagyda trivirginalis; Pagyda hargreavesi Tams, 1941

Species of moth

Pagyda pulvereiumbralis is a moth in the family Crambidae. It was described by George Hampson in 1918. It is found in Ethiopia, Kenya, Namibia, Uganda, and on Réunion, Madagascar and Mauritius.
