= Pagyda citrinella =

Scientific classification
- Kingdom: Animalia
- Phylum: Arthropoda
- Class: Insecta
- Order: Lepidoptera
- Family: Crambidae
- Genus: Pagyda
- Species: P. citrinella

Binomial name
- Pagyda citrinella Inoue, 1996

Species of moth

Pagyda citrinella is a moth in the family Crambidae. It was described by Hiroshi Inoue in 1996. It is found in Japan, where it has been recorded from the Ogasawara islands.
