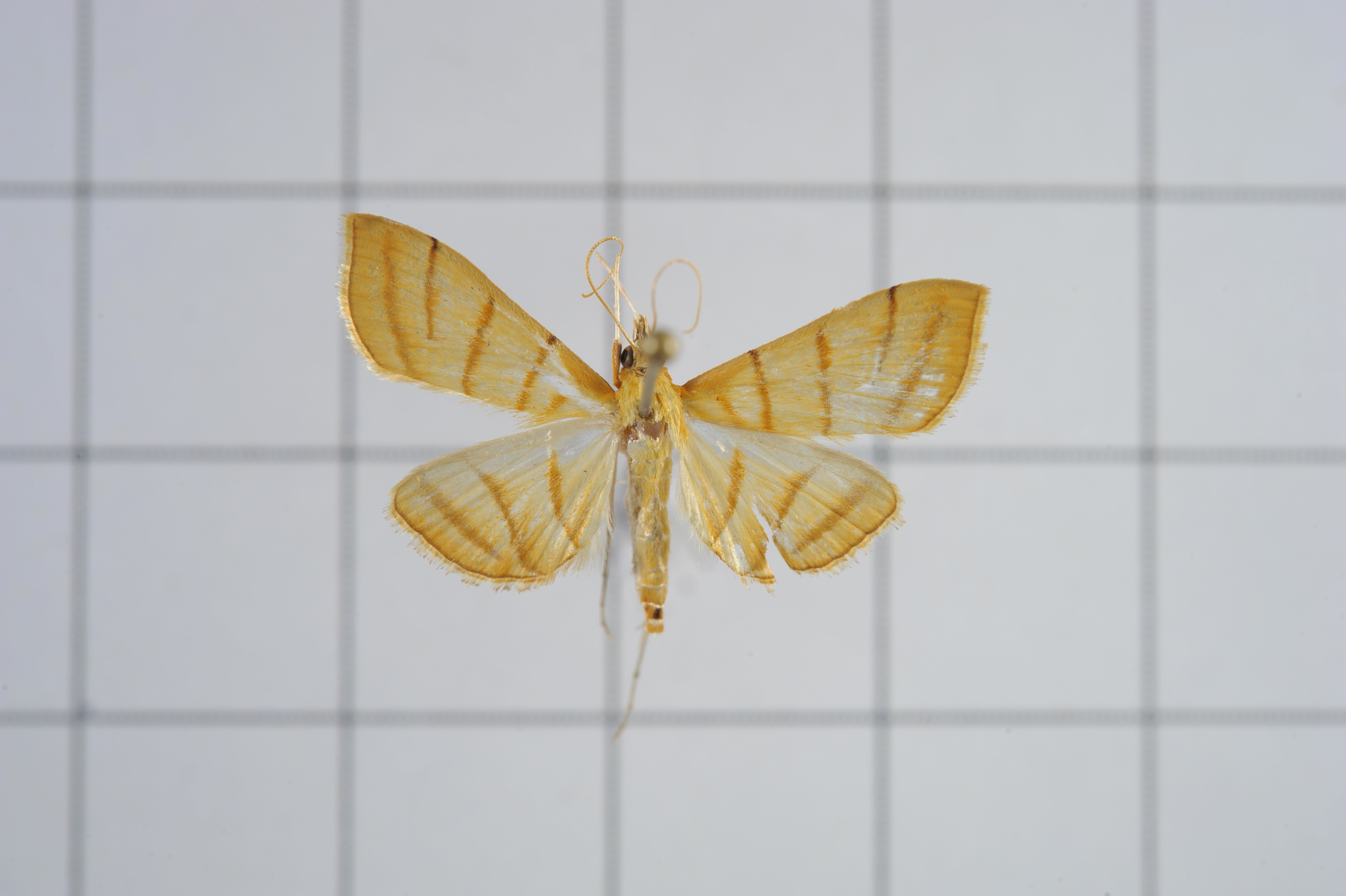

Scientific classification
- Domain: Eukaryota
- Kingdom: Animalia
- Phylum: Arthropoda
- Class: Insecta
- Order: Lepidoptera
- Family: Crambidae
- Genus: Pagyda
- Species: P. quadrilineata

Binomial name
- Pagyda quadrilineata Butler, 1881

= Pagyda quadrilineata =

Species of moth

Pagyda quadrilineata is a moth in the family Crambidae. It was described by Arthur Gardiner Butler in 1881. It is found in Japan and Taiwan.
