= Pagyda argyritis =

Scientific classification
- Kingdom: Animalia
- Phylum: Arthropoda
- Class: Insecta
- Order: Lepidoptera
- Family: Crambidae
- Genus: Pagyda
- Species: P. argyritis

Binomial name
- Pagyda argyritis Hampson, 1899

Species of moth

Pagyda argyritis is a moth in the family Crambidae. It was described by George Hampson in 1899. It is found in Sikkim, India.
