= Pagyda pullalis =

Scientific classification
- Domain: Eukaryota
- Kingdom: Animalia
- Phylum: Arthropoda
- Class: Insecta
- Order: Lepidoptera
- Family: Crambidae
- Genus: Pagyda
- Species: P. pullalis

Binomial name
- Pagyda pullalis Swinhoe, 1903

Species of moth

Pagyda pullalis is a moth in the family Crambidae. It was described by Charles Swinhoe in 1903. It is found in Thailand.
