= Pagyda amphisalis =

Scientific classification
- Kingdom: Animalia
- Phylum: Arthropoda
- Class: Insecta
- Order: Lepidoptera
- Family: Crambidae
- Genus: Pagyda
- Species: P. amphisalis

Binomial name
- Pagyda amphisalis (Walker, 1859)

Synonyms
- Botys amphisalis Walker, 1859

Species of moth

Pagyda amphisalis is a moth in the family Crambidae. It was described by Francis Walker in 1859. It is found in China.
