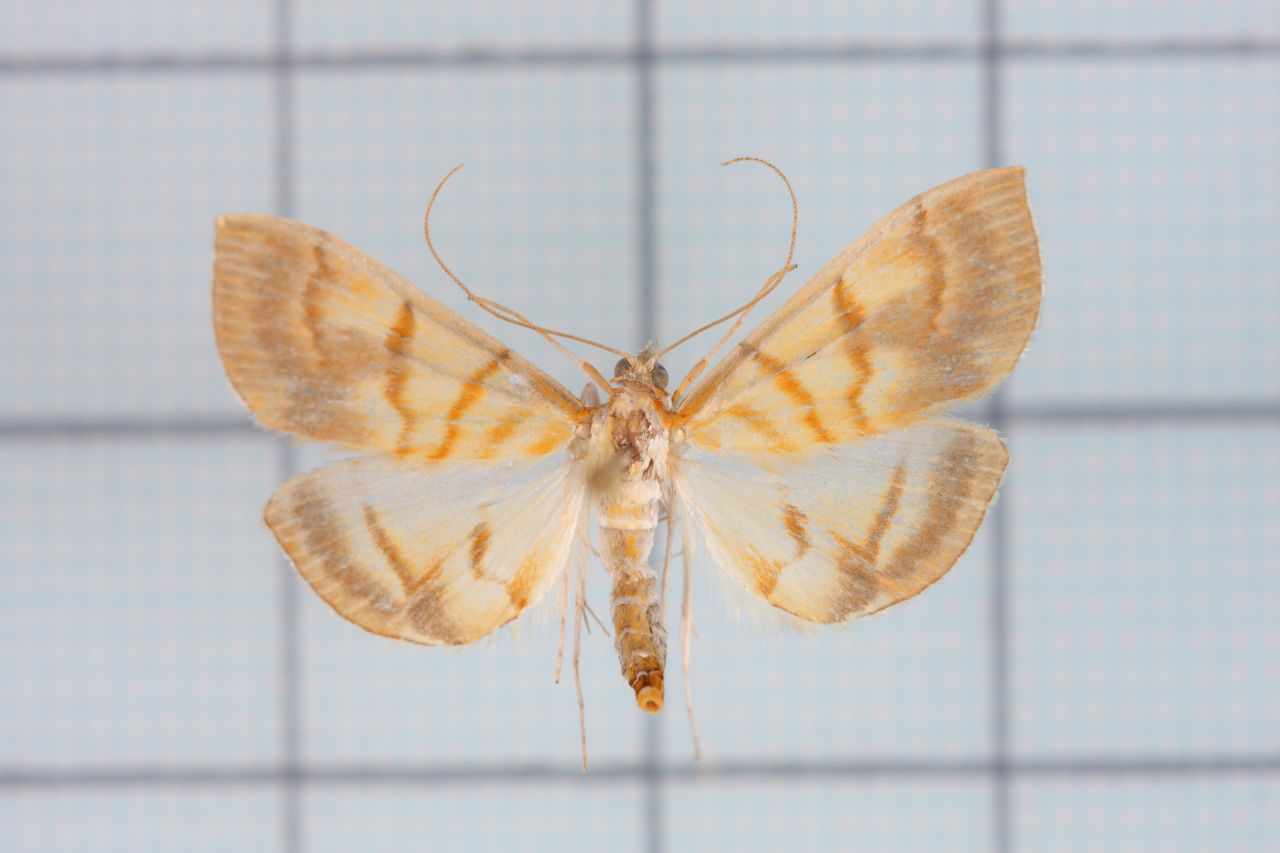
- Pagyda nebulosa

Scientific classification
- Domain: Eukaryota
- Kingdom: Animalia
- Phylum: Arthropoda
- Class: Insecta
- Order: Lepidoptera
- Family: Crambidae
- Subfamily: Pyraustinae
- Genus: Pagyda; Walker, 1859

= Pagyda =

Genus of moths

Pagyda is a genus of moths of the family Crambidae.

== Species ==
- Pagyda amphisalis (Walker, 1859)
- Pagyda arbiter (Butler, 1879)
- Pagyda argyritis Hampson, 1899
- Pagyda atriplagiata Hampson, 1917
- Pagyda botydalis (Snellen, [1880])
- Pagyda calida Hampson, 1898
- Pagyda citrinella Inoue, 1996
- Pagyda discolor Swinhoe, 1894
- Pagyda fumosa Kenrick, 1912
- Pagyda griseotincta Caradja, 1939
- Pagyda hargreavesi Tams, 1941
- Pagyda lustralis Snellen, 1890
- Pagyda nebulosa Wileman & South, 1917
- Pagyda ochrealis Wileman, 1911
- Pagyda orthocrates Meyrick, 1938
- Pagyda perlustralis Rebel, 1915
- Pagyda poeasalis (Walker, 1859)
- Pagyda pullalis Swinhoe, 1903
- Pagyda pulvereiumbralis (Hampson, 1918)
- Pagyda quadrilineata Butler, 1881
- Pagyda quinquelineata Hering, 1903
- Pagyda rubricatalis Swinhoe, 1890
- Pagyda salvalis Walker, 1859
- Pagyda schaliphora Hampson, 1899
- Pagyda sounanalis Legrand, 1966

== Former species ==
- Pagyda trivirgalis de Joannis, 1932
