= My Daughter Married a Negro =

Magazine essay

- Author: Anonymous
- Language: English
- Genre: Autobiography
- Published in: Harper's Magazine
- Publication date: July 1951
- Media type: Print

"My Daughter Married a Negro" is an essay by an anonymous male author published in Harper's Magazine in the July 1951 issue. It discussed the author's daughter Anne's marriage to an African American – referred to as a negro in the parlance of the time – college classmate in 1949, and details "his family's ordeal with their daughter marrying across the color line." The article has since been much discussed in scholarship on racial relations in the United States.

Told by the father, the article "described the escalating tension in a prototypical family faced with the possibility of an interracial marriage" and the parents' shock when they were told about their daughter's intention to marry a black man.

== See also ==
- "I Married a Jew"
