= Maudlin =

Maudlin may refer to:

== People ==
- Daniel Maudlin, British historian
- Tim Maudlin (born 1968), American philosopher of science
- Wright Maudlin (1797–1866), American abolitionist and Underground Railroad conductor

== Places ==
- Maudlin, Cornwall
- Maudlin, West Sussex
- Maudlin Castle, Kilkenny, Ireland
- Maudlin's Cemetery, Naas, Ireland
- Maudlin, South Carolina

== Other uses ==
- Magdalene College, Cambridge
- Magdalen College, Oxford

== See also ==
- Magdalene (disambiguation)
- Maudling (disambiguation)
