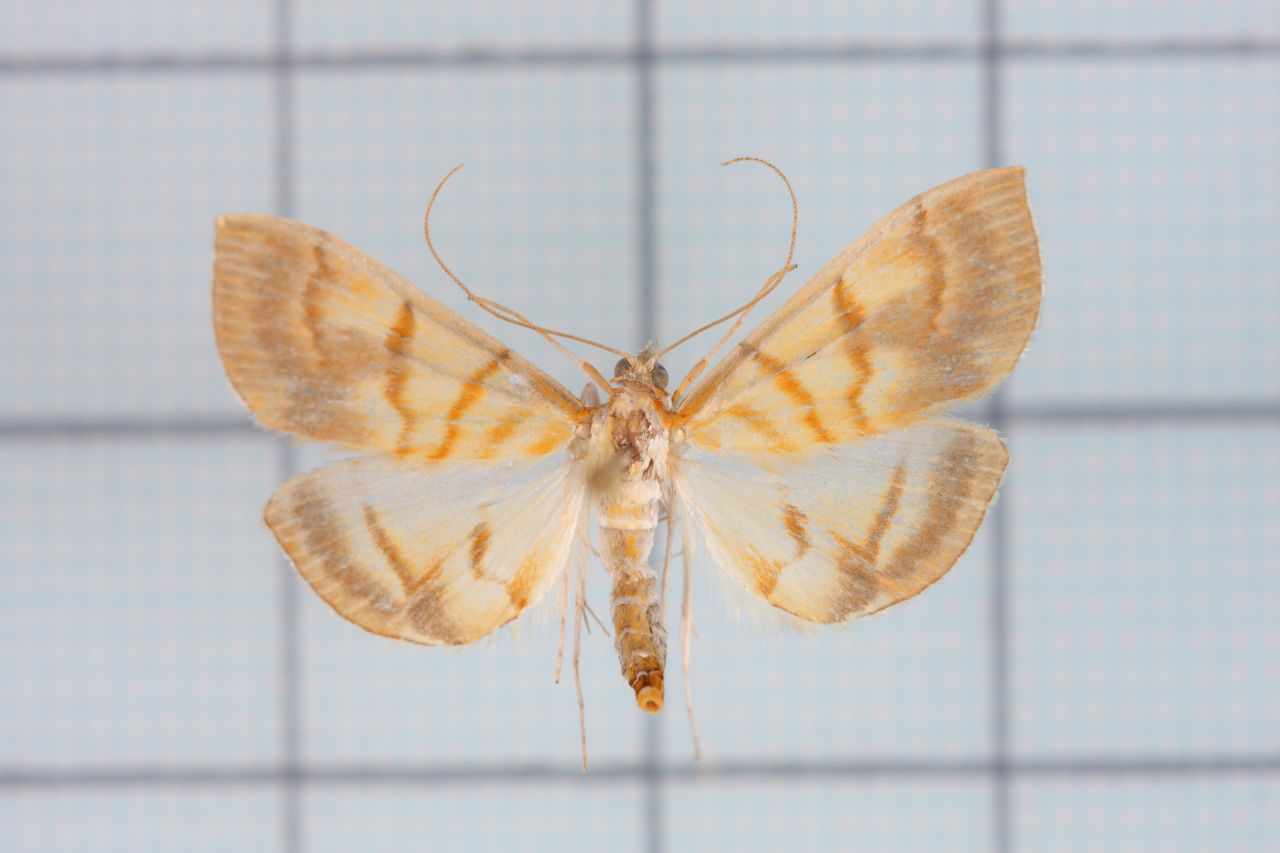

Scientific classification
- Domain: Eukaryota
- Kingdom: Animalia
- Phylum: Arthropoda
- Class: Insecta
- Order: Lepidoptera
- Family: Crambidae
- Genus: Pagyda
- Species: P. nebulosa

Binomial name
- Pagyda nebulosa Wileman & South, 1917

= Pagyda nebulosa =

Species of moth

Pagyda nebulosa is a moth of the family Crambidae described by Wileman and South in 1917. It is found in Taiwan.
