= Pagyda sounanalis =

Scientific classification
- Domain: Eukaryota
- Kingdom: Animalia
- Phylum: Arthropoda
- Class: Insecta
- Order: Lepidoptera
- Family: Crambidae
- Genus: Pagyda
- Species: P. sounanalis

Binomial name
- Pagyda sounanalis Legrand, 1966

Species of moth

Pagyda sounanalis is a moth in the family Crambidae. It was described by Henry Legrand in 1966. It is found on the Seychelles, where it has been recorded from Aldabra, Cosmoledo and Menai.
