= Pagyda calida =

Scientific classification
- Kingdom: Animalia
- Phylum: Arthropoda
- Class: Insecta
- Order: Lepidoptera
- Family: Crambidae
- Genus: Pagyda
- Species: P. calida

Binomial name
- Pagyda calida Hampson, 1898

Species of moth

Pagyda calida is a moth in the family Crambidae. It was described by George Hampson in 1898. It is found on Peninsular Malaysia and Borneo.

The wingspan is about 24 mm. Adults are deep brownish orange.
