= Maudling =

Maudling is a surname. Notable people with the surname include:

- Jonny Maudling, English composer, keyboard player, and drummer
- Reginald Maudling (1917–1979), British Conservative Party politician

== See also ==
- Maudlin (disambiguation)
