= Dave Yeast =

American baseball administrator and umpire

Dave Yeast (born 1959) is an American baseball and football officiating administrator and former baseball umpire from 1981 to 2015. Between 1996 and 2008 Yeast was the National Coordinator of Baseball Umpires for the NCAA. In 1999 he was named Umpire of the Year by the International Baseball Federation.

== Early life ==
Davis Dixon Yeast was born in 1959. He attended umpiring school in 1981. Early in his career he was involved with the National Umpire Improvement Program.

== Career ==
Yeast served as the conference umpire coordinator for the Missouri Valley Conference from 1990 to 1994, the Metro Conference from 1993 to 1995, and Conference USA from 1996 to 1999. He umpired 25 Division I conference tournaments and 14 NCAA Regionals. He was an umpire during the NCAA College World Series in 1991 and 1995, and was involved with the NCAA baseball committee as it structured the officiating program for the NCAA playoff and World Series tournaments. In 2021, Yeast was the first ever umpire inducted into the College Baseball Hall of Fame.

Internationally, Yeast worked as an umpire for the 1996 Olympic Games, the 1993 and 1999 Intercontinental Cups, and the 1990 World Championships. In 1995 he also worked as an umpire for Major League Baseball.

From 1996 to 2008 Yeast served as the National Coordinator of Baseball Umpires for the NCAA. During his term as National Coordinator, Yeast developed the NCAA’s first rules testing program for sports officials, implemented the NCAA Umpires Mechanics Manual and NCAA Baseball Umpire Preseason Guide, and cofounded the NCAA Umpire Development Camps. He resigned from the NCAA position in order to return to umpiring on the field, where Yeast continued until 2015. Since 2015, he has served as Coordinator of Baseball Officiating for the Pac-12 and the Big West and Western Athletic Conferences. In 2024, Yeast became the Assistant Coordinator of Umpires for the SEC Umpire Consortium that includes the SEC, Sun Belt, Southland, Southern and Ohio Valley and Atlantic Sun Conferences.

He worked as an Instant Replay Communicator for the NFL from 2008 thru 2015, and as an Instant Replay Official for the Pac-12 Conference from 2017-present. He was selected to work the 2018 Tax Slayer Gator Bowl. In 2022, Yeast was named Supervisor of Football Instant Replay Officials for the Pac-12 Conference. Yeast was selected to work as the Colloborative Replay Official for the 2021 CFP Semi-Final (Michigan vs Alabama) and National Championship Game (Georgia vs Alabama) and the CFP Semi-Final Game (Michigan vs TCU) in 2022. In 2025, Yeast was hired by the NFL to serve as their Instant Replay Trainer.

He served as the vice president of officiating education for ArbiterSports from 2009 until 2020.
