= Pagyda orthocrates =

Scientific classification
- Kingdom: Animalia
- Phylum: Arthropoda
- Class: Insecta
- Order: Lepidoptera
- Family: Crambidae
- Genus: Pagyda
- Species: P. orthocrates

Binomial name
- Pagyda orthocrates Meyrick, 1938

Species of moth

Pagyda orthocrates is a moth in the family Crambidae. It was described by Edward Meyrick in 1938. It is found on Java in Indonesia.
