= Pagyda poeasalis =

Scientific classification
- Kingdom: Animalia
- Phylum: Arthropoda
- Class: Insecta
- Order: Lepidoptera
- Family: Crambidae
- Genus: Pagyda
- Species: P. poeasalis

Binomial name
- Pagyda poeasalis (Walker, 1859)

Synonyms
- Botys poeasalis Walker, 1859

Species of moth

Pagyda poeasalis is a moth in the family Crambidae. It was described by Francis Walker in 1859. It is found on Borneo.
