= Pagyda fumosa =

Scientific classification
- Domain: Eukaryota
- Kingdom: Animalia
- Phylum: Arthropoda
- Class: Insecta
- Order: Lepidoptera
- Family: Crambidae
- Genus: Pagyda
- Species: P. fumosa

Binomial name
- Pagyda fumosa Kenrick, 1912

Species of moth

Pagyda fumosa is a moth in the family Crambidae. It was described by George Hamilton Kenrick in 1912. It is found on New Guinea.
