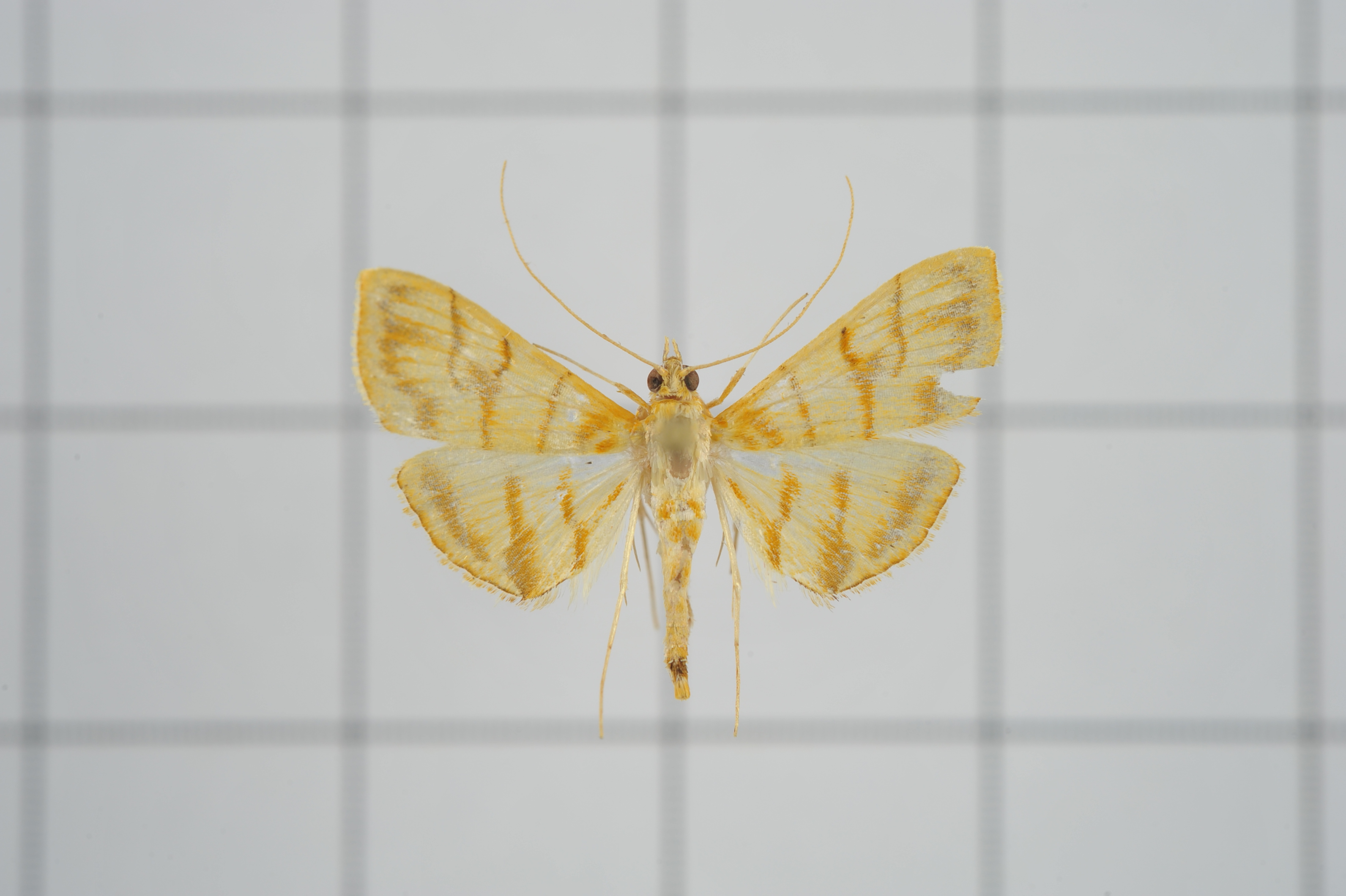

Scientific classification
- Kingdom: Animalia
- Phylum: Arthropoda
- Class: Insecta
- Order: Lepidoptera
- Family: Crambidae
- Genus: Pagyda
- Species: P. botydalis

Binomial name
- Pagyda botydalis (Snellen, [1880])

Synonyms
- Glyphodes botydalis Snellen, 1880; Pagyda aurantialis Hampson, 1893

= Pagyda botydalis =

Species of moth

Pagyda botydalis is a moth in the family Crambidae. It was described by Snellen in 1880. It is found on Sumatra, in north-eastern India, Sri Lanka, Taiwan, Papua New Guinea and Australia, where it has been recorded from Queensland.

Adults have yellow wings with orange lines.
