= Pagyda rubricatalis =

Scientific classification
- Kingdom: Animalia
- Phylum: Arthropoda
- Clade: Pancrustacea
- Class: Insecta
- Order: Lepidoptera
- Family: Crambidae
- Genus: Pagyda
- Species: P. rubricatalis

Binomial name
- Pagyda rubricatalis Swinhoe, 1890

Species of moth

Pagyda rubricatalis is a moth in the family Crambidae. It was described by Charles Swinhoe in 1890. It is found in Myanmar.
