= Pagyda discolor =

Scientific classification
- Domain: Eukaryota
- Kingdom: Animalia
- Phylum: Arthropoda
- Class: Insecta
- Order: Lepidoptera
- Family: Crambidae
- Genus: Pagyda
- Species: P. discolor

Binomial name
- Pagyda discolor Swinhoe, 1894

Species of moth

Pagyda discolor is a moth in the family Crambidae. It was described by Charles Swinhoe in 1894. It is found in India (Assam) and Burma.
