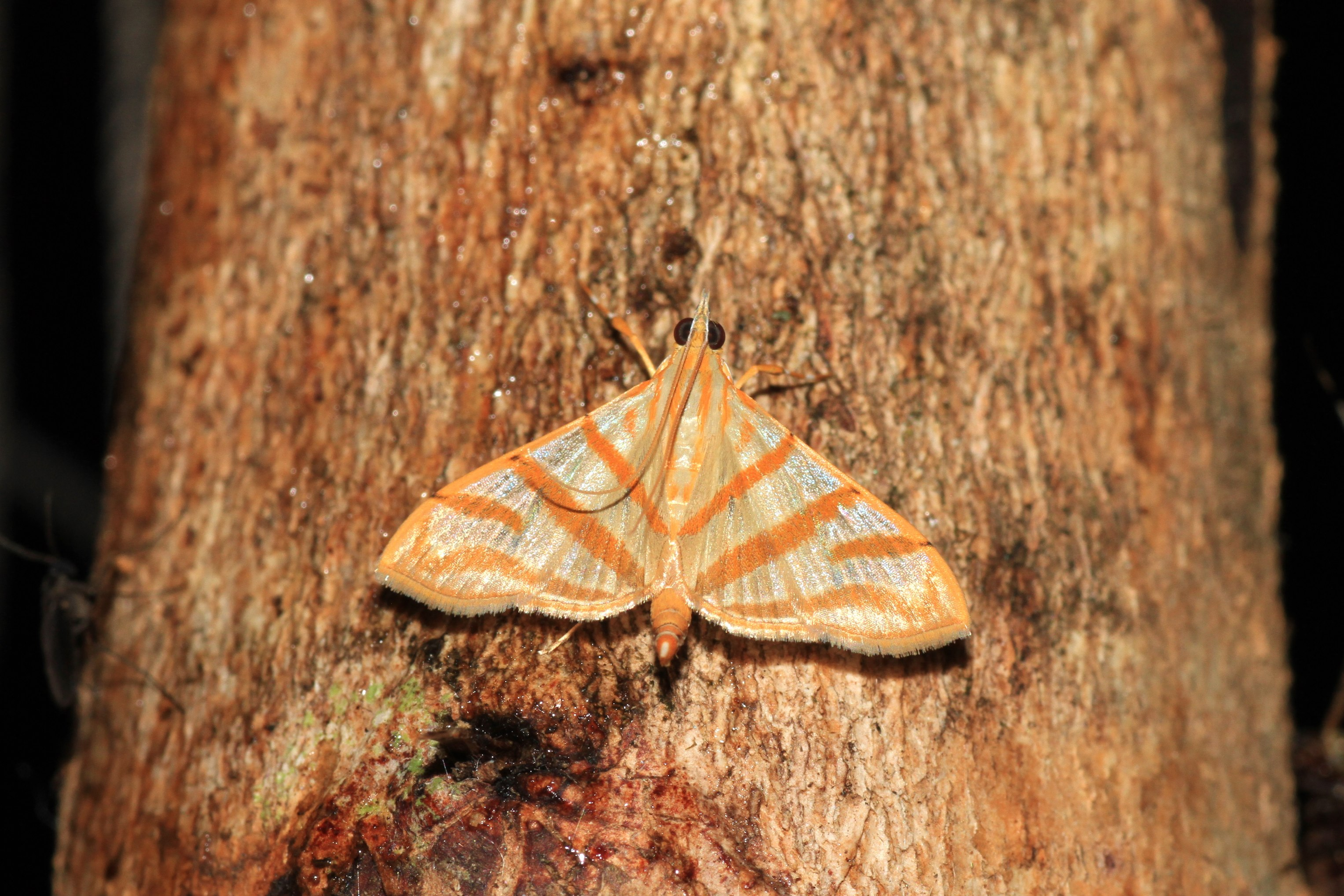

Scientific classification
- Kingdom: Animalia
- Phylum: Arthropoda
- Class: Insecta
- Order: Lepidoptera
- Family: Crambidae
- Genus: Pagyda
- Species: P. salvalis

Binomial name
- Pagyda salvalis Walker, 1859

= Pagyda salvalis =

Species of moth

Pagyda salvalis is a moth in the family Crambidae. It was described by Francis Walker in 1859. It is found in South Africa, Zimbabwe and Sri Lanka.
