= Pagyda ochrealis =

Scientific classification
- Domain: Eukaryota
- Kingdom: Animalia
- Phylum: Arthropoda
- Class: Insecta
- Order: Lepidoptera
- Family: Crambidae
- Genus: Pagyda
- Species: P. ochrealis

Binomial name
- Pagyda ochrealis Wileman, 1911

Species of moth

Pagyda ochrealis is a moth in the family Crambidae. It was described by Wileman in 1911. It is found in Japan.
