= Pagyda arbiter =

Scientific classification
- Kingdom: Animalia
- Phylum: Arthropoda
- Class: Insecta
- Order: Lepidoptera
- Family: Crambidae
- Genus: Pagyda
- Species: P. arbiter

Binomial name
- Pagyda arbiter (Butler, 1879)

Synonyms
- Botys arbiter Butler, 1879

Species of moth

Pagyda arbiter is a moth in the family Crambidae. It was described by Arthur Gardiner Butler in 1879. It is found on Borneo, China and Japan.

The wingspan is 16–25 mm.
