= ArbiterSports =

American sports software company

Arbiter
- Founded: Salt Lake City, Utah April 8, 1984 (Advanced Business Technology); 1984 (The Arbiter) 2009 (ArbiterSports)
- Type: Private
- Legal status: LLC
- Headquarters: Sandy, Utah
- Region served: Global
- CEO: Kyle Ford
- Website: http://arbiter.io

Arbiter (formerly ArbiterSports) is an American software company that develops and provides digital tools for K–12 athletics and activities management. The company serves schools, districts, state athletic associations, governing bodies, leagues, conferences, assignors, and officials across the United States. Arbiter’s products include registration, payments, scheduling, facilities management, eligibility tracking, officiating assignments, and athletic websites, along with Arbiter 360, a compliance and oversight platform used by state associations. Originally focused on officiating management software, the company expanded through product development and acquisitions to support a broader range of K–12 operational needs. The company is based in Sandy, Utah.

In 2020, Arbiter acquired FamilyID, and in 2025 it acquired rSchoolToday and BigTeams, expanding its capabilities in registration, scheduling, facilities coordination, and community engagement for K–12 schools and districts. In 2025, the company rebranded from ArbiterSports to Arbiter to reflect its expanded role beyond officiating technology.

== History ==
=== Founding ===
The Arbiter assigning system was created in 1984 by Advanced Business Technology, at the request of the Utah High School Activities Association, who hired ABT to build a computerized method of assigning sports officials to matches and managing their assignments. Known as TheArbiter, the software was originally released on the MS-DOS platform, then for Microsoft Windows in 1997. Arbiter was released as a web application in 2003, known as TheArbiter.NET. Dave Yeast, former National Coordinator of Baseball Umpires for the NCAA, has served as the firm's vice president of officiating education.

=== 2008: Acquisition by the NCAA ===
Arbiter was acquired by the NCAA in September 2008. The NCAA said their purpose in the acquisition, along with their acquisition of eOfficials LLC the same month, was to improve the quality and consistency of officiating at all levels of play.

=== 2020 Family ID Acquisition ===
In February 2020, ArbiterSports acquired the online registration platform FamilyID, extending its product suite into student registration and program management for schools and community organizations.

=== 2020 data breach ===
Arbiter experienced a data breach in 2020 and was charged with a class action lawsuit. The court did not favor any decisions and a settlement was reached upon by all the parties involved in 2021.

== 2021-Present ==
=== 2025 Changes from ArbiterSports to Arbiter ===
The company rebranded from ArbiterSports to Arbiter, reflecting its broader mission to serve all aspects of K–12 operations and unifying its product suite under a single brand identity.

=== 2025 NFHS Partnership Announcement ===
In June 2025, the National Federation of State High School Associations named Arbiter its “official and exclusive event, game and team scheduling partner” under a multi-year agreement.

=== Ownership and acquisitions ===
Arbiter is a privately held company headquartered in Sandy, Utah. It operates under Intermountain Sports Group and, in 2025, received a majority investment from the private equity firm Accel-KKR, which specializes in software and technology companies. Since 2017, when it was acquired by Serent Capital from the NCAA, Arbiter has expanded through a series of strategic acquisitions in the education-technology sector

Major acquisitions include: FamilyID (2020) – online registration and activity-management platform for schools and district programs. rSchoolToday (2025) – expanded the company’s scheduling, facilities-management, and website capabilities for K–12 schools and districts. BigTeams (2025) – added school-athletics website and community-engagement tools to Arbiter’s product suite.

These acquisitions have been integrated into Arbiter’s platform to broaden its coverage across athletics, activities, and district operations within the K–12 sector.

Arbiter maintains partnerships with state athletic associations and school districts throughout the United States, providing technology to improve transparency, compliance, and administrative efficiency in extracurricular program management.

== Products and services ==
Arbiter provides a suite of cloud-based software tools for K–12 schools, districts, and state athletic associations. Its products are designed to support registration, scheduling, payments, facility management, communication, and compliance tracking within a unified platform.Product information is based on publicly available materials published by the company.

• Arbiter Assigning – Enables officials and assignors to manage officiating assignments, availability, communication, and payment reconciliation through a shared interface.

• Arbiter Facilities – Manages scheduling and rental workflows for school and community facilities, including reservation requests, approval processes, and invoicing.

• Arbiter Game – Provides centralized scheduling and coordination for athletic events, practices, and competitions. The software includes tools for conflict detection, roster generation, and multi-school visibility.

• Arbiter Pay – Facilitates secure, automated payments to officials, event workers, and participants. The platform supports electronic disbursement, audit tracking, and financial reporting.

• Arbiter Registration – Used by schools and districts to manage student registration, eligibility records, fees, attendance, and compliance documentation. The system includes integrated SMS and email communication features for administrators, coaches, and families.

• Arbiter Websites – Provides website templates for athletic departments and districts, integrating schedules, rosters, and announcements within a single platform.

• Arbiter 360 – A compliance and oversight platform for state athletic associations, used to manage eligibility, participation records, student transfers, and Title IX reporting across member schools.

• Quick Connect – A communication service that enables traceable, one-way messaging between administrators, coaches, and families, designed to meet state transparency and communication mandates.

The platform integrates with common student information systems (SIS), financial software, and single sign-on (SSO) tools, providing district and state-level visibility and consistency across schools.

== Market and reach ==
Arbiter’s software is used by K–12 schools, districts, and state athletic associations across the United States. Its platform supports athletic directors, administrators, assignors, and officials in managing athletic and extracurricular events, maintaining compliance, and overseeing payment workflows

Through partnerships with state and regional athletic associations, the company’s tools are utilized by schools serving millions of students and families nationwide. The Arbiter Pay platform processes a substantial volume of annual payments for officials, staff, and participants, supporting transparent and auditable financial transactions.

The platform integrates with state-level compliance systems and student information systems (SIS), allowing districts and associations to coordinate athletic, financial, and compliance data across multiple schools.
