= Daniel Maudlin =

Daniel Maudlin, FSA Scot, is a historian and academic. Since 2012, he has been Professor of History at the University of Plymouth.

== Career ==
Maudlin graduated from the University of St Andrews in 1996 with a first-class Master of Arts degree in art history and landscape archaeology. He then worked at the Peggy Guggenheim Collection in Venice and the Victoria and Albert Museum in London, before returning to St Andrews in 1998 to complete a doctorate supported by the British Academy; his PhD was awarded in 2002 for his thesis "Highland planned villages: the architecture of the British Fisheries Society". As well as working as an inspector for Historic Scotland, he was appointed to a Leverhulme postdoctoral research fellowship at Dalhousie University, before joining the University of Plymouth in 2005 as a lecturer. He was promoted firstly to a senior lectureship (in 2008) and then to a professorship (in 2012) at Plymouth. He has also held a research fellowship with the Arts and Humanities Research Council in 2010–11 and a three-year major research fellowship with the Leverhulme Trust beginning in 2015.

Maudlin's research focuses on Atlantic History and the relationship between built space and everyday life. He was elected a Fellow of Society of Antiquaries of Scotland in 2003, and his book The Highland House Transformed was named among The Scotsman's books of the year in 2009.

== Publications ==
- The Highland House Transformed: Architecture and Identity on the Edge of Britain 1700–1850 (Edinburgh University Press, 2009).
- (Co-edited with Marcel Vellinga) Consuming Architecture: On the Occupation, Appropriation and Interpretation of Buildings (Routledge, 2014).
- (Co-edited with Bernard L. Herman) Building the British Atlantic World: Spaces, Places and Material Culture 1600–1850 (University of North Carolina Press, 2016).
