= Sheigetz =

Disparaging term for a non-Jewish boy or young man

Sheigetz or shegetz (שייגעץ or in Hebrew שֵׁיְגֶּץ; alternative Romanizations incl. shaygetz, shaigetz, sheygets) with the alternative form shkotz (plural: sheygetses and shkotzim, respectively) is a Yiddish word that has entered English to refer to a non-Jewish boy or young man. It may also be used by an observant Jew when referring to a non-observant Jewish man. It is often used disparagingly, although it can also be used in appreciation by semantic reversal, similar to "rascal" becoming positive when used affectionately in regard to a teenager.

== Etymology ==
The word shegetz, like its feminine counterpart shiksa, according to the Oxford English Dictionary, is derived from sheqeṣ ("a detested thing").

== Alternative forms ==
In former times, it was common practice for Ashkenazi Jews who were harassed by youths to label their tormentors shkotzim. Nacham Grossbard of Haifa, writing in the Memorial Book for the Community of Ciechanów (1962), recounted these memories of his early years in Poland: "At the finish of the match, as soon as the whistle blows, we Jewish boys run as fast as we can, out of breath, all the way home in order not to have stones thrown at us or be hit by the shkotzim (non-Jewish boys)."

According to blogger Philologos (Hillel Halkin), the form shkotz was less used in Europe; he wrote that it is a back-formation that only occurred in America.

== See also ==
- Goy
- Stereotypes of Jews
- Shiksa
