= Shiksa =

Pejorative for a non-Jewish woman or girl

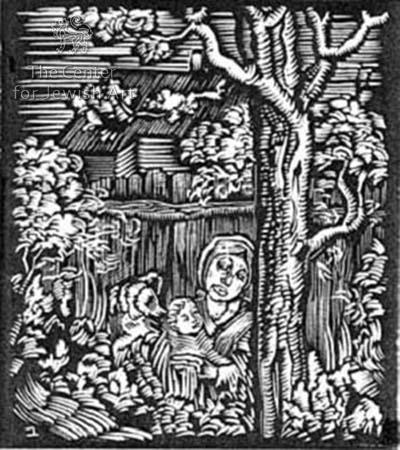
Josef Budko's woodcut depiction of the shiksa in Hayim Nahman Bialik's Behind the Fence

Shiksa (Yiddish: שיקסע, romanized: shikse) is an often disparaging term for a gentile woman or girl. The word, which is of Yiddish origin, has moved into English usage and some Hebrew usage (as well as Polish and German), mostly in North American Jewish culture.

Among Orthodox Jews, the term may be used to describe a Jewish girl or woman who fails to follow Orthodox religious precepts.

== Etymology ==
The etymology of the word shiksa is partly derived from the Hebrew term שקץ shekets, meaning "abomination", "impure," or "object of loathing", depending on the translator. According to the Oxford English Dictionary, it came into English usage in the late 19th century from the Yiddish shikse, which is an adaptation of the Hebrew word šiqṣâ, which is derived from sheqeṣ ("a detested thing") and the feminine suffix -â. A passage in which shekets (translated as "abomination") appeared in the Talmud to refer to people (rather than non-kosher actions) can be translated as:

Let him not marry the daughter of an unlearned and unobservant man, for they are an abomination and their wives a creeping thing.

Several dictionaries define shiksa as a disparaging and offensive term applied to a non-Jewish girl or woman.

The equivalent term for a non-Jewish male, used less frequently, is shegetz.

== North American and diaspora context ==
In North American and other diaspora Jewish communities, the use of "shiksa" reflects more social complexities than merely being an insult to non-Jewish women. A woman can only be a shiksa if she is perceived as such by Jewish people, usually Jewish men, making the term difficult to define; Menachem Kaiser in the Los Angeles Review of Books suggested there are two concepts of the shiksa, the forbidden seductress and the hag. Despite appearing in Yiddish literature for many decades, the term shiksa did not enter mainstream vernacular until the works of Philip Roth popularized it.

=== Severity ===
The term is typically considered pejorative. In 2009, in an unusual incident, it was recorded as a hate crime in Toronto. In 2014, Orthodox Union Rabbi Jack Abramowitz described it as "simply indefensible", "inherently condescending, racist and misogynistic".

The figure of the shiksa has also been viewed as an ideal, a representation of the American dream in Jewish assimilation, and as a sex symbol in popular culture, as the femme fatale in Roth and Woody Allen, even as such portrayals reinforce stereotypes of gentile women and Jewish men. Driven by the popularity of its use in Ben Stiller films, Seinfeld and Sex and the City, it has been reclaimed and used humorously or ironically, and in trend merchandising. Kaiser notes that the term is often now used self-referentially in an unserious way.

== Israel and Orthodox context ==
In Israel, where most women are Jewish, the word is sometimes used among the religious as a pejorative to refer to Jewish women who are not Orthodox or who demonstrate unseemly irreligious behavior. In other Orthodox communities, it can be used in the same way.

== Psychology ==
Freud and others have connected the shiksa taboo to an Oedipal complex.

== In popular culture ==
The shiksa has appeared as a character type in Yiddish literature. In Hayim Nahman Bialik's Behind the Fence, a young shiksa woman is impregnated by a Jewish man but abandoned for an appropriate Jewish virgin woman. Her grandmother can be considered a hag form of the shiksa. More dangerous shiksas in literature include Shmuel Yosef Agnon's "Lady and the Peddler", in which a shiksa plans to eat the Jewish man she is dating, and I. L. Peretz "Monish", which sees a Jewish man fall into a hell-like place for loving a blonde woman.

But the shikses, ah, the shikses are something else again [...] How do they get so gorgeous, so healthy, so blonde? My contempt for what they believe in is more than neutralized by my adoration of the way they look, the way they move and laugh and speak.

— Philip Roth, Portnoy's Complaint

As Jews populated American culture in the 20th century, more shiksa characters began to appear. Abie's Irish Rose focused on such a relationship, and the concept is mentioned in The Jazz Singer. Roth's books made the term mainstream, particularly Portnoy's Complaint in 1969. Roth placed the taboo nature of the shiksa in a cultural Jewish-American context, not a religious one. His work influenced that of Woody Allen, whose films depicted the concept. In American media, including Roth and Allen, the shiksa is often associated with eating lobster. The Los Angeles Review of Books noted that with more examples of shiksa characters, particularly on television, the concept became less taboo and more of a common stereotype.

Actresses Candice Bergen and Dianna Agron have both been described as "the archetypal shiksa" based on their roles; Agron is Jewish and Bergen is not, though she speaks Yiddish.

In the 1997 Seinfeld episode "The Serenity Now", the term "shiksappeal" is used to describe the character Elaine and why every Jewish man she meets seems to be drawn to her.

In the 1999 The West Wing episode "A Proportional Response", shiksa is used by Josh Lyman during an argument with C.J. Cregg where he says "I really think I'm the best judge of what I mean, you paranoid Berkeley shiksa feminista! [beat] Whoa. That was way too far."

In the 2001 musical "The Last Five Years", the second song is named Shiksa Goddess and describes the relationship between the two main characters, the Jewish male lead of Jamie and the not Jewish female lead of Cathy. The song also features in the 2014 film version The Last Five Years (film) starring Jeremy Jordan (actor, born 1984) and Anna Kendrick.

In the 2009 The Big Bang Theory episode "The Jiminy Conjecture", the Jewish Howard Wolowitz is explaining the term shiksa ("We don't pray to them – we prey on them!") to his best friend, the Hindu Dr. Rajesh Koothrappali. Raj wins the argument by pointing out their friend Dr. Leonard Hofstadter has one, while Howard does not.

In 2014, in the eighth episode of the fifth season of Downton Abbey, the term shiksa is used by the Jewish Lord Sinderby to describe Lady Rose MacClare (his son's Anglican fiancée) to his son Atticus Aldridge, as part of an argument between father and son over the former's disapproval of a non-Jewish marriage.

In the fifth episode of the first season of The Marvelous Mrs. Maisel, Joel Maisel's father uses the term to disparage the non-Jewish woman Joel left his wife for, stating, "Shiksas are for practice."

== Derivatives ==
In Polish, siksa or sziksa (pronounced [ɕiksa]) is a pejorative but humorous word for an immature young girl or teenage girl. According to Polish language dictionary from 1915, it has been defined as "pisspants"; a conflation between the Yiddish term and its similarity to the Polish verb sikać ("to piss"). In today's language however, it is roughly equivalent to the English terms "snot-nosed brat", "little squirt", and "naughty schoolgirl" in a humorous context.

In German, Schickse roughly means a promiscuous woman, with no religious or ethnic implications.

In Victorian England, London slang included "shickster" and "shakester", alternative spellings of the same word used among lower-class men to refer to the wives of their direct superiors (who were still lower-class women). As forms of the word entered British English more popularly, the implications became further detached, meaning variously a servant; a woman of low parentage; or a prostitute. By the middle of the 20th century, the word had dropped out of usage in Britain; the Los Angeles Review of Books suggests any continued use would be by older people referring to maids. The North American word "shiksa" is not (or rarely) used in British Jewish communities.

== See also ==
- Goy
