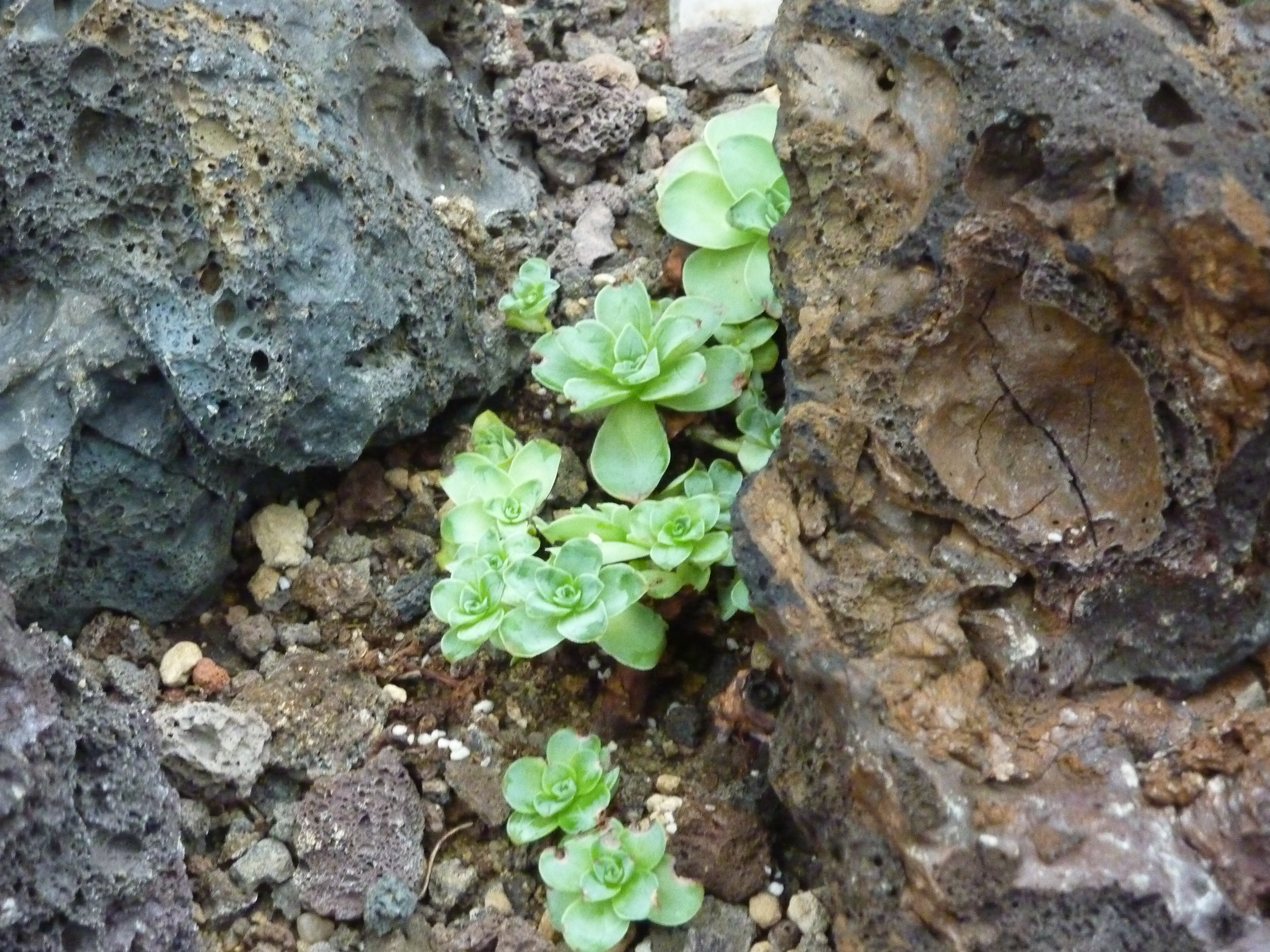

Scientific classification
- Kingdom: Plantae
- Clade: Tracheophytes
- Clade: Angiosperms
- Clade: Eudicots
- Order: Saxifragales
- Family: Crassulaceae
- Genus: Aeonium
- Species: A. dodrantale

Binomial name
- Aeonium dodrantale (Willd.) T. H. M. Mes

Synonyms
- Sempervivum gracile (Bolle) Christ; Sempervivum dodrantale Willd.; Greenovia gracilis Bolle; Greenovia dodrantalis (Willd.) Webb & Berth.

= Aeonium dodrantale =

Species of plant

Aeonium dodrantale is a species of tree houseleek in the family Crassulaceae.

== Systematics ==
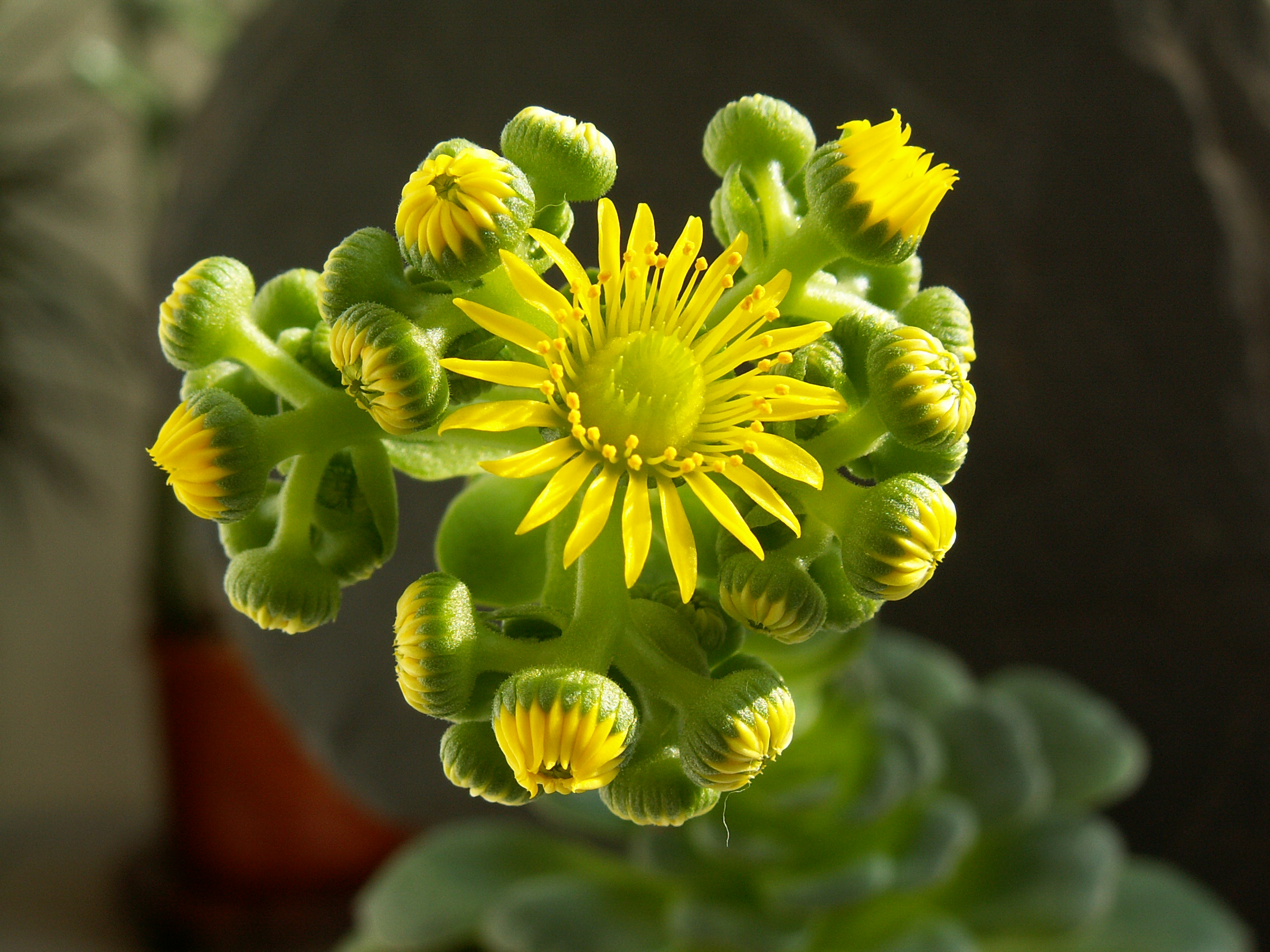
Flowers

The first description was as Sempervivum dodrantale by Carl Ludwig von Willdenow was published in 1809. Theodorus Hendrikus Maria Mes put the species in 1995 in the genus Aeonium.

A synonym in nomenclature is Greenovia dodrantalis (Willd.) Webb & Berthel. (1841).

== Description ==
The species grows as a perennial, densely budding rosette plant, the offshoots on long thin, smooth stems. The cup-shaped or urn-shaped rosettes reach a diameter of 2 to 6 centimetres (0.79 to 2.36 in) and are tightly closed during the dry season. Their leaves are tightly packed during growth. The leaves are obovate to spatulate, pale glaucous greyish-green, 2 to 3.5 cm (0.79 to 1.38 in) long, 1 to 1.5 cm (0.39 to 0.59 in) wide and 1–2 mm thick; the leaf apex varies between pointed, rounded, or slightly notched. Towards the top they are rounded or truncated and are often finished. The base is broadly wedge-shaped or slightly narrowed. The leaf margin is translucent.

The flattened inflorescence has a length of 3 to 6 cm (1.2 to 2.4 in) and a width of 5 to 10 cm (2.0 to 3.9 in). The densely leafed peduncle is 10 to 25 cm (3.9 to 9.8 in) long. The 18 to 23-fold flowers are on a 2–4 mm long, glandular-fluffy flower stem. The sepals are glandular-fluffy. The deep yellow, reverse lanceolate petals are 6–7 mm long and 1–1.5 mm wide. The stamens are bare. The flowers are 24-merous in all of their parts (i.e. typically 24 sepals, 24 petals, 24 stamens and 24 carpels)

== Distribution ==
Aeonium dodrantale is restricted to the Macizo de Anaga (Anaga Peninsula) in the far east of Tenerife, occurring at heights of 150 to 1200 m.
