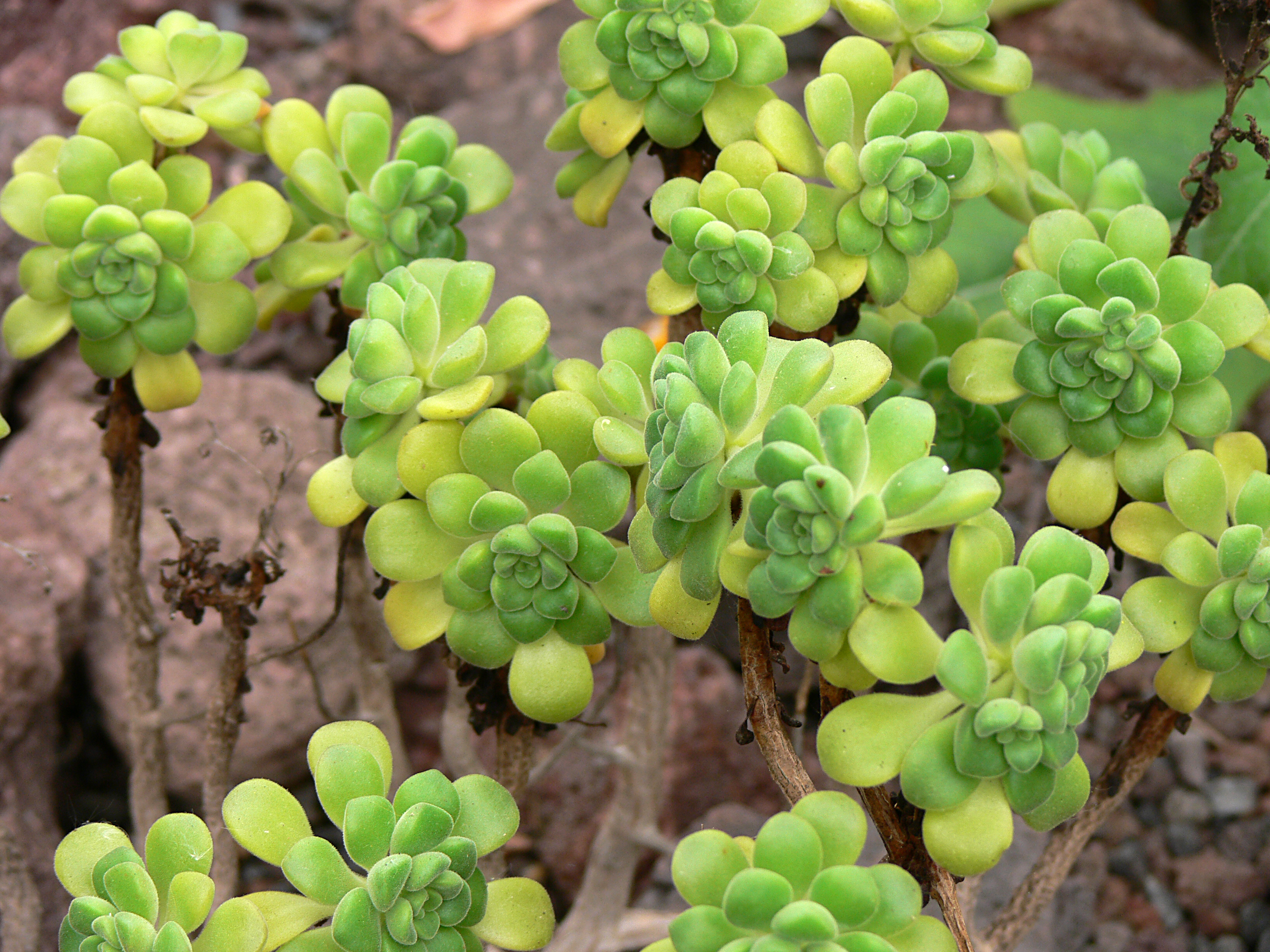

Scientific classification
- Kingdom: Plantae
- Clade: Tracheophytes
- Clade: Angiosperms
- Clade: Eudicots
- Order: Saxifragales
- Family: Crassulaceae
- Genus: Aeonium
- Species: A. lindleyi

Binomial name
- Aeonium lindleyi Webb & Berthel.

Synonyms
- Sempervivum lindleyi (Webb & Berthel.) Christ; Sempervivum villosum Lindl.

= Aeonium lindleyi =

Species of flowering plant

Aeonium lindleyi is a species of flowering plant in the family Crassulaceae. It is native to the island of Tenerife in the Canary Islands, where it grows in dry rocky regions. It was first described by Philip Barker-Webb and Sabin Berthelot in 1840.

There are two subspecies of this species:

- Aeonium lindleyi subsp. lindleyi
- Aeonium lindleyi subsp. viscatum (Bolle) Bañares

== Description ==
The plant is a perennial shrub and grows up to about 20 in (510 mm) tall. It has viscid, tomentose leaves, and yellow flowers. A specimen is shown (at right) at the Botanischer Garten Krefeld in Krefeld, Germany.

== Uses ==
It contains an antidote for Euphorbia sap irritation, although a visit to an emergency room is recommended regardless of this claim.
