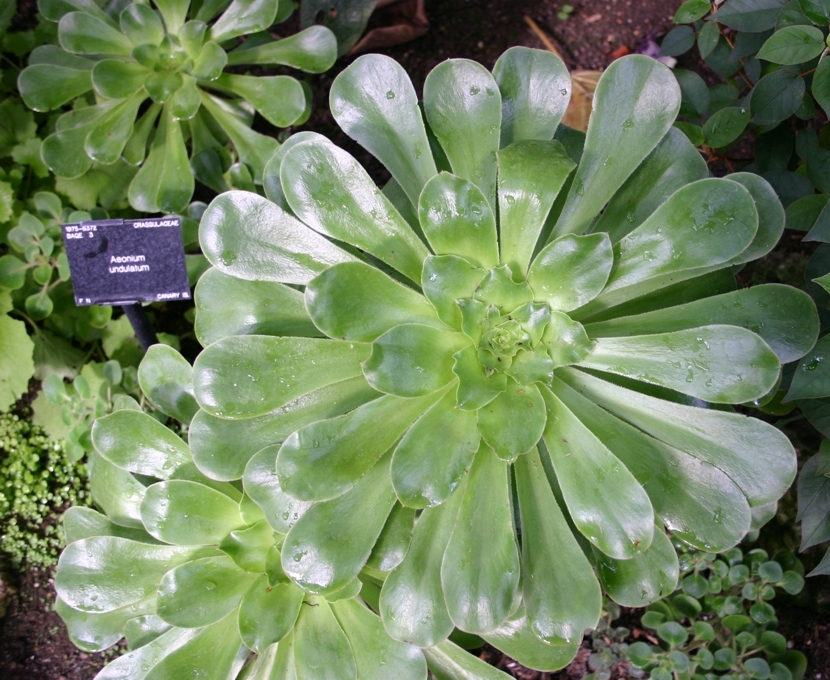
- Saucer-plant (Aeonium undulatum)

Scientific classification
- Kingdom: Plantae
- Clade: Tracheophytes
- Clade: Angiosperms
- Clade: Eudicots
- Order: Saxifragales
- Family: Crassulaceae
- Subfamily: Sempervivoideae
- Tribe: Aeonieae
- Genus: Aeonium; Webb & Berthel.

Species
- About 35, see text

= Aeonium =

Genus of succulents

Aeonium, the tree houseleeks, is a genus of about 35 species of succulent, subtropical plants of the family Crassulaceae. Many species are popular in horticulture. The genus name comes from the ancient Greek αἰώνιος / aiōnios (ageless). While most of them are native to the Canary Islands, some are found in Madeira, Cape Verde, Morocco, in East Africa (Ethiopia, Somalia, Uganda, Tanzania and Kenya) and Yemen.

== Description ==
The succulent leaves are typically arranged on a basal stem, in a dense, spreading rosette. A feature which distinguishes this genus from many of its relatives is the manner in which the flowers bear free petals, and are divided into 6 or 12 sections. With the exception of Aeonium simsii, each rosette produces a central inflorescence only once, and then dies back (though it will usually branch or offset to produce ensuing rosettes).

Low-growing Aeonium species are A. tabuliforme and A. smithii; large species include A. arboreum and A. valverdense. They are related to the genera Sempervivum, Aichryson and Monanthes, as can be seen by their similar flower and inflorescences. Recently, the genus Greenovia has been placed within Aeonium.

== Species and distribution ==
All but two species are native to at least one of three different Macaronesian archipelagos (the Canary Islands, Madeira, or Cape Verde). Most aeoniums are from the Canary Islands, The only species not native to these three Macaronesian island groups (Aeonium stuessyi and Aeonium leucoblepharum) are found in Ethiopia, Kenya and Tanzania; and Ethiopia, Kenya, Sudan, Uganda and Yemen, respectively. Aeonium arboreum is native to both the Canary Islands and Morocco.

Species accepted by Plants of the World Online as of April 2023:

Species	Distribution	
Aeonium aizoon (Bolle) T.H.M.Mes	Canary Islands (Tenerife)	Aeonium aizoon
Aeonium appendiculatum Bañares	Canary Islands (La Gomera)	Aeonium appendiculatum
Aeonium arboreum (L.) Webb & Berthel.	Canary Islands (Gran Canaria, Tenerife, La Gomera, La Palma, El Hierro); Morocco	Aeonium arboreum
Aeonium aureum (C.Sm. ex Hornem.) T.H.M.Mes	Canary Islands (Gran Canaria, Tenerife)	Aeonium aureum
Aeonium balsamiferum Webb & Berthel.	Canary Islands (Lanzarote, Fuerteventura)	Aeonium balsamiferum
Aeonium canariense (L.) Webb & Berthel.	Canary Islands (Gran Canaria, Tenerife; La Gomera, La Palma, El Hierro)	Aeonium canariense
Aeonium castello-paivae Bolle	Canary Islands (La Gomera)	Aeonium castello-paivae
Aeonium ciliatum (Willd.) Webb & Berthel.	Canary Islands (Tenerife)	Aeonium ciliatum
Aeonium cuneatum Webb & Berthel.	Canary Islands (Tenerife)	Aeonium cuneatum
Aeonium davidbramwelii H.Y.Liu	Canary Islands (La Palma)	Aeonium davidbramwelii
Aeonium decorum Webb ex Bolle	Canary Islands (Tenerife, La Gomera)	Aeonium decorum
Aeonium dodrantale (Willd.) T.H.M.Mes	Canary Islands (Tenerife)	Aeonium dodrantale
Aeonium glandulosum (Aiton) Webb & Berthel.	Maderia (Madeira, Desertas, Porto Santo)	Aeonium glandulosum
Aeonium glutinosum (Aiton) Webb & Berthel.	Madeira (Madeira, Desertas)	Aeonium glutinosum
Aeonium gomerense (Praeger) Praeger	Canary Islands (La Gomera)	Aeonium gomerense
Aeonium goochiae (Christ.) Praeger	Canary Islands (La Palma)	Aeonium goochiae
Aeonium gorgoneum J. A. Schmidt	Cabo Verde (Santo Antão, São Nicolau, São Vicente)	Aeonium gorgoneum
Aeonium haworthii (Salm-Dyck ex Webb & Berthel.) Webb & Berthel.	Canary Islands (Tenerife)	Aeonium haworthii
Aeonium hierrense (R. P. Murray) Pit. & Proust.	Canary Islands (La Palma, El Hierro)	Aeonium hierrense
Aeonium lancerottense (Praeger) Praeger	Canary Islands (Lanzarote)	Aeonium lancerottense
Aeonium leucoblepharum Webb ex A. Richard	Yemen, Ethiopia, Sudan, Kenya, Uganda	Aeonium leucoblepharum
Aeonium lindleyi Webb & Berthel.	Canary Islands (Tenerife)	Aeonium lindleyi
Aeonium liui Arango	Canary Islands (Tenerife)	
Aeonium nobile (Praeger) Praeger	Canary Islands (La Palma)	Aeonium nobile
Aeonium percarneum (R. P. Murray) Pit. & Proust.	Canary Islands (Gran Canaria)	Aeonium percarneum
Aeonium rubrolineatum Svent.	Canary Islands (La Gomera)	
Aeonium saundersii Bolle	Canary Islands (La Gomera)	Aeonium saundersii
Aeonium sedifolium (Webb ex Bolle) Pit. & Proust.	Canary Islands (Tenerife, La Gomera, La Palma))	Aeonium sedifolium
Aeonium simsii (Sweet) Stearn.	Canary Islands (Gran Canaria)	Aeonium simsii
Aeonium smithii (Sims) Webb & Berthel.	Canary Islands (Tenerife)	Aeonium smithii
Aeonium spathulatum (Hornem.) Praeger	Canary Islands (Gran Canaria, Tenerife; La Gomera, La Palma, El Hierro)	Aeonium spathulatum
Aeonium stuessyi H.-Y. Liu	Ethiopia, Kenya, Tanzania	
Aeonium tabuliforme (Haw.) Webb & Berthel.	Canary Islands (Tenerife)	Aeonium tabuliforme
Aeonium undulatum Webb & Berthel.	Canary Islands (Gran Canaria)	Aeonium undulatum
Aeonium urbicum (C. Sm. ex Hornem.) Webb & Berthel.	Canary Islands (Tenerife)	Aeonium urbicum
Aeonium valverdense (Praeger) Praeger	Canary Islands (El Hierro)	Aeonium valverdense

== Hybrids ==
Much hybridising has been done, resulting in several cultivars of mixed or unknown parentage. The following species and cultivars have gained the Royal Horticultural Society's Award of Garden Merit:-

- Aeonium tabuliforme
- Aeonium haworthii
- Aeonium haworthii 'Variegatum'
- Aeonium 'Blushing Beauty'
- Aeonium 'Sunburst'
- Aeonium 'Zwartkop'

Hybridising between Aeonium species or cultivars and other Crassulaeceae species or cultivars has produced intergeneric crosses:

- x Semponium 'Sienna' (Sempervivum 'Green Ice' x Aeonium 'Ice Warrior').
- x Semponium 'Destiny' - winner of the Royal Horticultural Society Chelsea Flower Show 'Chelsea Plant of the Year 2022' award.

Some species have been introduced in California.

UK national collections of aeoniums are held by Mellie Lewis at Clun in Shropshire and by Inverewe at Poolewe, Wester Ross in Scotland.

== Images ==
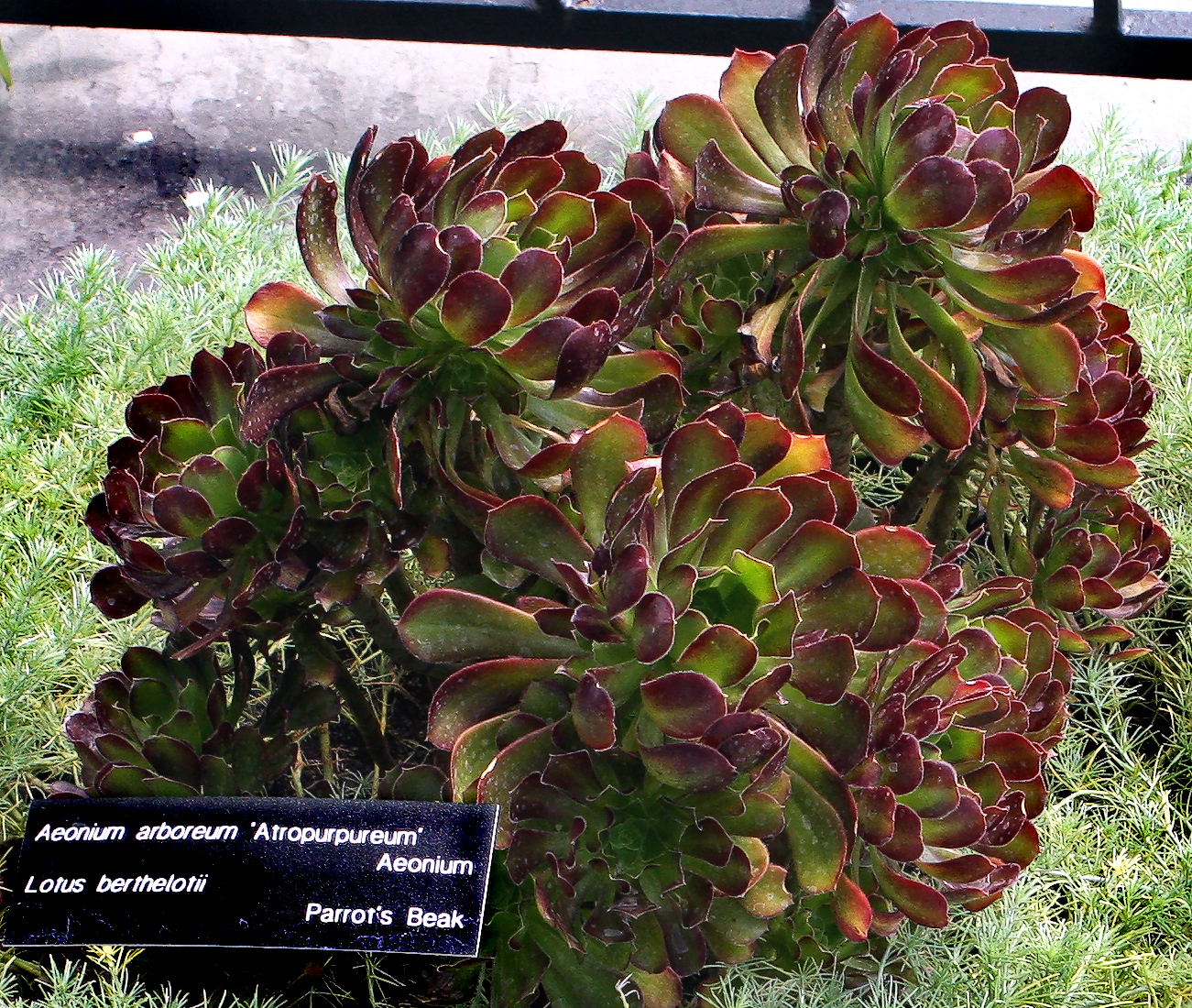
Aeonium arboreum 'Atropurpureum'

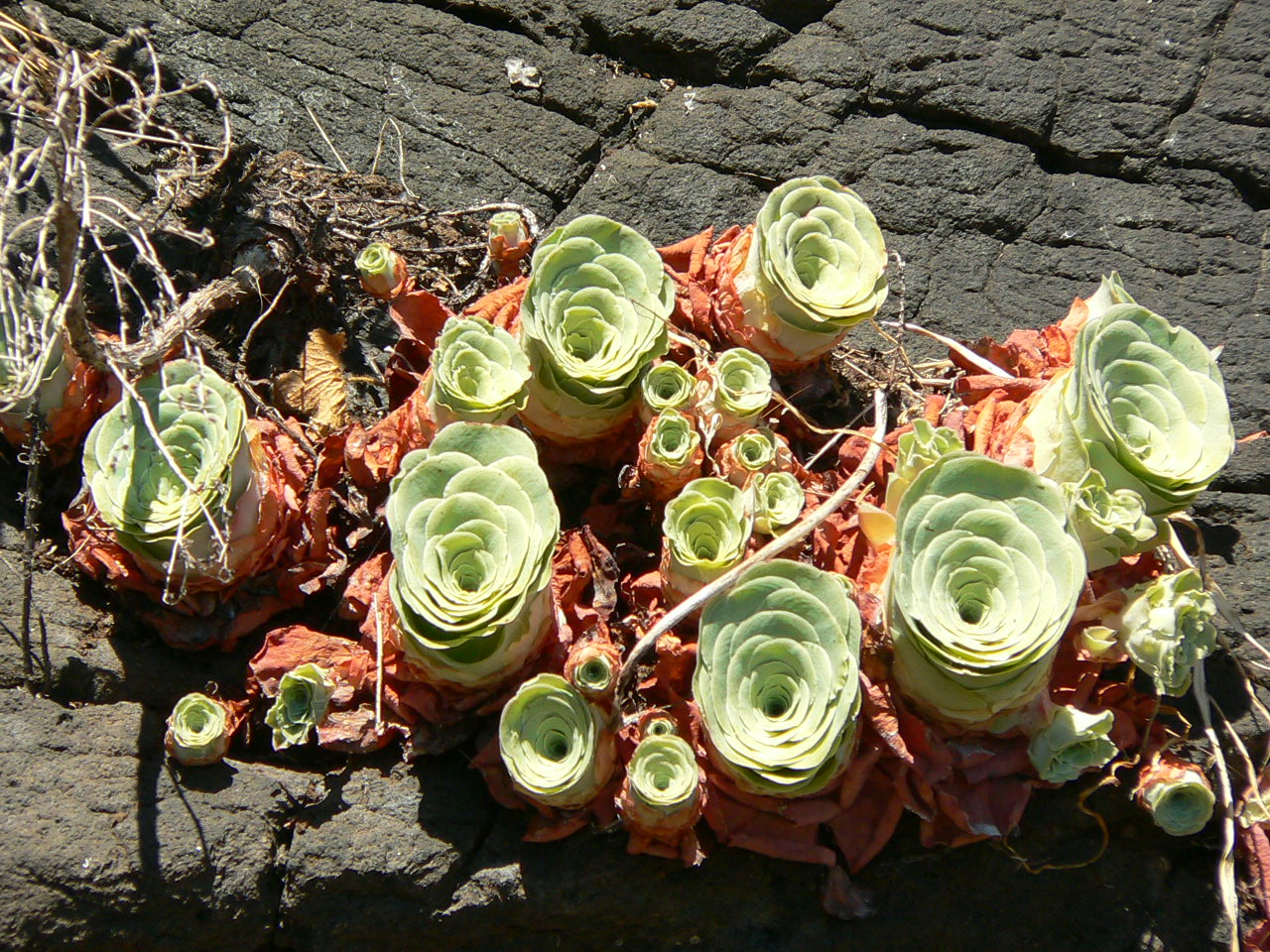
Aeonium aureum

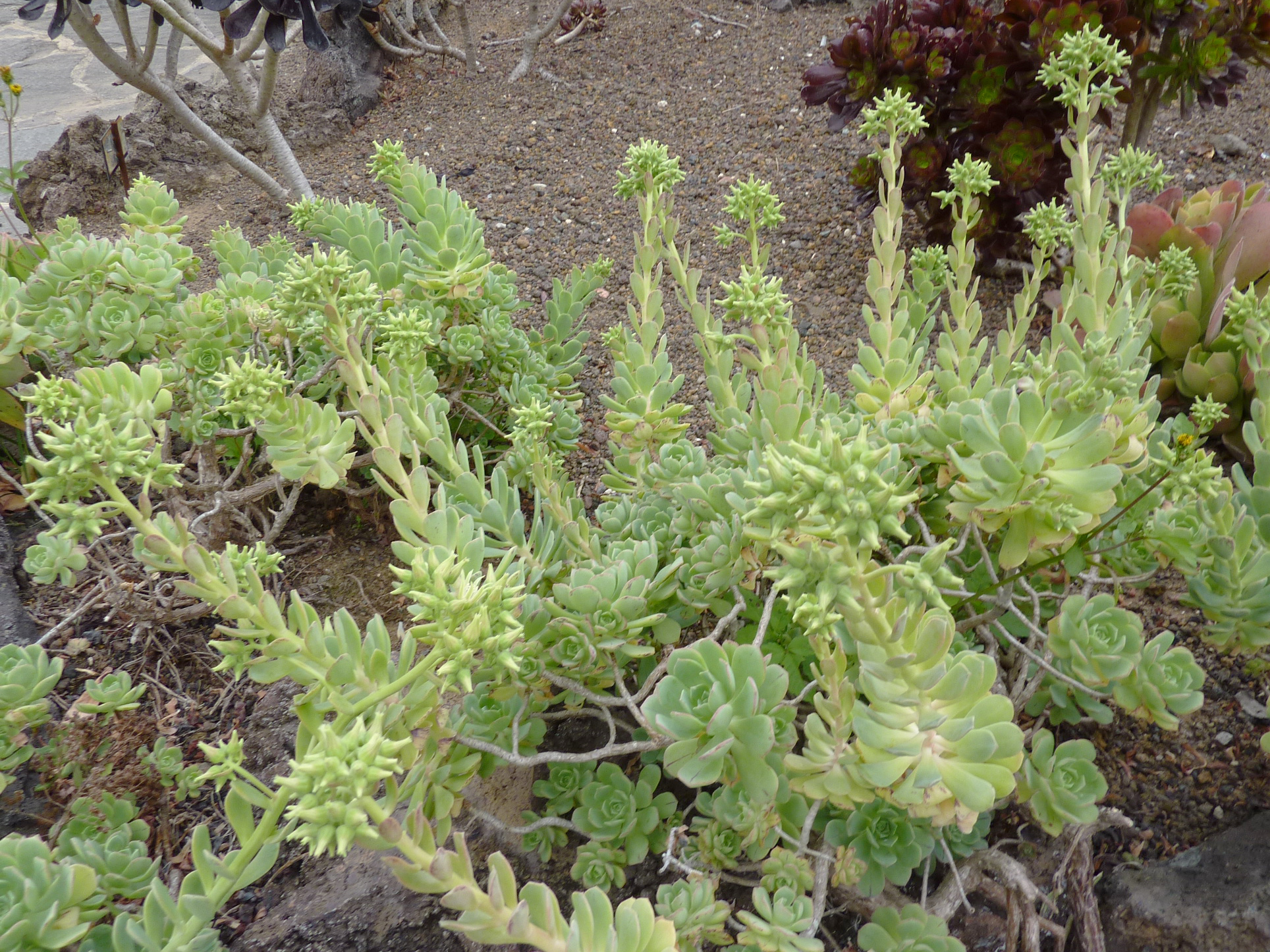
Aeonium castello-paivae

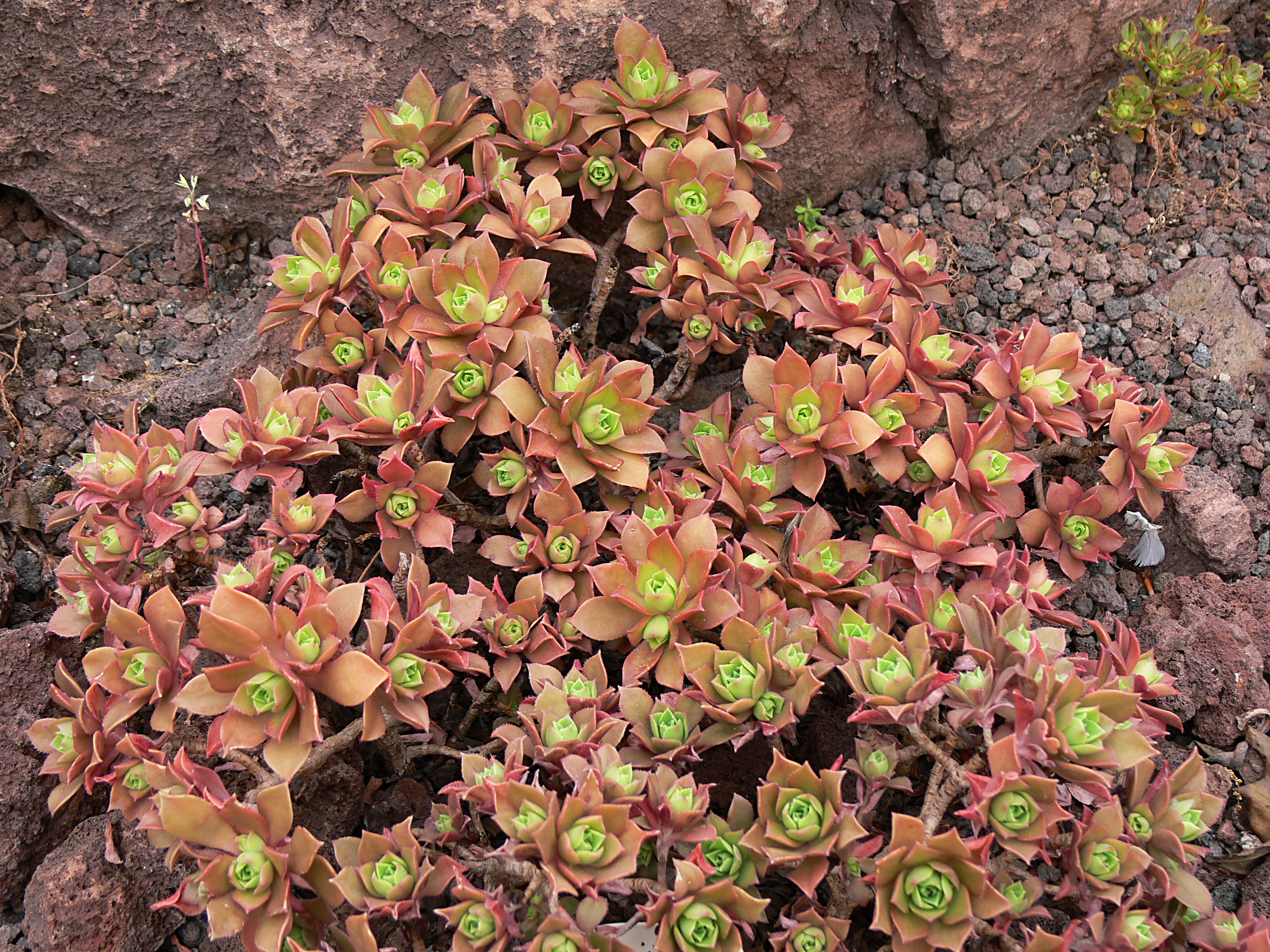
Aeonium decorum

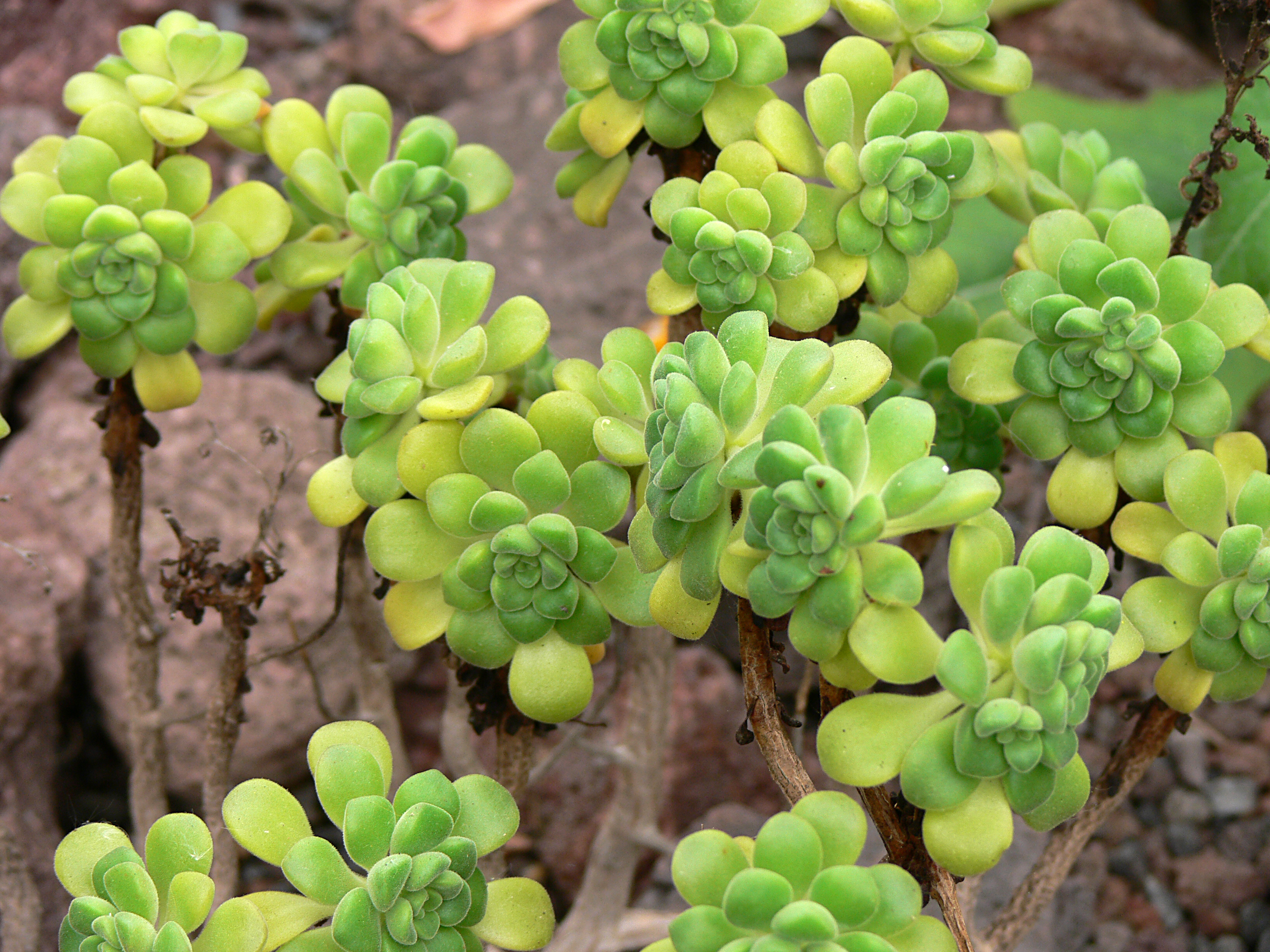
Aeonium lindleyi

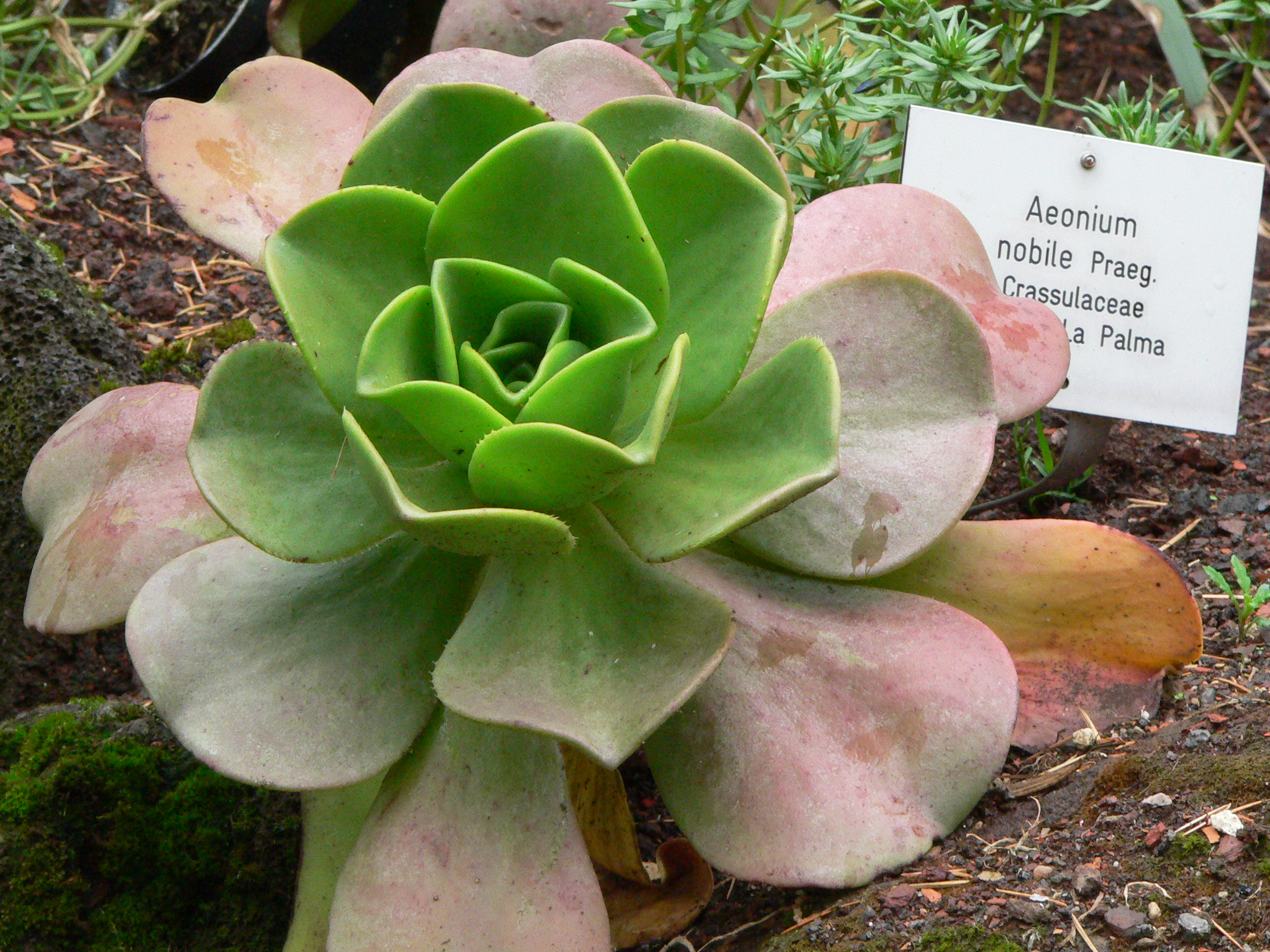
Aeonium nobile

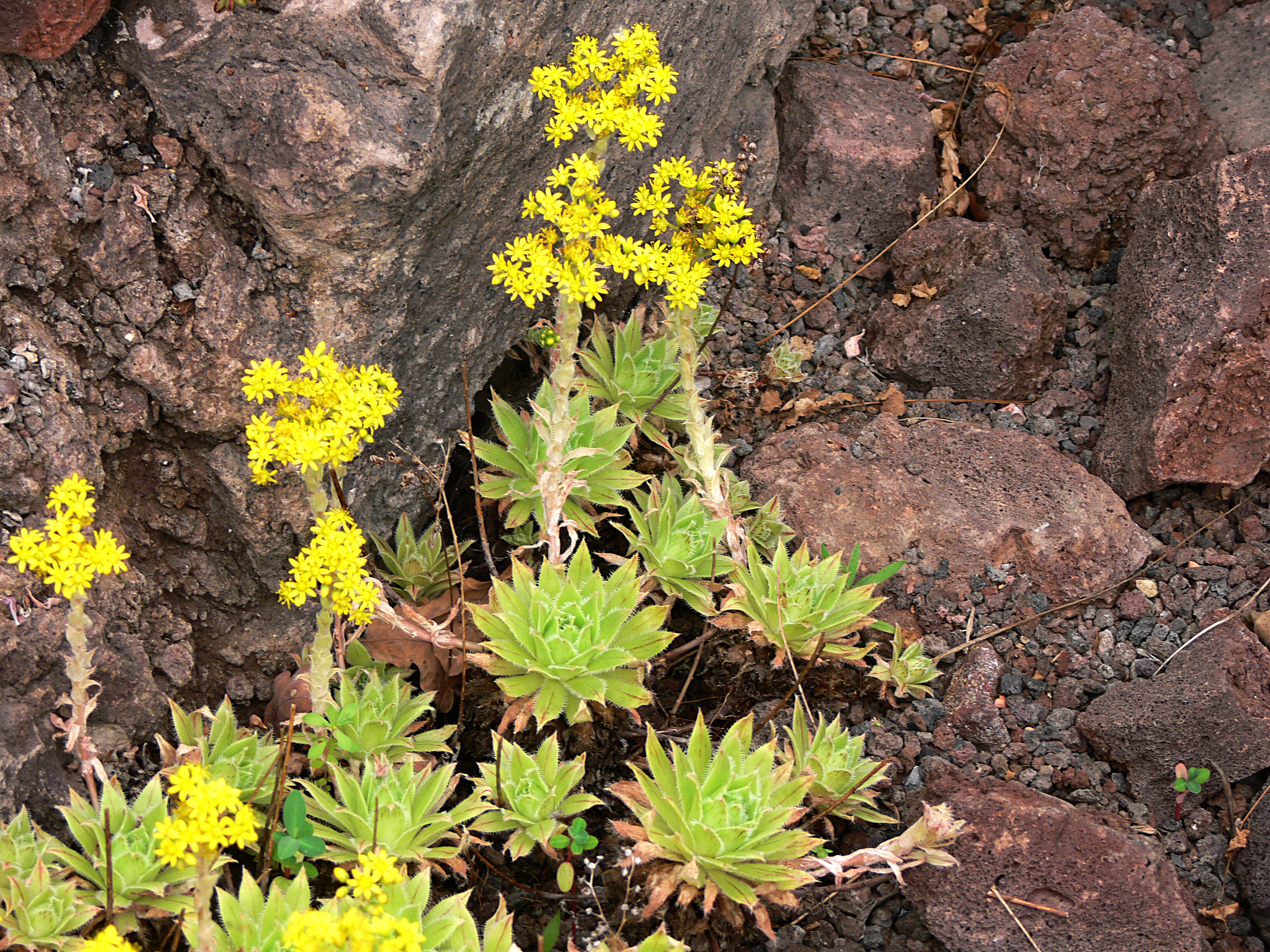
Aeonium simsii

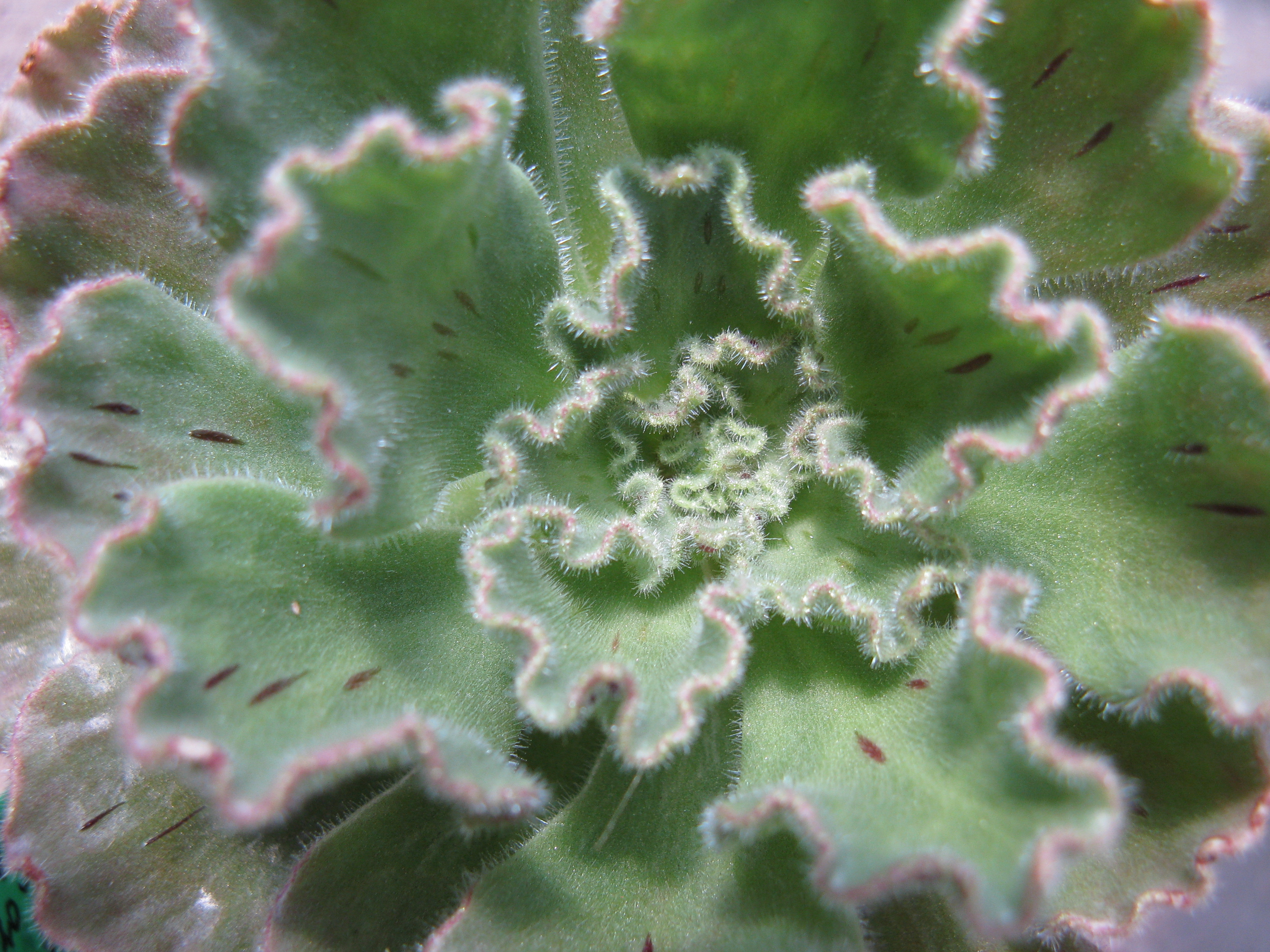
Aeonium smithii

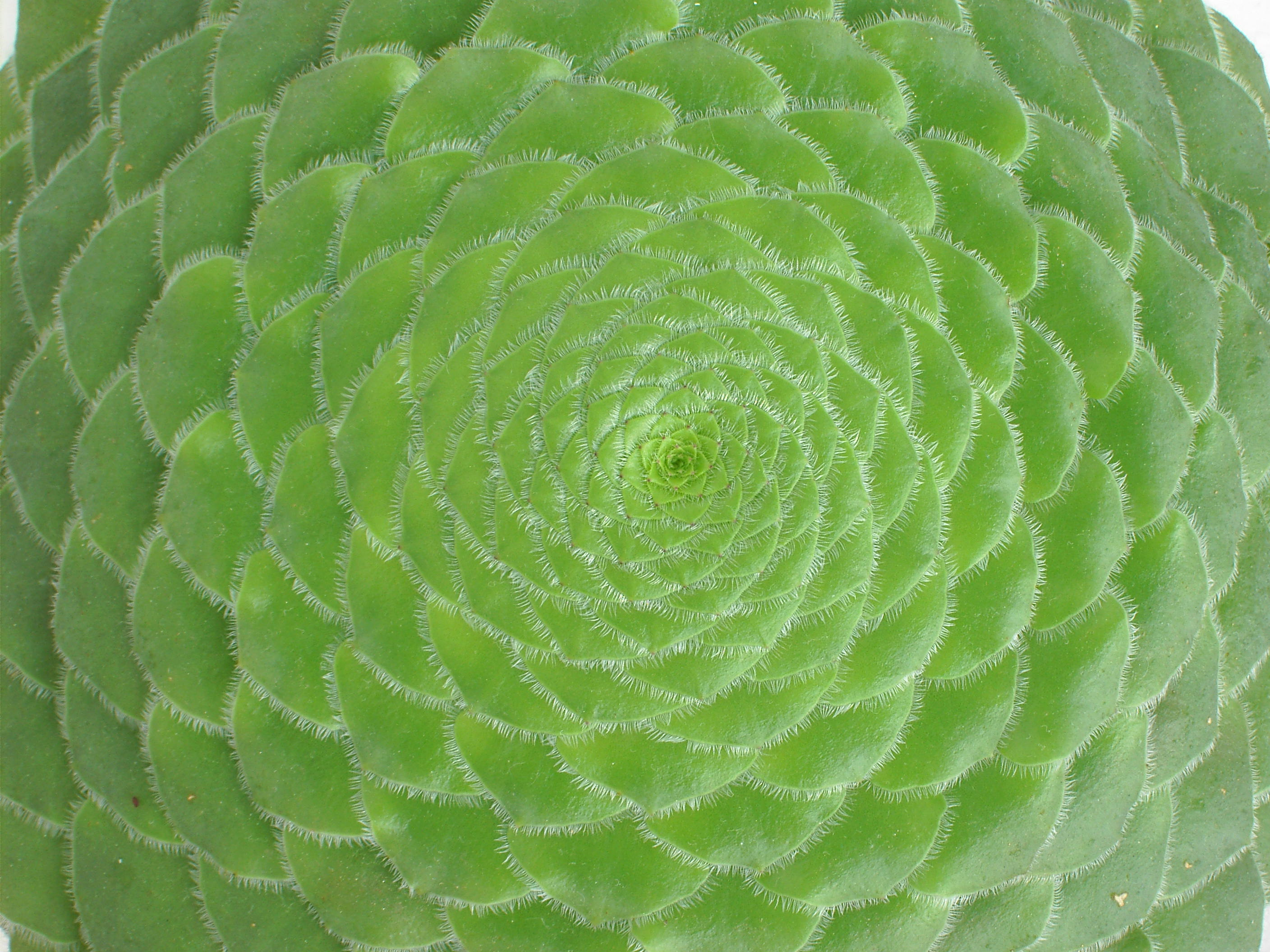
Aeonium tabuliforme

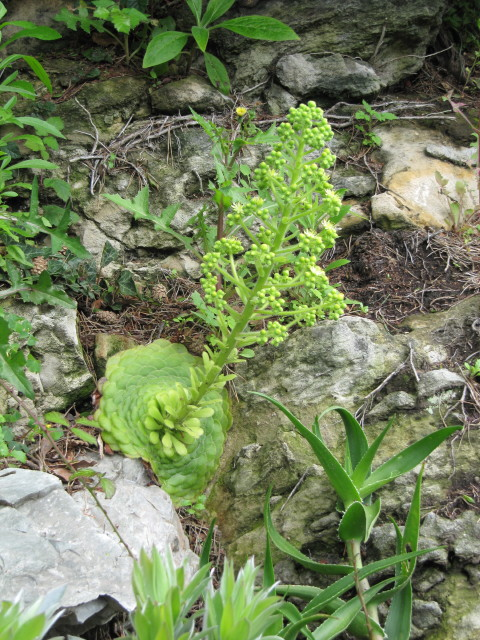
Aeonium tabuliforme bearing inflorescence

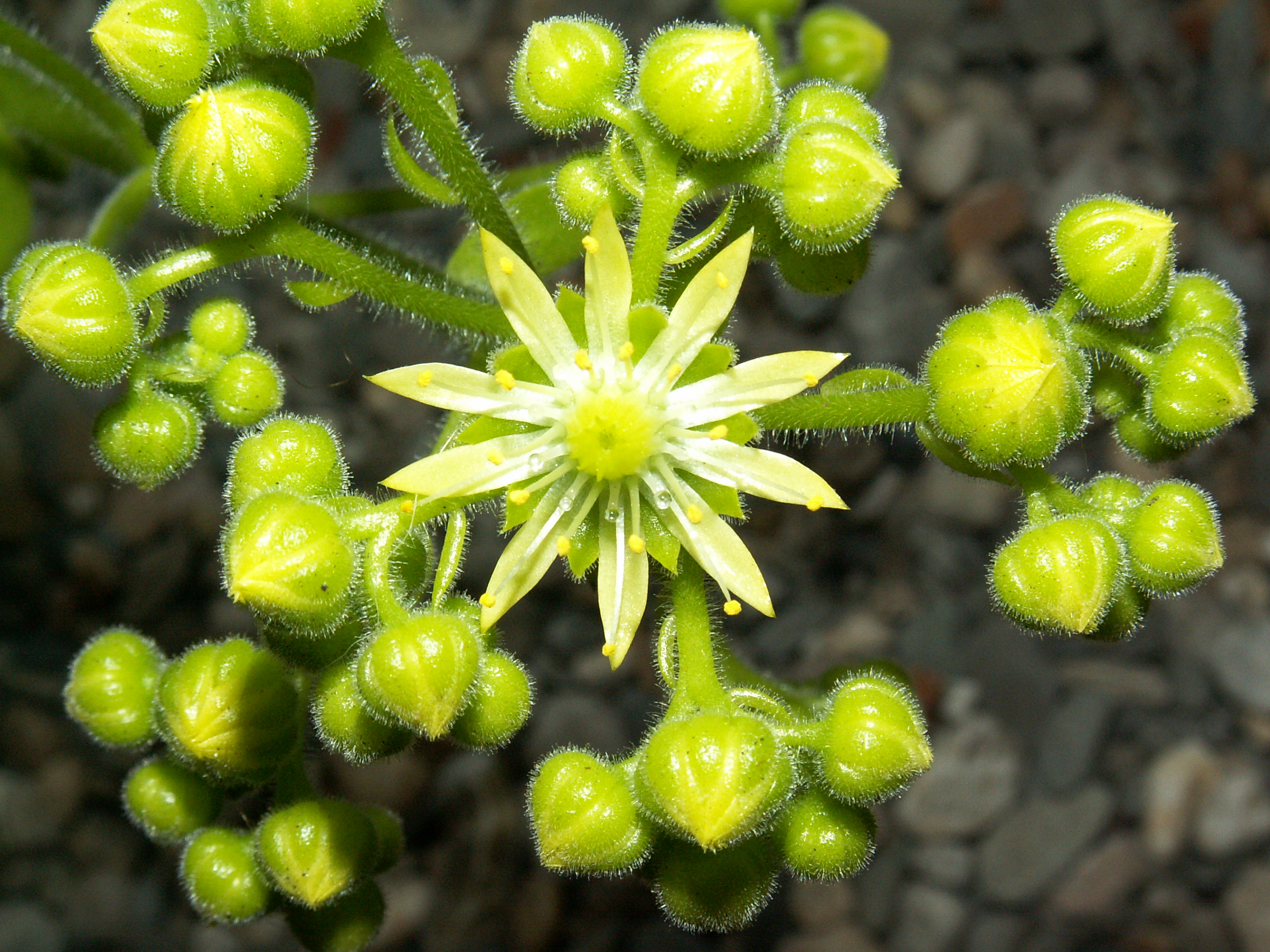
Detail of Aeonium tabuliforme flower

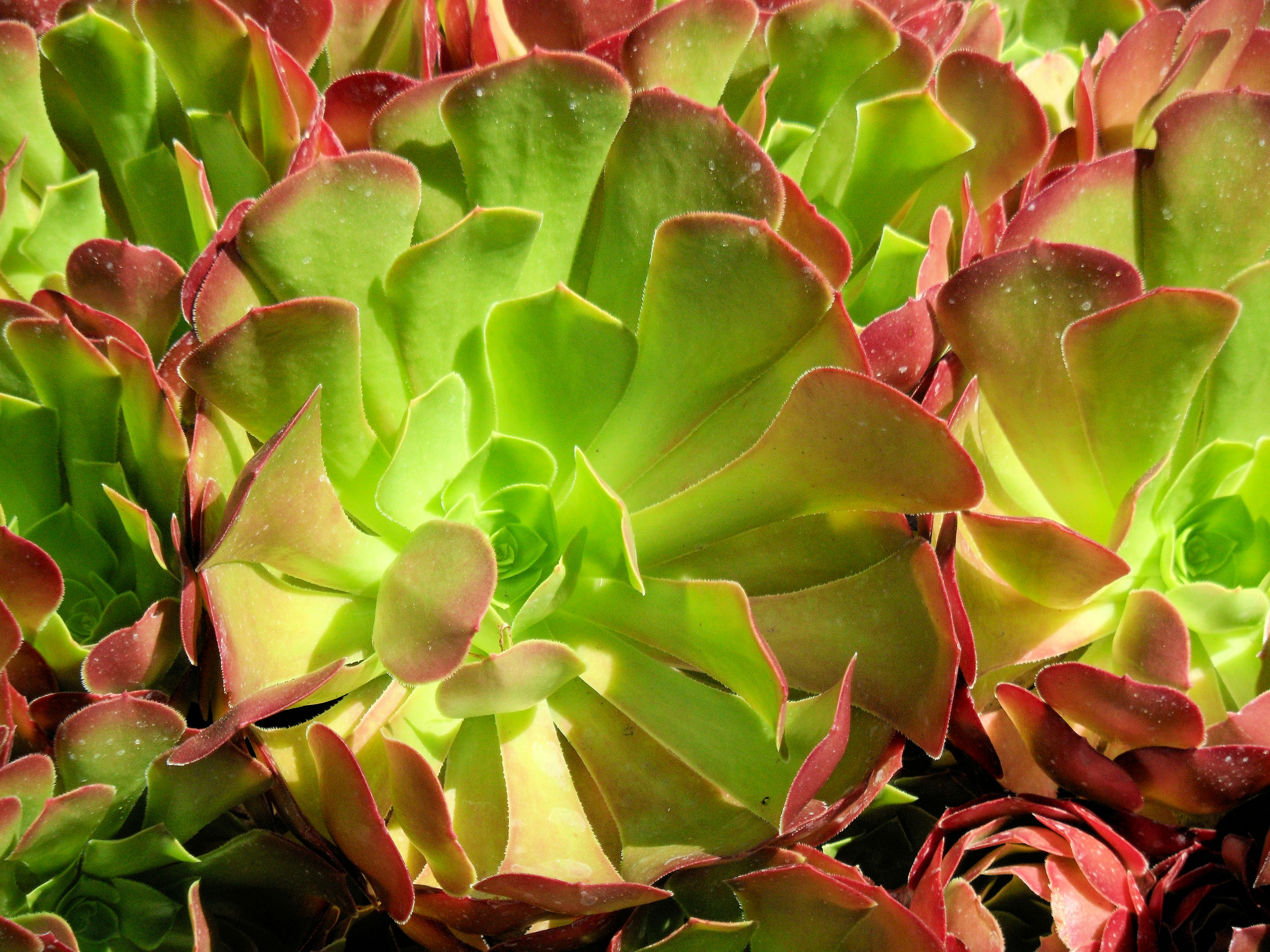
Aeonium tabuliforme × arboreum 'Zwartkop'

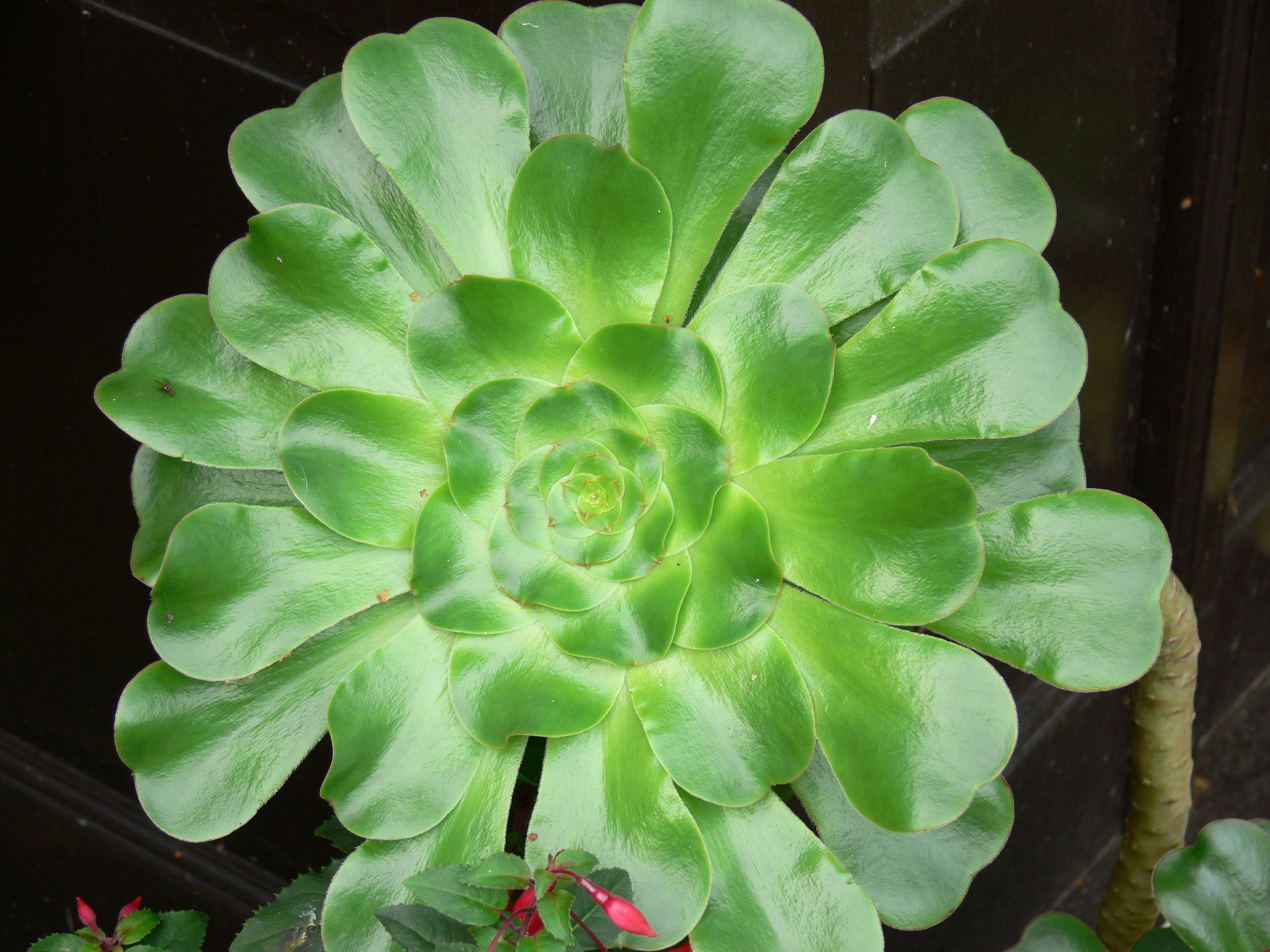
Aeonium undulatum

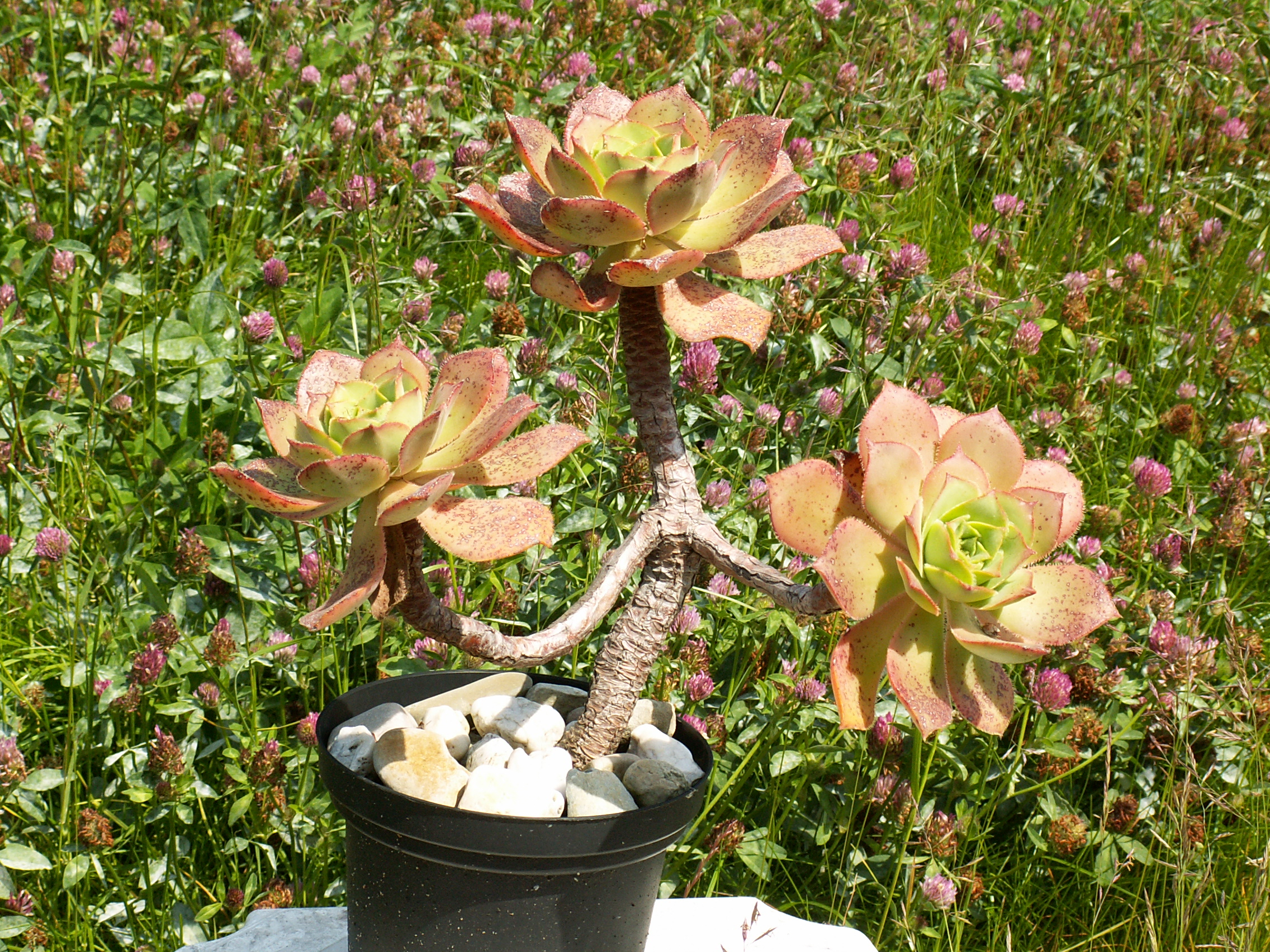
Aeonium valverdense
