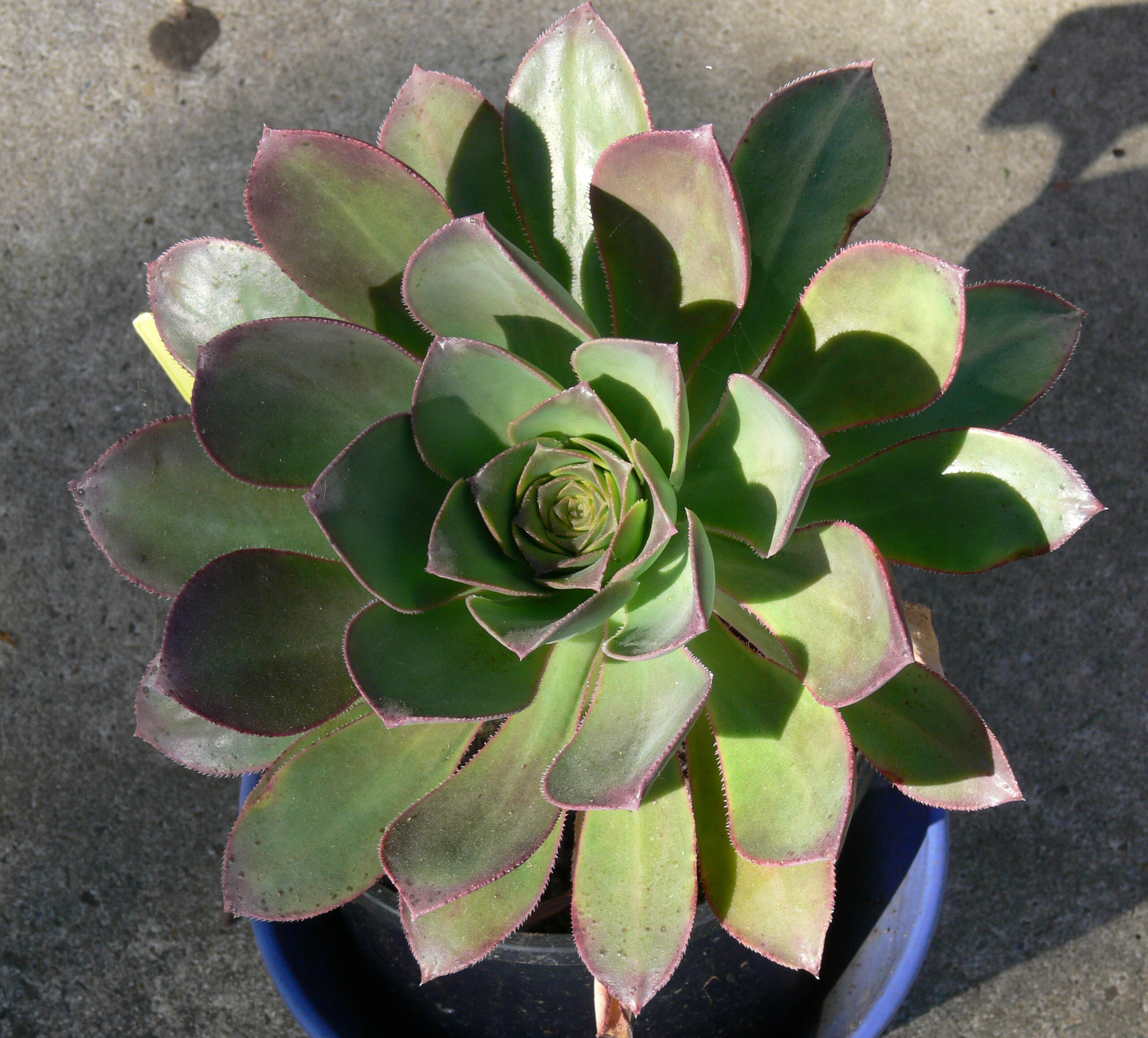

Scientific classification
- Kingdom: Plantae
- Clade: Tracheophytes
- Clade: Angiosperms
- Clade: Eudicots
- Order: Saxifragales
- Family: Crassulaceae
- Genus: Aeonium
- Species: A. hierrense

Binomial name
- Aeonium hierrense (R.P.Murray) J.Pitard & L.Proust

Synonyms
- Sempervivum hierrense R.P.Murray

= Aeonium hierrense =

Species of succulent

Aeonium hierrense is a species of succulent flowering plant in the family Crassulaceae that is endemic to the island of El Hierro in the Canary islands. It has whorls of strongly ciliate leaves borne on a stem up to 1m in height. The leaves takes on an attractive purple colour during the summer, being quite green in the winter. It produces whitish pink flowers that have 8-fold symmetry.
