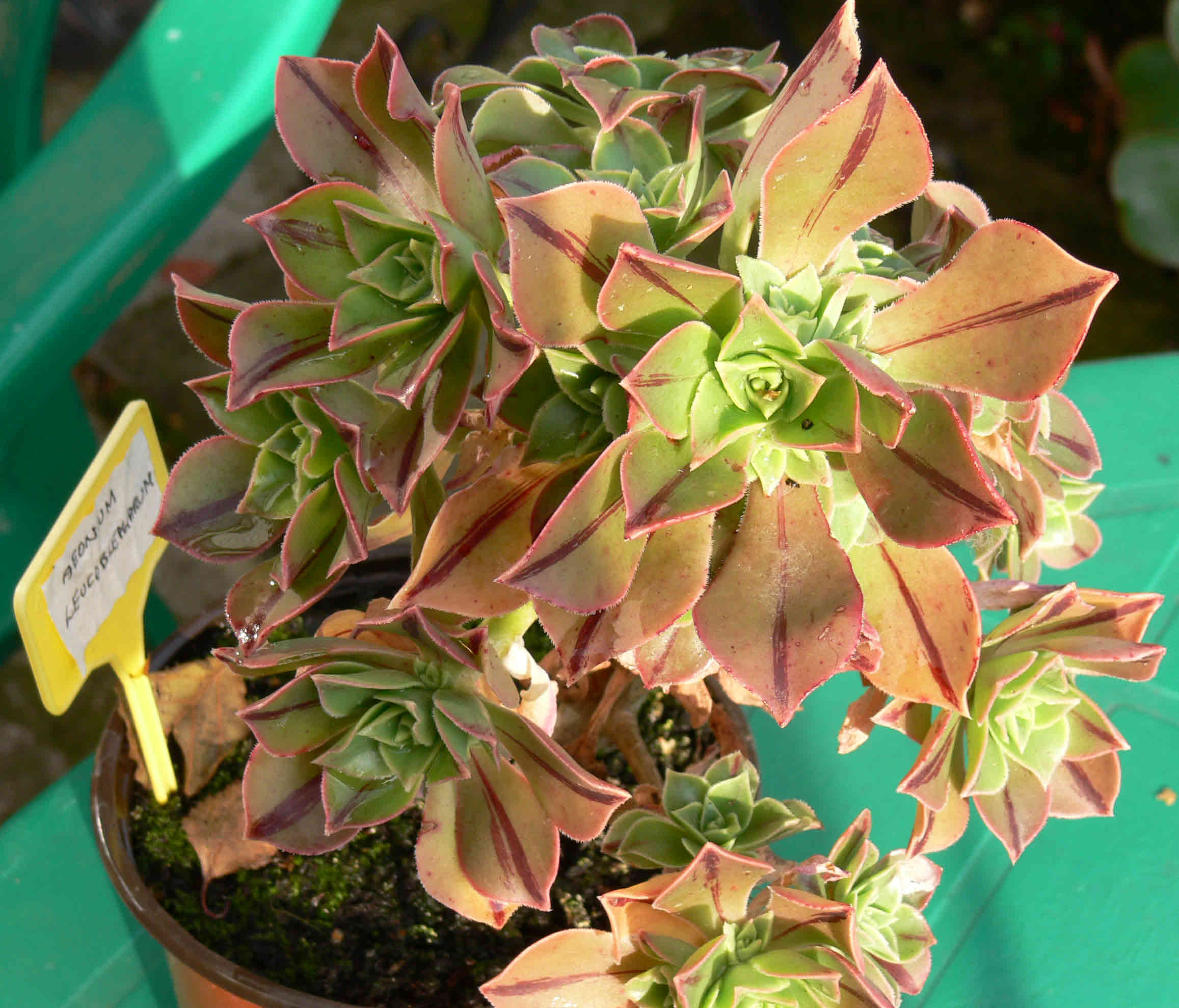

Scientific classification
- Kingdom: Plantae
- Clade: Tracheophytes
- Clade: Angiosperms
- Clade: Eudicots
- Order: Saxifragales
- Family: Crassulaceae
- Genus: Aeonium
- Species: A. leucoblepharum

Binomial name
- Aeonium leucoblepharum Webb ex A.Rich.

Synonyms
- Aeonium chrysanthum (Hochst. ex J.Britten) A.Berger

= Aeonium leucoblepharum =

Species of succulent

Aeonium leucoblepharum is a succulent flowering plant in the family Crassulaceae. The pointed leaves have a strong central stripe, and they may develop pinkish colour on exposure to strong sunlight. There are variants with less pointed leaves but still with the central stripe. The flowers are yellow, 7- to 10-merous, with petals 6 – 8 x 1.8 – 2.5 mm. The species is native to mountains in Yemen and north-eastern Africa, from Ethiopia and Somalia to Kenya and Uganda.
