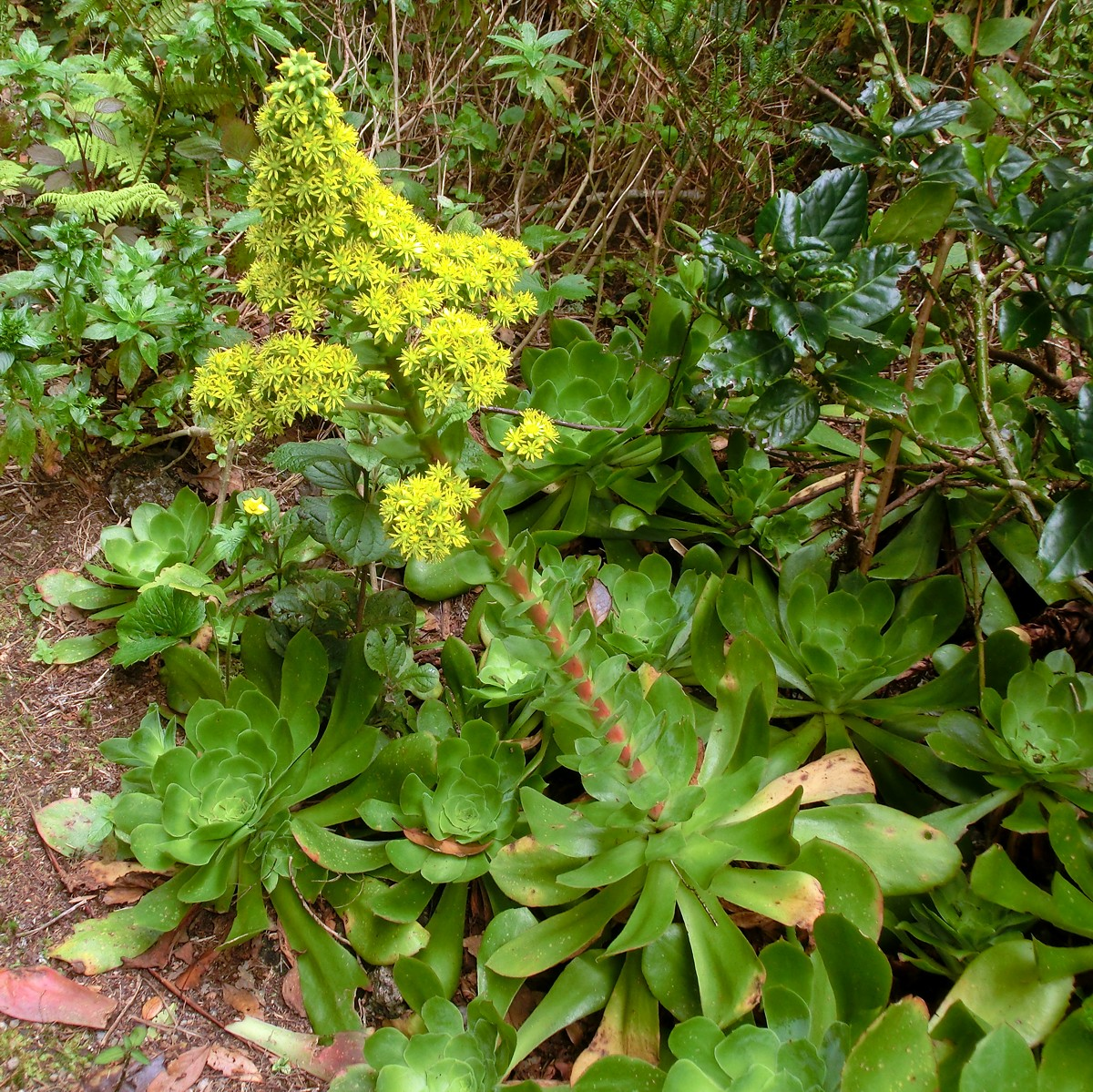

Scientific classification
- Kingdom: Plantae
- Clade: Tracheophytes
- Clade: Angiosperms
- Clade: Eudicots
- Order: Saxifragales
- Family: Crassulaceae
- Genus: Aeonium
- Species: A. cuneatum

Binomial name
- Aeonium cuneatum Webb & Berthel.

= Aeonium cuneatum =

Species of succulent

Aeonium cuneatum is a succulent species of flowering plant in the family Crassulaceae. It is native to the island of Tenerife in the Canary Islands. It has a large leaf rosette and no stem. The leaves are smooth but have a grey shine to the upper surface which can be rubbed. It offshoots easily which makes a large group of Aeoniums across the ground. The flower is yellow and more open than the flowers of some other Aeonium species.

The Latin specific epithet cuneatum means "wedge-shaped;" this refers to the shape of the leaves.

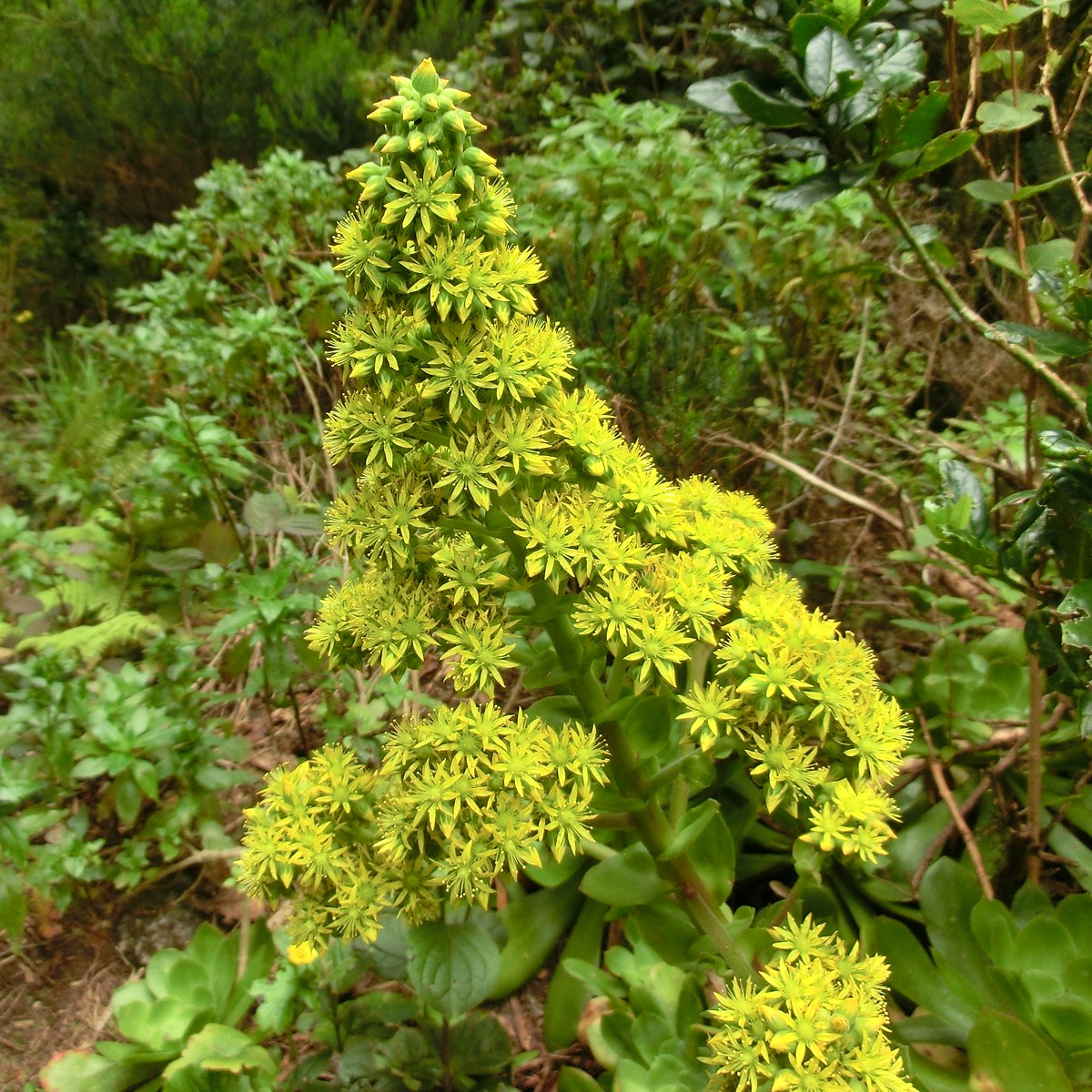
