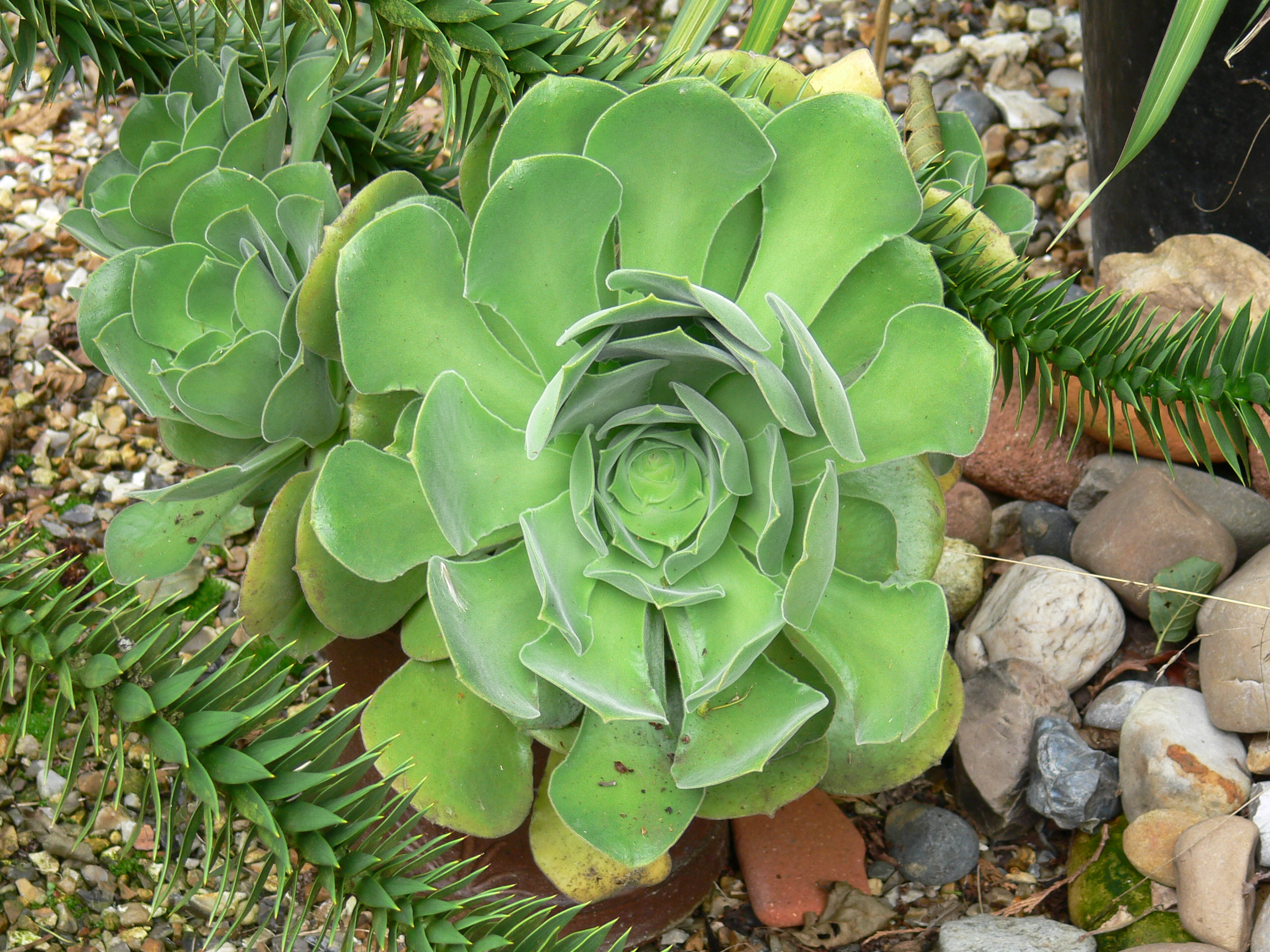

Scientific classification
- Kingdom: Plantae
- Clade: Embryophytes
- Clade: Tracheophytes
- Clade: Angiosperms
- Clade: Eudicots
- Order: Saxifragales
- Family: Crassulaceae
- Genus: Aeonium
- Species: A. canariense

Binomial name
- Aeonium canariense Webb & Berthel.

Subspecies
- 5; see text

Synonyms
- Sempervivum canariense L.

= Aeonium canariense =

Species of flowering plant in the stonecrop family

Aeonium canariense is a species of flowering plant in the family Crassulaceae. It forms large rosettes of leaves close to the ground but the spikes of yellow flowers stand up to 70 cm tall. It is endemic to the Canary Islands, with five subspecies native to different islands. Subspecies canariense is native of Tenerife in the Canary Islands, where it grows on dry slopes and cliffs in the north of the island from sea level to about 1,300 m (4,300 ft).

== Subspecies ==
Five subspecies are accepted.

- Aeonium canariense subsp. canariense – Tenerife
- Aeonium canariense subsp. christii (Praeger) Bañares – La Palma
- Aeonium canariense subsp. latifolium (Burchard) Bañares – La Gomera
- Aeonium canariense subsp. longithyrsum (Burchard) Cristini – northern El Hierro
- Aeonium canariense subsp. virgineum (Webb ex Christ) Bañares – northern and northwestern Gran Canaria
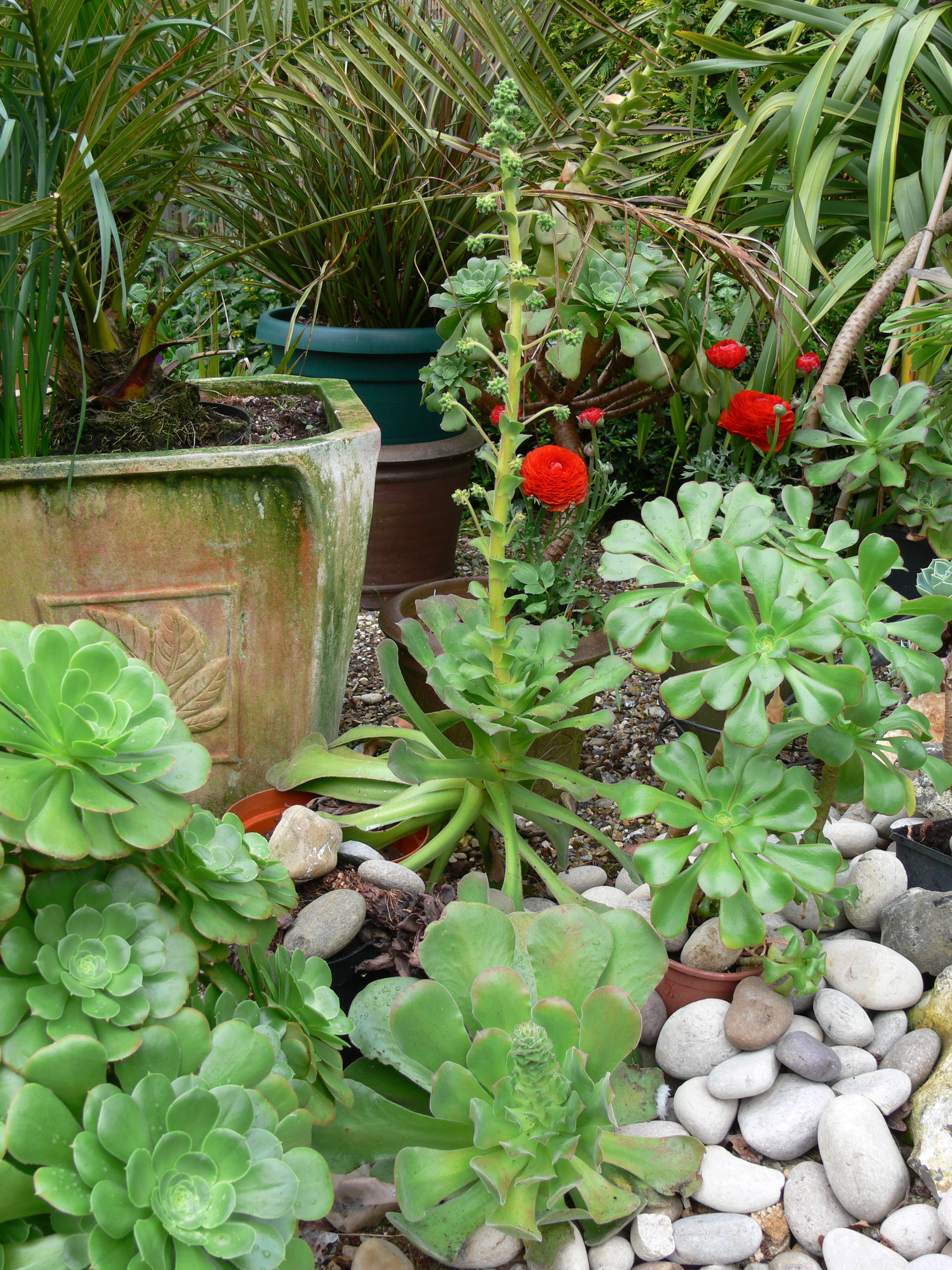
Flower head

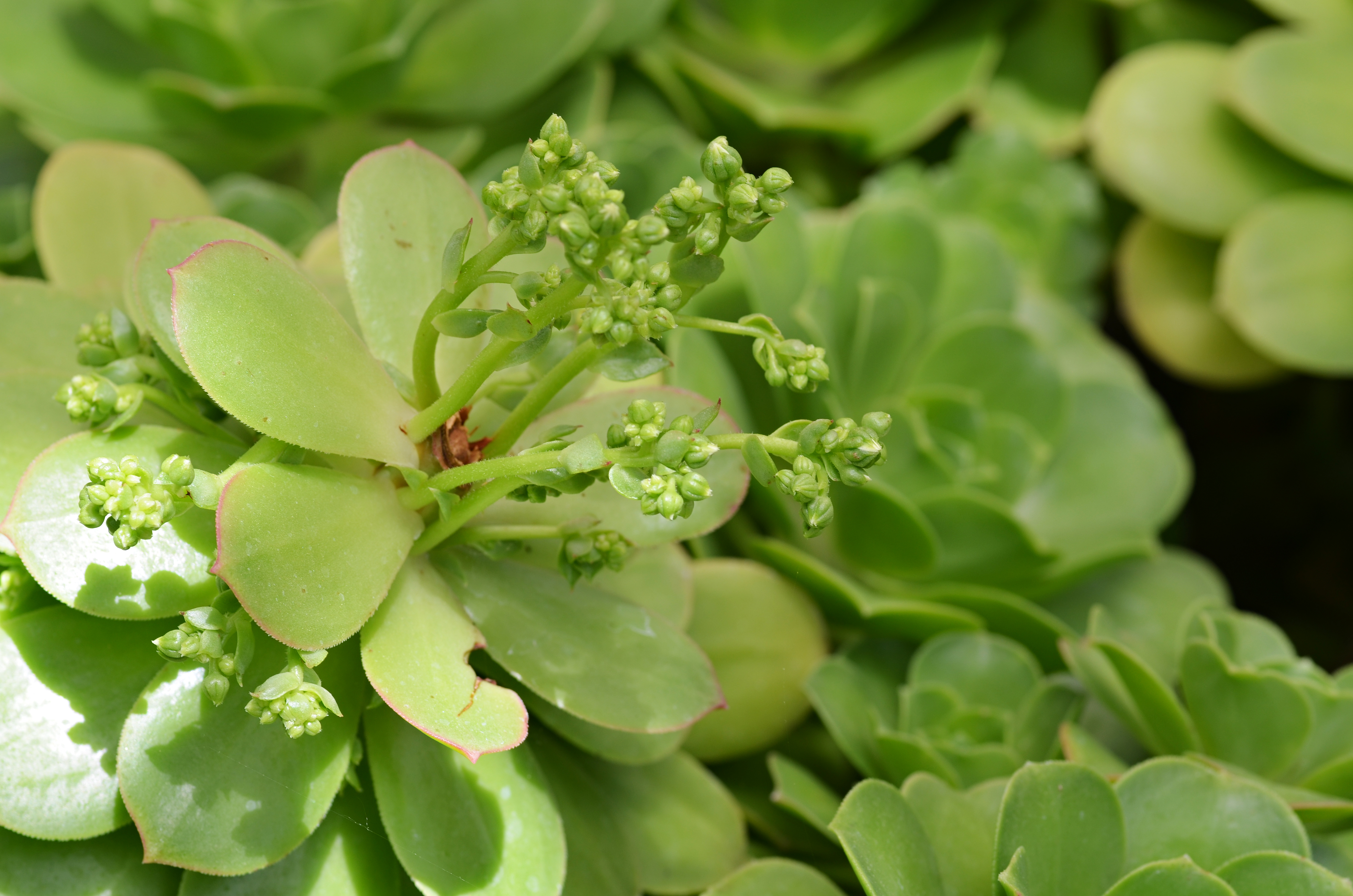
Flower buds

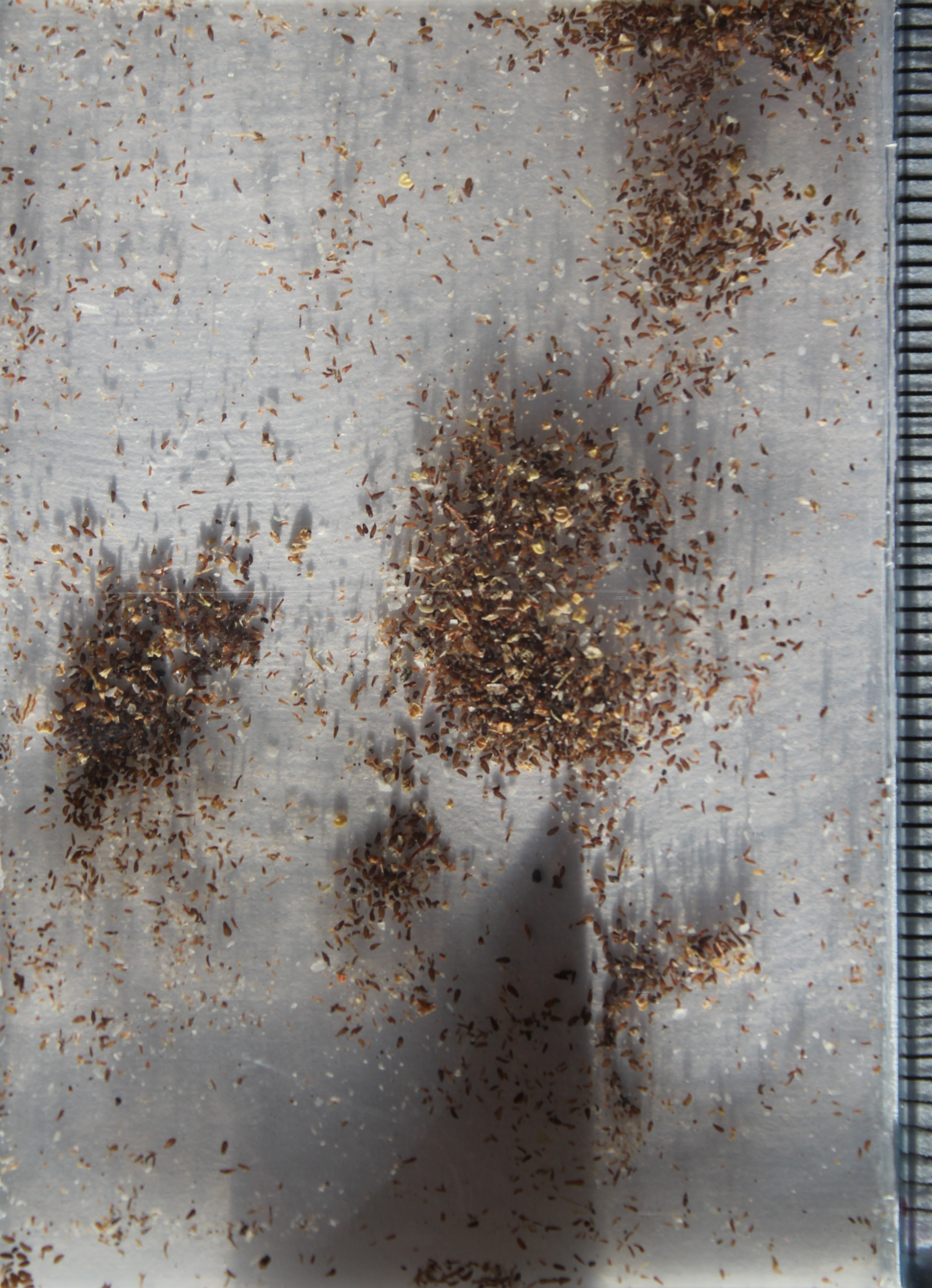
Seeds
