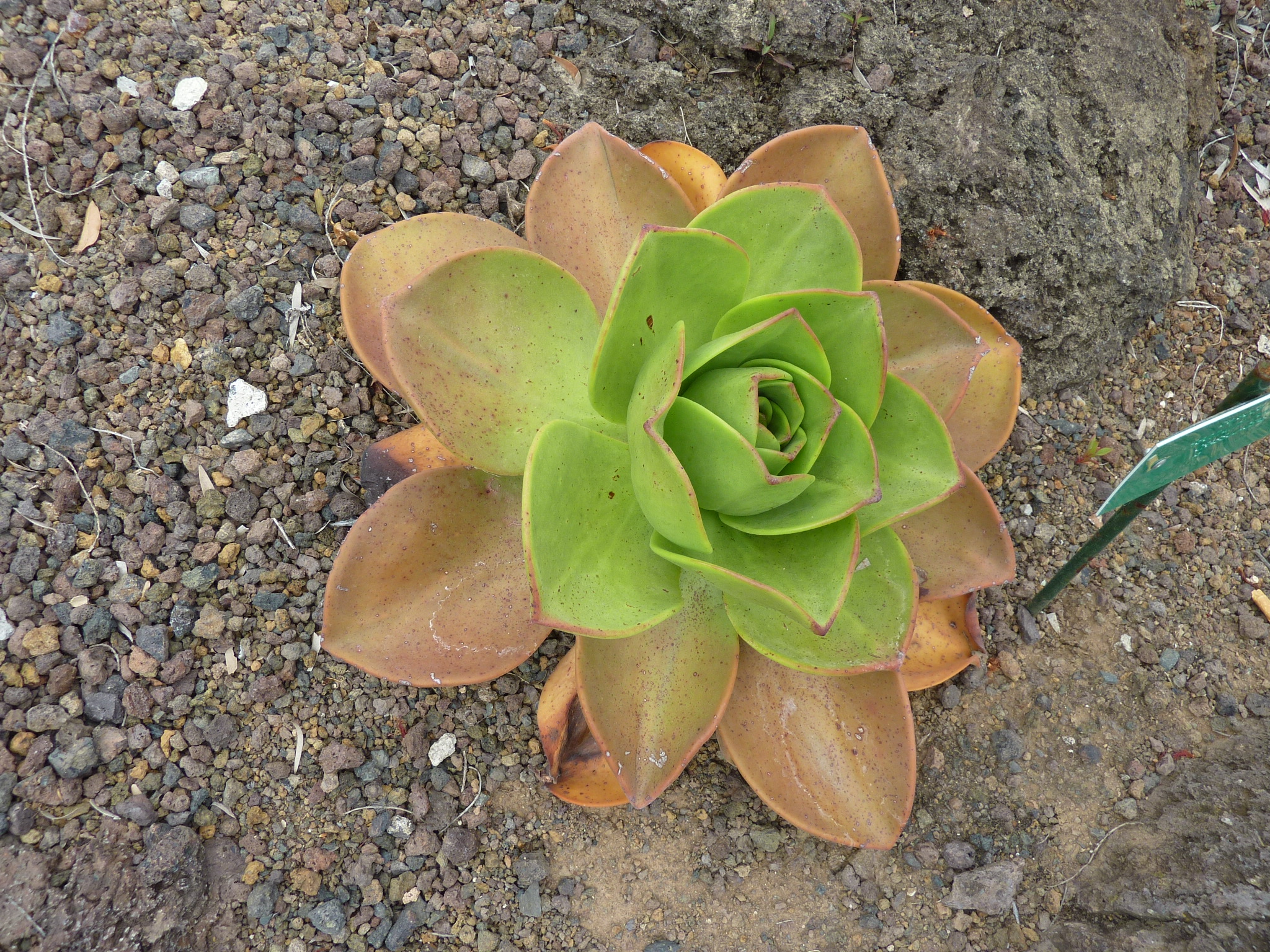

Scientific classification
- Kingdom: Plantae
- Clade: Tracheophytes
- Clade: Angiosperms
- Clade: Eudicots
- Order: Saxifragales
- Family: Crassulaceae
- Genus: Aeonium
- Species: A. nobile

Binomial name
- Aeonium nobile (Praeger) Praeger

Synonyms
- Megalonium nobile (Praeger) Kunkel; Sempervivum nobile Praeger

= Aeonium nobile =

Species of succulent

Aeonium nobile is a succulent, subtropical flowering plant in the family Crassulaceae. It is native to the island of La Palma in the Canary Islands, where it grows on dry slopes and cliffs at altitudes up to 800m. The inflorescences are large and spreading with bright red flowers.
