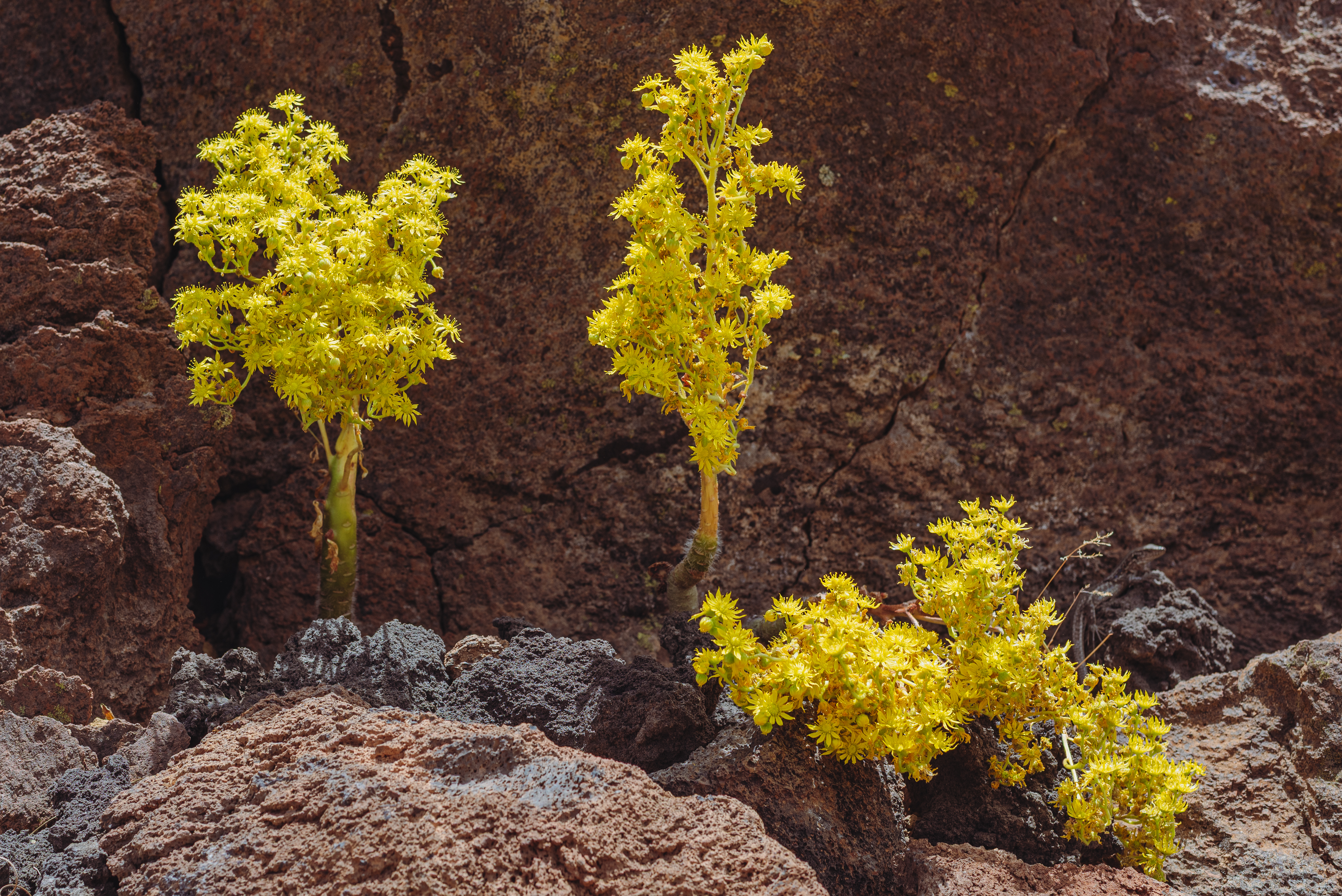

Scientific classification
- Kingdom: Plantae
- Clade: Embryophytes
- Clade: Tracheophytes
- Clade: Spermatophytes
- Clade: Angiosperms
- Clade: Eudicots
- Order: Saxifragales
- Family: Crassulaceae
- Genus: Aeonium
- Species: A. smithii

Binomial name
- Aeonium smithii (Sims) Webb & Berthelot, 1840

Synonyms
- Sempervivum smithii Sims (1818); Sempervivum hispicaule Haworth (1819); Sempervivum foliosum C.Smith ex Otto (1820)

= Aeonium smithii =

Species of plant

Aeonium smithii, the Smith's treeleek, is a succulent plant in the flowering plant family Crassulaceae.

== Description ==
Aeonium smithii grows as a perennial, densely branched shrublet. The plant stem is smooth with a diameter of 7-30mm and has a growth height of up to 60 cm. They are densely covered by multicellular trichomes of length 3–8mm. This hairy covering distinguishes it from other species in the Genus Aeonium.

Its relatively flat rosettes have a diameter of 6–15 cm. The undulate leaves are covered in two kinds of unicellular trichomes, with one having the approximate length of 0.3mm and the other one of 0.5mm. They can both be observed using a microscope.

The inflorescences bear yellow flowers and grow up to 15 cm The pedicels are puberulent and 1-9mm long and the peduncle are 4–40 cm long. The plant is flowering from May to June and fruiting during Summer.

Its chromomsome count is 18n.

== Distribution ==
The plant is endemic to the Canary Island of Tenerife. It grows there on rocks and cliffs in altitudes of 150–2150 meters and is most commonly found in the forest zone. In the Teide National Park it can be found on the cliffs on the interior side of the wall of the Caldera de Las Cañadas. A study predicted using species distribution modelling that the species might also be distributed to the islands of La Palma, La Gomera and Gran Canaria.

== Ecology ==
The species is endangered by collection of sepcimen for ornamental purposes. Its flowers are insect pollinated and its fruits wind dispersed. It can hybridise with Aeonium spathulatum.

== Etymology ==
The species was named after the botanist Christen Smith.
