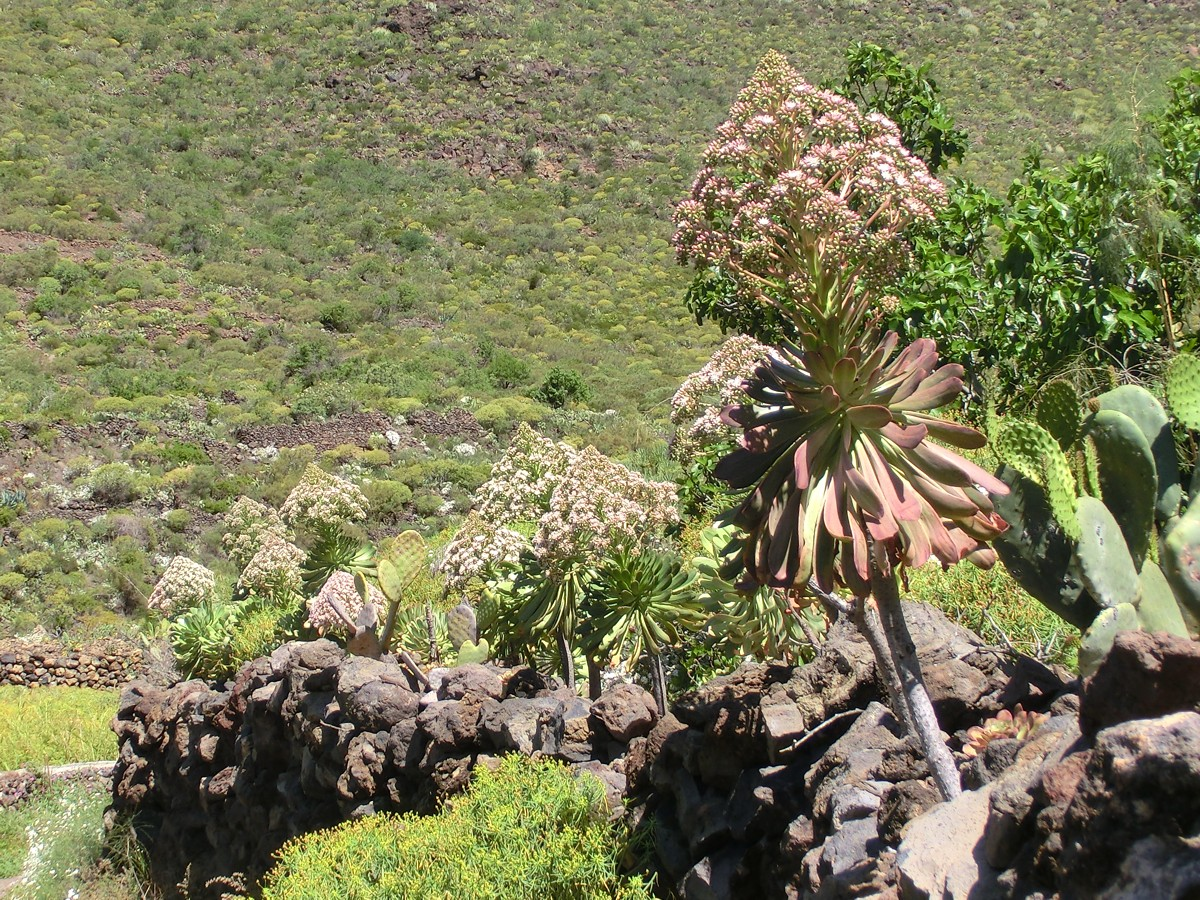

Scientific classification
- Kingdom: Plantae
- Clade: Tracheophytes
- Clade: Angiosperms
- Clade: Eudicots
- Order: Saxifragales
- Family: Crassulaceae
- Genus: Aeonium
- Species: A. urbicum

Binomial name
- Aeonium urbicum (C.Sm. ex Hornem.) Webb & Berthel.

Synonyms
- Aeonium pseudourbicum Bañares; Sempervivum urbicum C.Sm. ex Hornem.

= Aeonium urbicum =

Species of succulent

Aeonium urbicum is a succulent species of flowering plant in the family Crassulaceae. It is endemic to Tenerife, one of the Canary Islands, where it grows on the north of the island from Teno point to the Anaga peninsula. Until 1999, it was also considered a resident of La Gomera, another Canary Island, but that year the populations on that island were considered a new species and named Aeonium appendiculatum.

Aeonium urbicum was also divided into varieties, var. urbicum and var. meridionale.
