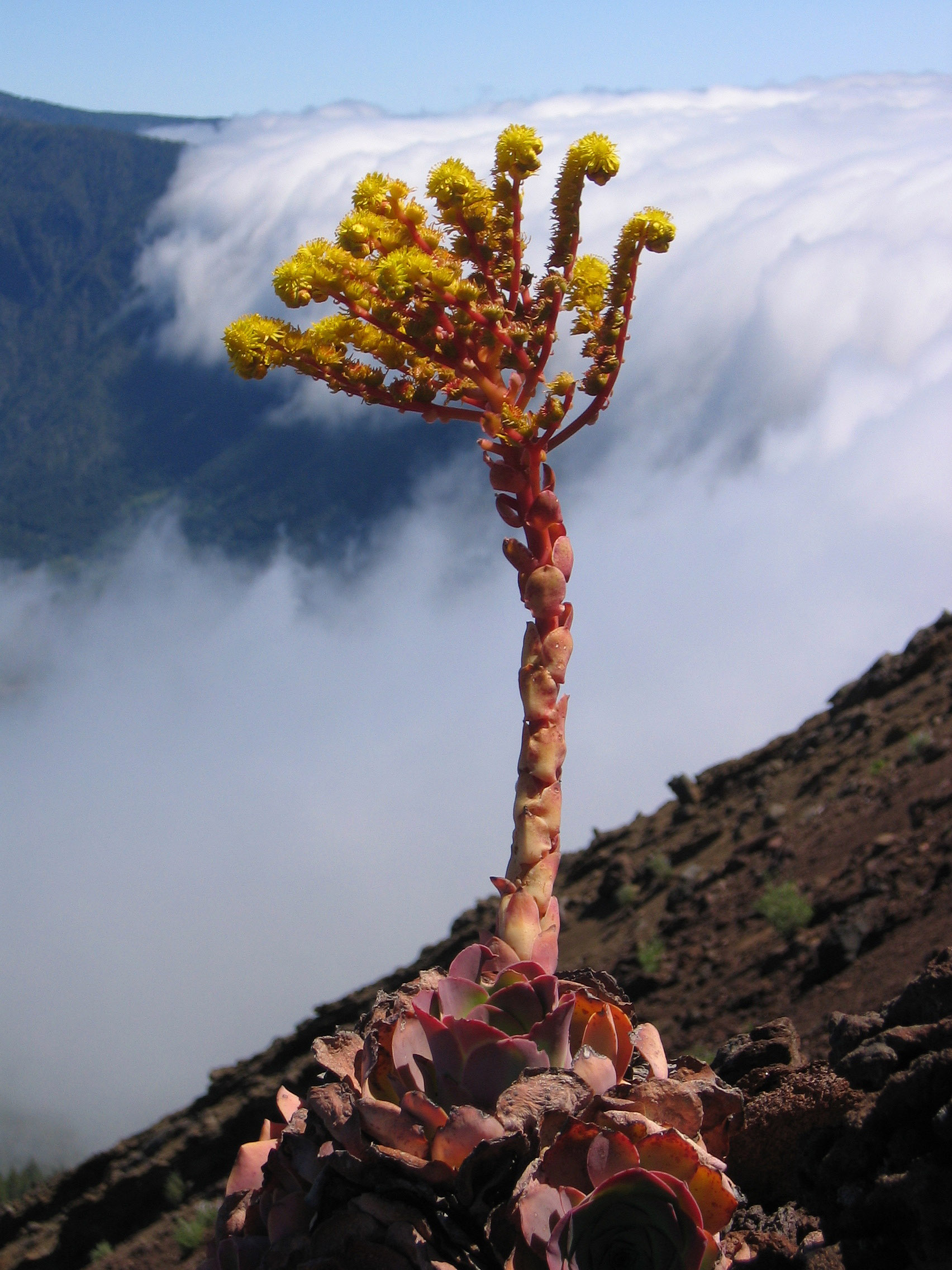
- In habitat, Pico Birigoyo, La Palma

Scientific classification
- Kingdom: Plantae
- Clade: Tracheophytes
- Clade: Angiosperms
- Clade: Eudicots
- Order: Saxifragales
- Family: Crassulaceae
- Genus: Aeonium
- Species: A. aureum

Binomial name
- Aeonium aureum (C.Sm. ex Hornem.) T.H.M.Mes

Synonyms
- Greenovia aurea (C.Sm. ex Hornem.) Webb & Berthel.; Sempervivum aureum C.Sm. ex Hornem.

= Aeonium aureum =

Species of succulent

Aeonium aureum (synonym Greenovia aurea) is a species of flowering plant in the Stonecrop Family (Crassulaceae), native to the Canary Islands (Tenerife, Gran Canaria, El Hierro, La Gomera and La Palma). It has very short stems, usually with several leaf rosettes. The grey-green leaves are tightly packed and fleshy. The bright yellow flowers are produced on leafy stems, and are up to 25 mm (1 in) across. These flowers are extraordinary in being 32-merous (trigintoduomerous) i.e. having usually 32 sepals, 32 petals, 32 stamens and an ovary of 32 carpels each organ class in single concentric whorls. It can have as few as 28 in a whorl to as many as 35, with 32 being the most common.

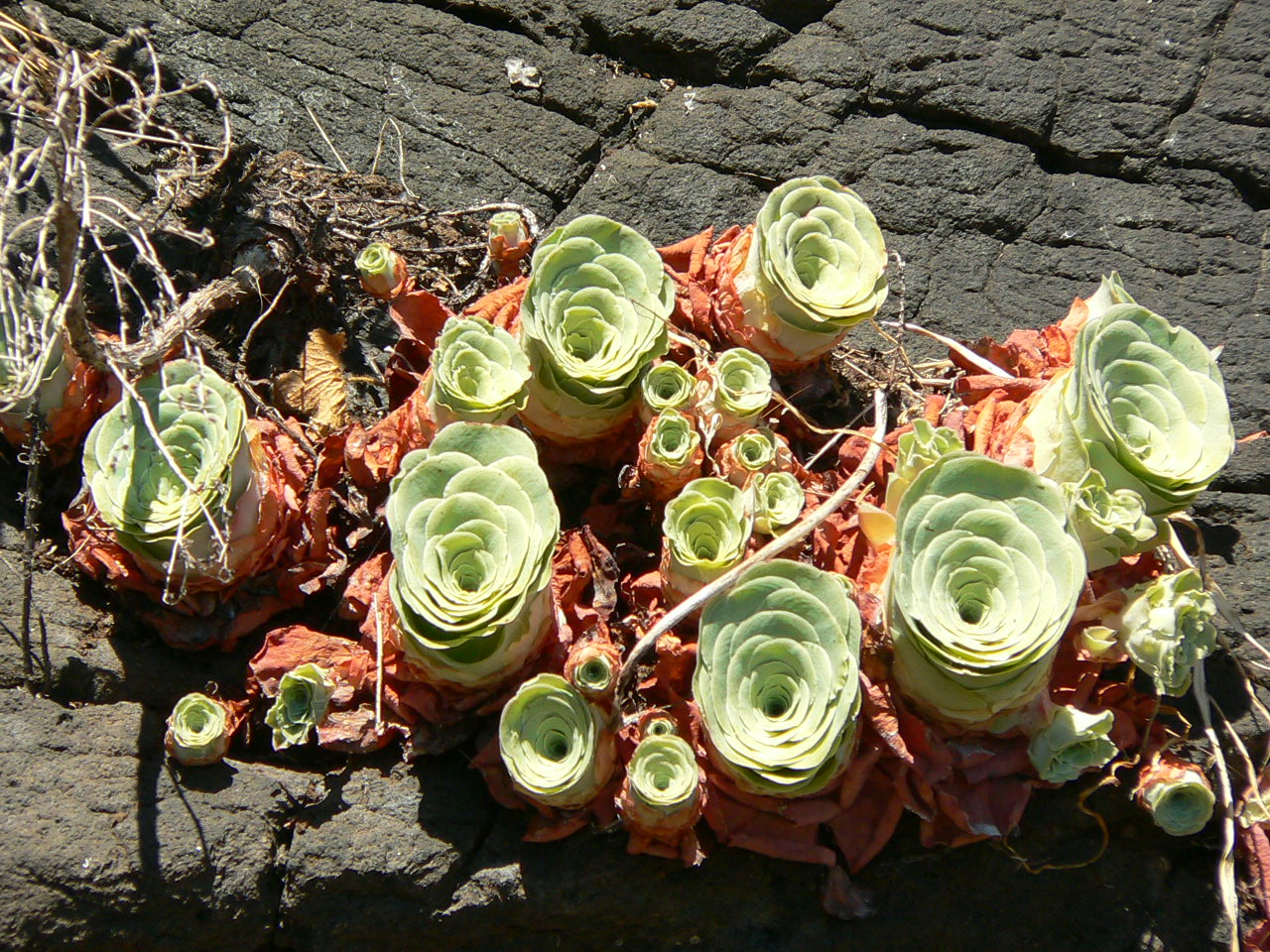
Leaf rosettes
