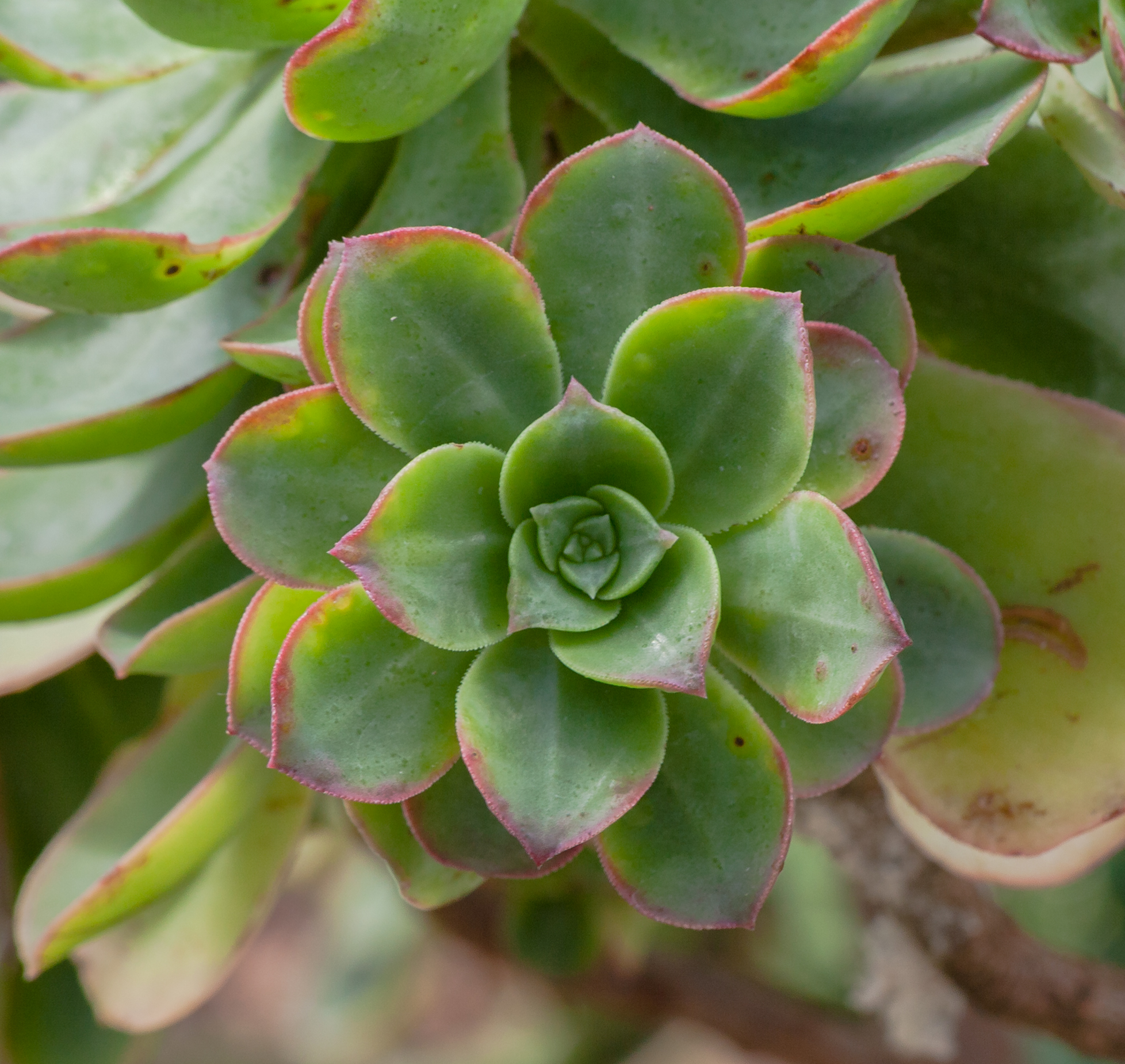
- Note pink brushing on leaf edges
- Leggy specimen at the Saint Petersburg Botanical Garden

Conservation status
- Endangered (IUCN 3.1)

Scientific classification
- Kingdom: Plantae
- Clade: Tracheophytes
- Clade: Angiosperms
- Clade: Eudicots
- Order: Saxifragales
- Family: Crassulaceae
- Genus: Aeonium
- Species: A. gomerense

Binomial name
- Aeonium gomerense (Praeger) Praeger

Synonyms
- Sempervivum gomerense Praeger

= Aeonium gomerense =

Species of plant

Aeonium gomerense is a species of flowering plant in the family Crassulaceae. It is native to east-central La Gomera island in the Canary Islands. A shrub reaching 1.5 m (5 ft), it is found in only four stations on rocky crags and slopes at elevations from 600 to 1,100 m (2,000 to 3,600 ft). With an estimated 4,672 adult individuals and under grazing pressure, it has been assessed as Endangered. It is occasionally available from commercial suppliers.
