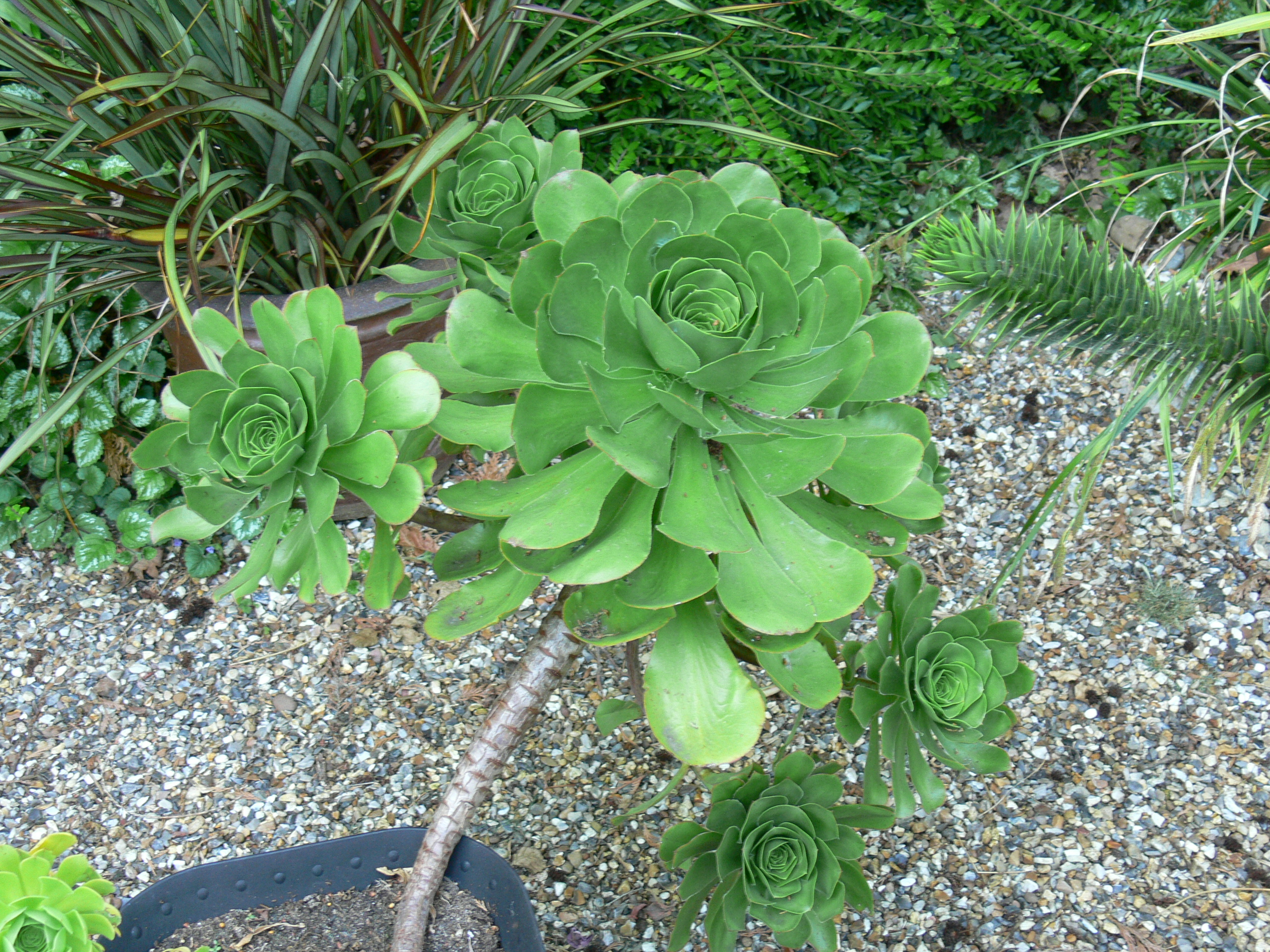

Scientific classification
- Kingdom: Plantae
- Clade: Tracheophytes
- Clade: Angiosperms
- Clade: Eudicots
- Order: Saxifragales
- Family: Crassulaceae
- Genus: Aeonium
- Species: A. ciliatum

Binomial name
- Aeonium ciliatum Webb & Berthel.

Synonyms
- Sempervivum ciliatum Willd.

= Aeonium ciliatum =

Species of succulent

Aeonium ciliatum is a species of flowering plant in the family Crassulaceae that produces large green leaf rosettes, which can be 50 centimetres (20 in) across. The rosettes emerge from a woody stem that branches freely and can become very top heavy. It is endemic to Tenerife in the Canary Islands, where it prefers some shade, and is frequent in the Anaga peninsula in the north east of the island.
