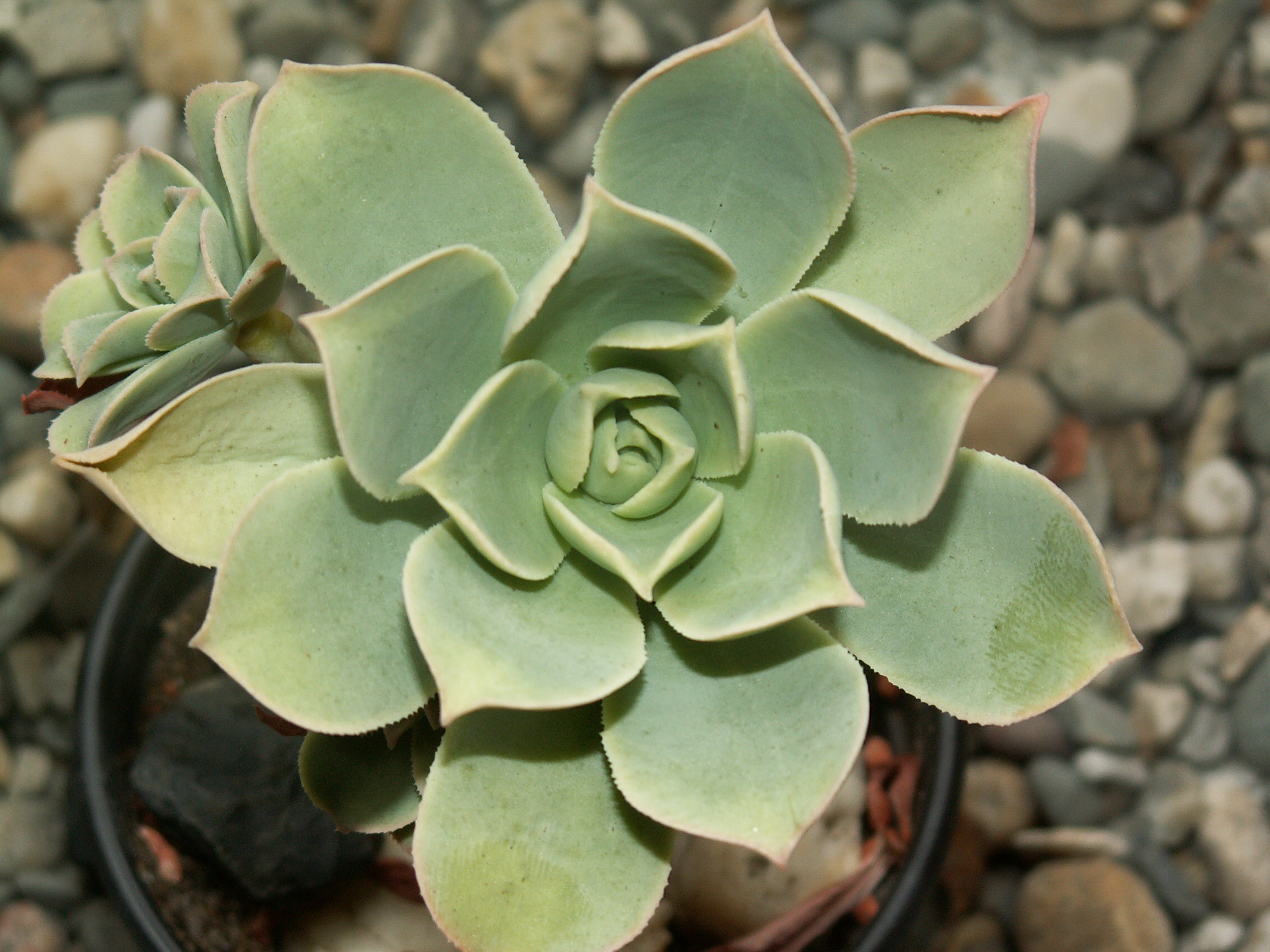

Scientific classification
- Kingdom: Plantae
- Clade: Tracheophytes
- Clade: Angiosperms
- Clade: Eudicots
- Order: Saxifragales
- Family: Crassulaceae
- Genus: Aeonium
- Species: A. lancerottense

Binomial name
- Aeonium lancerottense (Praeger) Praeger

Synonyms
- Sempervivum lancerottense Praeger

= Aeonium lancerottense =

Species of succulent

Aeonium lancerottense is a species of succulent flowering plant in the family Crassulaceae that is endemic to the island of Lanzarote in the Canary islands.
