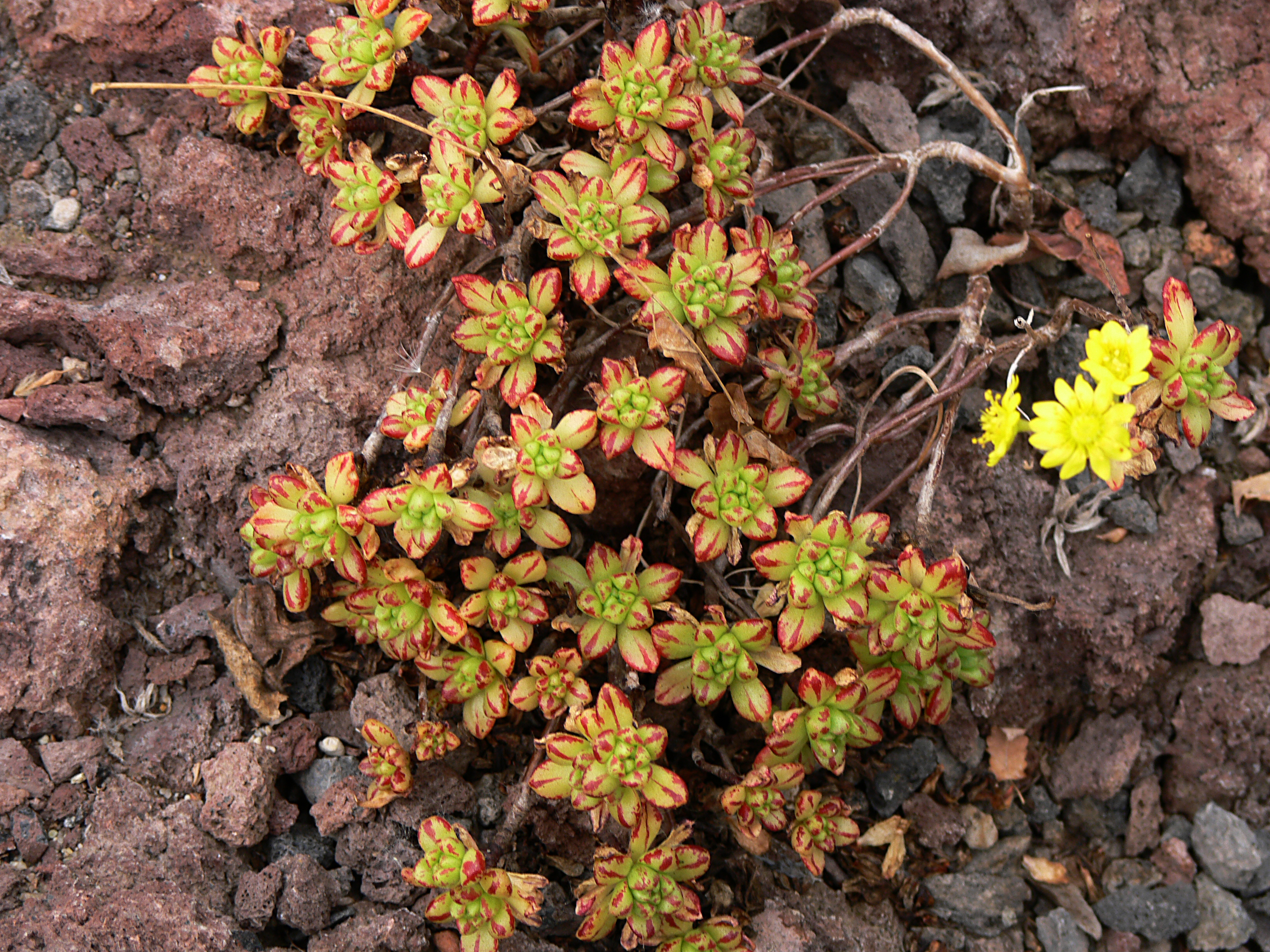

Scientific classification
- Kingdom: Plantae
- Clade: Tracheophytes
- Clade: Angiosperms
- Clade: Eudicots
- Order: Saxifragales
- Family: Crassulaceae
- Genus: Aeonium
- Species: A. sedifolium

Binomial name
- Aeonium sedifolium (Webb ex Bolle) Pit. & Proust

= Aeonium sedifolium =

Species of succulent

Aeonium sedifolium is a perennial flowering plant in the stonecrop family Crassulaceae. The plant is native to the western Canary Islands of Tenerife, La Gomera and La Palma.

== Description ==
Aeonium sedifolium is a perennial, herbaceous plant or small shrub with branched stems. The flower rosettes are small compared to most aeoniums, and consist of thick and fleshy oval shaped or a trowel shaped leaves. The young leaves look similar to the leaves of genus Sedum. The leaves are sticky and are initially green, but soon form red stripes on them.

Its inflorescence is a little bundle of small, golden yellow flowers that bloom from April to May.

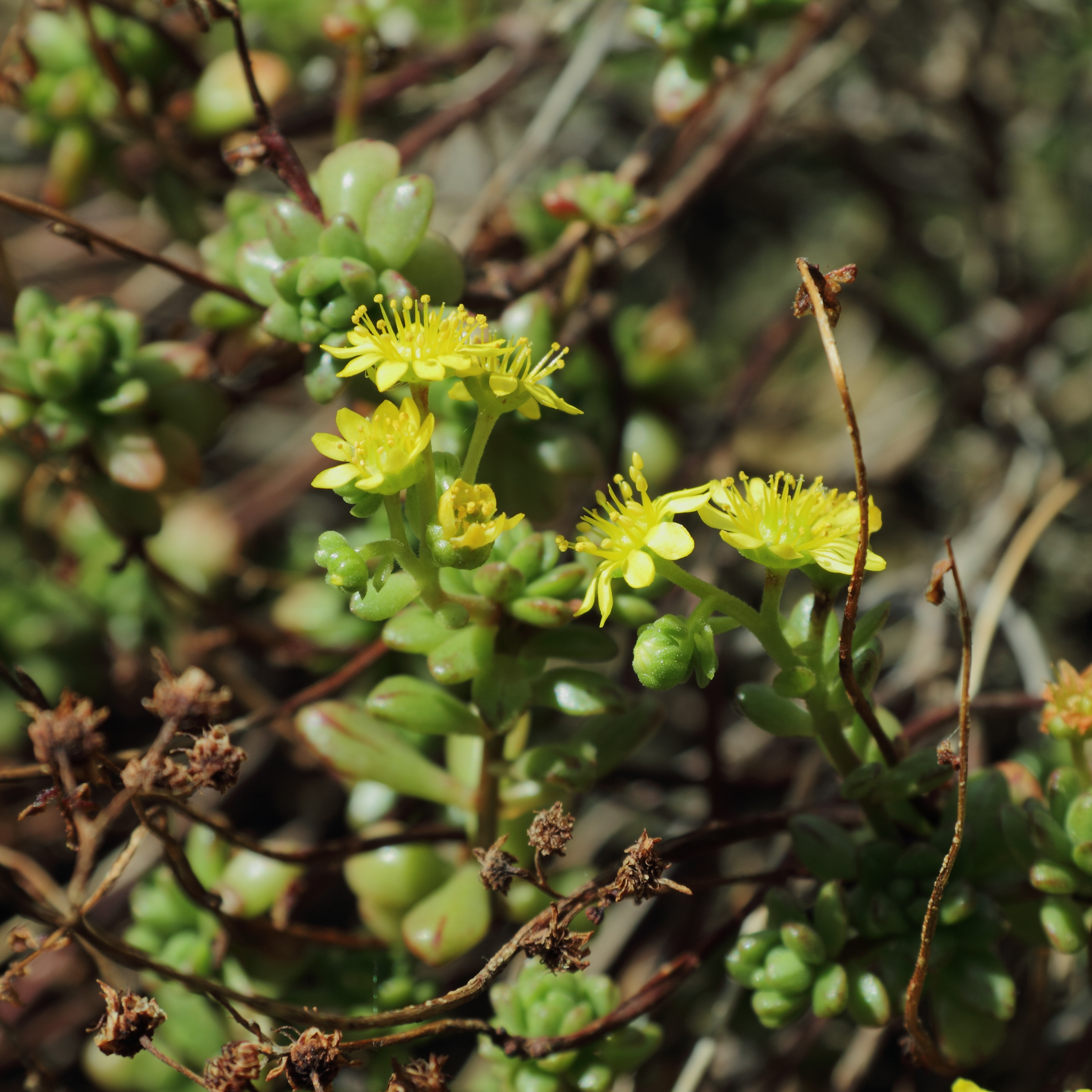
Aeonium sedifolium, detail bloemscherm

== Naming and etymology ==
The botanical name Aeonium comes from the ancient Greek word "aionios" (eternal), because it retains its leaves.

== Habitat and distribution ==
Aeonium sedifolium grows in full sun or partial shade on eroded volcanic soil. The plant is native to western Tenerife in the Canary Islands, the islands of La Palma and La Gomera.
