= List of endemic plants of the Canary Islands =

The Canary Islands are an archipelago in the North Atlantic Ocean, off the northwest coast of Africa. The Canary Islands are home to dozens of endemic species and subspecies of vascular plants, including the endemic genera Allagopappus, Bethencourtia, Dicheranthus, Gesnouinia, Gonospermum, Ixanthus, Parolinia, Pleiomeris, Rivasgodaya, Rutheopsis, Todaroa, and Vieraea. Although the Canary Islands are politically part of Spain, the World Geographical Scheme for Recording Plant Distributions treats the Canary Islands as distinct botanical country. The Canary Islands are part of Macaronesia, a biogeographical region which also includes the Azores, Cape Verde Islands, Madeira, and the Selvagens.

Plants are listed alphabetically by plant family. Extinct and presumed extinct species are indicated with †.

== Acanthaceae ==
- Justicia hyssopifolia L. – Tenerife and La Gomera

== Amaranthaceae ==
- Bosea yervamora L.
- Chenopodiastrum coronopus (Moq.) S.Fuentes, Uotila & Borsch
- Afrosalsola divaricata subsp. divaricata

== Amaryllidaceae ==
- Allium canariense (Regel) N.Friesen & P.Schönfelder
  - Allium canariense subsp. canariense
  - Allium canariense subsp. obtusitepalum (Svent.) N.Friesen & P.Schönfelder – I. Alegranza
- Narcissus tazetta subsp. canariensis (Burb.) Baker
- Pancratium canariense Ker Gawl.

== Apiaceae ==
- Athamanta cervariifolia (DC.) DC.
- Athamanta montana (Webb ex Christ) Spalik & Wojew. & S.R.Downie
- Bupleurum handiense (Bolle) G.Kunkel – Fuerteventura and Lanzarote
- Bupleurum salicifolium subsp. aciphyllum (Webb & Berthel.) Sunding & Kunkel
- Daucus elegans (Webb ex Bolle) Spalik, Banasiak & Reduron
- Ferula arnoldiana S.Scholz & Reyes-Bet. – southern La Palma
- Ferula communis subsp. linkii (Webb) Reduron & Dobignard
- Ferula lancerotensis Parl. – Lanzarote
- Ferula latipinna A.Santos
- Pimpinella anagodendron Bolle – Tenerife
- Pimpinella cumbrae Link – Tenerife
- Pimpinella dendroselinum Webb – La Palma and Tenerife
- Pimpinella junionae Ceballos & Ortuño – La Gomera
- Rutheopsis A.Hansen & G.Kunkel
  - Rutheopsis herbanica (Bolle) A.Hansen & G.Kunkel
  - Rutheopsis tortuosa (Webb & Berthel.) Frank., Reyes-Bet., Reduron & Spalik
- Todaroa Parl.
  - Todaroa aurea (Aiton) Parl.
    - Todaroa aurea subsp. aurea
    - Todaroa aurea subsp. suaveolens P.Pérez

== Apocynaceae ==
- Apteranthes burchardii subsp. burchardii – Fuerteventura, northern Lanzarote, Graciosa, Lobos, and Gran Canaria
- Ceropegia dichotoma Haw.
  - Ceropegia dichotoma subsp. dichotoma – La Palma and northern Tenerife
  - Ceropegia dichotoma subsp. krainzii (Svent.) P.Bruyns – La Gomera, Tenerife: near Adeje
- Ceropegia fusca Bolle – Gran Canaria and Tenerife

== Aquifoliaceae ==
- Ilex canariensis subsp. canariensis
- Ilex perado subsp. lopezlilloi (G.Kunkel) O.Erikss., A.Hansen & Sunding
- Ilex perado subsp. platyphylla (Webb & Berthel.) Tutin – Tenerife and La Gomera

== Araliaceae ==
- Hedera canariensis Willd.

== Arecaceae ==
- Phoenix canariensis H.Wildpret

== Asparagaceae ==
- Asparagus arborescens Willd. ex Schult. & Schult.f.
- Asparagus fallax Svent. – Tenerife: Vueltas de Taganana, and La Gomera
- Asparagus nesiotes subsp. purpuriensis Marrero Rodr. & A.Ramos – Lanzarote and Fuerteventura
- Asparagus plocamoides Webb ex Svent.
- Asparagus umbellatus var. flavescens Svent. – Gran Canaria
- Asparagus umbellatus subsp. umbellatus
- Autonoe berthelotii (Webb & Berthel.) Speta – Lanzarote and Fuerteventura
- Autonoe haemorrhoidalis (Webb & Berthel.) Speta
- Dracaena tamaranae Marrero Rodr., R.S.Almeida & Gonz.-Mart. – southwestern Gran Canaria
- Drimia hesperia (Webb & Berthel.) J.C.Manning & Goldblatt – Tenerife
- Semele gayae (Webb & Berthel.) Svent. & G.Kunkel – Gran Canaria

== Aspleniaceae ==
- Asplenium × chasmophilum Van den Heede & Viane (A. ceterach × A. octoploideum)
- Asplenium hemionitis var. longilobatum G.Kunkel – La Gomera
- Asplenium newmanii Bolle – La Palma
- Asplenium octoploideum Viane & Van den Heede
- Asplenium × tagananaense Rumsey (A. hemionitis × A. onopteris)
- Asplenium terorense G.Kunkel – Gran Canaria

== Asteraceae ==
- Allagopappus Cass.
  - Allagopappus canariensis (Willd.) Greuter
  - Allagopappus viscosissimus Bolle – Gran Canaria
- Andryala christii G.Kunkel
- Andryala perezii M.Z.Ferreira, R.Jardim, Alv.Fern. & M.Seq. – Fuerteventura and Lanzarote
- Andryala pinnatifida Aiton
  - Andryala pinnatifida subsp. latifolia (Bornm.) G.Kunkel – El Hierro and Tenerife
  - Andryala pinnatifida subsp. pinnatifida
  - Andryala pinnatifida subsp. preauxiana (Sch.Bip.) G.Kunkel – Gran Canaria
  - Andryala pinnatifida subsp. teydensis (Sch.Bip.) S.Rivas-Martínez et al. – Tenerife
- Andryala webbii (Christ) A.Santos – La Gomera, La Palma
- Argyranthemum adauctum (Link) Humphries
  - Argyranthemum adauctum subsp. adauctum – Tenerife
  - Argyranthemum adauctum subsp. canariense (Sch.Bip.) Humphries
  - Argyranthemum adauctum subsp. dugourii (Bolle) Humphries – Tenerife
  - Argyranthemum adauctum subsp. erythrocarpon (Svent.) Humphries – El Hierro
  - Argyranthemum adauctum subsp. gracile (Sch.Bip.) Humphries – Gran Canaria
  - Argyranthemum adauctum subsp. jacobaeifolium (Sch.Bip.) Humphries – Gran Canaria
  - Argyranthemum adauctum subsp. palmensis A.Santos – La Palma
- Argyranthemum broussonetii (Balb. ex Pers.) Humphries – northern Tenerife
- Argyranthemum callichrysum (Svent.) Humphries – La Gomera
  - Argyranthemum callichrysum subsp. callichrysum – La Gomera
  - Argyranthemum callichrysum subsp. gomerensis (Humphries) O.W.White – La Gomera
- Argyranthemum coronopifolium (Willd.) Humphries – Tenerife
- Argyranthemum escarrei (Svent.) Humphries – Gran Canaria
- Argyranthemum filifolium (Sch.Bip.) Humphries – Gran Canaria
- Argyranthemum foeniculaceum (Willd.) Webb ex Sch.Bip. – Tenerife
- Argyranthemum frutescens (L.) Sch.Bip.
  - Argyranthemum frutescens subsp. canariae (Christ) Humphries – Gran Canaria
  - Argyranthemum frutescens subsp. foeniculaceum (Pit.) Humphries – La Gomera
  - Argyranthemum frutescens subsp. frutescens
  - Argyranthemum frutescens subsp. gracilescens (Christ) Humphries – Tenerife
  - Argyranthemum frutescens subsp. parviflorum (Pit.) Humphries – La Gomera and Tenerife
  - Argyranthemum frutescens subsp. pumilum Humphries – Gran Canaria
  - Argyranthemum frutescens subsp. succulentum Humphries – Tenerife, El Hierro, and La Gomera
- Argyranthemum gracile Sch.Bip. – Tenerife
- Argyranthemum haouarytheum Humphries & Bramwell – La Palma
- Argyranthemum hierrense Humphries – El Hierro
- Argyranthemum lemsii Humphries – Tenerife
- Argyranthemum lidii Humphries – Gran Canaria
- Argyranthemum maderense (D.Don) Humphries – Lanzarote
- Argyranthemum sundingii L.Borgen – Tenerife
- Argyranthemum sventenii Humphries & Aldridge – El Hierro
- Argyranthemum tenerifae Humphries – Tenerife
- Argyranthemum webbii Sch.Bip. – La Palma
- Argyranthemum winteri (Svent.) Humphries – Fuerteventura
- Artemisia ramosa C.Sm. ex Link – Tenerife and Gran Canaria
- Artemisia thuscula Cav.
- Asteriscus graveolens subsp. stenophyllus (Link) Greuter – Gran Canaria
- Asteriscus intermedius (DC.) Pit. & Proust – Lanzarote and Fuerteventura
- Asteriscus sericeus (L.f.) DC.
- Atractylis arbuscula Svent. & Michaelis – Lanzarote
  - Atractylis arbuscula subsp. arbuscula – Lanzarote
  - Atractylis arbuscula subsp. schizogynophylla (Svent. & Kahne) Marrero Rodr. & Caujapé – Gran Canaria
- Atractylis preauxiana Sch.Bip. in P.B.Webb & S.Berthelot – Tenerife
- Bethencourtia Choisy
  - Bethencourtia hermosae (Pit.) G.Kunkel – La Gomera
  - Bethencourtia palmensis (C.Sm.) Choisy – Tenerife and La Palma
  - Bethencourtia rupicola (B.Nord.) B.Nord. – La Gomera
- Carduus baeocephalus Webb – Tenerife
  - Carduus baeocephalus subsp. baeocephalus – Tenerife
  - Carduus baeocephalus subsp. microstigma Gaisberg & Wagenitz – El Hierro
- Carduus bourgaei Kazmi – Fuerteventura
- Carduus clavulatus Link
- Carduus volutarioides Reyes-Bet. – Tenerife
- Carlina canariensis Pit. – Gran Canaria
  - Carlina canariensis var. canariensis – Gran Canaria
  - Carlina canariensis var. xeranthemiformis Meusel & A.Kástner – Gran Canaria
- Carlina falcata Svent. – La Palma and Tenerife
- Carlina salicifolia f. excedens G.Kunkel
- Carlina salicifolia var. gomerensis G.Kunkel
- Carlina salicifolia subsp. lancerottensis G.Kunkel – Lanzarote
- Carlina texedae Marrero Rodr. – Gran Canaria
- Carlina xeranthemoides L.f. – Tenerife
- Centaurea conocephala Bolle – Tenerife
- Cheirolophus arboreus (Webb & Berthel.) Holub – La Palma
- Cheirolophus arbutifolius (Svent.) G.Kunkel – Gran Canaria
- Cheirolophus burchardii Susanna – Tenerife
- Cheirolophus canariensis (Willd.) Holub – Tenerife
- Cheirolophus dariasii (Svent.) Bramwell – La Gomera
- Cheirolophus duranii (Burchard) Holub – El Hierro
- Cheirolophus falcisectus Svent. ex Montelongo & Moraleda – Gran Canaria
- Cheirolophus ghomerythus (Svent.) Holub – La Gomera
  - Cheirolophus ghomerythus var. ghomerythus – La Gomera
  - Cheirolophus ghomerythus var. integrifolius (Svent.) G.Kunkel – La Gomera
- Cheirolophus junonianus (Svent.) Holub – La Palma
  - Cheirolophus junonianus var. isoplexiphyllus (Svent.) G.Kunkel – La Palma
  - Cheirolophus junonianus var. junonianus – La Palma
- Cheirolophus metlesicsii V.M.Parada – Tenerife
- Cheirolophus santos-abreui A.Santos – La Palma
- Cheirolophus satarataensis (Svent.) Holub – La Gomera
- Cheirolophus sventenii (A.Santos) G.Kunkel – La Palma
  - Cheirolophus sventenii subsp. gracilis A.Santos – La Palma
  - Cheirolophus sventenii subsp. sventenii – La Palma
- Cheirolophus tagananensis (Svent.) Holub – Tenerife
- Cheirolophus teydis (C.Sm.) G.López – Tenerife
- Cheirolophus webbianus (Sch.Bip.) Holub – northeastern Tenerife
- Crepis canariensis (Sch.Bip.) Babc. ex Jenkins – Lanzarote, Fuerteventura, and Gran Canaria
- Gonospermum Less.
  - Gonospermum canariense (DC.) Less. El Hierro and La Palma
    - Gonospermum canariense subsp. canariense – La Palma
    - Gonospermum canariense subsp. elegans (DC.) Febles – El Hierro
  - Gonospermum ferulaceum (Webb) Febles – Gran Canaria
    - Gonospermum ferulaceum var. ferulaceum – Gran Canaria
    - Gonospermum ferulaceum var. latipinnum (Svent.) Febles – Gran Canaria
  - Gonospermum fruticosum Less.
  - Gonospermum gomerae Bolle – La Gomera
  - Gonospermum oshanahanii (Marrero Rodr., Febles & C.Suárez) Febles – Gran Canaria
  - Gonospermum ptarmiciflorum (Webb) Febles – Gran Canaria
  - Gonospermum revolutum (C.Sm.) Sch.Bip. – Tenerife
- Helichrysum alucense García-Cas. – La Gomera
- Helichrysum gossypinum Sch.Bip. – Lanzarote
- Helichrysum monogynum B.L.Burtt & Sunding – Lanzarote
- Helichrysum teydeum (Wildpret & Greuter) Raus – Tenerife
- Hypochaeris oligocephala (Svent. & Bramwell) Lack – Tenerife
- Ifloga obovata Bolle – Lanzarote, Fuerteventura, and Tenerife
- Kleinia neriifolia Haw.
- Lactuca palmensis Bolle – La Palma
- Onopordum carduelium Bolle – Gran Canaria
- Pericallis appendiculata (L.f.) B.Nord. – La Gomera, La Palma, and Tenerife
  - Pericallis appendiculata var. appendiculata – La Gomera, La Palma, and Tenerife
  - Pericallis appendiculata var. preauxiana (Sch.Bip.) G.Kunkel – Gran Canaria
- Pericallis cruenta Webb & Berthel. – La Gomera and Tenerife
- Pericallis echinata (L.f.) B.Nord. – Tenerife
- Pericallis hadrosoma (Svent.) B.Nord. – Gran Canaria: near Tenteniguada
- Pericallis hansenii (G.Kunkel) Sunding – La Gomera
- Pericallis × hybrida (Bosse) B.Nord. (P. cruenta × P. lanata) – Tenerife
- Pericallis lanata (L'Hér.) B.Nord. – Tenerife
  - Pericallis lanata var. cyanophthalma (Hook.) A.Hansen & Sunding – Tenerife
  - Pericallis lanata var. lanata – Tenerife
- Pericallis multiflora (L'Hér.) B.Nord. – Tenerife
- Pericallis murrayi (Bornm.) B.Nord. – El Hierro
- Pericallis papyracea (DC.) B.Nord. – La Palma
- Pericallis steetzii (Bolle) B.Nord. – La Gomera
- Pericallis tirmensis Marrero Rodr. & C.Santiago – Gran Canaria
- Pericallis tussilginis (L'Hér.) D.Don – Tenerife and Gran Canaria
- Pericallis webbii (Sch.Bip.) Bolle – Gran Canaria
- Phagnalon umbelliforme DC.
- Pulicaria canariensis Bolle – Fuerteventura and Lanzarote
- Reichardia × canariensis Gallego & Talavera (R. ligulata × R. tingitana) – Gran Canaria and Tenerife
- Reichardia crystallina (Sch.Bip.) Bramwell – Tenerife and Gran Canaria
- Reichardia famarae Bramwell & G.Kunkel – Lanzarote and Fuerteventura
- Reichardia ligulata (Vent.) G.Kunkel & Sunding
  - Reichardia ligulata var. crispa (Webb & Berthel.) Rivas Mart.
  - Reichardia ligulata var. ligulata
- Reichardia × sventenia Gallego & Talavera (R. famarae × R. tingitana) – Lanzarote and Fuerteventura
- Rhaponticum canariense DC. – Tenerife
- Schizogyne glaberrima DC. – Gran Canaria and Tenerife
- Schizogyne × intermedia G.Kunkel – (S. glaberrima × S. sericea) – Gran Canaria
- Senecio bollei Sunding & G.Kunkel – Fuerteventura
- Senecio ilsae A.Santos & Reyes-Bet. – La Gomera
- Senecio leucanthemifolius var. falcifolius (Bolle) G.Kunkel – Fuerteventura and Lanzarote
- Sonchus acaulis Dum.Cours. – Tenerife and Gran Canaria
- Sonchus arboreus (Brouss.) DC. – Tenerife and La Palma
- Sonchus × beltraniae U.Reifenb. & A.Reifenb. (S. hierrensis × S. wildpretii) – La Palma
- Sonchus bornmuelleri Pit. – La Palma
- Sonchus brachylobus Webb – Gran Canaria
- Sonchus bupleuroides (Font Quer) N.Kilian & Greuter – Gran Canaria
- Sonchus canariensis (Webb) Boulos – Gran Canaria and Tenerife
  - Sonchus canariensis subsp. canariensis – Gran Canaria and Tenerife
  - Sonchus canariensis subsp. orotavensis Boulos – Tenerife
- Sonchus capillaris Svent. – Gran Canaria and Tenerife
- Sonchus congestus Willd. – Tenerife and Gran Canaria
- Sonchus esperanzae N.Kilian & Greuter – La Palma
- Sonchus fauces-orci Knoche – Tenerife
- Sonchus gandogeri Pit. – El Hierro
- Sonchus gomeraensis Boulos – La Gomera
- Sonchus gummifer Link – Tenerife
- Sonchus heterophyllus (Boulos) U.Reifenb. & A.Reifenb. – La Gomera
- Sonchus hierrensis (Pit.) Boulos – La Palma, El Hierro, and La Gomera
- Sonchus × jaquiniocephalus Svent. (S. congestus × S. leptocephalus) – Tenerife
- Sonchus leptocephalus Cass.
- Sonchus lidii Boulos – El Hierro
- Sonchus × maynari Svent. – (S. congestus × S. fauces-orci) – Tenerife
- Sonchus microcarpus (Boulos) U.Reifenb. & A.Reifenb. – Tenerife
- Sonchus ortunoi Svent. – La Gomera
- Sonchus palmensis (Webb) Boulos – La Palma
- Sonchus pendulus (Sch.Bip.) Sennikov – Gran Canaria
  - Sonchus pendulus subsp. flaccidus (Svent.) N.Kilian & Greuter – Gran Canaria
  - Sonchus pendulus subsp. pendulus – Gran Canaria
- Sonchus pinnatifidus var. integrifolius G.Kunkel
- Sonchus pitardii Boulos – El Hierro
- Sonchus platylepis Webb & Berthel. – Gran Canaria
- Sonchus radicatus Aiton – Tenerife
- Sonchus regis-jubae Pit.
- Sonchus × rupicola (Svent.) A.Santos & Mejías (S. bupleuroides × S. pendulus) – Gran Canaria
- Sonchus sventenii U.Reifenb. & A.Reifenb. – La Gomera
- Sonchus tectifolius Svent. – Tenerife
- Sonchus tuberifer Svent. – Tenerife
- Sonchus webbii Sch.Bip.
- Sonchus wildpretii U.Reifenb. & A.Reifenb. – La Gomera
- Taraxacum canarense Soest La Gomera and Tenerife
- Taraxacum guanchicum A.Galán, E.Linares & Vicente Orell. – Gran Canaria
- Tolpis calderae Bolle – La Palma
- Tolpis coronopifolia (Desf.) Biv.
- Tolpis crassiuscula Svent. – Tenerife
- Tolpis glabrescens Kämmer – Tenerife
- Tolpis laciniata Webb
- Tolpis lagopoda C.Sm. ex Link
- Tolpis proustii Pit. – La Gomera and El Hierro
- Tolpis santosii D.J.Crawford, Mort & J.K.Archibald – La Palma
- Tolpis webbii Sch.Bip. in P.B.Webb & S.Berthelot – Tenerife
- Vieraea Webb ex Sch.Bip.
  - Vieraea laevigata (Willd.) Webb – Tenerife
- Volutaria bollei (Sch.Bip. ex Bolle) A.Hansen & G.Kunkel – Lanzarote and Fuerteventura
- Volutaria canariensis Wagenitz

== Boraginaceae ==
- Echium acanthocarpum Svent. – La Gomera
- Echium aculeatum Poir. – western and southwestern Tenerife, La Gomera, and El Hierro
- Echium auberianum Webb & Berthel. – central Tenerife
- Echium × bailaderense A.A.Weller (E. leucophaeum × E. strictum) – Tenerife
- Echium bethencourtii A.Santos – La Palma
- Echium × bond-spraguei Sprague & Hutch. (E. brevirame × E. webbii) – western La Palma
- Echium bonnetii Coincy
- Echium brevirame Sprague & Hutch – La Palma
- Echium callithyrsum Webb ex Bolle – Gran Canaria
- Echium decaisnei Webb & Berthel. – Gran Canaria
  - Echium decaisnei subsp. decaisnei – Gran Canaria
  - Echium decaisnei subsp. purpuriense Bramwell – Lanzarote and Fuerteventura
- Echium giganteum L.f. – northern Tenerife
- Echium handiense Svent. – Fuerteventura: Pico de la Zarza
- Echium hierrense Webb ex Bolle – El Hierro
- Echium × lemsii G.Kunkel (E. decaisnei × E. strictum) – Gran Canaria
- Echium leucophaeum (Webb ex Christ) Webb ex Sprague & Hutch. – southern Tenerife
- Echium × lidii G.Kunkel (E. decaisnei × E. virescens)
- Echium onosmifolium Webb & Berthel. – southern and southwestern Gran Canaria
  - Echium onosmifolium subsp. onosmifolium – southern and southwestern Gran Canaria
  - Echium onosmifolium subsp. spectabile G.Kunkel – southern Gran Canaria
- Echium perezii Sprague – central La Palma
- Echium pitardii A.Chev. – Lanzarote
- Echium simplex DC. – northern Tenerife
- Echium strictum L.f.
  - Echium strictum subsp. exasperatum (Webb ex Coincy) Bramwell – northwestern Tenerife
  - Echium strictum subsp. gomerae (Pit.) Bramwell – La Gomera
  - Echium strictum subsp. strictum
- Echium sventenii Bramwell – Tenerife: east of Adeje
- Echium × taibiquense P.Wolff & Rosinski – (E. aculeatum × E. hierrense)
- Echium thyrsiflorum Masson ex Link – La Palma
- Echium triste Svent. – Gran Canaria
  - Echium triste var. gomeraeum Svent. – southwestern La Gomera
  - Echium triste subsp. nivariense (Svent.) Bramwell – Tenerife
  - Echium triste subsp. triste – Gran Canaria
- Echium virescens DC. – Tenerife
- Echium webbii Coincy – La Palma
- Echium wildpretii H.Pearson ex Hook.f. – central Tenerife
- Heliotropium messerschmidioides Kuntze
- Myosotis latifolia Poir

== Brassicaceae ==
- Brassica bourgeaui (Webb ex Christ) Kuntze
- Crambe arborea Webb ex Christ – eastern Tenerife
- Crambe feuilleei A.Santos ex Prina & Mart.-Laborde
- Crambe gigantea (Ceballos & Ortuño) Bramwell – northern La Palma
- Crambe gomeraea Webb ex Christ – La Gomera
  - Crambe gomeraea subsp. gomeraea – La Gomera
  - Crambe gomeraea subsp. hirsuta Prina – La Gomera
- Crambe laevigata DC. ex Christ – western Tenerife
- Crambe microcarpa A.Santos – La Palma
- Crambe pritzelii Bolle – Gran Canaria
- Crambe scaberrima Webb ex Bramwell – western Tenerife
- Crambe scoparia Svent. – Tenerife and western Gran Canaria
- Crambe strigosa L'Hér.
- Crambe sventenii Pett. ex Bramwell & Sunding – southern Fuerteventura
- Crambe tamadabensis Prina & Marrero Rodr. – northwestern Gran Canaria
- Crambe wildpretii Prina & Bramwell – northwestern La Gomera
- Descurainia artemisioides Svent. – Gran Canaria
- Descurainia bourgaeana (E.Fourn.) Webb ex O.E.Schulz – Tenerife
- Descurainia gilva Svent. – La Palma
- Descurainia gonzalezii Svent. – Tenerife
- Descurainia lemsii Bramwell – Tenerife
- Descurainia millefolia (Jacq.) Webb & Berthel.
- Descurainia preauxiana (Webb) Webb ex O.E.Schulz – Gran Canaria
- Erucastrum canariense Webb & Berthel.
- Erucastrum cardaminoides (Webb ex Christ) O.E.Schulz
- Erysimum scoparium (Brouss. ex Willd.) Wettst. – Tenerife, Gran Canaria, and north-central La Palma
  - Erysimum scoparium var. lindleyi (Webb ex Christ) G.Kunkel
  - Erysimum scoparium var. scoparium – Tenerife, Gran Canaria, and north-central La Palma
- Erysimum virescens (Webb ex Christ) Wettst.
- Lobularia canariensis subsp. canariensis
- Lobularia canariensis subsp. intermedia (Webb) L.Borgen
- Lobularia canariensis subsp. microsperma L.Borgen
- Lobularia canariensis subsp. palmensis (Webb ex Christ) L.Borgen – La Palma
- Matthiola bolleana subsp. bolleana – Fuerteventura
- Matthiola bolleana subsp. morocera (Christ) Reyes-Bet. – Gran Canaria
- Parolinia Webb
  - Parolinia filifolia G.Kunkel
  - Parolinia glabriuscula Montelongo & Bramwell
  - Parolinia intermedia Svent. & Bramwell – Tenerife
  - Parolinia ornata Webb – Gran Canaria
  - Parolinia platypetala G.Kunkel
  - Parolinia schizogynoides Svent. – La Gomera

== Campanulaceae ==
- Campanula occidentalis Y.Nyman
- Canarina canariensis (L.) Vatke

== Caprifoliaceae ==
- Pterocephalus dumetorum (Brouss. ex Willd.) Coult. – Tenerife and Gran Canaria
- Pterocephalus lasiospermus Link – Tenerife
- Pterocephalus porphyranthus Svent. – La Palma
- Pterocephalus virens Webb & Berthel. – northern Tenerife

== Caryophyllaceae ==
- Bufonia calderae Chrtek & Křísa – Gran Canaria
- Bufonia paniculata subsp. teneriffae (Christ) Kunkel – Tenerife
- Cerastium sventenii Jalas – La Palma
- Dicheranthus Webb
  - Dicheranthus plocamoides Webb – La Gomera and Tenerife
- Herniaria canariensis Chaudhri – Tenerife
- Paronychia canariensis (L.f.) Link
- Paronychia capitata subsp. canariensis (Chaudhri) Sunding
- Polycarpaea aristata (Aiton) C.Sm. ex DC. – Tenerife and Gran Canaria
- Polycarpaea carnosa C.Sm. ex Buch – Tenerife and La Gomera
- Polycarpaea filifolia Webb ex Christ – Tenerife and La Gomera
- Polycarpaea latifolia (Willd.) Poir. – Tenerife and La Gomera
- Polycarpaea robusta (Pit.) G.Kunkel
- Polycarpaea smithii Link – La Palma
- Polycarpaea tenuis Webb ex Christ – Tenerife
- Silene berthelotiana Webb ex Christ – Tenerife
- Silene bourgaei Webb ex Christ – northern La Gomera
- Silene canariensis Spreng.
- Silene lagunensis C.Sm. ex Link – northern Tenerife
- Silene nocteolens Webb & Berthel. – Tenerife
- Silene pogonocalyx (Svent.) Bramwell – La Palma
- Silene sabinosae Pit. – El Hierro
- Silene tamaranae Bramwell
- Spergularia bourgaei Lebel

== Celastraceae ==
- Gymnosporia cassinoides (L'Hér.) Masf.
- Gymnosporia cryptopetala Reyes-Bet. & A.Santos – Lanzarote and Fuerteventura

== Cistaceae ==
- Cistus asper Demoly & R.Mesa – El Hierro
- Cistus × banaresii Demoly (C. palmensis × C. symphytifolius) – La Palma
- Cistus chinamadensis Bañares & P.Romero
  - Cistus chinamadensis subsp. chinamadensis
  - Cistus chinamadensis subsp. gomerae Bañares & P.Romero
  - Cistus chinamadensis subsp. ombriosus Demoly & M.Marrero – El Hierro
- Cistus grancanariae Marrero Rodr., R.S.Almeida & C.Ríos – Gran Canaria
- Cistus horrens Demoly
- Cistus ocreatus C.Sm.
- Cistus osbeckiifolius Christ – Tenerife
  - Cistus osbeckiifolius subsp. osbeckiifolius – Tenerife
  - Cistus osbeckiifolius subsp. tomentosus Bañares & Demoly – Tenerife
- Cistus palmensis Bañares & Demoly – La Palma
- Cistus symphytifolius Lam.
- Helianthemum aganae Marrero Rodr. & R.Mesa – northeastern La Gomera
- Helianthemum aguloi Marrero Rodr. & R.Mesa – northwestern La Gomera
- Helianthemum bramwelliorum Marrero Rodr.
- Helianthemum broussonetii Dunal
- Helianthemum bystropogophyllum Svent. – western Gran Canaria
- Helianthemum cirae A.Santos – central La Palma
- Helianthemum gonzalezferreri Marrero Rodr.
- Helianthemum henriquezii Rebolé, A.Acev.-Rodr. & García García – Tenerife
- Helianthemum inaguae Marrero Rodr., Gonz.-Mart. & F.González
- Helianthemum juliae Wildpret
- Helianthemum linii A.Santos – La Palma
- Helianthemum teneriffae Coss. – Tenerife: Ladera de Guimar
- Helianthemum tholiforme Bramwell, J.Ortega & B.Navarro
- Helianthemum thymiphyllum Svent. – Lanzarote and Fuerteventura

== Colchicaceae ==
- Colchicum hierrense (A.Santos) J.C.Manning & Vinn. – El Hierro
- Colchicum psammophilum (Svent.) J.C.Manning & Vinn. – northwestern Lanzarote and northern Fuerteventura

== Convolvulaceae ==
- Convolvulus canariensis L.
- Convolvulus caput-medusae Lowe – Gran Canaria, Fuerteventura, and Lanzarote
- Convolvulus × despreauxii A.Santos & Carine (C. scoparius × C. floridus)
- Convolvulus floridus L.f.
- Convolvulus fruticulosus Desr.
  - Convolvulus fruticulosus subsp. fruticulosus – Tenerife and La Gomera
  - Convolvulus fruticulosus subsp. glandulosus (Webb) J.R.I.Wood & Scotland – Gran Canaria and La Palma
- Convolvulus lopezsocasii Svent. – Lanzarote
- Convolvulus scoparius L.f.
- Convolvulus volubilis Brouss. ex Link – Tenerife and La Gomera

== Crassulaceae ==
- Aeonium × acebesii O.Arango (A. cuneatum × A. urbicum) – Tenerife
- Aeonium × afurense Arango – Tenerife
- Aeonium × aguajilvense Bañares (A. castello-paivae × A. gomerense) – La Gomera
- Aeonium aizoon (Bolle) T.H.M.Mes – central and southern Tenerife
- Aeonium × anagense P.V.Heath (A. lindleyi × A. tabulaeforme) – Tenerife
- Aeonium appendiculatum Bañares – La Gomera
- Aeonium arboreum subsp. arboreum – northern and central Gran Canaria
- Aeonium arboreum subsp. holochrysum (H.Y.Liu) Bañares
- Aeonium aureum (C.Sm. ex Hornem.) T.H.M.Mes
- Aeonium balsamiferum Webb & Berthel. – northern and central Lanzarote
- Aeonium × beltranii Bañares (A. decorum × A. canariense subsp. latifolium) – La Gomera
- Aeonium × bollei G.Kunkel (A. percarneum × A. undulatum) – Gran Canaria
- Aeonium × burchardii (Praeger) Praeger (A. pseudourbicum × A. sedifolium) – Tenerife
- Aeonium × cabrerae Bañares (A. diplocyclum × A. spathulatum)
- Aeonium canariense (L.) Webb & Berthel.
  - Aeonium canariense subsp. canariense – Tenerife
  - Aeonium canariense subsp. christii (Praeger) Bañares – La Palma
  - Aeonium canariense subsp. latifolium (Burchard) Bañares – La Gomera
  - Aeonium canariense subsp. longithyrsum (Burchard) Cristini – northern El Hierro
  - Aeonium canariense subsp. virgineum (Webb ex Christ) Bañares – northern and northwestern Gran Canaria
- Aeonium castello-paivae Bolle – La Gomera
- Aeonium × castellodecorum Bañares (A. castello-paivae × A. decorum) – La Gomera
- Aeonium × chamorgense Arango (A. liui × A. volkeri) – Tenerife
- Aeonium ciliatum (Willd.) Webb & Berthel. – Tenerife
- Aeonium × cilifolium Bañares – (A. ciliatum × A. sedifolium) – Tenerife
- Aeonium × claperae Arango (A. spathulatum × A. urbicum) – Tenerife
- Aeonium × condei O.Arango (A. haworthii subsp. volkeri × A. urbicum) – Tenerife
- Aeonium × contortiflorum O.Arango (A. haworthii subsp. volkeri × A. lindleyi) – Tenerife
- Aeonium cuneatum Webb & Berthel. – Tenerife
- Aeonium davidbramwellii H.Y.Liu – La Palma
- Aeonium decorum Webb ex Bolle – La Gomera and northeastern Tenerife
- Aeonium dodrantale (Willd.) T.H.M.Mes – Tenerife
  - Aeonium dodrantale subsp. dodrantale – northeastern Tenerife
  - Aeonium dodrantale subsp. millennium (O.Arango) Cristini – northwestern Tenerife
- Aeonium × edgari P.V.Heath (A. canariense subsp. christii × A. valverdense) – El Hierro
- Aeonium × exsul Bornm. ex Arango (A. canariense × A. ciliatum) – Tenerife
- Aeonium × globosum O.Arango (A. canariense subsp. christii × A. spathulatum) – La Palma
- Aeonium gomerense (Praeger) Praeger – east-central La Gomera
- Aeonium goochiae Webb & Berthel. – La Palma
- Aeonium × grandipetalum Bañares (A. canariense subsp. christii × A. davidbramwellii) – La Palma
- Aeonium haworthii Webb & Berthel. – Tenerife
  - Aeonium haworthii subsp. haworthii – Tenerife
  - Aeonium haworthii subsp. volkeri (E.Hern. & Bañares) Cristini – northeastern Tenerife
- Aeonium × hernandezii Bañares (A. canariense × A. haworthii subsp. volkeri) – Tenerife
- Aeonium hierrense (R.P.Murray) Pit. & Proust – northeastern El Hierro
- Aeonium × holospathulatum Bañares (A. arboreum subsp. holochrysum × A. spathulatum)
- Aeonium × hybridum (Haw.) G.D.Rowley (A. simsii × A. spathulatum) – Gran Canaria
- Aeonium × isorense Bañares (A. arboreum subsp. holochrysum × A. hierrense) – El Hierro
- Aeonium × lambii Voggenr. ex Bañares (A. aureum × A. spathulatum)
- Aeonium lancerottense (Praeger) Praeger – northern and central Lanzarote
- Aeonium × laxiflorum (Macarrón & Bañares) Bañares (A. decorum × A. diplocyclum) – La Gomera
- Aeonium × lemsii G.Kunkel (A. canariense subsp. virgineum × A. percarneum) – Gran Canaria
- Aeonium × lidii Sunding & Kunkel (A. percarneum × A. simsii) – Gran Canaria
- Aeonium lindleyi Webb & Berthel. – La Gomera and northeastern Tenerife
  - Aeonium lindleyi subsp. lindleyi – northeastern Tenerife
  - Aeonium lindleyi subsp. viscatum (Bolle) Bañares – La Gomera
- Aeonium liui O.Arango – Tenerife
- Aeonium × loartei Tavorm. (A. sedifolium × A. spathulatum)
- Aeonium × marreroi Arango (A. canariense subsp. virgineum × A. undulatum) – Gran Canaria
- † Aeonium × mascaense Bramwell (A. decorum × A. haworthii) – northeastern Tenerife
- Aeonium × meridionale Bañares (A. davidbramwellii × A. spathulatum) – La Palma
- Aeonium × mixtum P.V.Heath (A. haworthii × A. urbicum) – Tenerife
- Aeonium × monteaquaense Arango (A. haworthii × A. tabulaeforme) – Tenerife
- Aeonium nobile (Praeger) Praeger – La Palma
- Aeonium × nogalesii Bañares (A. canariense subsp. christii × A. sedifolium) – La Palma
- Aeonium × occidentale Bañares (A. goochiae × A. sedifolium) – La Palma
- Aeonium × ombriosum P.V.Heath (A. hierrense × A. valverdense) – El Hierro
- Aeonium × orbelindense Bañares (A. canariense × A. urbicum) – Tenerife
- Aeonium percarneum (R.P.Murray) Pit. & Proust – northern and central Gran Canaria
- Aeonium × perezii Bañares (A. decorum × A. urbicum) – Tenerife
- Aeonium × praegeri G.Kunkel (A. caespitosum × A. undulatum) – Gran Canaria
- Aeonium × puberulum Bañares & A.Acev.-Rodr. (A. decorum × A. sedifolium) – La Gomera
- Aeonium × riosjordanae (Bañares) Bañares (A. aureum × A. simsii) – Gran Canaria
- Aeonium × robustum Bañares (A. davidbramwellii × A. nobile) – La Palma
- Aeonium rubrolineatum Svent. – La Gomera
- Aeonium × sanchezii Bañares (A. rubrolineatum × A. spathulatum) – La Gomera
- Aeonium saundersii Bolle – central La Gomera
- Aeonium sedifolium (Webb ex Bolle) Pit. & Proust – Tenerife, La Palma, and La Gomera
- Aeonium × septentrionale Bañares & C.Ríos (A. aureum × A. undulatum) – Gran Canaria
- Aeonium simsii (Sweet) Stearn – central and south-central Gran Canaria
- Aeonium smithii (Sims) Webb & Berthel. – southern Tenerife
- Aeonium spathulatum (Hornem.) Praeger
- Aeonium × splendens Bramwell & G.D.Rowley (A. cilatum × A. nobile) – La Palma
- Aeonium × sventenii G.Kunkel (A. arboreum × A. simsii) – Gran Canaria
- Aeonium tabulaeforme (Haw.) Webb & Berthel. – northern Tenerife
- Aeonium × tagananense O.Arango (A. ciliatum × A. tabulaeforme) – Tenerife
- Aeonium × tamaimense Bañares (A. sedifolium × A. urbicum) – Tenerife
- Aeonium × teneriffae Bramwell & G.D.Rowley (A. ciliatum × A. urbicum) – Tenerife
- Aeonium × tijarafense A.Santos ex Bañares (A. davidbramwellii × A. diplocyclum) – La Palma
- Aeonium × timense Bañares & Macarrón (A. canariense subsp. christii × A. nobile) – La Palma
- Aeonium × uhlii Tavorm. & S.Tavorm. (A. aureum × A. diplocyclum) – El Hierro
- Aeonium undulatum Webb & Berthel. – northwestern and northern Gran Canaria
- Aeonium urbicum (C.Sm. ex Hornem.) Webb & Berthel. – Tenerife
- Aeonium × uriostei O.Arango (A. aizoon × A. spathulatum) – Tenerife
- Aeonium valverdense (Praeger) Praeger – eastern El Hierro
- Aeonium × velutinum (N.E.Br.) Praeger (A. canariense × A. simsii) – Gran Canaria
- Aeonium × wildpretii Bañares (A. arboreum × A. canariense)
  - Aeonium × wildpretii nothosubsp. jinamense Cristini (A. arboreum subsp. holochrysum × A. canariense subsp. longithyrsum) – El Hierro
  - Aeonium × wildpretii nothosubsp. wildpretii (A. arboreum subsp. holochrysum × A. canariense subsp. christii) – La Palma and El Hierro
- Aichryson × aizoides (Lam.) E.C.Nelson (A. punctatum × A. tortuosum)
- Aichryson × azuajei Bañares (A. laxum × A. porphyrogennetos)
- Aichryson bituminosum Bañares
- Aichryson bollei Webb ex Bolle – La Palma
- Aichryson × bramwellii G.Kunkel (A. porphyrogennetos × A. punctatus)
- Aichryson brevipetalum Praeger (central and eastern La Palma
- Aichryson × buchii Bañares (A. bollei × A. pachycaulon subsp. parviflorum) – La Palma
- Aichryson × cumbrense Bañares (A. bollei × A. laxum) – La Palma
- Aichryson dichotomum (DC.) Webb & Berthel.
- Aichryson laxum (Haw.) Bramwell
  - Aichryson laxum subsp. latipetalum (Bañares & M.Marrero) Bañares – Tenerife
  - Aichryson laxum subsp. laxum
- Aichryson pachycaulon Bolle
  - Aichryson pachycaulon subsp. gonzalezhernandezii (G.Kunkel) Bramwell – La Gomera
  - Aichryson pachycaulon subsp. immaculatum (Webb ex Christ) Bramwell – Tenerife
  - Aichryson pachycaulon subsp. pachycaulon – southern Fuerteventura
  - Aichryson pachycaulon subsp. parviflorum (Bolle) Bramwell – northwestern La Palma
  - Aichryson pachycaulon subsp. praetermissum Bramwell – northwestern Gran Canaria
- Aichryson palmense Webb ex Bolle – La Palma
- Aichryson parlatorei Bolle
- Aichryson porphyrogennetos Bolle – eastern and northeastern Gran Canaria
- Aichryson × praegeri G.Kunkel (A. laxum × A. porphyrogennetos)
- Aichryson punctatum (C.Sm. ex Link) Webb & Berthel.
- Aichryson roseum Bañares
- Aichryson tortuosum (Aiton) Webb & Berthel. – eastern Canary Islands
  - Aichryson tortuosum subsp. bethencourtianum (Bolle) Bañares – northern and central Fuerteventura
  - Aichryson tortuosum subsp. tortuosum – Lanzarote
- Monanthes anagensis Praeger – Tenerife
- Monanthes brachycaulos (Webb & Berthel.) Lowe
- Monanthes dasyphylla Svent. – Tenerife
- Monanthes × filifolia Bañares (M. anagensis × M. brachycaulos)
- Monanthes icterica (Webb ex Bolle) Christ – Tenerife and La Gomera
- Monanthes laxiflora (DC.) Bolle
- Monanthes minima (Bolle) Christ – Tenerife
  - Monanthes minima subsp. adenoscepes (Svent.) Bañares – Tenerife
  - Monanthes minima subsp. minima – Tenerife
- Monanthes muralis (Webb ex Bolle) Hook.f.
- Monanthes niphophila Svent. – Tenerife
- Monanthes pallens (Webb ex Christ) Christ – Tenerife, La Gomera, and El Hierro
- Monanthes polyphylla Haw.
  - Monanthes polyphylla subsp. amydros (Svent.) Nyffeler – La Gomera
  - Monanthes polyphylla subsp. polyphylla
- Monanthes praegeri Bramwell – Tenerife
- Monanthes purpurascens (Bolle & Webb) Christ
- Monanthes silensis (Praeger) Svent. – Tenerife
- Monanthes subcrassicaulis (Kuntze) Praeger – Tenerife and La Palma
- Monanthes × subglabrata Bañares (M. brachycaulos × M. minima)
- Monanthes subrosulata Bañares & A.Acev.-Rodr. – southern and southeastern La Palma
- Monanthes × tilophila (Bolle) Christ (M. brachycaulos × M. laxiflora)
- Monanthes wildpretii Bañares & S.Scholz – Tenerife: near Chinamanda
- Sedum lancerottense R.P.Murray – Lanzarote

== Cucurbitaceae ==
- Bryonia verrucosa Aiton

== Cyperaceae ==
- Carex paniculata subsp. calderae (A.Hansen) Lewej. & Lobin – Tenerife
- Carex perraudieriana (Kük. ex Bornm.) Gay ex Kük. – Tenerife

== Cytinaceae ==
- Cytinus hypocistis subsp. subexsertum Finschow ex G.Kunkel
- Cytinus ruber subsp. canariensis (Webb & Berthel.) Finschow ex G.Kunkel – Parasitic on Cistus symphytiflorus

== Ericaceae ==
- Arbutus × androsterilis Salas, Acebes & del Arco (A. canariensis × A. unedo)
- Arbutus canariensis Veill. ex Duhamel – Tenerife, La Palma, La Gomera, and El Hierro
- Erica platycodon subsp. platycodon

== Euphorbiaceae ==
- Euphorbia aphylla Brouss. ex Willd. – northern Gran Canaria, northwestern Tenerife, northern La Gomera
- Euphorbia atropurpurea Brouss. ex Willd. – Tenerife
  - Euphorbia atropurpurea var. atropurpurea – western and southern Tenerife
  - Euphorbia atropurpurea f. lutea A.Santos – Tenerife
  - Euphorbia atropurpurea var. modesta Svent. – southern Tenerife
- Euphorbia berthelotii Bolle ex Boiss. – eastern La Gomera
- Euphorbia bourgaeana J.Gay ex Boiss. – Tenerife and northwestern & central Gomera
- Euphorbia bravoana Svent. – Gomera
- Euphorbia canariensis L.
- Euphorbia × fernandez-lopezii Molero & Rovira (E. berthelotii × E. bourgaeana) – La Gomera
- Euphorbia handiensis Burchard – southern Fuerteventura
- Euphorbia × jubaeaphylla Svent. (E. aphylla × E. lamarckii) – La Gomera and northwestern Tenerife
- Euphorbia lamarckii Sweet – Tenerife, northwestern La Gomera, La Palma, and El Hierro
- Euphorbia × marreroi Molero & Rovira (E. aphylla × E. regis-jubae) – Gran Canaria
- Euphorbia × navae Svent. (E. atropurpurea × E. lamarckii) – Tenerife
- Euphorbia × petterssonii Svent. (E. aphylla × E. atropurpurea f. lutea) – northwestern Tenerife
- Mercurialis canariensis Obbard & S.A.Harris

== Fabaceae ==
- Adenocarpus foliolosus (Aiton) DC.
- Adenocarpus ombriosus Ceballos & Ortuño – El Hierro: San Salvador at 900 m
- Adenocarpus viscosus (Willd.) Webb & Berthel.
- Anagyris latifolia Brouss. ex Willd. – Tenerife and Gran Canaria
- Argyrolobium armindae Marrero Rodr.
- Chamaecytisus proliferus (L.f.) Link
  - Chamaecytisus proliferus subsp. angustifolius (Kuntze) G.Kunkel – Tenerife and La Gomera
  - Chamaecytisus proliferus subsp. meridionalis Acebes – central and southern Gran Canaria
  - Chamaecytisus proliferus subsp. palmensis (Christ) G.Kunkel – La Palma
  - Chamaecytisus proliferus subsp. proliferus
- Cicer canariense A.Santos & G.P.Lewis – La Palma and Tenerife
- Cytisus filipes Webb
- Cytisus osyrioides Svent. – Tenerife
- Cytisus supranubius (L.f.) Kuntze
- Genista benehoavensis (Bolle) del Arco – La Palma
- Genista canariensis L. – Gran Canaria and Tenerife
- Genista microphylla DC. – Gran Canaria
- Genista spachiana Webb
- Genista splendens Webb & Berthel.
- Lotus arinagensis Bramwell
- Lotus berthelotii Masf. – southern Tenerife
- Lotus broussonetii Choisy ex Ser. – Tenerife and Gran Canaria
- Lotus callis-viridis Bramwell & D.H.Davis – western Gran Canaria
- Lotus campylocladus Webb & Berthel.
  - Lotus campylocladus subsp. campylocladus – Tenerife
  - Lotus campylocladus subsp. hillebrandii (Christ) Sandral & D.D.Sokoloff – El Hierro and La Palma
- Lotus dumetorum Webb ex R.P.Murray – southern Tenerife
- Lotus emeroides R.P.Murray – La Gomera
- Lotus eremiticus A.Santos – La Palma
- Lotus eriophthalmus Webb & Berthel.
- Lotus glaucus var. erythrorhizus (Bolle) Brand – Fuerteventura
- Lotus gomerythus A.Portero, J.Martín-Carbajal & R.Mesa – La Gomera
- Lotus holosericeus Webb & Berthel. – Gran Canaria
- Lotus kunkelii (Esteve) Bramwell & D.H.Davis – eastern Gran Canaria: Playa de Jinama
- Lotus maculatus Breitf. – northern Tenerife
- Lotus mascaensis Burchard – western Tenerife: Valle de Masca
- Lotus pyranthus P.Pérez – La Palma
- Lotus sessilifolius DC. – Tenerife
  - Lotus sessilifolius var. pentaphyllus (Link) D.H.Davis
  - Lotus sessilifolius subsp. sessilifolius – Tenerife
  - Lotus sessilifolius subsp. villosissimus (Pit.) Sandral & D.D.Sokoloff – El Hierro
- Lotus spartioides Webb & Berthel. – Gran Canaria
- Lotus spectabilis Choisy ex Ser.
- Lotus tenellus (Lowe) Sandral, A.Santos & D.D.Sokoloff
- Ononis angustissima subsp. angustissima
- Ononis catalinae Reyes-Bet. & S.Scholz
- Ononis christii Bolle – Fuerteventura
- Ononis hebecarpa Webb & Berthel. – Lanzarote and Fuerteventura
- Retama rhodorhizoides (Webb & Berthel.) Webb & Berthel.
- Rivasgodaya Esteve
  - Rivasgodaya nervosa Esteve – Gran Canaria
- Vicia aphylla C.Sm. ex Link
- Vicia chaetocalyx Webb & Berthel. – Gran Canaria and Tenerife
- Vicia filicaulis Webb & Berthel. – Gran Canaria
- Vicia nataliae U.Reifenb. & A.Reifenb.
- Vicia sabinarum J.Gil – El Hierro
- Vicia scandens R.P.Murray – Tenerife
- Vicia tenoi Marrero Rodr. – Tenerife
- Vicia voggenreiteriana J.Gil, R.Mesa & M.L.Gil – La Gomera
- Vicia vulcanorum J.Gil & M.L.Gil – Lanzarote

== Frankeniaceae ==
- Frankenia ericifolia C.Sm. ex DC.
  - Frankenia ericifolia subsp. ericifolia
  - Frankenia ericifolia subsp. latifolia (Webb & Berthel.) Brochmann, Lobin & Sunding – La Palma and Tenerife

== Gentianaceae ==
- Ixanthus Griseb.
  - Ixanthus viscosus (Aiton) Griseb.

== Geraniaceae ==
- Geranium reuteri Aedo & Muñoz Garm.

== Hypericaceae ==
- Hypericum coadunatum C.Sm. ex Link – Gran Canaria
- Hypericum × joerstadii Lid (H. glandulosum × H. reflexum)
- Hypericum reflexum L.f.

== Juncaceae ==
- Luzula canariensis Poir.

== Lamiaceae ==
- Bystropogon × beltraniae La Serna (B. canariensis var. smithianus × B. plumosus) – Tenerife
- Bystropogon canariensis (L.) L'Hér.
- Bystropogon odoratissimus Bolle – Tenerife
- Bystropogon origanifolius L'Hér.
  - Bystropogon origanifolius var. canariae La Serna – Gran Canaria
  - Bystropogon origanifolius var. ferrensis (Ceballos & Ortuño) La Serna – El Hierro
  - Bystropogon origanifolius var. origanifolius – Tenerife, La Gomera
  - Bystropogon origanifolius var. palmensis Bornm. – La Palma
- Bystropogon plumosus (L.f.) L'Hér. – Tenerife
- Bystropogon × serrulatus Webb & Berthel. (B. canariensis × B. origanifolium var. canariae) – Gran Canaria
- Bystropogon wildpretii La Serna – La Palma
- Lavandula bramwellii Upson & S.Andrews – western Gran Canaria
- Lavandula buchii Webb & Berthel. – Tenerife
  - Lavandula buchii var. buchii – northeastern Tenerife
  - Lavandula buchii var. gracilis M.C.León – western Tenerife
  - Lavandula buchii var. tolpidifolia (Svent.) M.C.León – western Tenerife
- Lavandula canariensis Mill.
  - Lavandula canariensis subsp. canariae Upson & S.Andrews – northern Gran Canaria
  - Lavandula canariensis subsp. canariensis – Tenerife
  - Lavandula canariensis subsp. fuerteventurae Upson & S.Andrews – Fuerteventura
  - Lavandula canariensis subsp. gomerensis Upson & S.Andrews – La Gomera
  - Lavandula canariensis subsp. hierrensis Upson & S.Andrews – El Hierro
  - Lavandula canariensis subsp. lancerottensis Upson & S.Andrews – Lanzarote
  - Lavandula canariensis subsp. palmensis Upson & S.Andrews – La Palma
- Lavandula minutolii Bolle
  - Lavandula minutolii var. minutolii – central and southern Gran Canaria
  - Lavandula minutolii var. tenuipinna Svent. – western Tenerife
- Micromeria × angosturae P.Pérez (M. tenuis subsp. linkii × M. varia subsp. canariensis) – Gran Canaria
- Micromeria × ayamosnae Puppo & P.Pérez (M. lepida subsp. bolleana × M. pedro-luisii) – La Gomera
- Micromeria benthamii Webb & Berthel. – Gran Canaria
- Micromeria × benthamineolens Svent. (M. benthamii × M. pineolens) – northwestern Gran Canaria
- Micromeria × broussonetii A.Santos, A.Acev.-Rodr. & Reyes-Bet. – (M. densiflora × M. varia)
- Micromeria canariensis (P.Pérez) Puppo – Gran Canaria
  - Micromeria canariensis subsp. canariensis – northeastern Gran Canaria
  - Micromeria canariensis subsp. meridialis (P.Pérez) Puppo – southern Gran Canaria
- Micromeria × confusa G.Kunkel & P.Pérez (M. benthamii × M. lanata) – Gran Canaria
- Micromeria densiflora Benth. – northwestern Tenerife
- Micromeria ericifolia (Roth) Bornm. – Tenerife
  - Micromeria ericifolia var. ericifolia – Tenerife
- Micromeria × garajonayii Puppo & P.Pérez – (M. lepida × M. pedro-luisii) – La Gomera
- Micromeria glomerata P.Pérez – northeastern Tenerife
- Micromeria gomerensis (P.Pérez) Puppo – La Gomera
- Micromeria helianthemifolia Webb & Berthel. – Gran Canaria
- Micromeria herpyllomorpha Webb & Berthel. – La Palma
  - Micromeria herpyllomorpha subsp. herpyllomorpha – La Palma
  - Micromeria herpyllomorpha subsp. palmensis (Bolle) Puppo – north-central La Palma
- Micromeria hierrensis (P.Pérez) Puppo – El Hierro
  - Micromeria hierrensis subsp. hierrensis – El Hierro
  - Micromeria hierrensis subsp. incana Puppo – El Hierro
- Micromeria × intermedia G.Kunkel & P.Pérez (M. benthamii × M. helianthemifolia) – Gran Canaria
- Micromeria lachnophylla Webb & Berthel. – central Tenerife
- Micromeria lanata (C.Sm. ex Link) Benth. – Gran Canaria
- Micromeria lasiophylla Webb & Berthel. – south-central Tenerife
- Micromeria lepida Webb & Berthel. – La Gomera
  - Micromeria lepida var. argagae P.Pérez – La Gomera
  - Micromeria lepida subsp. bolleana P.Pérez – southeastern La Gomera
  - Micromeria lepida var. fernandezii P.Pérez – eastern La Gomera
  - Micromeria lepida subsp. lepida – central La Gomera
- Micromeria leucantha Svent. ex P.Pérez – western Gran Canaria
- Micromeria mahanensis Puppo – Lanzarote and Fuerteventura
- Micromeria × nogalesii G.Kunkel & P.Pérez (M. lanata × M. varia subsp. canariensis) – Gran Canaria
- Micromeria pedro-luisii Puppo – La Gomera
- Micromeria × perez-pazii G.Kunkel (M. benthamii × M. tenuis) western Gran Canaria
- Micromeria pineolens Svent. – northwestern Gran Canaria
- Micromeria × preauxii Webb & Berthel. (M. benthamii × M. varia subsp. canariensis) – Gran Canaria
- Micromeria rivas-martinezii Wildpret – northeastern Tenerife
- Micromeria × tagananensis P.Pérez – (M. glomerata × M. varia) northeastern Tenerife
- Micromeria tenensis Puppo & P.Pérez – Tenerife
- Micromeria teneriffae (Poir.) Benth. ex G.Don – Tenerife
- Micromeria tenuis (Link) Benth. – Gran Canaria
  - Micromeria tenuis subsp. linkii (Webb & Berthel.) P.Pérez – northern and northwestern Gran Canaria
  - Micromeria tenuis var. soriae P.Pérez – southwestern central Gran Canaria
  - Micromeria tenuis subsp. tenuis – western Gran Canaria
- Micromeria × tolomensis Puppo & P.Pérez (M. gomerensis × M. lepida subsp. bolleana) – southeastern La Gomera
- Micromeria tragothymus Webb & Berthel. – Tenerife
- Micromeria × wildpretii P.Pérez (M. rivas-martinezii × M. varia) – northeastern Tenerife
- Nepeta teydea Webb & Berthel. – Tenerife and La Palma
- Salvia broussonetii Benth. – Tenerife, Lanzarote?
- Salvia canariensis L.
- Salvia herbanica A.Santos & M.Fernández – Fuerteventura
- Sideritis amagroi Marrero Rodr. & B.Navarro
- Sideritis × anagae (Christ) ined. (S. dendrochahorra × S. macrostachys) – northeastern Tenerife
- Sideritis barbellata Mend.-Heuer – Gran Canaria and El Hierro
- Sideritis bolleana Bornm. – La Palma
- Sideritis × bornmuelleri Negrín & P.Pérez (S. canariensis × S. oroteneriffae) – Tenerife
- Sideritis brevicaulis Mend.-Heuer – northwestern Tenerife
- Sideritis canariensis L.
- Sideritis cretica L.
  - Sideritis cretica subsp. cretica – northern Tenerife
  - Sideritis cretica subsp. spicata (Pit.) Negrín & P.Pérez – northern La Gomera
- Sideritis cystosiphon Svent. – western Tenerife
- Sideritis dasygnaphala (Webb & Berthel.) Clos – Gran Canaria
- Sideritis dendrochahorra Bolle – northeastern Tenerife
- Sideritis discolor Webb ex Bolle – northern Gran Canaria
- Sideritis eriocephala Marrero Rodr. ex Negrín & P.Pérez – central Tenerife
- Sideritis × fernandezii Negrín & P.Pérez (S. cretica subsp. spicata × S. gomerae) – La Gomera
- Sideritis ferrensis P.Pérez & Négrin – El Hierro
- Sideritis gomeraea de Noé ex Bolle – La Gomera
  - Sideritis gomeraea subsp. gomeraea – central La Gomera
  - Sideritis gomeraea subsp. perezii Négrin – south-central La Gomera
- Sideritis × guaxarae P.Pérez & Négrin (S. eriocephala × S. soluta) – central Tenerife
- Sideritis guayedrae Marrero Rodr. – Gran Canaria
- Sideritis infernalis Bolle – southwestern Tenerife
- Sideritis kuegleriana Bornm. – northern Tenerife
- Sideritis lotsyi (Pit.) Bornm. – Tenerife and La Gomera
- Sideritis macrostachyos Poir – northern and northeastern Tenerife
- Sideritis marmorea Bolle – eastern La Gomera
- Sideritis mascaensis (Svent.) Marrero Rodr. – Tenerife
- Sideritis nervosa (Christ) Linding. – northwestern Tenerife
- Sideritis nutans Svent. – western La Gomera
- Sideritis oroteneriffae Négrin & P.Pérez – Tenerife
- Sideritis pumila (Christ) Mend.-Heuer – Lanzarote and southern Fuerteventura
- Sideritis santosii Marrero Rodr. – Tenerife
- Sideritis soluta Clos – Tenerife
  - Sideritis soluta subsp. gueimaris Négrin & P.Pérez – east-central Tenerife
  - Sideritis soluta subsp. hildae Marrero Rodr. – Tenerife
  - Sideritis soluta subsp. soluta – south-central Tenerife
- Sideritis sventenii (G.Kunkel) Mend.-Heuer – south-central Gran Canaria
- Teucrium heterophyllum subsp. brevipilosum Gaisberg
- Teucrium heterophyllum subsp. hierrense Gaisberg – El Hierro
- Thymus origanoides Webb & Berthel. – Lanzarote: Famara Mts.

== Malvaceae ==
- Malva acerifolia (Cav.) Alef.
- Malva phoenicea (Vent.) Alef. – Tenerife

== Oleaceae ==
- Olea europaea subsp. guanchica P.Vargas

== Orchidaceae ==
- Habenaria tridactylites Lindl.
- Himantoglossum metlesicsianum (W.P.Teschner) P.Delforge – La Palma, southwestern and northern Tenerife
- Orchis canariensis Lindl.
- Orchis × ligustica nothosubsp. reginae (Leibbach & Ruedi Peter) J.M.H.Shaw (O. mascula × O. patens subsp. canariensis)
- Orchis mascula subsp. lapalmensis Leibbach & Ruedi Peter – La Palma

== Orobanchaceae ==
- Orobanche gratiosa (Webb & Berthel.) Linding.

== Papaveraceae ==
- Fumaria coccinea Lowe ex Pugsley

== Pinaceae ==
- Pinus canariensis C.Sm. ex DC.

== Plantaginaceae ==
- Campylanthus salsoloides (L.f.) Roth
- Digitalis canariensis L. – La Palma, Tenerife, and La Gomera
- Digitalis chalcantha (Svent. & O'Shan.) Albach, Bräuchler & Heubl – Gran Canaria
- Digitalis isabelliana (Webb) Linding. – Tenerife and Gran Canaria
- Globularia ascanii Bramwell & Kunkel – Gran Canaria
- Globularia × indubia (Svent.) G.Kunkel (G. salicina × G. sarcophylla) – Gran Canaria
- Globularia sarcophylla Svent. – Gran Canaria
- Kickxia pendula (G.Kunkel) G.Kunkel – Gran Canaria
- Nanorrhinum scoparium (Brouss. ex Spreng.) Yousefi & Zarre
- Nanorrhinum urbanii (Pit.) Yousefi & Zarre – Gran Canaria and Tenerife
- Plantago arborescens subsp. arborescens
- Plantago asphodeloides Svent. – Tenerife and Gran Canaria
- Plantago famarae Svent. – Lanzarote
- Plantago webbii Barnéoud

== Plumbaginaceae ==
- Limonium arboreum (Willd.) H.Arnaud – northern Tenerife
- Limonium benmageci Marrero Rodr.
- Limonium bollei (Webb ex Wangerin) Erben – I. de Lobos
- Limonium bourgaei (Webb ex Boiss.) Kuntze – Lanzarote and Fuerteventura
- Limonium brassicifolium (Webb & Berthel.) Kuntze – El Hierro and La Gomera
  - Limonium brassicifolium subsp. brassicifolium – El Hierro and La Gomera
  - Limonium brassicifolium subsp. macropterum (Webb & Berthel.) G.Kunkel
- Limonium dendroides Svent. – La Gomera
- Limonium frutescens (Lem.) Erben, A.Santos & Reyes-Bet. – Tenerife
- Limonium imbricatum (Webb ex Girard) H.Arnaud – La Palma and Tenerife
- Limonium macrophyllum (Willd. ex Spreng.) H.Arnaud northeastern Tenerife
- Limonium papillatum var. papillatum
- Limonium perezii (Stapf) F.T.Hubb. – Tenerife
- Limonium preauxii (Webb & Berthel.) Kuntze - western Gran Canaria
- Limonium puberulum (Webb ex Lindl.) H.Arnaud – northern Lanzarote
- Limonium redivivum (Svent.) G.Kunkel & Sunding eastern La Gomera
- Limonium relicticum R.Mesa & A.Santos
- Limonium rumicifolium (Svent.) G.Kunkel & Sunding – southern Gran Canaria
- Limonium spectabile (Svent.) G.Kunkel & Sunding – Tenerife: Barranco de Masca
- Limonium sventenii A.Santos & M.Fernández
- Limonium vigaroense Marrero Rodr. & R.S.Almeida – Gran Canaria

== Poaceae ==
- Arrhenatherum calderae A.Hansen – Tenerife
- Avena canariensis B.R.Baum, Rajhathy & D.R.Sampson – Lanzarote and Fuerteventura
- Brachypodium arbuscula Gay ex Knoche
- Festuca agustini Linding.
- Festuca teneriffae Roth
- Holcus hierrensis (Stierst.) Stierst. & M.Seq. – El Hierro
- Lolium saxatile H.Scholz & S.Scholz – eastern Canary Is
- Melica teneriffae Hack. ex Christ
- Poa pitardiana H.Scholz
- Sporobolus copei Verloove – northeastern Tenerife
- Trisetum tamonanteae Marrero Rodr. & S.Scholz – Fuerteventura

== Polygonaceae ==
- Rumex lunaria L.

== Polypodiaceae ==
- Dryopteris × cedroensis Gibby & Widén – (D. guanchica × D. oligodonta) – La Gomera
- † Grammitis quaerenda Bolle – northeastern Tenerife. Last recorded in the 1850s.

== Portulacaceae ==
- Portulaca canariensis Danin & Reyes-Bet.

== Primulaceae ==
- Pleiomeris A.DC.
  - Pleiomeris canariensis (Willd.) A.DC.

== Resedaceae ==
- Reseda lancerotae Webb ex Delile
- Reseda scoparia Brouss. ex Willd.

== Rhamnaceae ==
- Rhamnus crenulata Aiton
- Rhamnus integrifolia DC. – Tenerife

== Rosaceae ==
- Bencomia Webb & Berthel.
  - Bencomia brachystachya Svent. – Gran Canaria
  - Bencomia caudata (Aiton) Webb & Berthel.
  - Bencomia sphaerocarpa Svent. – La Palma and El Hierro
- Marcetella moquiniana (Webb & Berthel.) Svent.
- Rubus bollei Focke
- Rubus palmensis A.Hansen – La Palma
- Sanguisorba menendezii (Svent.) Nordborg – Gran Canaria

== Rubiaceae ==
- Phyllis viscosa Christ
- Plocama pendula Aiton

== Rutaceae ==
- Cneorum pulverulentum Vent.
- Ruta microcarpa Svent. – La Gomera
- Ruta museocanariensis Marrero Rodr., Vidal-Matutano, Delg.-Darias & Jaén-Molina – Gran Canaria
- Ruta oreojasme Webb – southeastern Gran Canaria
- Ruta pinnata L.f. – La Palma and Tenerife

== Santalaceae ==
- Thesium canariense (Stearn) J.C.Manning & F.Forest – Gran Canaria
- Thesium palmense P.Pérez & P.Sosa – La Palma
- Thesium psilotocladum Svent. – Tenerife: ravine of Masca
- Thesium retamoides (A.Santos) J.C.Manning & F.Forest
- Thesium subsucculentum (Kämmer) J.C.Manning & F.Forest

== Sapotaceae ==
- Sideroxylon canariense Leyens, Lobin & A.Santos

== Scrophulariaceae ==
- Camptoloma canariense (Webb & Berthel.) Hilliard – Gran Canaria
- Scrophularia calliantha Webb & Berthel. – Gran Canaria
- Scrophularia glabrata Aiton – La Palma and Tenerife
- Scrophularia smithii Hornem. – Tenerife
  - Scrophularia smithii subsp. hierrensis Dalgaard
  - Scrophularia smithii subsp. langeana (Bolle) Dalgaard
  - Scrophularia smithii subsp. smithii – northern Tenerife

== Solanaceae ==
- Solanum lidii Sunding – Gran Canaria
- Solanum nava Webb & Berthel. – Gran Canaria and Tenerife
- Solanum vespertilio Aiton
  - Solanum vespertilio subsp. doramae Marrero Rodr. & Gonz.-Mart. – Gran Canaria
  - Solanum vespertilio subsp. vespertilio – Tenerife
- Withania aristata (Aiton) Pauquy

== Urticaceae ==
- Forsskaolea angustifolia Retz.
- Gesnouinia Gaudich.
  - Gesnouinia arborea (L.f.) Gaudich.
- Parietaria filamentosa Webb & Berthel. – Tenerife, La Palma
- Urtica stachyoides Webb & Berthel.

== Viburnaceae ==
- Sambucus palmensis Link in C.L.von Buch – La Palma and Tenerife
- Viburnum rugosum Pers.

== Violaceae ==
- Viola anagae Gilli
- Viola cheiranthifolia Bonpl. – Tenerife
- Viola guaxarensis M.Marrero, Docoito Díaz & Martín Esquivel – Tenerife
- Viola palmensis (Webb & Berthel.) Sauer – La Palma
