= Johann Friedrich Ruthe =

German teacher (Oberlehrer), botanist and entomologist

Johann Friedrich Ruthe Ruthé or von Ruthe (16 April 1788 in Eggenstädt, near Hildesheim – 24 August 1859 in Berlin) was a German teacher (Oberlehrer), botanist and entomologist. In the field of entomology he specialised in Hymenoptera and Diptera.

With assistance from Heinrich Friedrich Link (1767–1851) he began his studies at the University of Berlin in 1811. Here he had as instructors Karl Rudolphi (1771–1832) and Martin Lichtenstein (1780–1857). After concluding his university studies, he taught classes at several schools in Berlin and Frankfurt an der Oder. Due to poor health he retired from teaching in 1842. Ruthe issued the exsiccata work Flora der Mittelmark in getrockneten Exemplaren (1820–1822).

The fungi genus Ruthea is named after him, now a synonym of Paxillus. Also in 1976, botanists A.Hansen & G.Kunkel published Rutheopsis, a genus of flowering plants from the Canary Islands belonging to the family Apiaceae, also named in his honour.

== Written works ==
Among his written works was a textbook on zoology, "Handbuch der Zoologie", that was co-authored with Arend Friedrich August Wiegmann (1802–1841). Other noted publications by Ruthe are the following:

- Einige Bemerkungen und Nachträge zu Meigen's "Systematischer Beschreibung der europäischen zweiflügeligen Insecten". Isis (Oken's) 1831: 1203-22 (1831).
- Flora der Mark Brandenburg und der Niederlausitz (1827, 2nd ed. 1834) - Flora of Mark Brandenburg and Lower Lusatia.
- Leben eines Niedersachsen, von ihm selbst beschrieben (1841) - The life of a Low Saxon, as described by himself.
- Die Spheciden und Chrysiden der Umgegend Berlins (1857) - Sphecidae and Chrysididae found in the vicinity of Berlin.

== Other sources ==
- ADB:Ruthe, Johann Friedrich – Wikisource biography
- Martin Lowsky: Johann Friedrich Ruthe. Deserteur und Vagabund im Königreich Westphalen, Gelehrter in Berlin. In: H. Joachim Kusserow/Guide Erol Öztanil (ed.): "Mit stahlscharfer Klinge". Beiträge zu Johann Heinrich Oppermann. Hannover: Wehrhahn Verlag 2012, p. 121-140.
