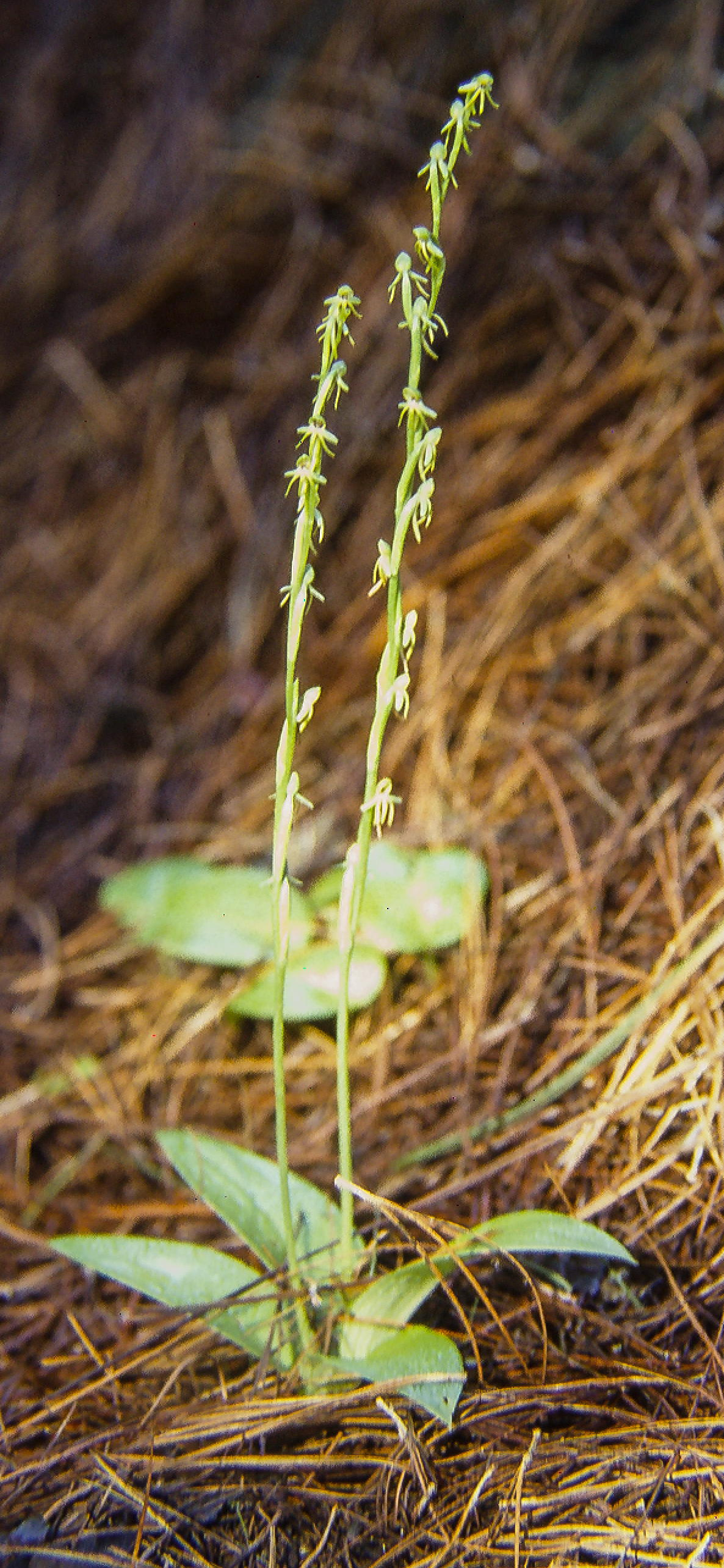

Conservation status
- Least Concern (IUCN 3.1)
- CITES Appendix II

Scientific classification
- Kingdom: Plantae
- Clade: Tracheophytes
- Clade: Angiosperms
- Clade: Monocots
- Order: Asparagales
- Family: Orchidaceae
- Subfamily: Orchidoideae
- Genus: Habenaria
- Species: H. tridactylites

Binomial name
- Habenaria tridactylites Lindl.

Synonyms
- Orchis tridactylites (Lindl.) Webb & Berthel.

= Habenaria tridactylites =

Species of flowering plant

Habenaria tridactylites, the Canary three-finger orchid, is a species of flowering plant in the family Orchidaceae, native to the Canary Islands. It was first described by John Lindley in 1835.

== Description ==
Habenaria tridactylites is a terrestrial orchid. The upper perianth segments form a "helmet". The lowest petal forms the lip, which is deeply divided into three very long lobes. The flower also has a long spur.

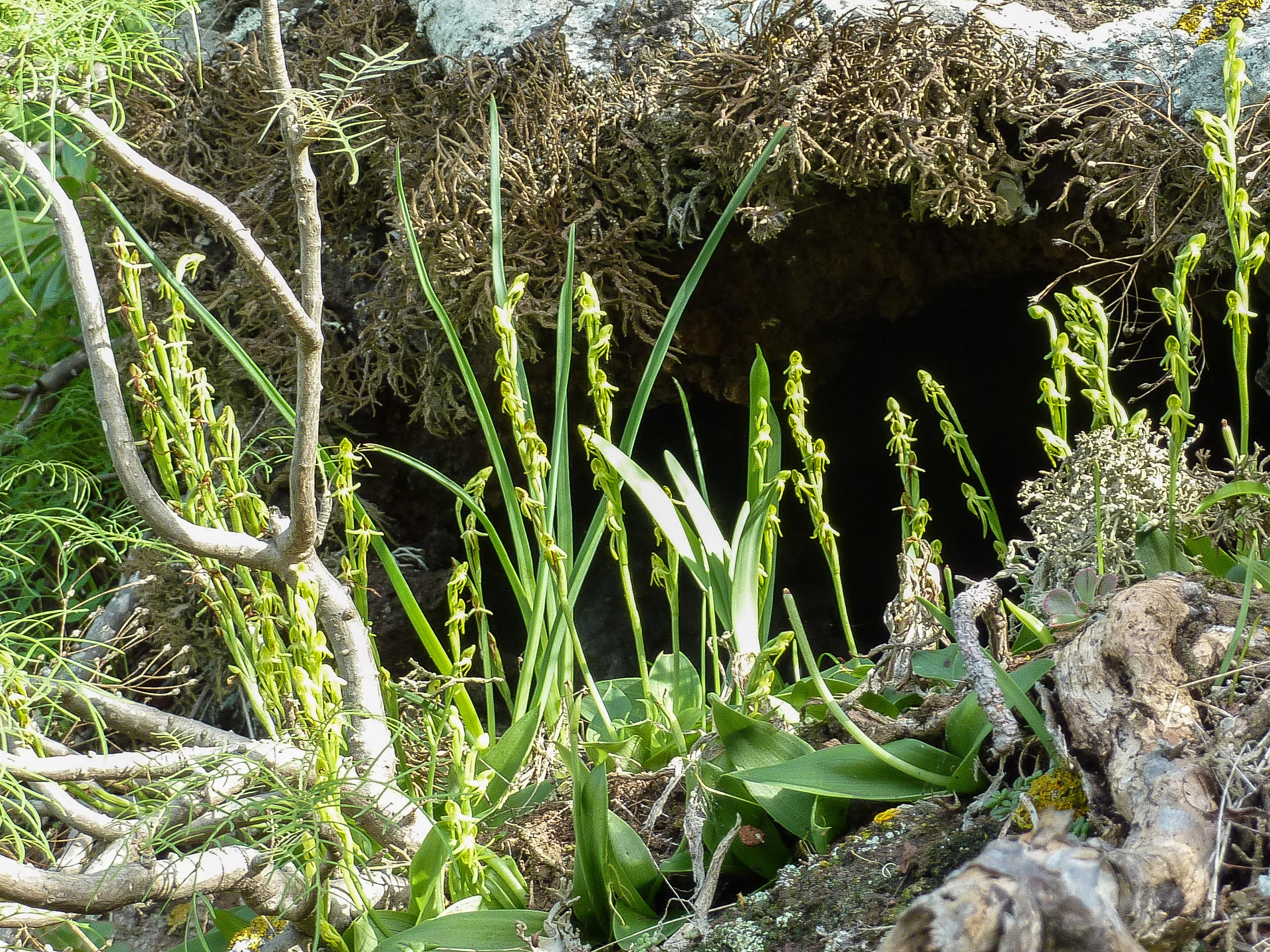
In habitat

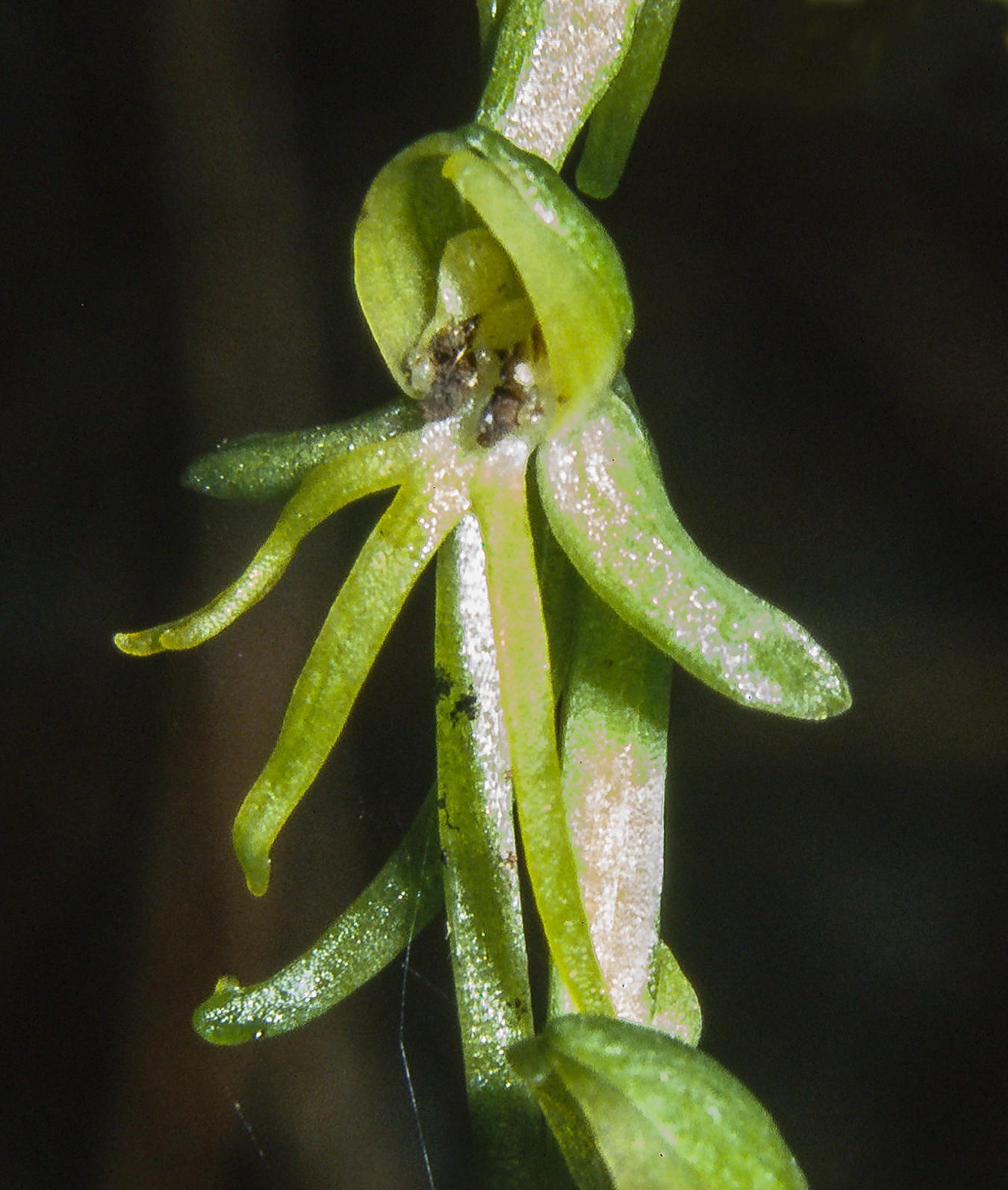
Flower

== Distribution and habitat ==
Habenaria tridactylites is endemic to the Canary Islands. In Tenerife, it is found on forested hillsides in the lower zone; in Gran Canaria, it occurs at elevations of 200–800 m; it also occurs in the other islands – La Gomera, La Palma, El Hierro, Lanzarote and Fuerteventura.
