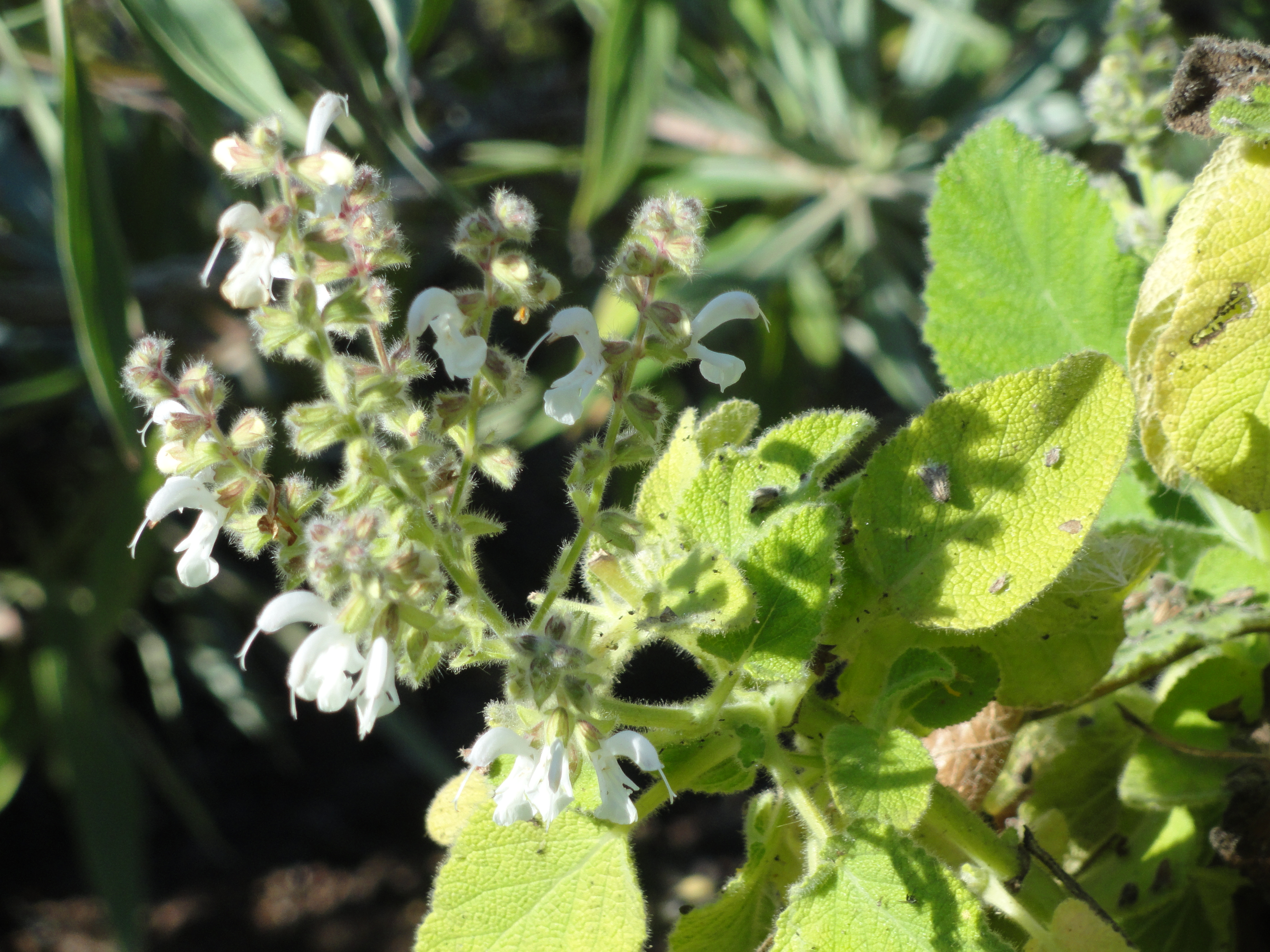

Scientific classification
- Kingdom: Plantae
- Clade: Tracheophytes
- Clade: Angiosperms
- Clade: Eudicots
- Clade: Asterids
- Order: Lamiales
- Family: Lamiaceae
- Genus: Salvia
- Species: S. broussonetii

Binomial name
- Salvia broussonetii Benth.

= Salvia broussonetii =

Species of shrub

Salvia broussonetii is a shrubby perennial native to ocean cliffs of the Canary Islands, and is found on Tenerife and Lanzarote growing in basalt rock. The plant was named after Pierre Marie Auguste Broussonet. It grows about 2 ft tall and wide, with a woody rootstock and sturdy appearance, with large (4 inches long) yellow-green elliptical shaped sticky leaves. It has small white flowers on short inflorescences (8–10 in).
