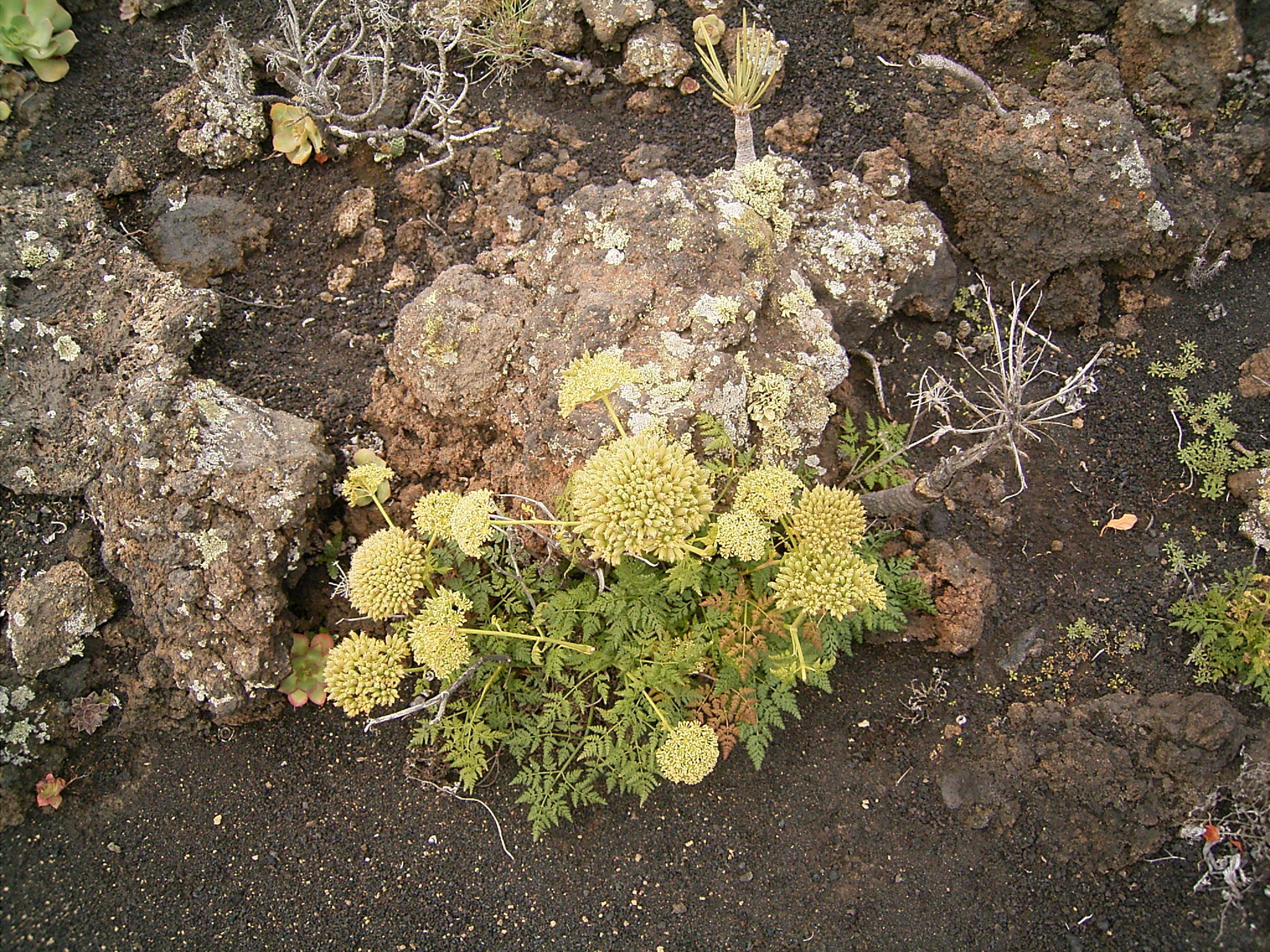
- Todaroa aurea

Scientific classification
- Kingdom: Plantae
- Clade: Tracheophytes
- Clade: Angiosperms
- Clade: Eudicots
- Clade: Asterids
- Order: Apiales
- Family: Apiaceae
- Subfamily: Apioideae
- Tribe: Scandiceae
- Subtribe: Scandicinae
- Genus: Todaroa; Parl.
- Species: T. aurea

Binomial name
- Todaroa aurea (Aiton) Parl.

Synonyms
- Ferula aurea (Aiton) Link; Peucedanum aureum Aiton

= Todaroa =

Genus of plants

Todaroa is a monotypic genus of flowering plants belonging to the family Apiaceae. It just contains one known species, Todaroa aurea.

It is also in the subfamily Apioideae and it is part of tribe Scandiceae and subtribe Scandicinae.

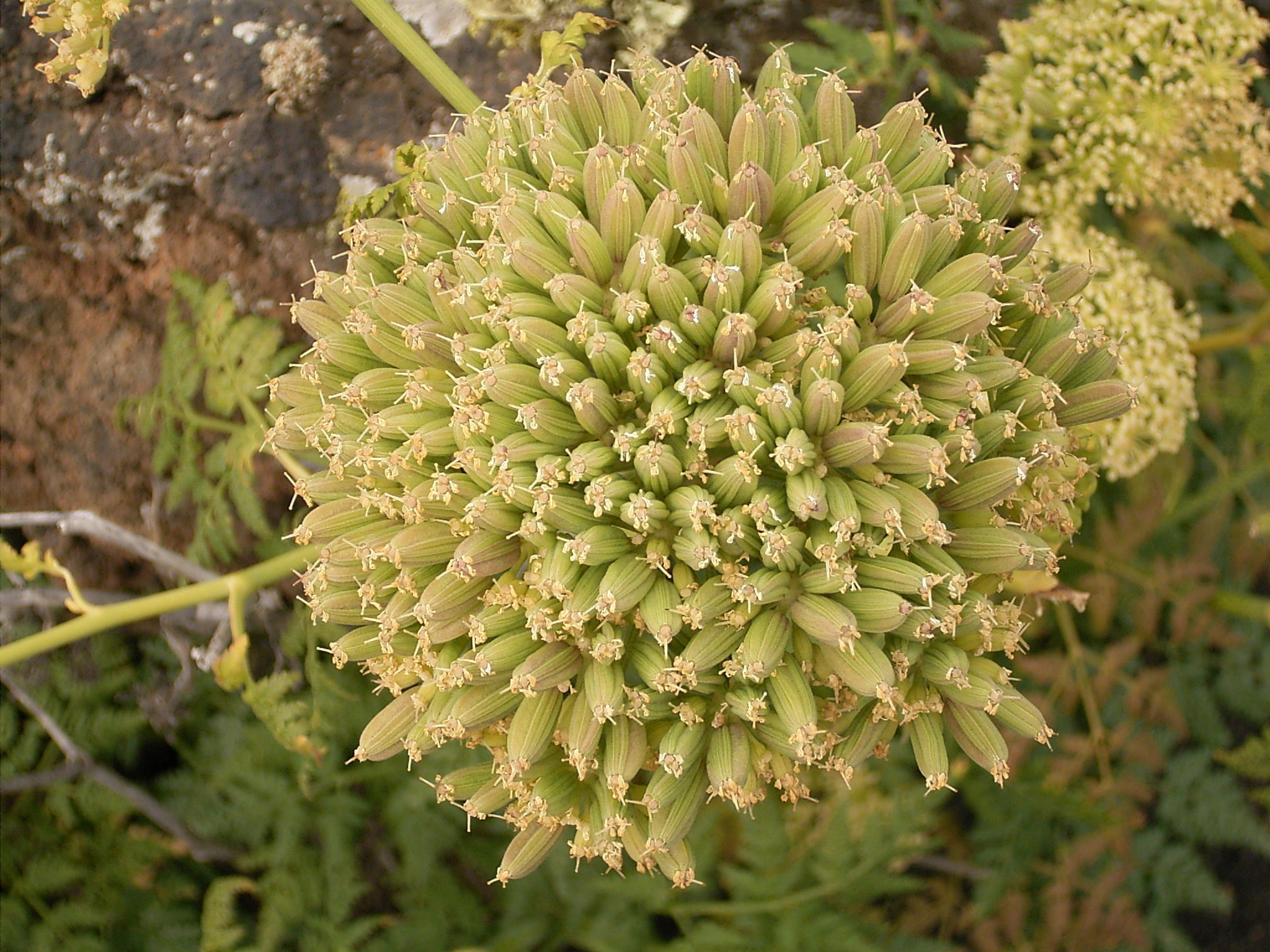

It is native to the Canary Islands.

The genus name of Todaroa is in honour of Agostino Todaro (1818–1892), an Italian botanist. The Latin specific epithet of aurea means golden. Both the genus and the species were first described and published in P.B.Webb & S.Berthelot, Hist. Nat. Iles Canaries Series 3 (Vol.2; Issue 2) on page 155 in 1843.

There are 2 accepted subspecies:

- Todaroa aurea subsp. aurea
- Todaroa aurea subsp. suaveolens P.Pérez
