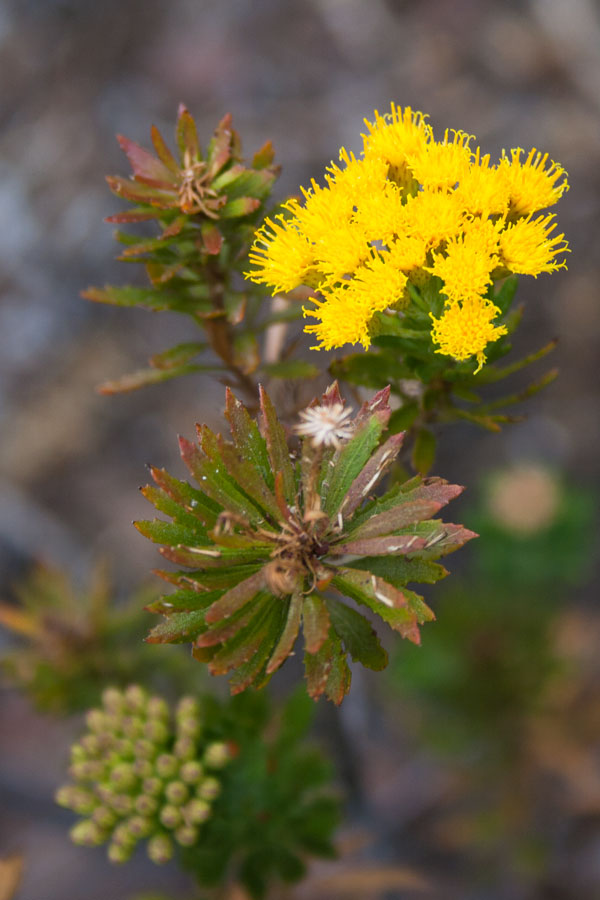
- Allagopappus canariensis

Scientific classification
- Kingdom: Plantae
- Clade: Tracheophytes
- Clade: Angiosperms
- Clade: Eudicots
- Clade: Asterids
- Order: Asterales
- Family: Asteraceae
- Subfamily: Asteroideae
- Tribe: Inuleae
- Genus: Allagopappus; Cass.

Type species
- Allagopappus dichotomus (syn of A. canariensis) Cass.

= Allagopappus =

Genus of flowering plants

Allagopappus is a genus of flowering plants in the daisy family described as a genus in 1828.

Allagopappus is endemic to the Canary Islands.

Species

- Allagopappus canariensis (Willd.) Greuter - Canary Islands
- Allagopappus viscosissimus Bolle - Gran Canaria
