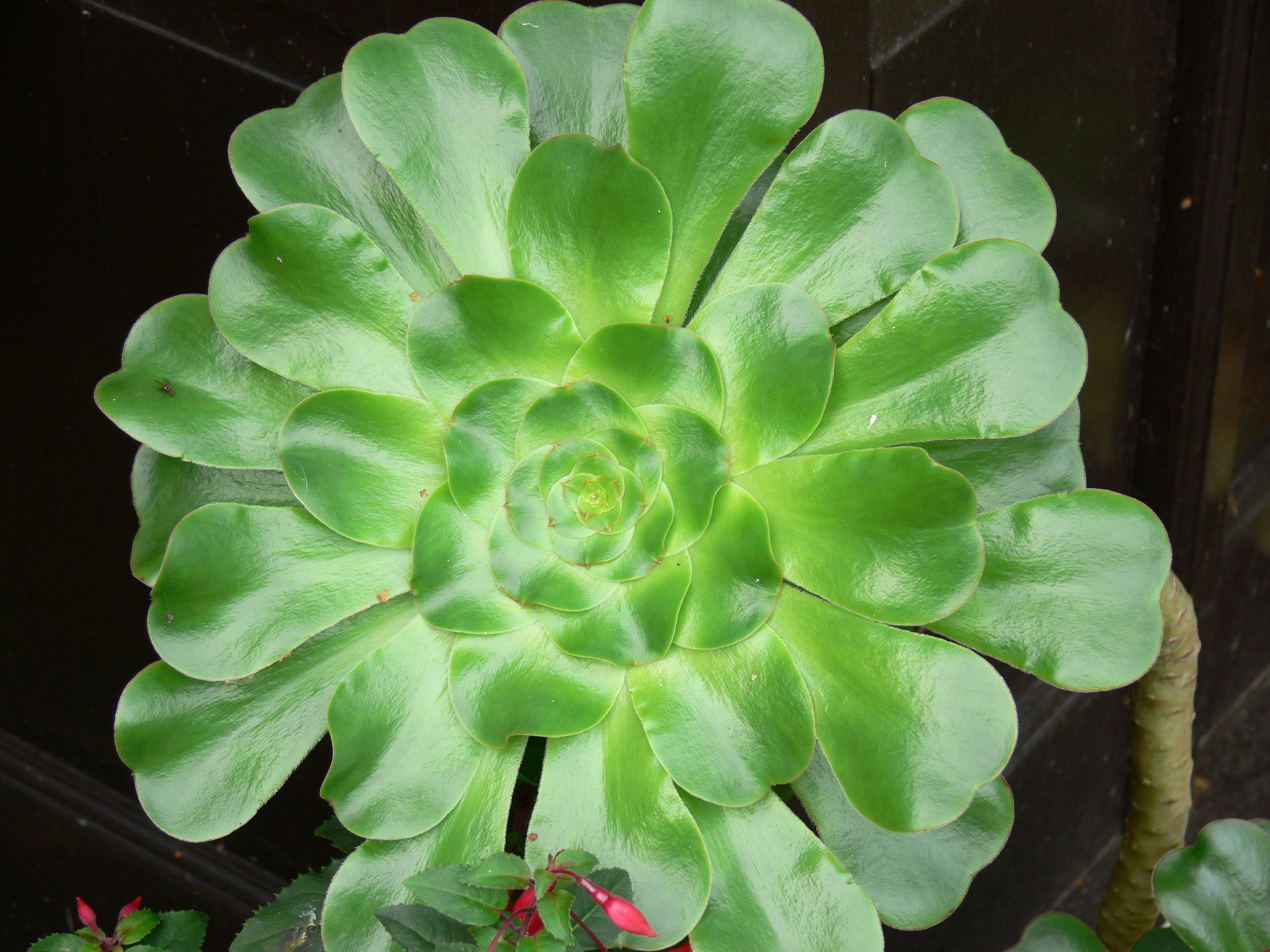
- Foliage

Scientific classification
- Kingdom: Plantae
- Clade: Tracheophytes
- Clade: Angiosperms
- Clade: Eudicots
- Order: Saxifragales
- Family: Crassulaceae
- Genus: Aeonium
- Species: A. undulatum

Binomial name
- Aeonium undulatum Webb & Berthel.

Synonyms
- Aeonium youngianum Webb & Berthel; Sempervivum youngianum (Web & Berthel) Christ.

= Aeonium undulatum =

Species of succulent

Aeonium undulatum is a succulent, evergreen flowering plant in the family Crassulaceae. It is a subshrub, one of the larger species of Aeonium with an 8–12 inches (200–300 mm) rosette of bright, glossy green leaves often over a metre from the ground on a single, unbranched stem. Other rosettes do not branch off this stem (normally) but grow from the bottom, unlike most aeoniums. The plant is monocarpic so the flowering stem will die after producing its yellow inflorescence, which is normally after about 5 years.

Aeonium undulatum is native and endemic to Gran Canaria in the Canary islands.

The Latin specific epithet undulatum means "wavy", and refers to the leaf shape. The common name "saucer plant" is applied to this and other plants of a similar habit.

In temperate regions this plant may be grown under glass, in a suitable cactus compost. It prefers full sun to part shade and requires excellent drainage. In the US, it may be grown outside in zones 10 and 11.

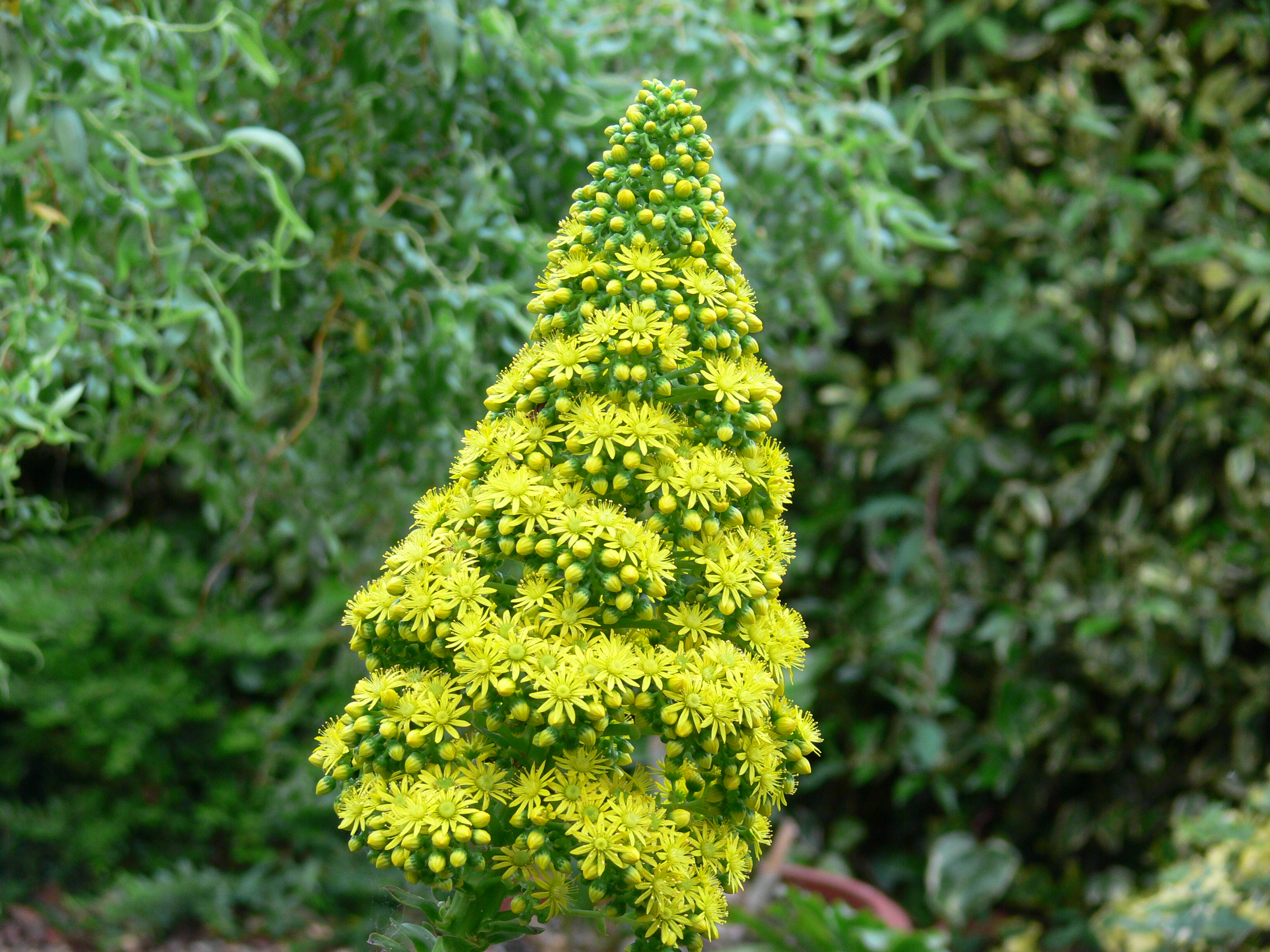
Inflorescence
