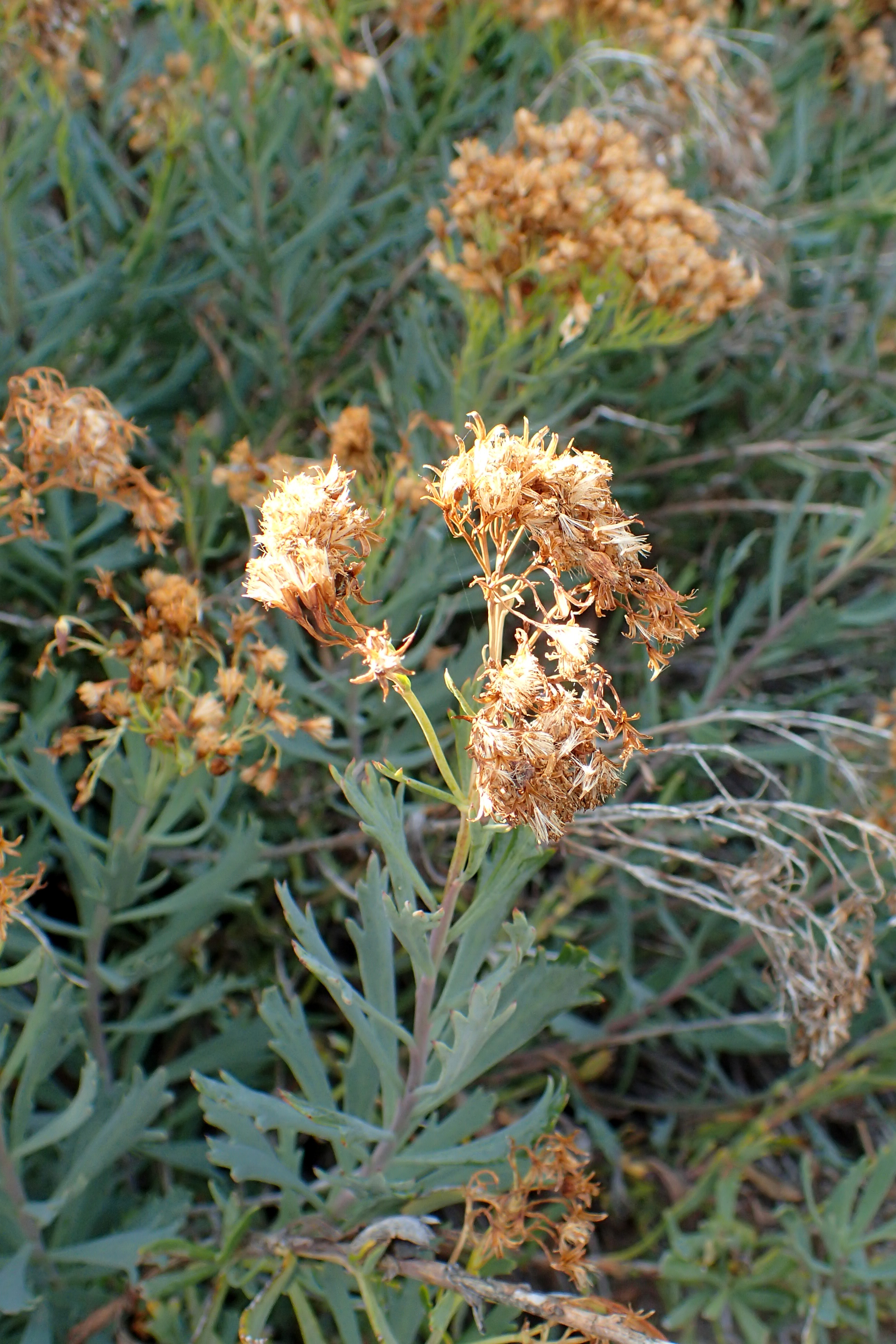
- Bethencourtia palmensis

Scientific classification
- Kingdom: Plantae
- Clade: Embryophytes
- Clade: Tracheophytes
- Clade: Angiosperms
- Clade: Eudicots
- Clade: Asterids
- Order: Asterales
- Family: Asteraceae
- Subfamily: Asteroideae
- Tribe: Senecioneae
- Genus: Bethencourtia; Choisy ex Link

Synonyms
- Canariothamnus B.Nord.; Senecio sect. Bethencourtii DC.

= Bethencourtia =

Genus of flowering plants

Bethencourtia is a genus of flowering plants in the daisy family, Asteraceae. It contains three species of plants endemic to the Canary Islands.

Species:

- Bethencourtia hermosae
- Bethencourtia palmensis
- Bethencourtia rupicola
