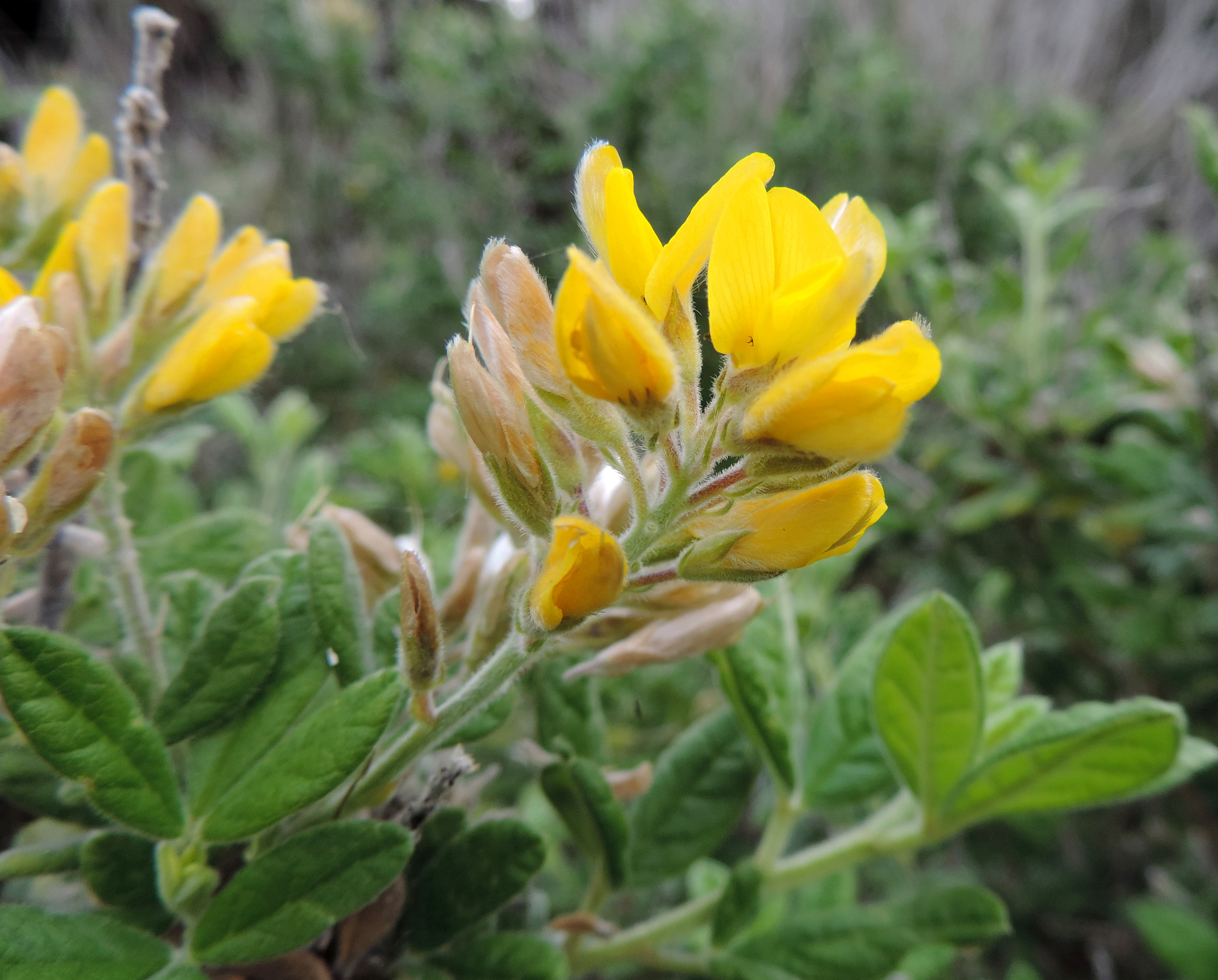

Scientific classification
- Kingdom: Plantae
- Clade: Tracheophytes
- Clade: Angiosperms
- Clade: Eudicots
- Clade: Rosids
- Order: Fabales
- Family: Fabaceae
- Genus: Rivasgodaya; Esteve (1973)
- Species: R. nervosa

Binomial name
- Rivasgodaya nervosa Esteve (1973)

Synonyms
- Teline nervosa (Esteve) A.Hansen & Sunding (1979)

= Rivasgodaya =

Genus of legumes

Rivasgodaya is a monotypic genus of flowering plants belonging to the legume family, Fabaceae. It just contains one species, Rivasgodaya nervosa.

It is native to the Canary Islands.

The genus name of Rivasgodaya is in honour of Salvador Rivas Goday (1905–1981), a Spanish botanist and plant geographer, professor of pharmacy in Madrid. The Latin specific epithet of nervosa means veined, originally from nervus. Both the genus and the species were first described and published in Trab. Dept. Bot. Univ. Granada Vol.2 on pages 81-82 in 1973.

It is also thought to be a synonym for Teline nervosa.
