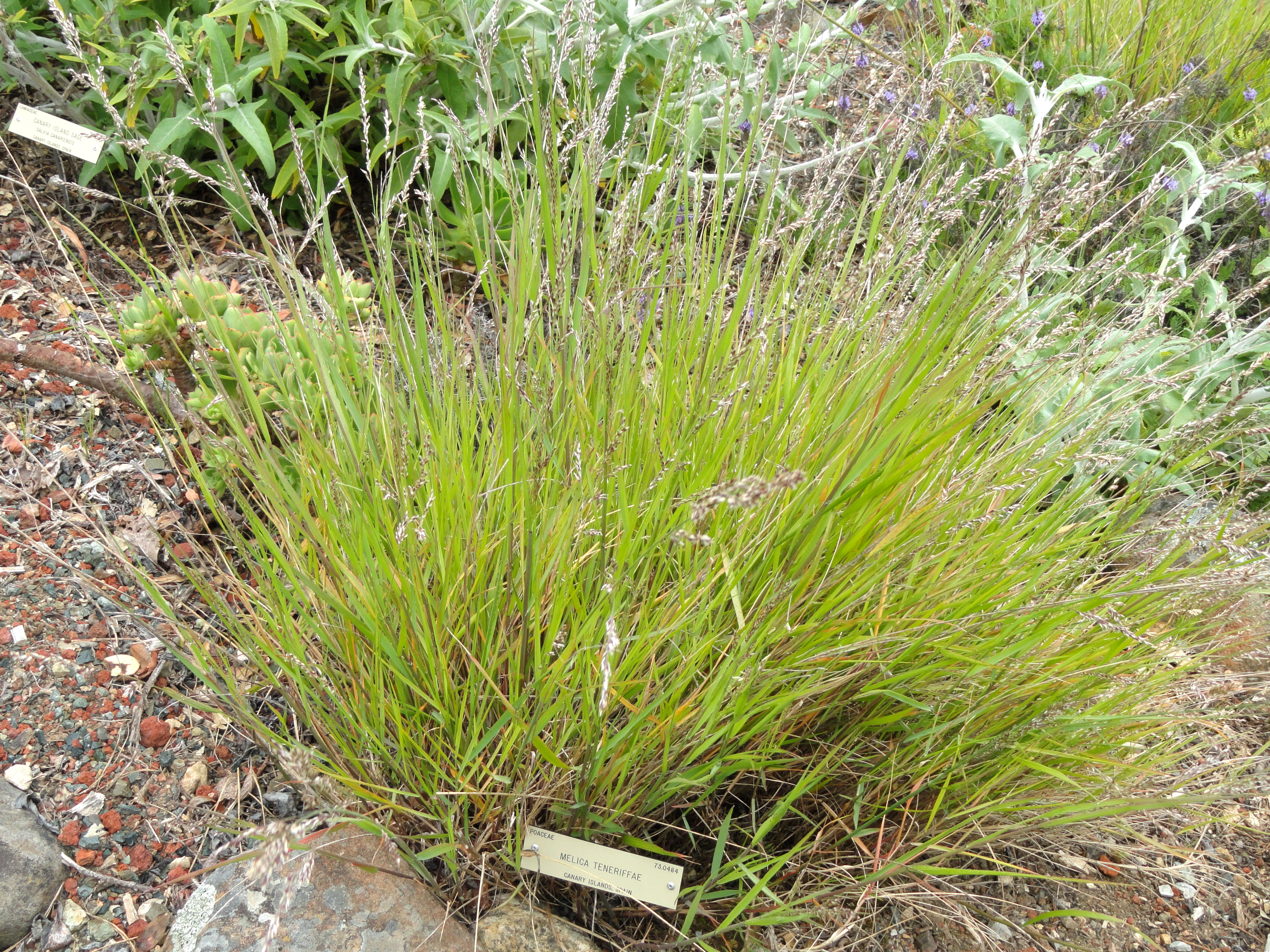
- Melica teneriffae at University of California Botanical Garden

Scientific classification
- Kingdom: Plantae
- Clade: Tracheophytes
- Clade: Angiosperms
- Clade: Monocots
- Clade: Commelinids
- Order: Poales
- Family: Poaceae
- Subfamily: Pooideae
- Genus: Melica
- Species: M. teneriffae

Binomial name
- Melica teneriffae Hack. ex Christ

= Melica teneriffae =

Species of grass

Melica teneriffae, is a grass species in the family Poaceae that is endemic to the Canary Islands.

== Description ==
The species is perennial and caespitose with culms being 80–100 centimetres (31–39 in) long. The leaf-sheaths are tubular. Leaf-blades are stiff and are 10–20 centimetres (3.9–7.9 in) long and 2–4 millimetres (0.079–0.157 in) wide. They also have scabrous surface.

The panicle itself is open and pyramidal, and is 15–20 centimetres (5.9–7.9 in) long. The nodes are whorled and are 3–8 centimetres (1.2–3.1 in) long. Inflorence is comprised out of 60–120 fertile spikelets with 5–10 centimetres (2.0–3.9 in) long peduncle, which is also glabrous. The spikelets themselves are made out of 1–2 fertile florets and are diminished at the apex. Fertile spikelets are pediceled, the pedicels of which are filiform, oblong and are 7–10 millimetres (0.28–0.39 in) long.

Fertile lemma is chartaceous, keelless, ovate, pallid, is 6 millimetres (0.24 in) long and 7-veined. It surface is asperulous, while it margins are ciliated and hairy on the bottom. The apex of the lemma is obtuse. Sterile florets are barren, clumped, oblong, and 2 millimetres (0.079 in) long. Both the lower and upper glumes are ovate, keelless, membranous, and have acute apexes. Their size is different; Lower glume is 4–5 millimetres (0.16–0.20 in) long, is pallid and purple coloured, while the upper one is 5–6 millimetres (0.20–0.24 in) long. Palea have ciliolated keels and is 2-veined. Flowers are fleshy, oblong, truncate, have 2 lodicules, 3 stamens and grow together. The fruits are caryopses and have an adherent pericarp with linear hilum.
