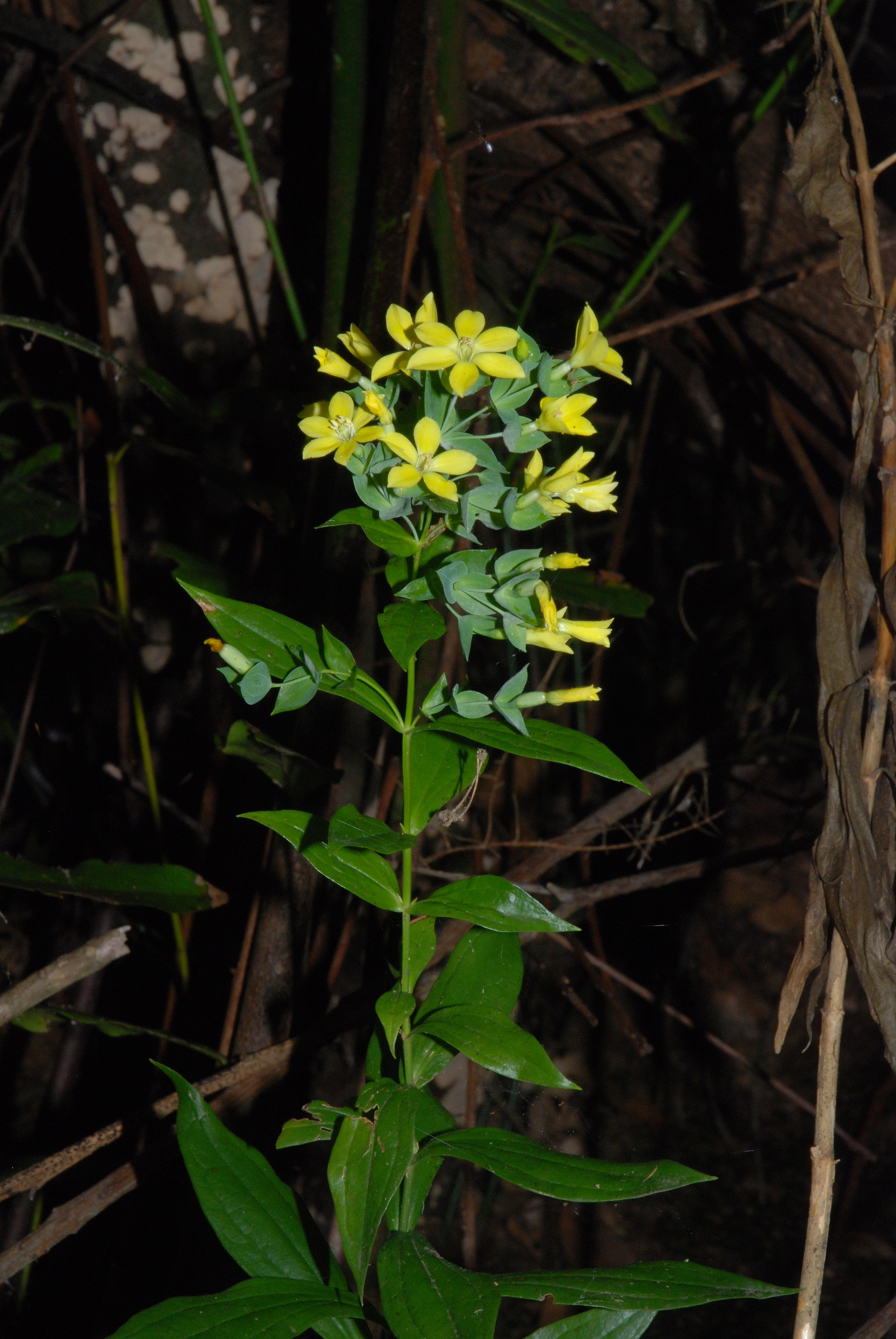

Scientific classification
- Kingdom: Plantae
- Clade: Tracheophytes
- Clade: Angiosperms
- Clade: Eudicots
- Clade: Asterids
- Order: Gentianales
- Family: Gentianaceae
- Tribe: Chironieae
- Subtribe: Chironiinae
- Genus: Ixanthus; Griseb.
- Species: I. viscosus

Binomial name
- Ixanthus viscosus (Aiton) Griseb.

Synonyms
- Wildpretina Kuntze

= Ixanthus =

Genus of flowering plants

Ixanthus is a monotypic plant genus in the family Gentianaceae. The sole species, Ixanthus viscosus, is endemic to Canary Islands laurel fields and displays small yellow flowers when in bloom.
