= Dicheranthus =

Scientific classification
- Kingdom: Plantae
- Clade: Tracheophytes
- Clade: Angiosperms
- Clade: Eudicots
- Order: Caryophyllales
- Family: Caryophyllaceae
- Genus: Dicheranthus; Webb
- Species: D. plocamoides

Binomial name
- Dicheranthus plocamoides Webb

Genus of plants

Dicheranthus is a monotypic genus of flowering plants belonging to the family Caryophyllaceae. The only species is Dicheranthus plocamoides.

Its native range is Canary Islands.
