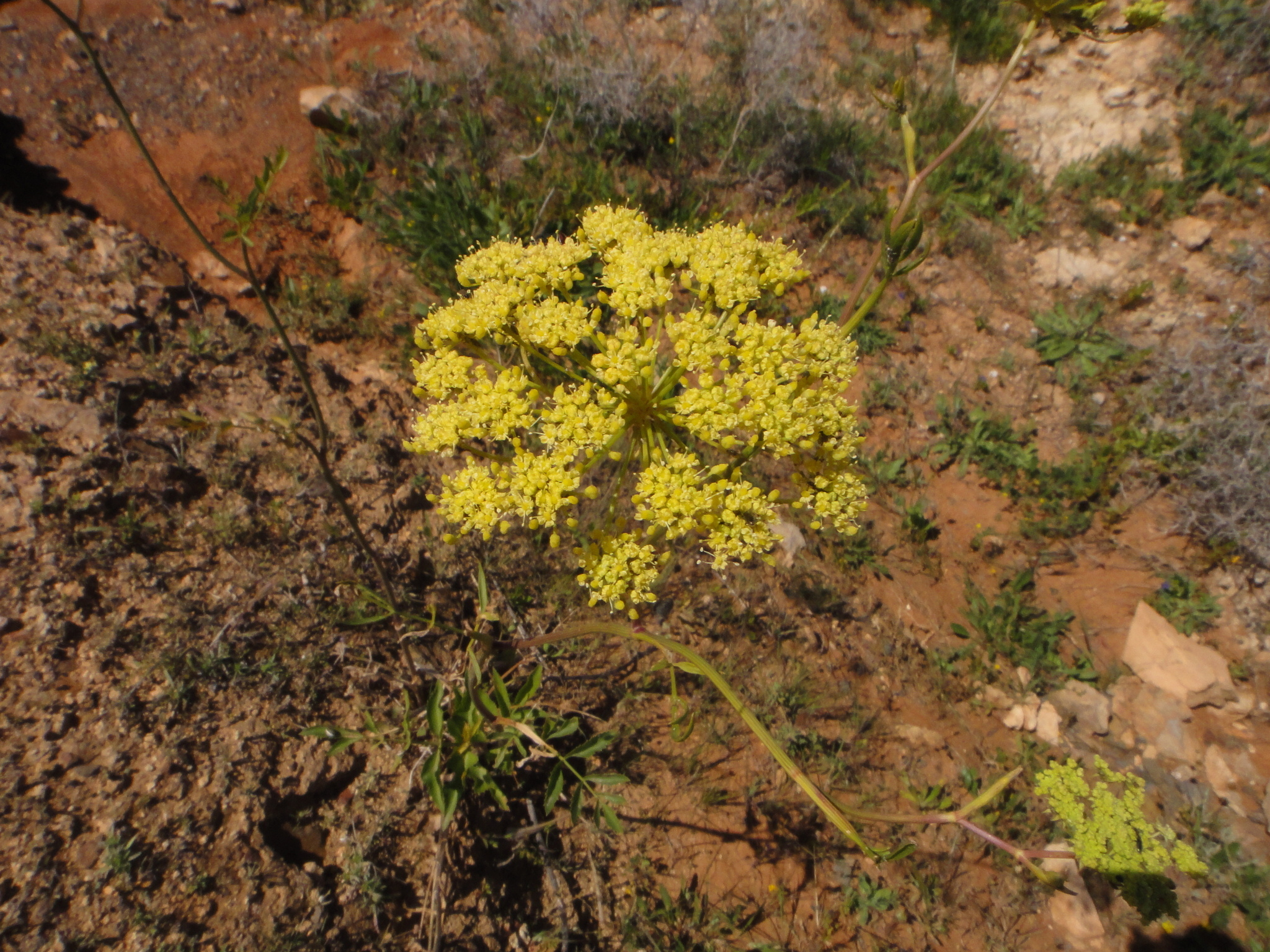

Scientific classification
- Kingdom: Plantae
- Clade: Tracheophytes
- Clade: Angiosperms
- Clade: Eudicots
- Clade: Asterids
- Order: Apiales
- Family: Apiaceae
- Genus: Rutheopsis; A.Hansen & G.Kunkel

Species
- Rutheopsis herbanica (Bolle) A.Hansen & G.Kunkel; Rutheopsis tortuosa (Webb & Berthel.) Frank., Reyes-Bet., Reduron & Spalik

Synonyms
- Canaria Jim.Mejías & P.Vargas; Gliopsis Rauschert, nom. superfl.; Ruthea Bolle, nom. illeg.

= Rutheopsis =

Rutheopsis herbanica

Genus of flowering plants

Rutheopsis is a genus of flowering plants belonging to the family Apiaceae. It contains two species, Rutheopsis herbanica and Rutheopsis tortuosa, which are endemic to the Canary Islands.

The genus name of Rutheopsis is in honour of Johann Friedrich Ruthe (1788–1859), a German teacher (Oberlehrer), botanist and entomologist. The genus has 3 known synonyms; Canaria Jim.Mejías & P.Vargas, Gliopsis Rauschert and Ruthea Bolle. The Latin specific epithet of herbanica refers to being herbaceous. It was first described and published in Cuad. Bot. Canaria Vol.26-27 on page 61 in 1976.

Both species in the genus are descended from a common ancestor that dispersed from north-western Africa to the Canary Islands. Both plants species are endemic to the Canary Islands and are glabrous perennials with yellow flowers and glabrous, ovoid to oblong fruits with thickened ribs. Rutheopsis herbanica is only found in Lanzarote and Fuerteventura. Whereas Rutheopsis tortuosa inhabits El Hierro, La Palma, La Gomera, Tenerife and Gran Canaria. They do differ somewhat in leaf division and the shape of the leaf lobes but generally they are morphologically similar. Rutheopsis tortuosa was previously placed in the monotypic genus Canaria as Canaria tortuosa. It was renamed Rutheopsis tortuosa in 2021 when Canaria was synonymized with Rutheopsis.
