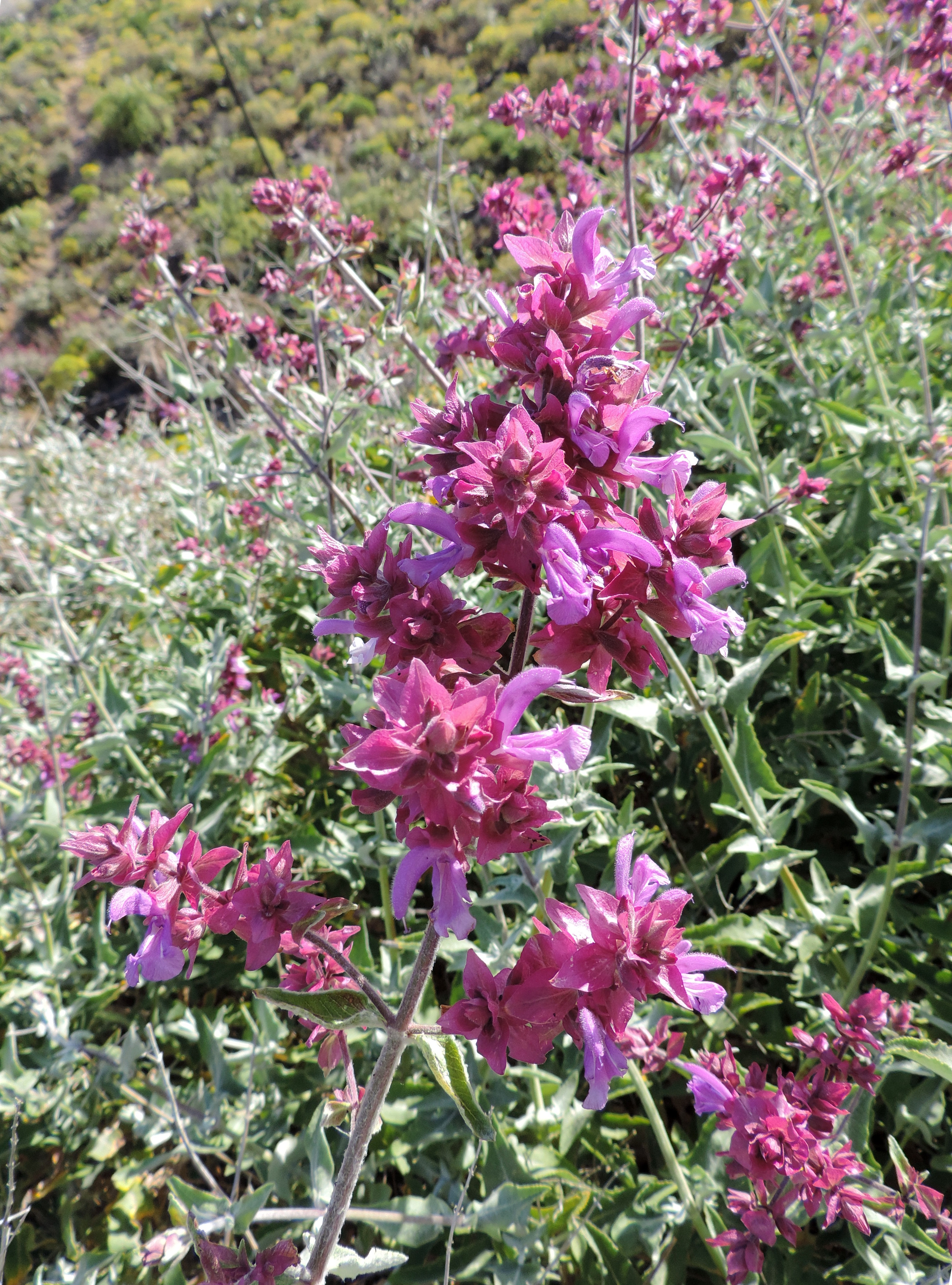

Scientific classification
- Kingdom: Plantae
- Clade: Tracheophytes
- Clade: Angiosperms
- Clade: Eudicots
- Clade: Asterids
- Order: Lamiales
- Family: Lamiaceae
- Genus: Salvia
- Species: S. canariensis

Binomial name
- Salvia canariensis L.

= Salvia canariensis =

Species of flowering plant

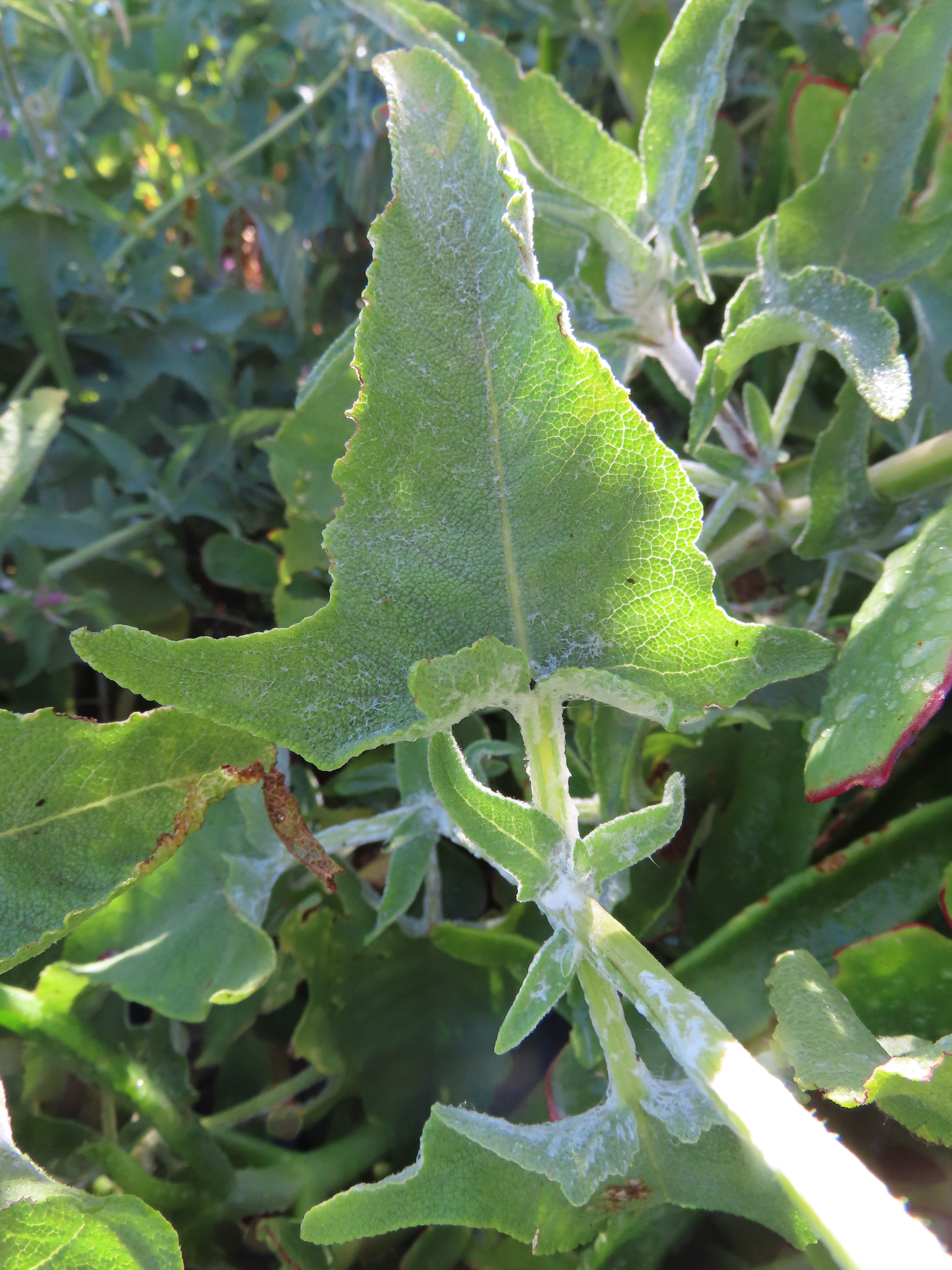
Hastate leaves of Salvia canariensis

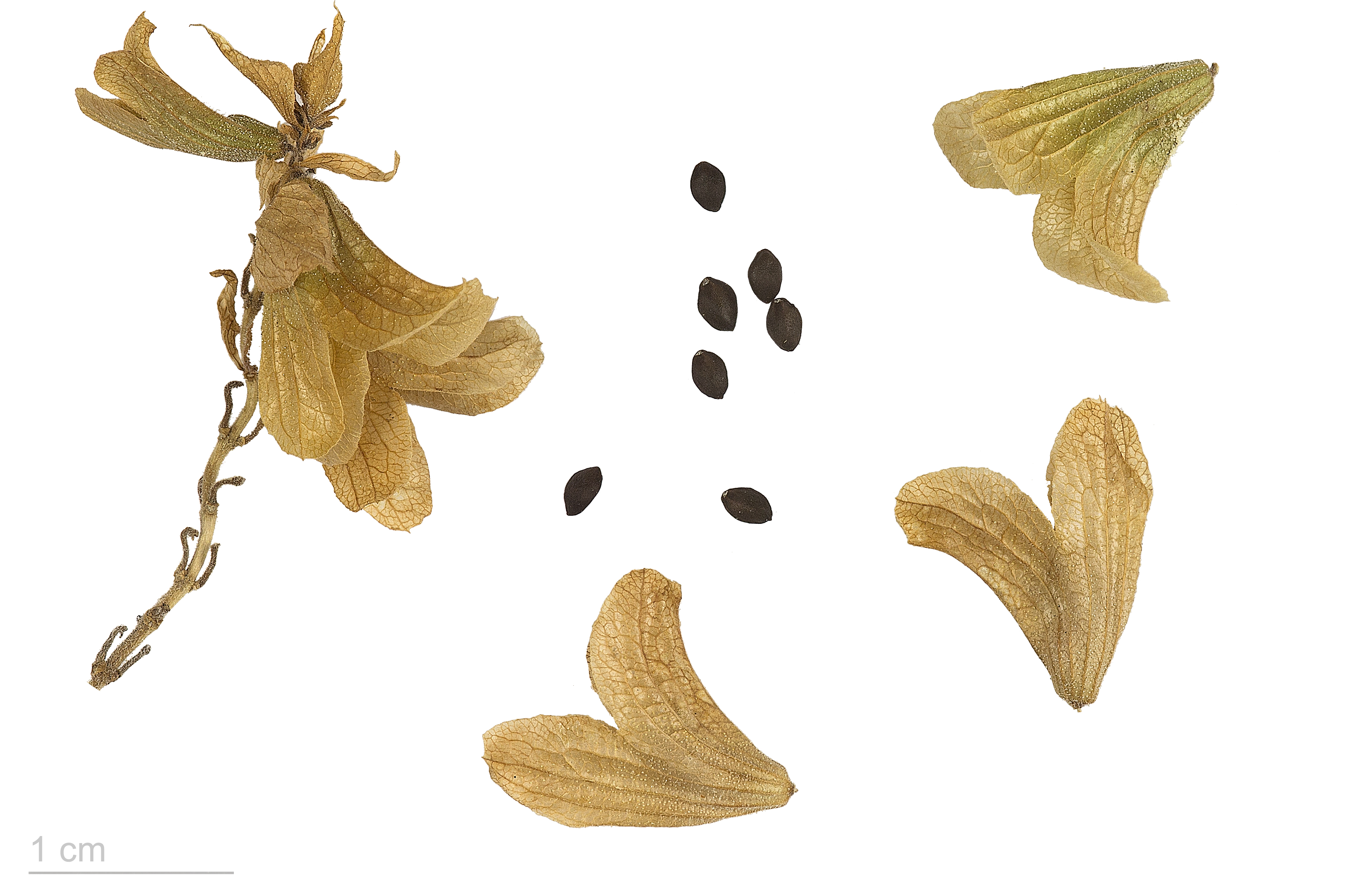
Reproductive anatomy of Salvia canariensis

Salvia canariensis, the Canary Island sage, is an erect perennial shrub native to the Canary Islands. It can reach 2.0–2.3 m in height and 1.5 m width in a single season. The hastate leaves are pale green, and the stems and underside of the leaves are covered with long white hairs. The flowers range from pale purple to deep purple magenta.
