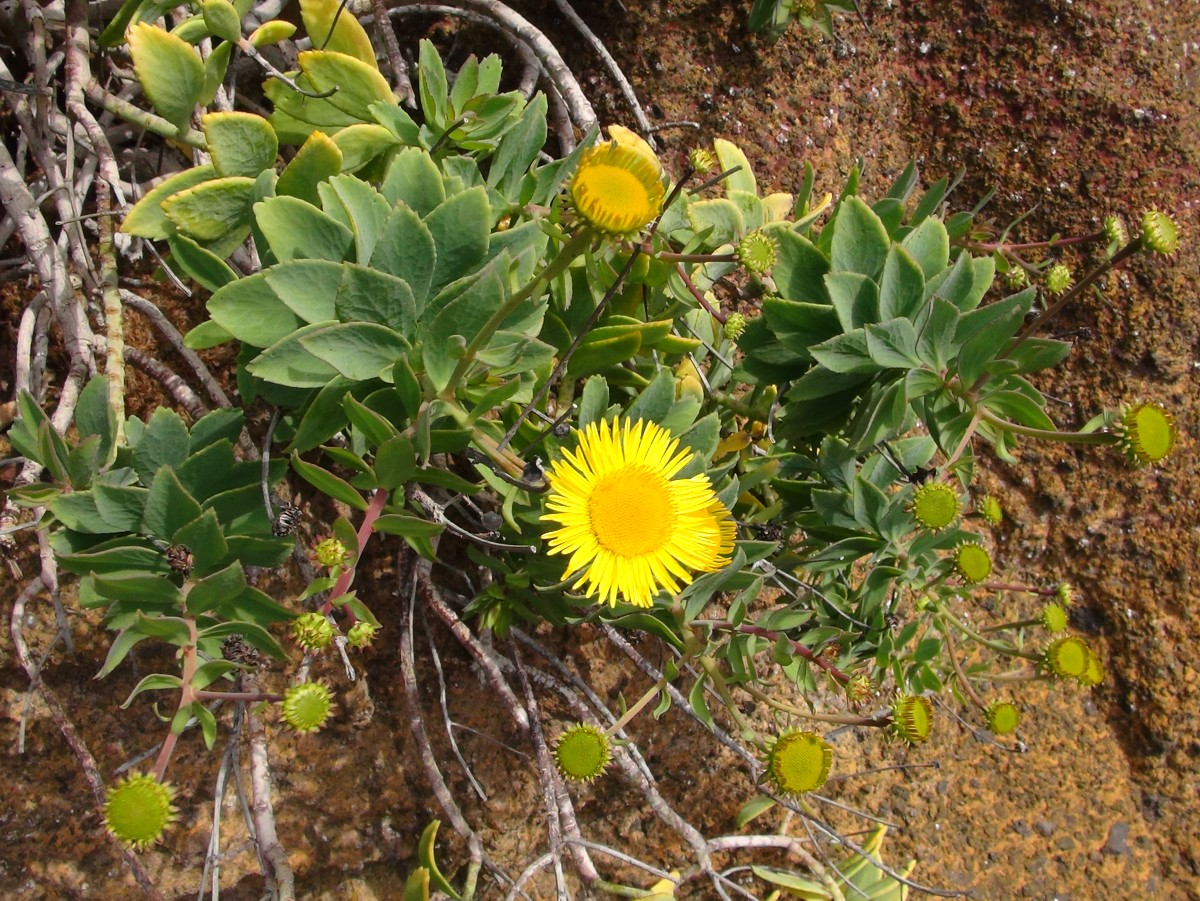

Scientific classification
- Kingdom: Plantae
- Clade: Tracheophytes
- Clade: Angiosperms
- Clade: Eudicots
- Clade: Asterids
- Order: Asterales
- Family: Asteraceae
- Subfamily: Asteroideae
- Tribe: Inuleae
- Genus: Vieraea; Webb ex Sch.Bip.
- Species: V. laevigata

Binomial name
- Vieraea laevigata (Willd.) Webb ex Sch.Bip.

Synonyms
- Vieria Webb ex Sch.Bip., alternate spelling; Buphthalmum laevigatum Brouss. ex Willd.; Jasonia laevigata (Willd.) DC.; Donia canariensis Less.; Buphthalmum coriaceum Hort. ex Loudon

= Vieraea =

Genus of flowering plants

Vieraea is a genus of Canary Island plants in the tribe Inuleae within the family Asteraceae.

Species

The only known species is Vieraea laevigata, native to Tenerife Island.
