= Tower of jewels =

Tower of jewels may refer to:

- Echium simplex, a plant native to Tenerife, Canary Islands
- Echium virescens, a plant native to Tenerife, Canary Islands
- Echium wildpretii, a plant native to Tenerife, Canary Islands
- Tower of Jewels (Lakeside Amusement Park), a building at an amusement park near Denver, Colorado
- Tower of Jewels (Panama–Pacific International Exposition), a building at the 1915 world's fair in San Francisco, California
- The Tower of Jewels, a 1919 American crime drama film directed by Tom Terriss
