= E. maritimum =

E. maritimum may refer to:

- Erodium maritimum, the sea storksbill, a plant species in the genus Erodium
- Eryngium maritimum, the sea holly, a plant species in the family Apiaceae

== Synonyms ==
- Echium maritimum, a synonym for Echium sabulicola, the sand viper's gloss, a plant species

== See also ==
- Maritimum (disambiguation)
