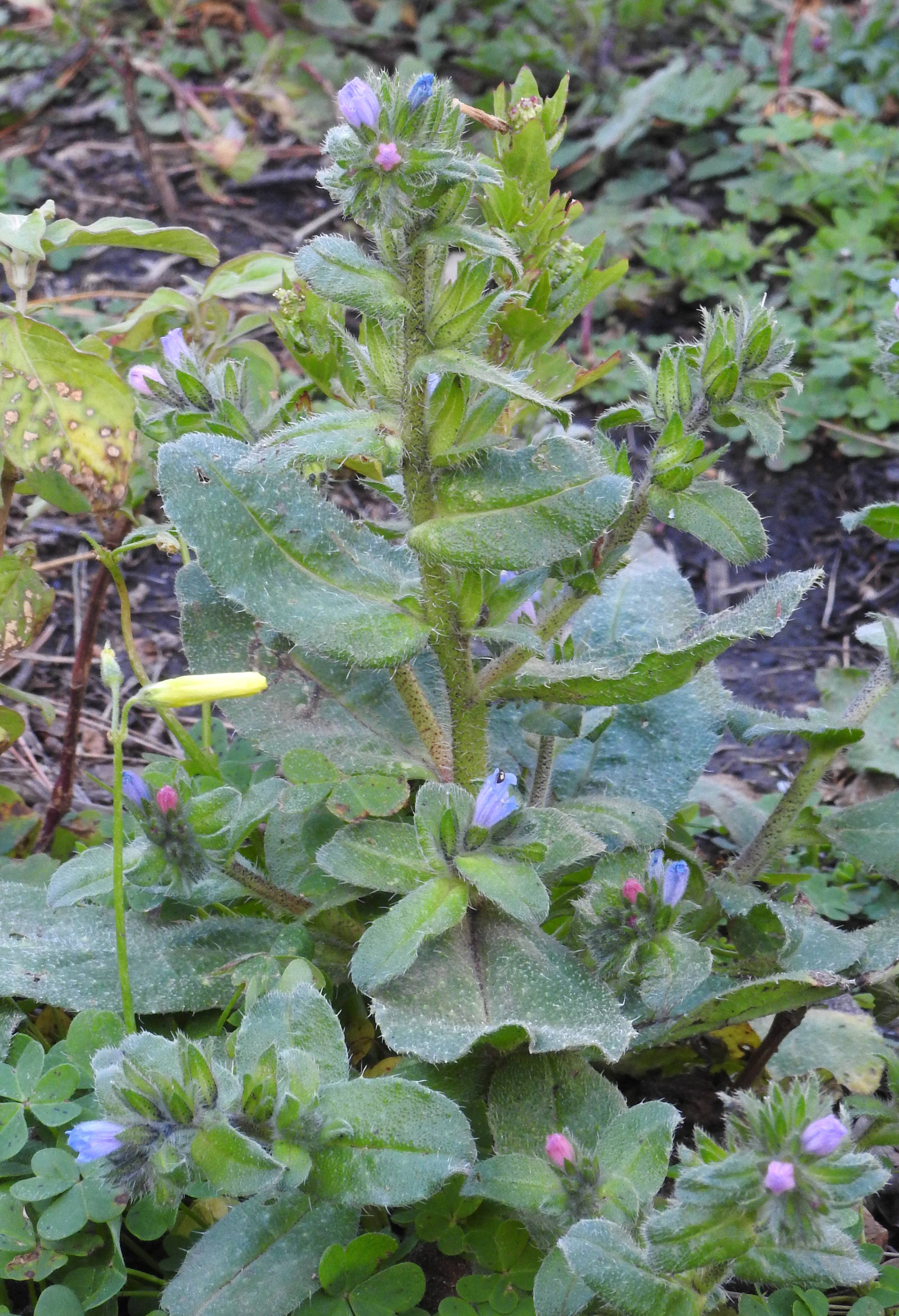

Scientific classification
- Kingdom: Plantae
- Clade: Tracheophytes
- Clade: Angiosperms
- Clade: Eudicots
- Clade: Asterids
- Order: Boraginales
- Family: Boraginaceae
- Genus: Echium
- Species: E. parviflorum

Binomial name
- Echium parviflorum Moench

= Echium parviflorum =

Species of flowering plant

Echium parviflorum is a species of plant in the family Boraginaceae native to the Mediterranean Basin.
