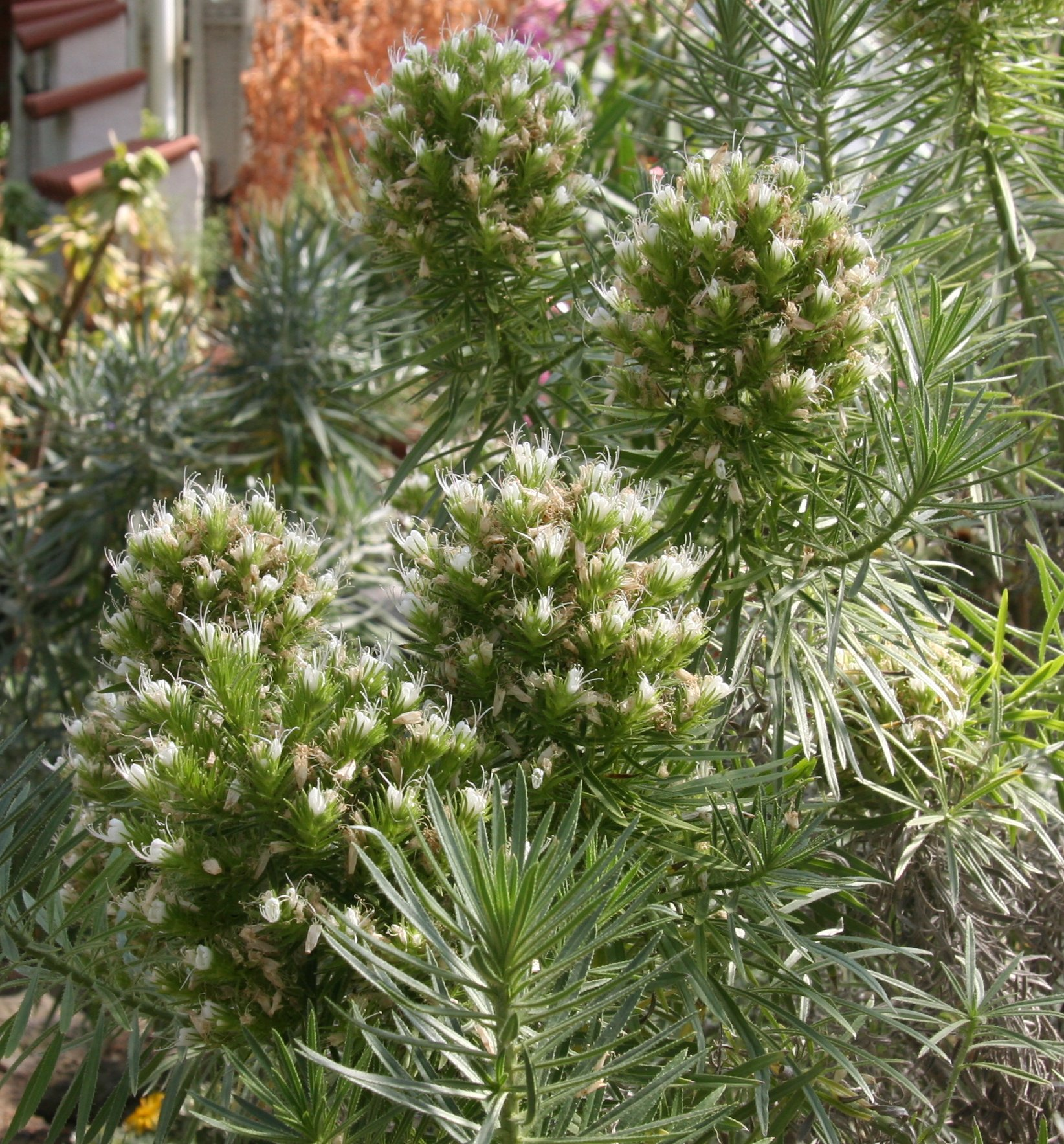

Scientific classification
- Kingdom: Plantae
- Clade: Tracheophytes
- Clade: Angiosperms
- Clade: Eudicots
- Clade: Asterids
- Order: Boraginales
- Family: Boraginaceae
- Genus: Echium
- Species: E. aculeatum

Binomial name
- Echium aculeatum Poir.

= Echium aculeatum =

Species of flowering plant

Echium aculeatum is a species of flowering plant of the family Boraginaceae. It is endemic to the Canary Islands, where it occurs on the islands El Hierro, La Palma, La Gomera and Tenerife. Its name in Spanish is ajinajo.

It is a branched shrub with thorny leaves and white flowers.
