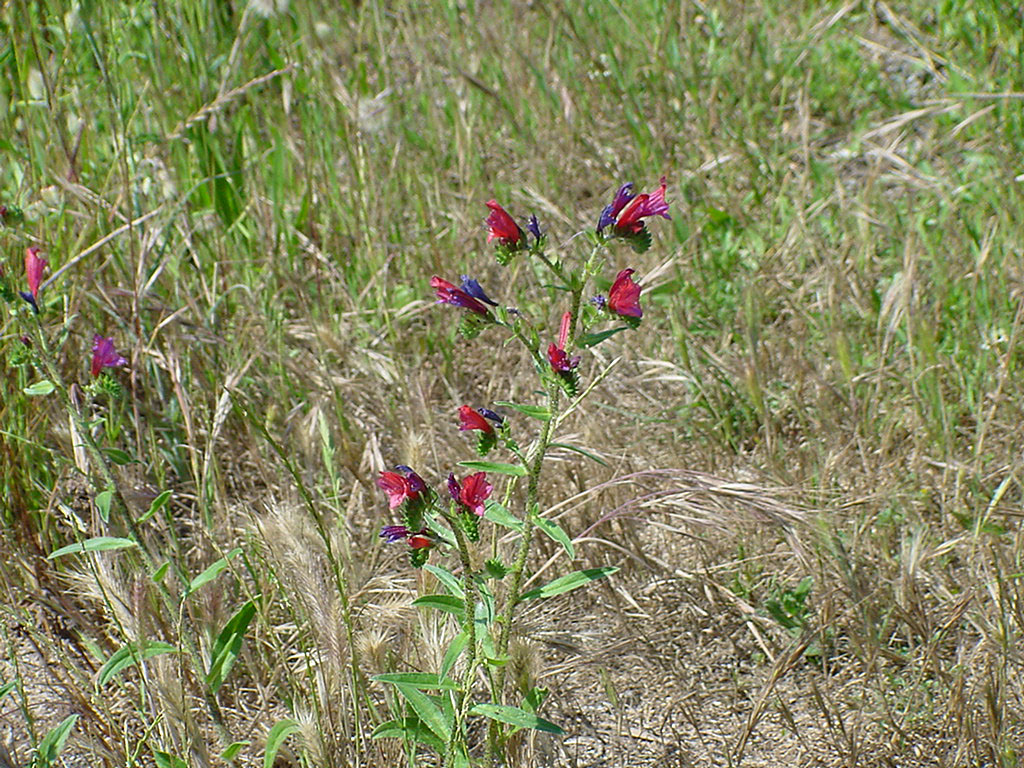

Scientific classification
- Kingdom: Plantae
- Clade: Tracheophytes
- Clade: Angiosperms
- Clade: Eudicots
- Clade: Asterids
- Order: Boraginales
- Family: Boraginaceae
- Genus: Echium
- Species: E. creticum

Binomial name
- Echium creticum L.

= Echium creticum =

Cretan viper's bugloss

Species of flowering plant

Echium creticum, the Cretan viper's bugloss, (syn. Echium calycinum Viv., Echium rubrum Moench, Echium sericeum Vahl, Echium violaceum L.) is a species of flowering plant in the family Boraginaceae. It is native to the western Mediterranean Basin. It is also used as an ornamental plant.
