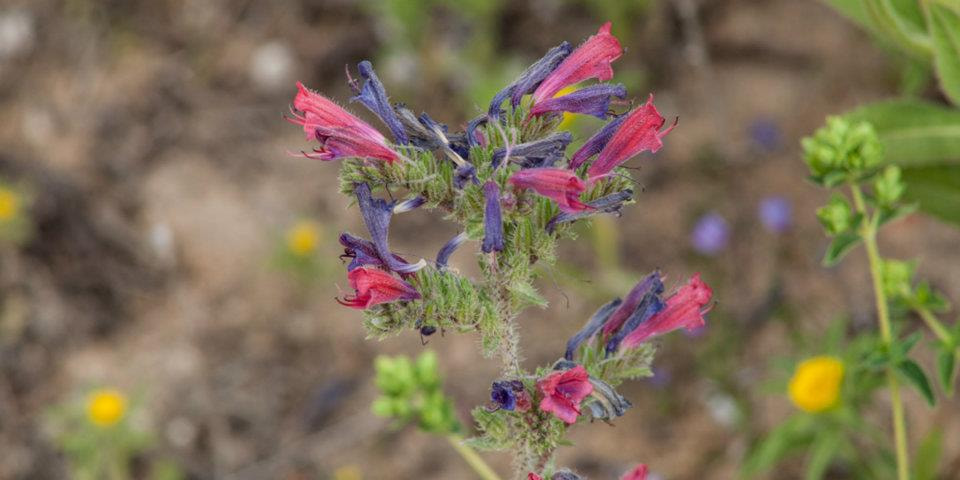

Scientific classification
- Kingdom: Plantae
- Clade: Tracheophytes
- Clade: Angiosperms
- Clade: Eudicots
- Clade: Asterids
- Order: Boraginales
- Family: Boraginaceae
- Genus: Echium
- Species: E. tuberculatum

Binomial name
- Echium tuberculatum Hoffm. & Link

= Echium tuberculatum =

Species of flowering plant

Echium tuberculatum is a species of flowering plant native to Portugal, Morocco, Algeria and Libya in the Iberian Peninsula and North Africa respectively. This plant is a hardy garden perennial and it forms a sprawling mass of red flowers during the whole of the summer.

It will self-seed readily.
