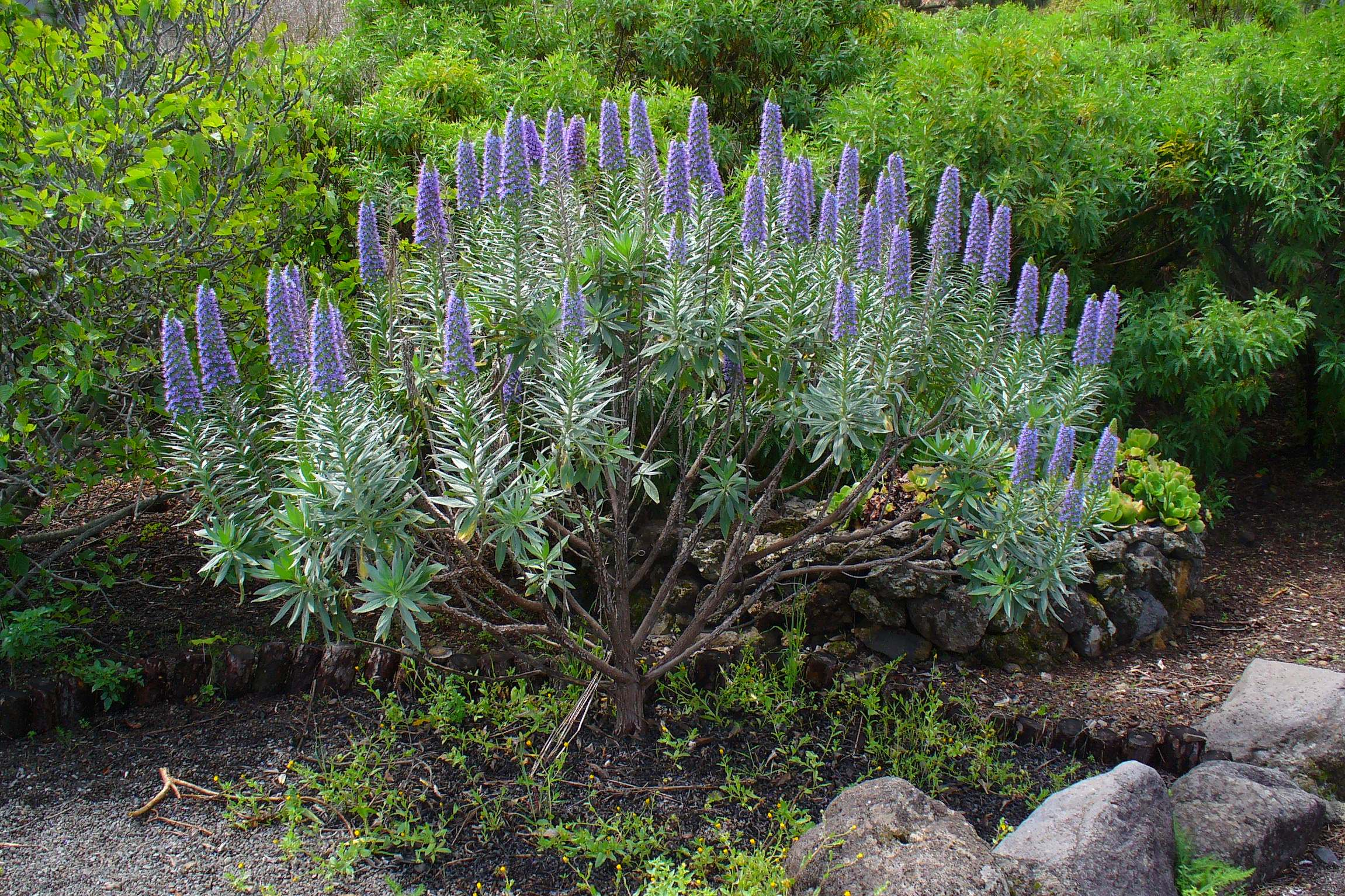

Scientific classification
- Kingdom: Plantae
- Clade: Tracheophytes
- Clade: Angiosperms
- Clade: Eudicots
- Clade: Asterids
- Order: Boraginales
- Family: Boraginaceae
- Genus: Echium
- Species: E. webbii

Binomial name
- Echium webbii Coincy

= Echium webbii =

Species of flowering plant

Echium webbii is a species of flowering plants of the family Boraginaceae. It is endemic to the Canary Islands, where it is restricted to the island of La Palma. The species was first described by Auguste-Henri de Coincy. The specific name webbii refers to botanist Philip Barker Webb.

The flowers are normally blue and produced in numerous spikes in early summer, but a hybrid is sometimes seen with white or pink flowers. It grows to average height 100 centimetres (39 in), maximum height 150 centimetres (59 in).

The plant is not very tolerant of cold, and in the wild is a shrub. It can be grown in gardens in mild areas, but requires good drainage.
