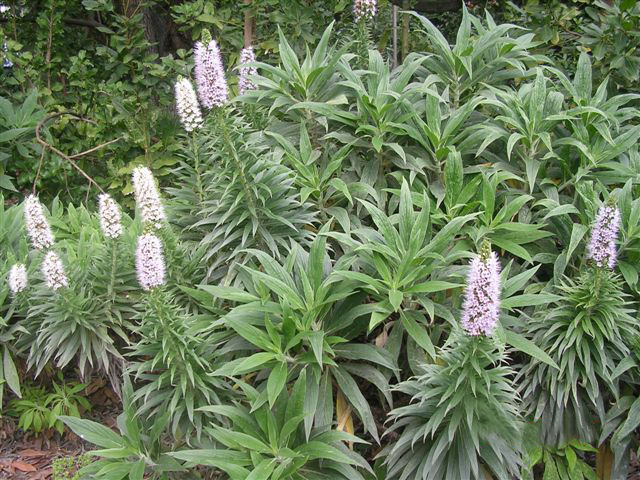

Scientific classification
- Kingdom: Plantae
- Clade: Tracheophytes
- Clade: Angiosperms
- Clade: Eudicots
- Clade: Asterids
- Order: Boraginales
- Family: Boraginaceae
- Genus: Echium
- Species: E. virescens

Binomial name
- Echium virescens DC.

= Echium virescens =

Species of flowering plant

Echium virescens is a flowering plant in the genus Echium. It is endemic to the island of Tenerife, mainly in Macizo de Anaga and the Orotava Valley. It grows in forests and on lower south slopes of the island.

== Description ==
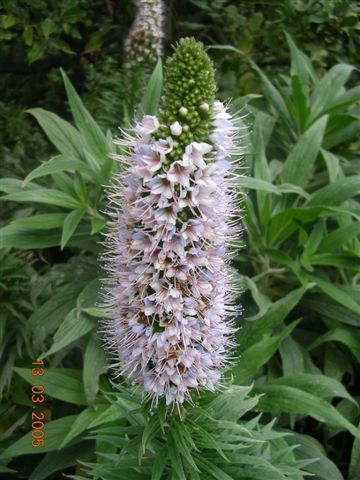
Echium virescens details of its floral corollas.

It is a herbaceous plant and grows up to 2 m in height and requires plenty of sun and good drainage. It is a branched, bushy plant. It grows in rosettes with several dense and cylindrical inflorescences. These tops are forked, unlike the Echium webbii of the island of La Palma, that has simple lateral tops. It has dense foliage with green-grey leaves. These are thick and persistent, lanceolate, at the base, and smaller throughout the inflorescence, with hairs on both sides.

It has pale blue or pink flowers from the end of winter to the beginning of spring. The sepals of the flowers are fused at the base.

== Uses ==
This plant is used in gardens. The plant are used for beekeeping, as it is rich in pollen and nectar.
