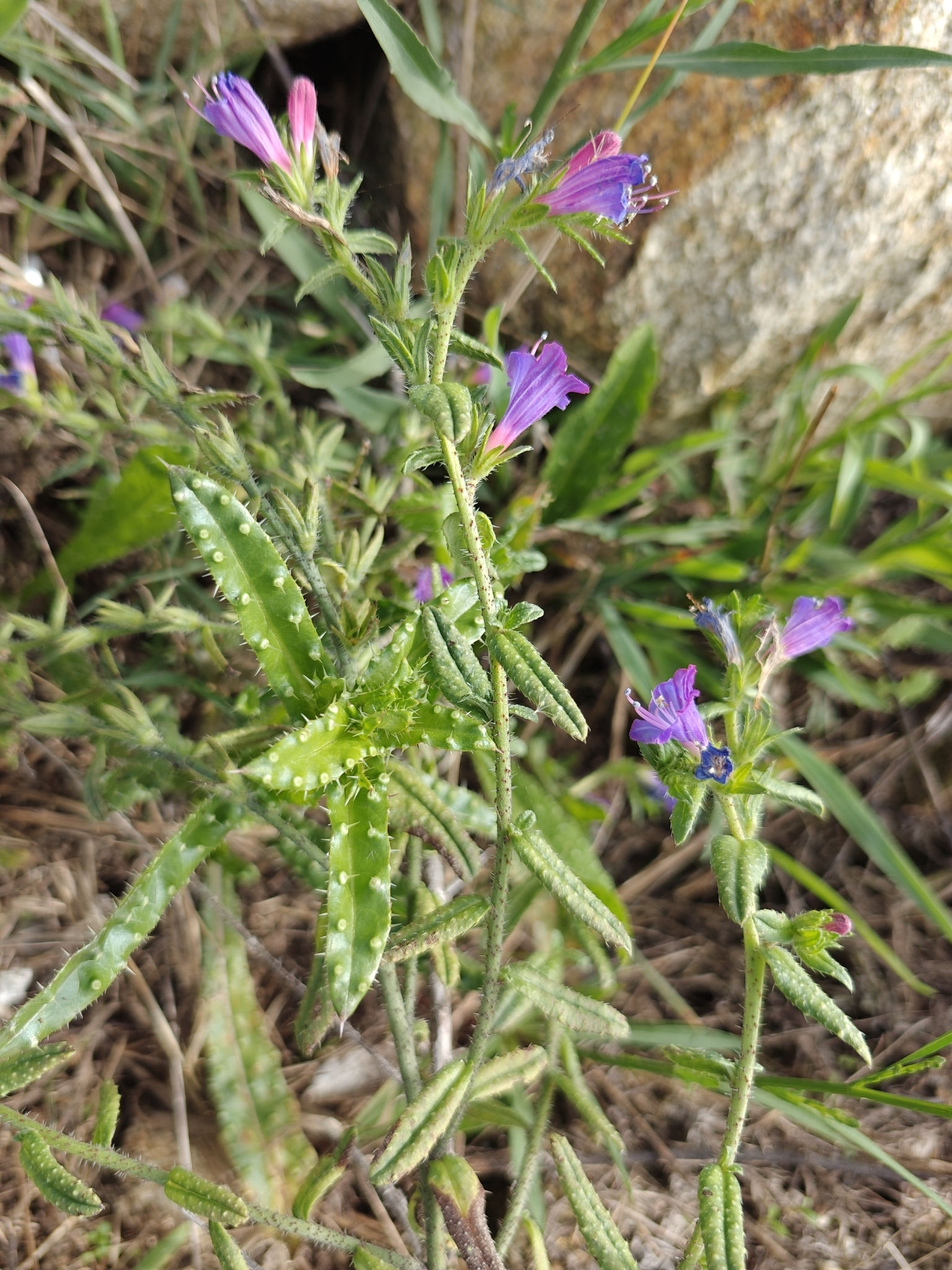
- Echium rosulatum

Scientific classification
- Kingdom: Plantae
- Clade: Tracheophytes
- Clade: Angiosperms
- Clade: Eudicots
- Clade: Asterids
- Order: Boraginales
- Family: Boraginaceae
- Genus: Echium
- Species: E. rosulatum

Binomial name
- Echium rosulatum Lange

= Echium rosulatum =

Species of plant

Echium rosulatum is a species of flowering plant in the family Boraginaceae. It is endemic to the western portion of the Iberian Peninsula in Portugal, Galicia (Spain) and the Sierra Morena. It favors acidic and somewhat nitrified soil. It has two subspecies, one native to mainland Iberia and the other one (subsp. davaei) native to the Berlengas archipelago.

== Description ==
Echium rosulatum is a perennial and generally multi-stemmed plant with decumbent or ascending stems. Leaves are partly to fully sericeous with scant indumentum, few setae and short hairs. The basal leaves are elliptic or oblanceolate, they form a rosette and have a slightly marked petiole. The stem leaves range from oblong or elliptic in the middle, to narrowly ovate or ovate-lanceolate in the upper portion.

=== Inflorescence ===
The inflorescence is panicled, loose, with cymes around 13 cm (up to 18 cm (5.1 to 7.1 in)) when fruiting. Flowers are zygomorphic. The bracts are ovate-lanceolate and are longer than the calyx. The funnel-shaped corolla is 15–25 mm (0.59–0.98 in) long (up to 30 mm) and is covered in small hairs in almost all its surface, with some longer hairs on the nerves. Three to four stamens (two in certain cases) are exerted from the corolla. The stamens' filaments are whitish and sparsely hairy. At least two of the ovoid, bluish-brown anthers are exerted. The style is hairy and longer than the corolla.
