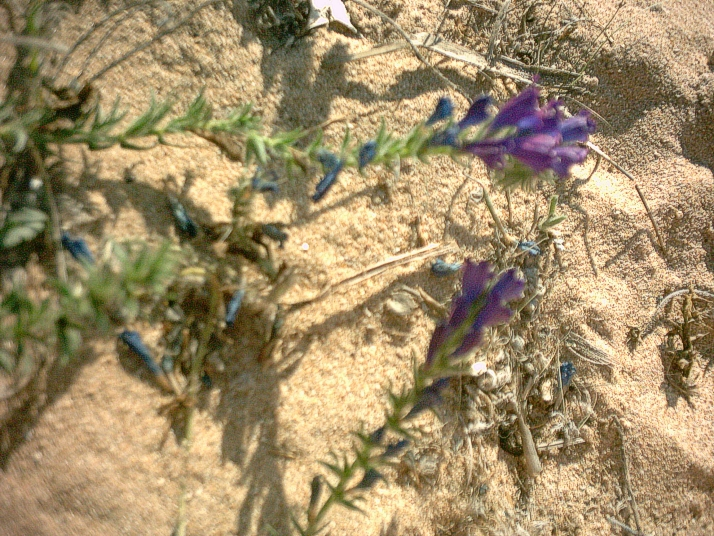

Scientific classification
- Kingdom: Plantae
- Clade: Tracheophytes
- Clade: Angiosperms
- Clade: Eudicots
- Clade: Asterids
- Order: Boraginales
- Family: Boraginaceae
- Genus: Echium
- Species: E. sabulicola

Binomial name
- Echium sabulicola Pomel, 1874

= Echium sabulicola =

Species of flowering plant

Echium sabulicola (syn. Echium confusum Coincy, Echium maritimum Willd.) is a plant in the genus Echium. It is a herbaceous biennial plant and grows up to 70 centimetres (28 in) in height. It is native to the sandy areas of the coasts of the western Mediterranean region from Spain east to southern France and Italy, including the Balearic Islands, Corsica, Sardinia and Sicily. The plant requires dry air and exposure to the sun.

The flowers have five sepals. Zygomorphous corolla of 12–22 millimetres (0.47–0.87 in) in width and has five petals. The plant blooms in the end of April and can bloom again in the autumn months with favourable weather.
