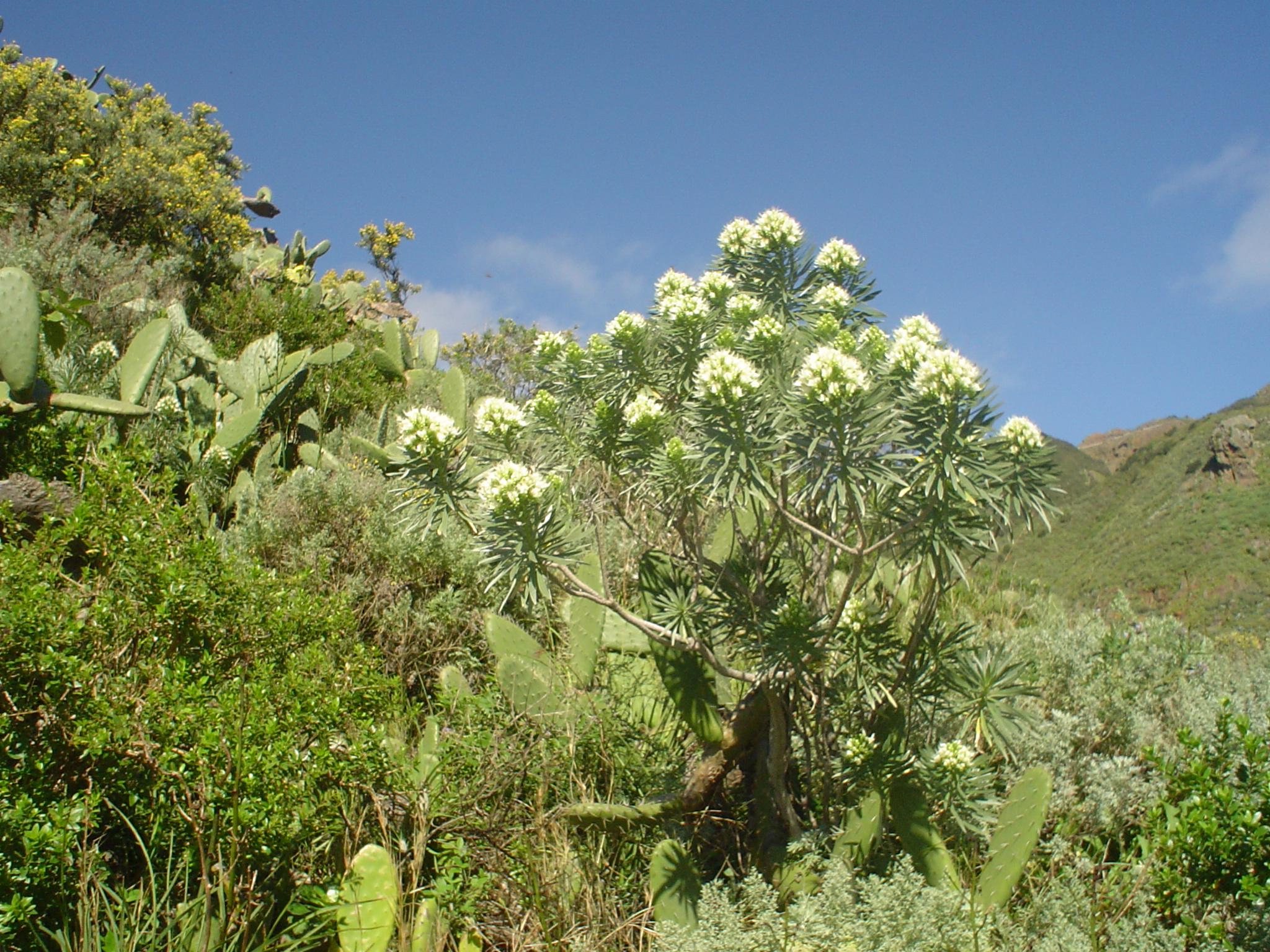
- Echium leucophaeum at San Andrés, Tenerife Island

Scientific classification
- Kingdom: Plantae
- Clade: Tracheophytes
- Clade: Angiosperms
- Clade: Eudicots
- Clade: Asterids
- Order: Boraginales
- Family: Boraginaceae
- Genus: Echium
- Species: E. leucophaeum

Binomial name
- Echium leucophaeum Webb ex Sprague & Hutch.

Synonyms
- Echium aculeatum var. leucophaeum (Webb) Christ; Echium giganteum var. leucophaeum (Webb) Bornm.

= Echium leucophaeum =

Species of flowering plant

Echium leucophaeum is a species of flowering plants of the family Boraginaceae. It is endemic to the Canary Islands, where it is restricted to the island of Tenerife. Its name in Spanish is taginaste de Anaga. The specific name leucophaeum is from Greek and means "greyish white".

== Description ==
It is a strongly branching woody shrub, average height 120 centimetres (47 in), maximum height 200 centimetres (79 in). The leaves are leathery and lance-shaped. Its flowers are white to rosy white and sit in a medium-sized inflorescence.
