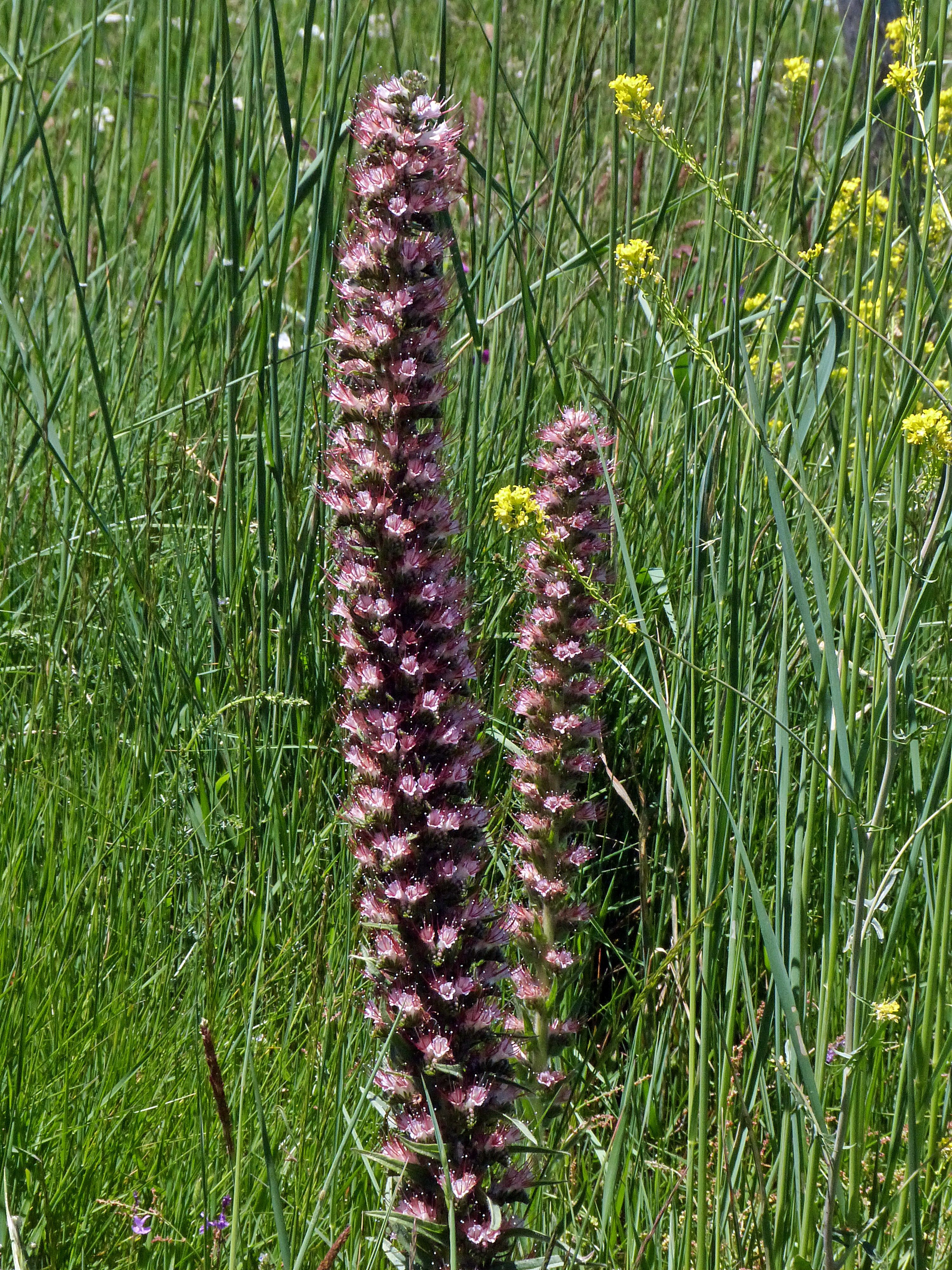

Scientific classification
- Kingdom: Plantae
- Clade: Tracheophytes
- Clade: Angiosperms
- Clade: Eudicots
- Clade: Asterids
- Order: Boraginales
- Family: Boraginaceae
- Genus: Echium
- Species: E. boissieri

Binomial name
- Echium boissieri Steud.

Synonyms
- Echium pomponium var. tangerinum Pau; Echium pomponium Boiss.; Echium pomponium var. velutinum Pau; Echium glomeratum Boiss.; Echium lagascae Boiss.; Echium albicans Schott ex Roem. & Schult.

= Echium boissieri =

Species of plant

Echium boissieri is a species of flowering plant in the borage family Boraginaceae. It is native to the western Mediterranean Basin in the Iberian Peninsula and Northwest Africa. It is single-stemmed and can reach up to 2.5 m (8 ft 2 in) in height.
