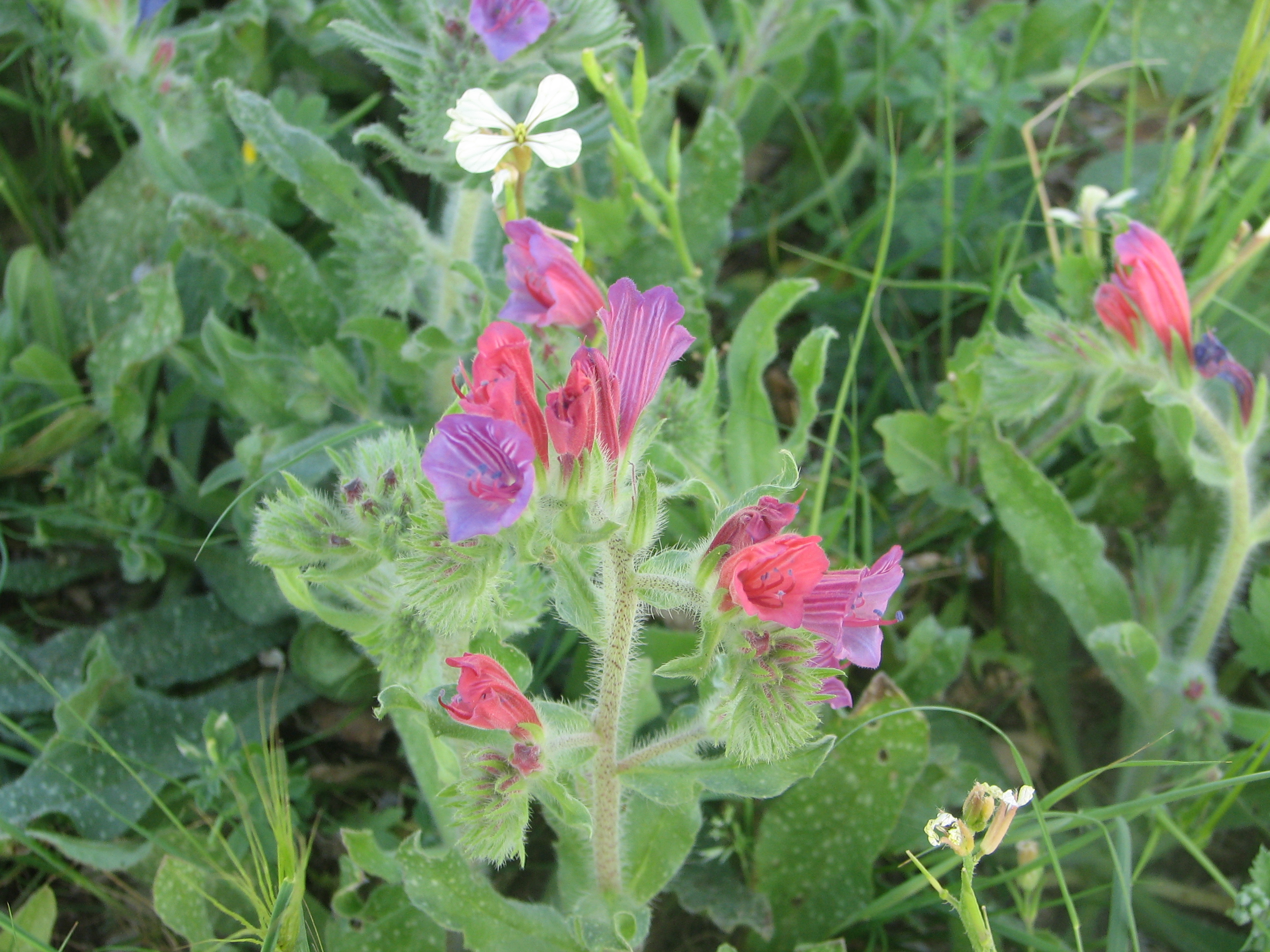

Scientific classification
- Kingdom: Plantae
- Clade: Tracheophytes
- Clade: Angiosperms
- Clade: Eudicots
- Clade: Asterids
- Order: Boraginales
- Family: Boraginaceae
- Genus: Echium
- Species: E. judaeum

Binomial name
- Echium judaeum Lacaita

Synonyms
- Echium judaicum Eig

= Echium judaeum =

Judean viper's bugloss

Species of flowering plant

Echium judaeum, commonly known as the Judean viper's bugloss, is an annual plant endemic to southern Lebanon, southern Syria, Israel and Jordan, of the Boraginaceae family, and which, like other herbaceous flowering plants of the same genus, derives its name from the style's resemblance to the forked-tongue of a serpent during the flower's pistillate-stage of development.

== Description ==
Echium judaeum grows to a height of about 50 cm (20 in), with funnel-shaped flowers that bloom between February and May. It is one of the few flowering plants where a lavender-coloured flower and a pink-coloured flower can be seen growing alongside each other from the same inflorescence. When revisiting the plant after a few days, the lavender-colour turns a deep purple, violet, or blue. This discoloration of the flower is said to happen after pollination. The flower is bisexual, with petals measuring 25–32 mm (1.0–1.3 in) in length.

The simple leaves and stems of the plant are completely covered with fine bristles that protrude from dark scales, and which makes touching unpleasant. In Arabic, the species of plant is known by the name Hyena's henna (Arabic: حنا الضبع, romanized: henna al-dhabaʿ). In Modern Hebrew, the plant is called "the serpent of Judah" (Hebrew: עכנאי יהודה, romanized: ʿakhnai yehudah).

== Habitat ==
The plant grows in shrub lands, but also appears in deserts. In Ottoman Palestine, the flower's pollen was harvested by honey bees in the production of honey.

== Gallery ==
Echium judaeum

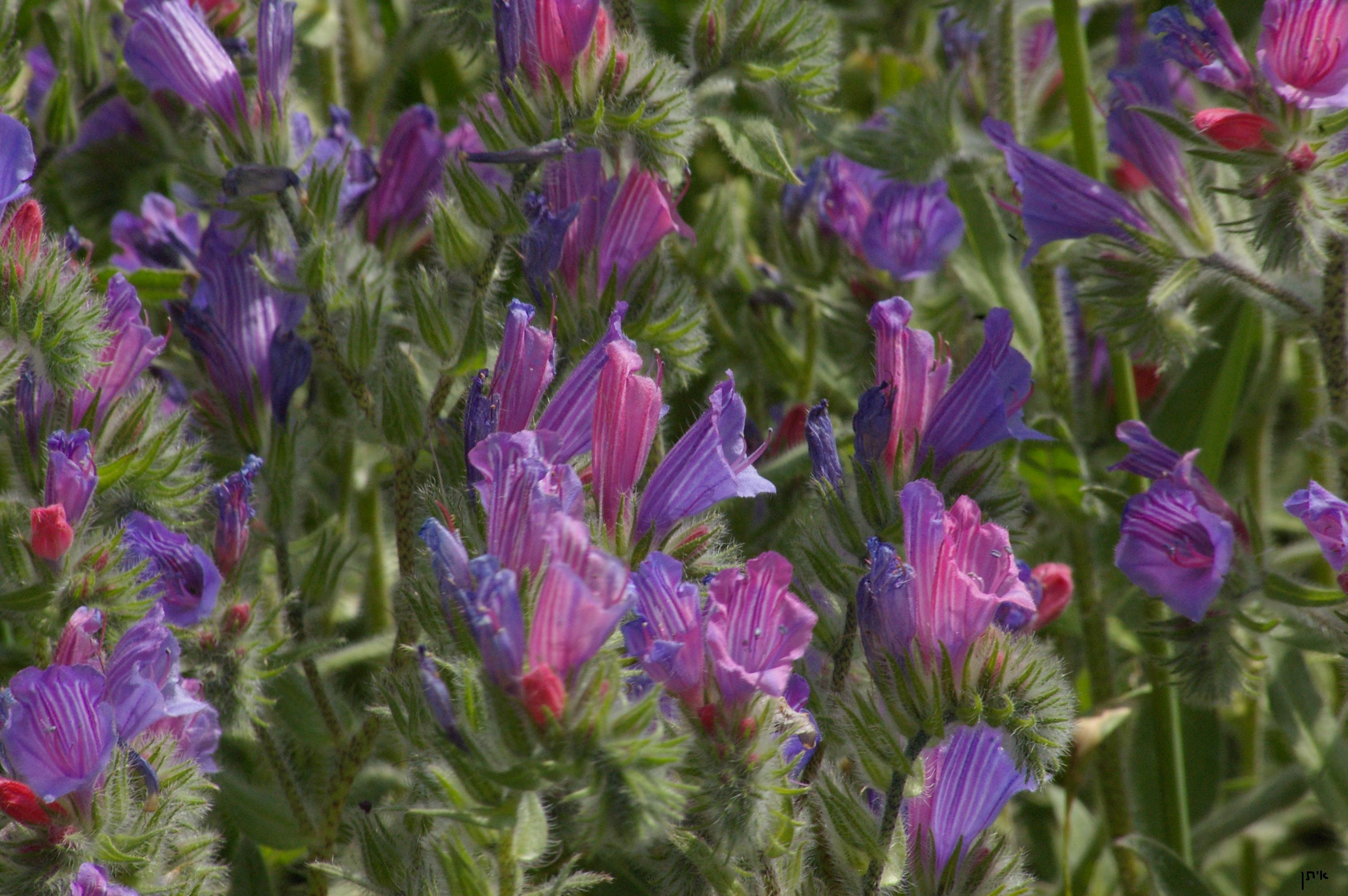
Lavender and pink floral arrangement

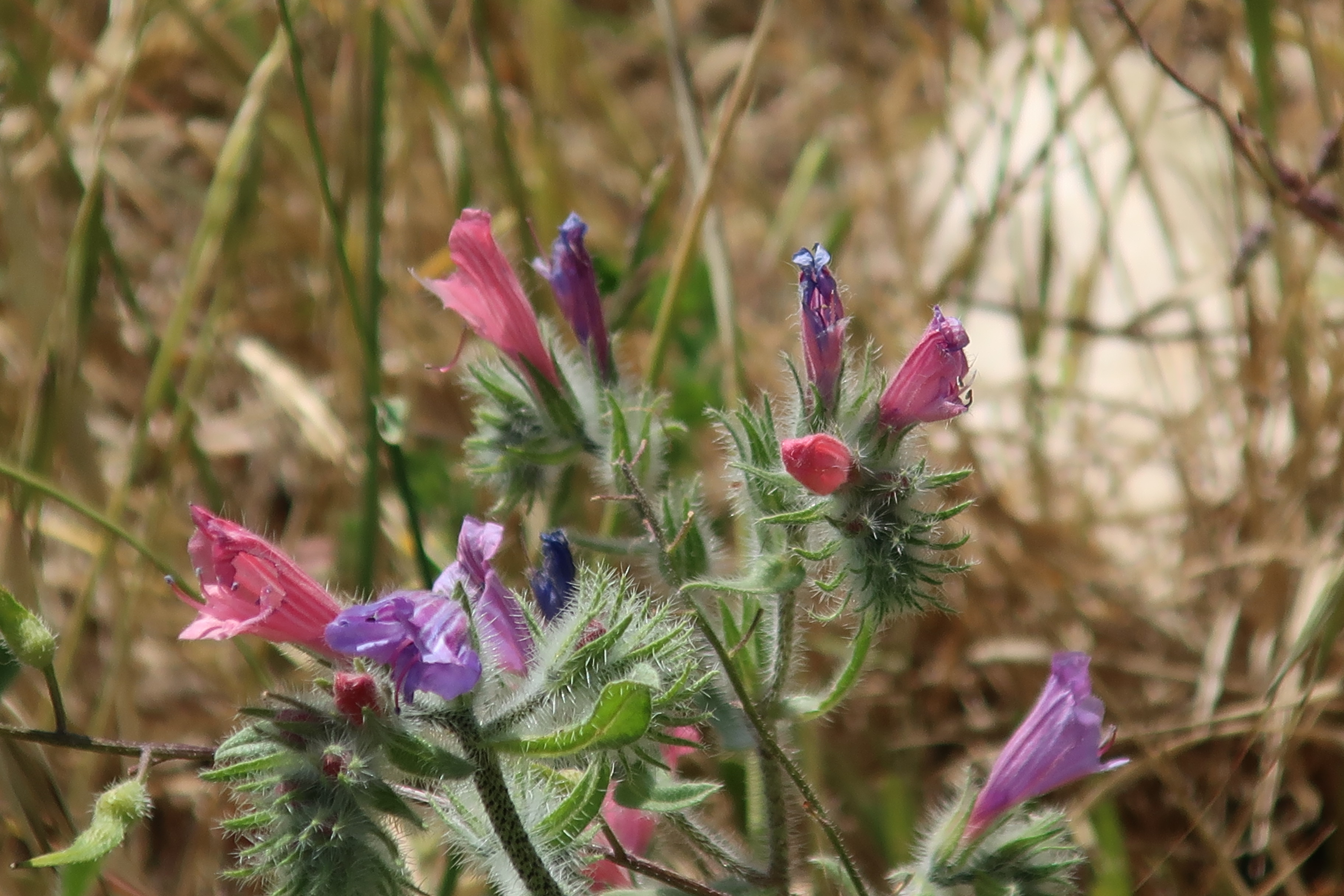
Echium judaeum in blossom

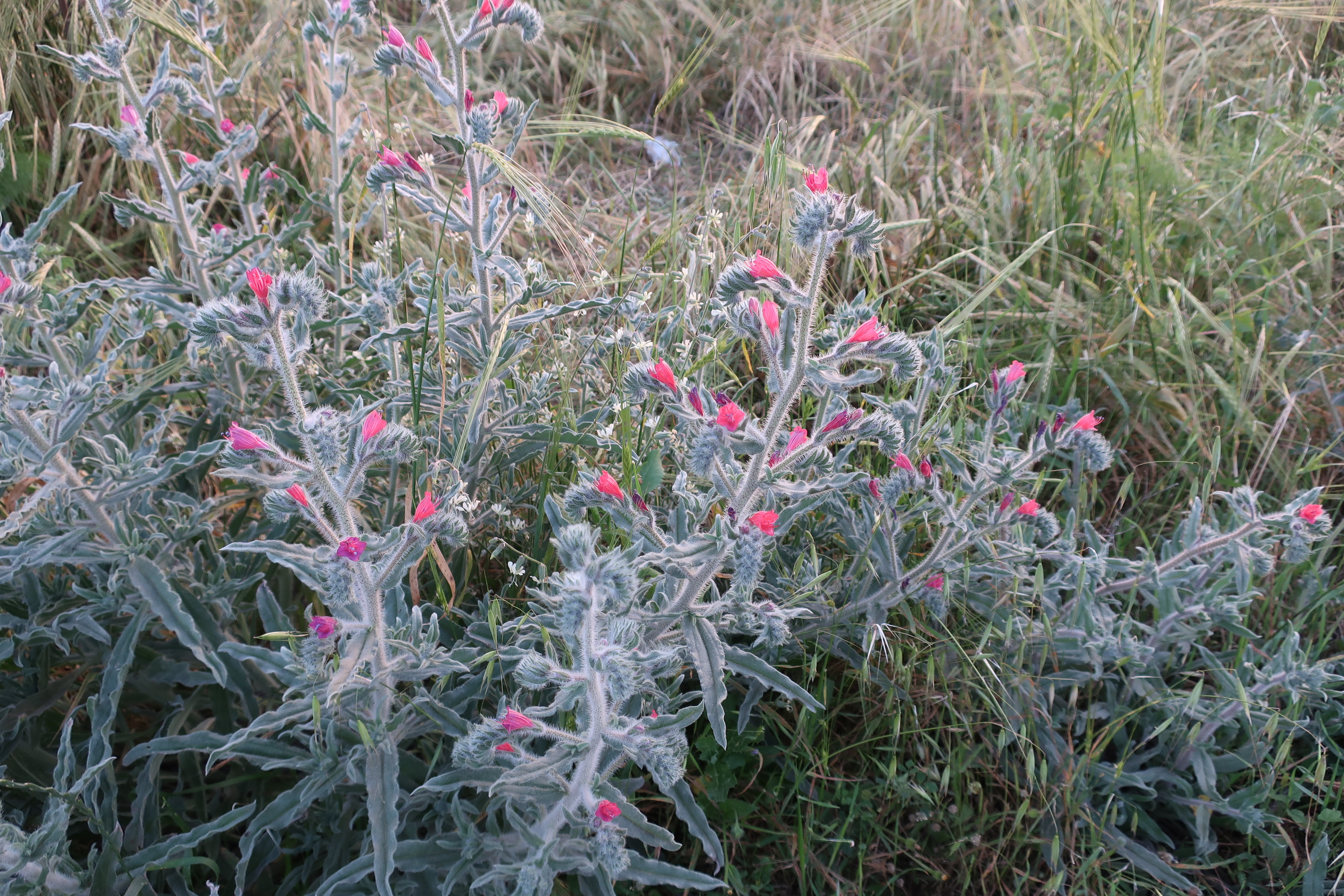
Judean viper's bugloss (Echium judaeum)

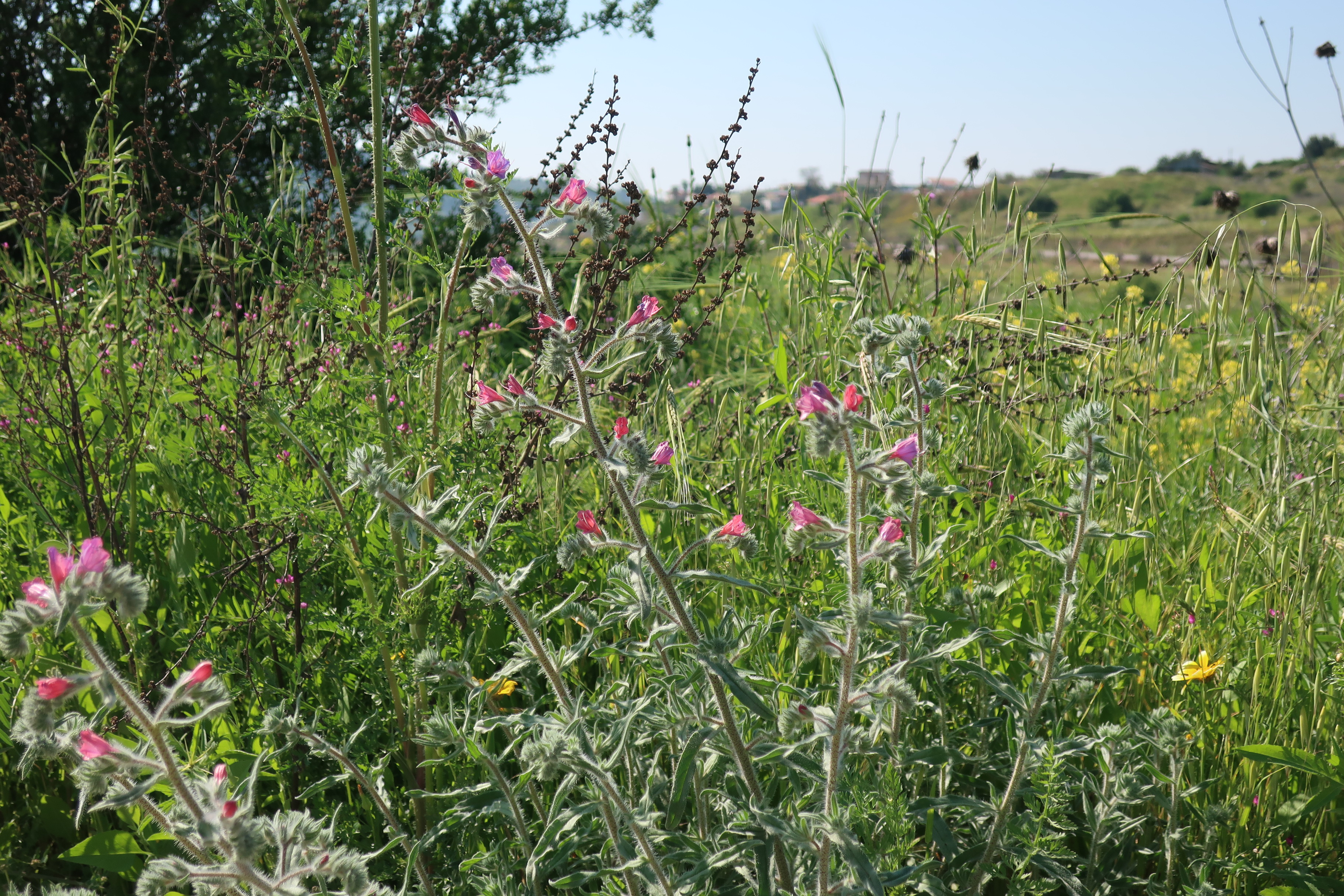
Pink blossoms of Echium judaeum

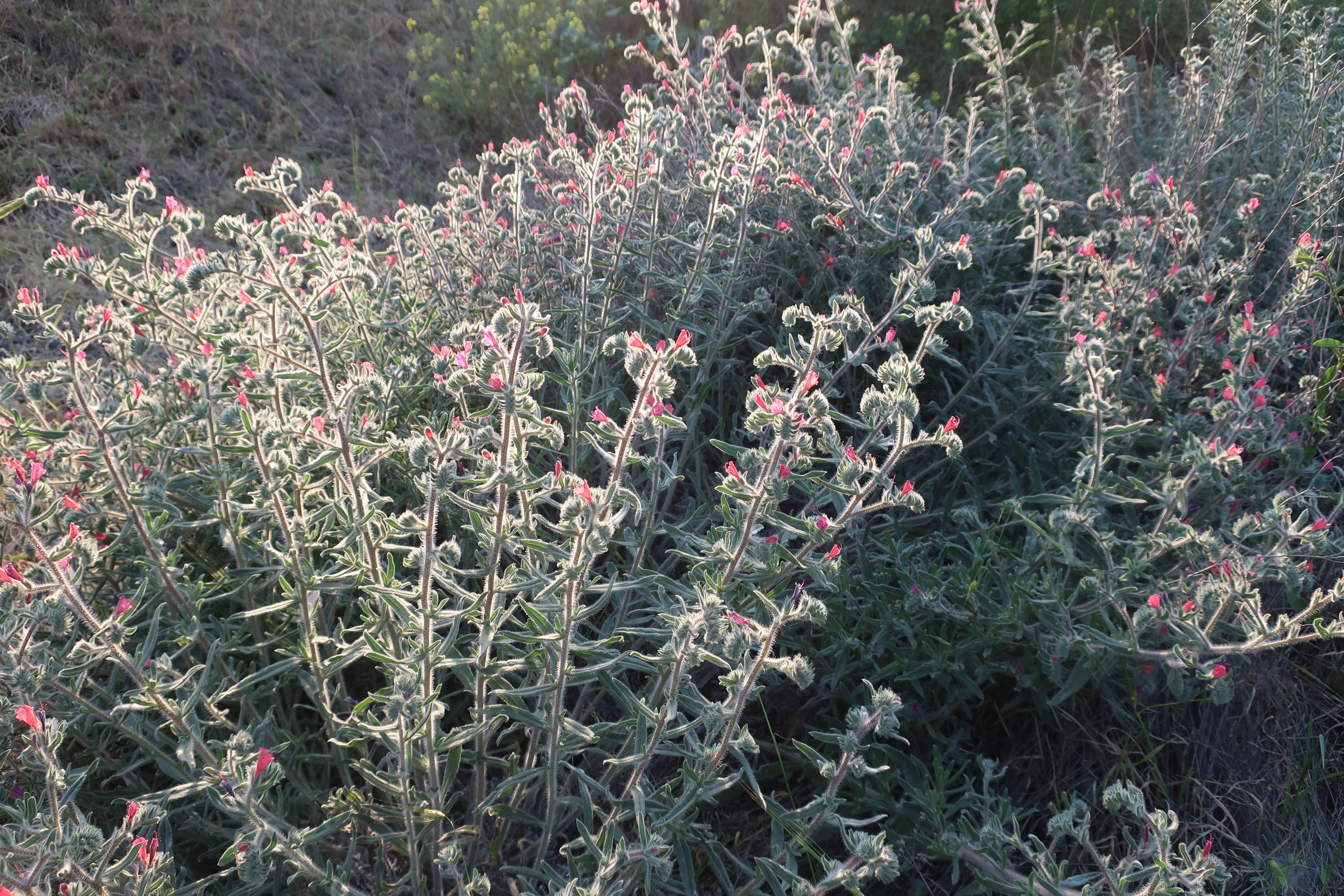
Israeli wild flowers

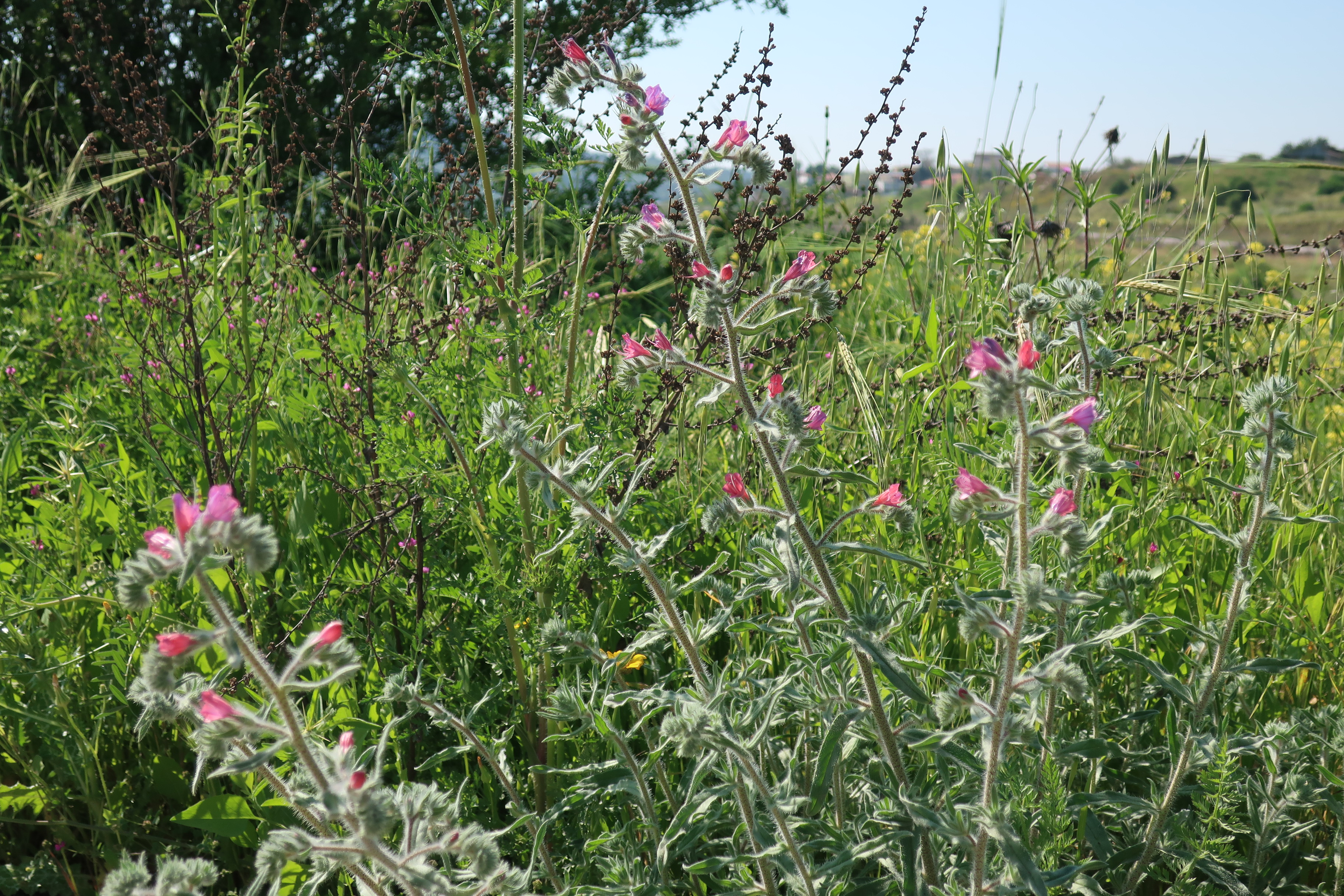
Pink florets of the Echium judaeum

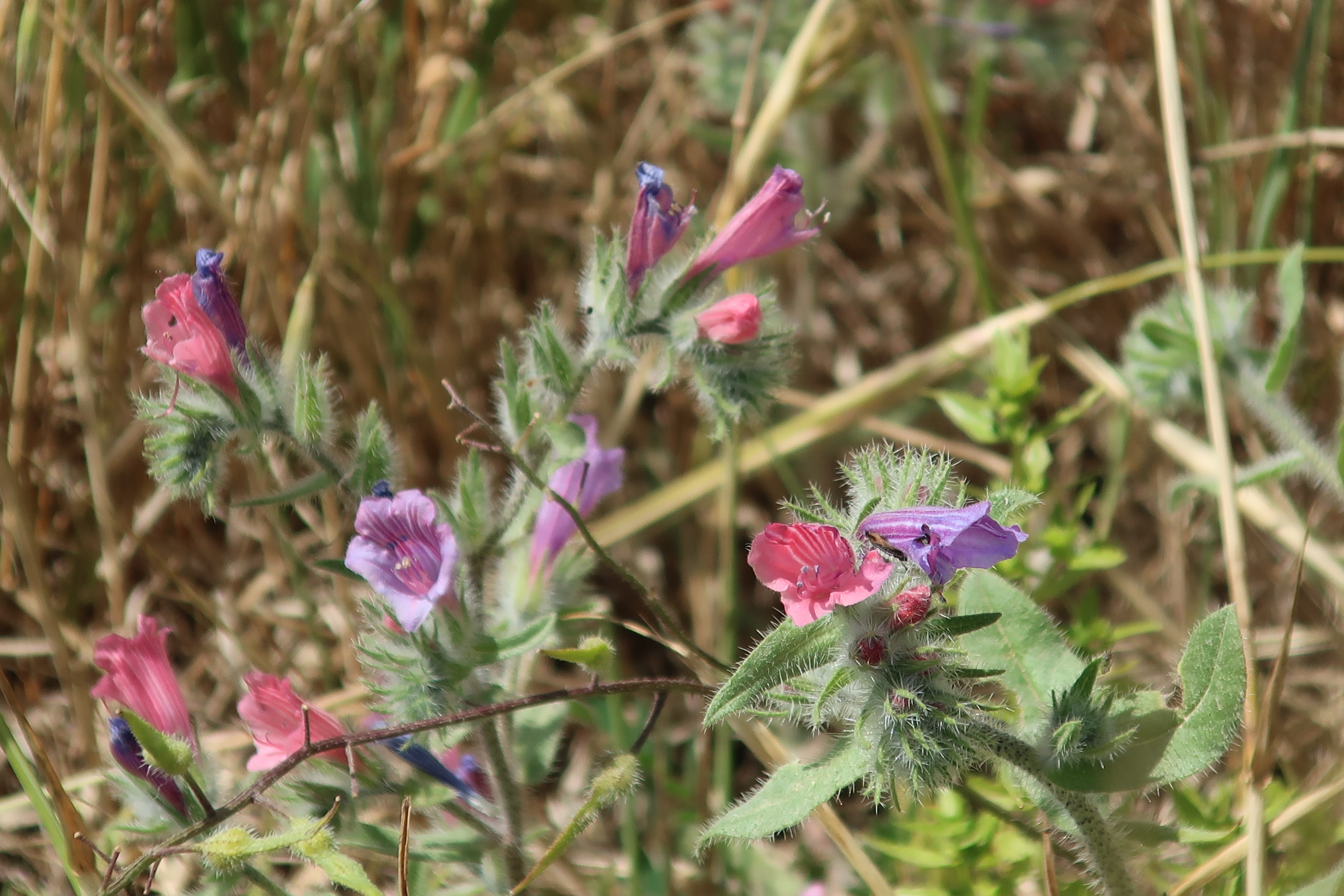
Lavenders and pinks

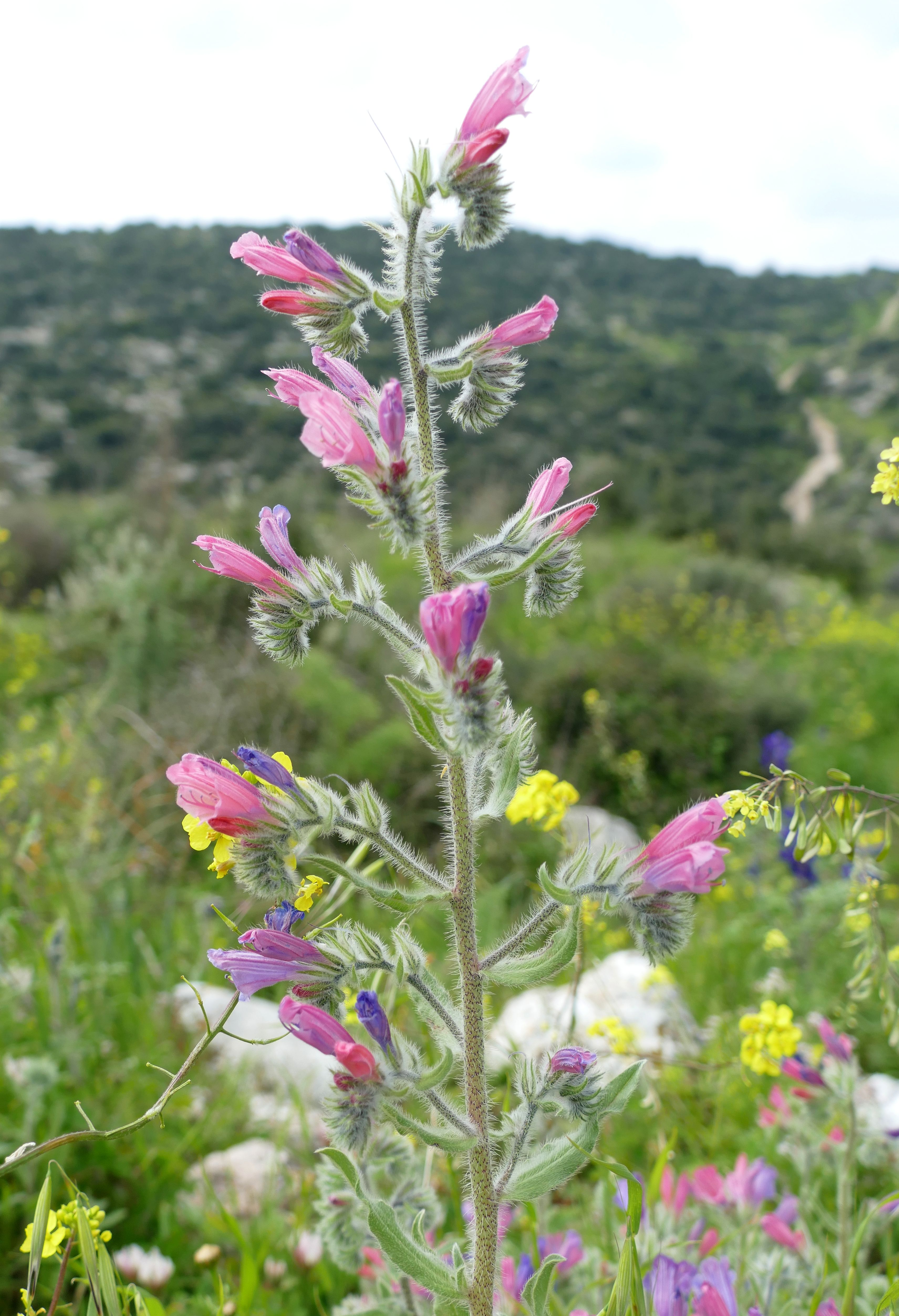
Flowering plant standing erect
