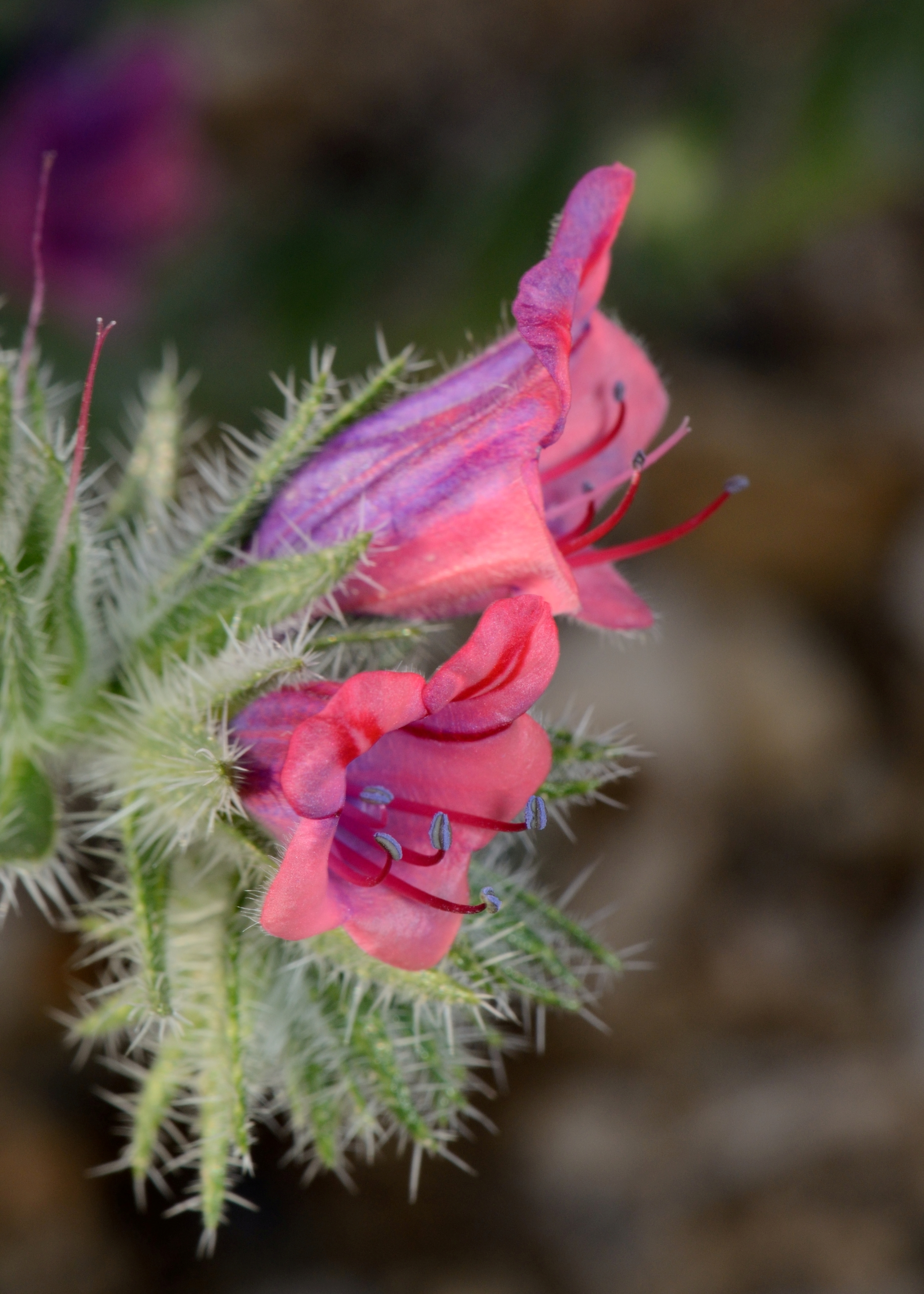

Scientific classification
- Kingdom: Plantae
- Clade: Tracheophytes
- Clade: Angiosperms
- Clade: Eudicots
- Clade: Asterids
- Order: Boraginales
- Family: Boraginaceae
- Genus: Echium
- Species: E. rauwolfii

Binomial name
- Echium rauwolfii Delile

Synonyms
- Echium dalmaticum Tausch; Echium margaritaceum Lehm. Echium pictum Jan ex Boiss. Echium tinctorium Viv.

= Echium rauwolfii =

Species of flowering plant

Echium rauwolfii is a species of flowering plant in the family Boraginaceae, whose native range is North Africa to the Arabian Peninsula.

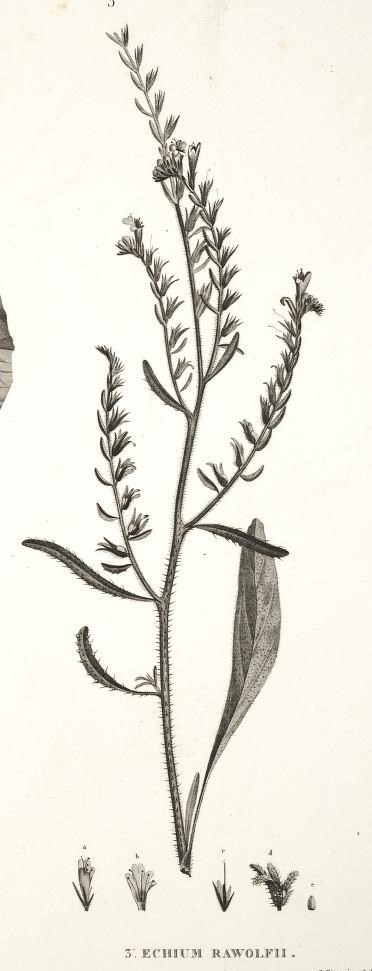
Pl.19 (Delile, 1813)

== Description ==
Echium rauwolfii is an annual. It is not a succulent. The leaves are alternate, and have smooth margins. It is found in steppes and deserts.

Delile's protologue (in French) describes it thus:

"The bark of the root is pink and thin; the stem is straight and branching, 6 decimeters high (2 feet): the radical leaves are ovate-lanceolate, 8 to 16 cm long (3 to 6 inches), narrowed in petiole; the lower branches emerge from the axils of oval-inverted leaves, i a little like a spoon; the upper leaves are linear-oblong, not narrowed in petiole: the stem and twigs are divided into long slender spikes, which successively bear more than thirty to forty flowers.

The calyx has five lanceolate divisions, of which the upper three are widest and biggest. The corolla is campanulate, white or pale pink, very slightly hairy, about 15 millimetres (0.6 in), slightly swollen, with five lobes, of which three smaller and two longer make its blade oblique, uneven.

The stamen filaments are thickened at their base, long like the corolla, brought together with style towards the side of the tube where the blade is more elongated. The style is threadlike, hairy in its lower half, thinned and bifid at the top.

The fruit has four ovoid seeds, triquetrous (triangular in cross-section and sharply angled), white or grey, smooth and shiny.

The whole plant is bristling with white, prickly hairs, which have a thickened base. The tubercles at the base of the hairs develop mainly on the leaves which accompany the fruiting branches, and on the calyces which enlarge with the fruit.

This Echium is very abundant on the dry sandy islands of the Nile, during the months of April and May."

== Etymology ==
The specific epithet, rauwolfii (originally rawolfii) honours Leonhard Rauwolf whom Delile credits with giving a very much earlier description contained in Johann Friedrich Gronovius's, Flora orientalis sive Recensio Plantarum quas Botanicorum Coryphaeus Leonhardus Rauwolffus… observavit, et collegit.(1755)
