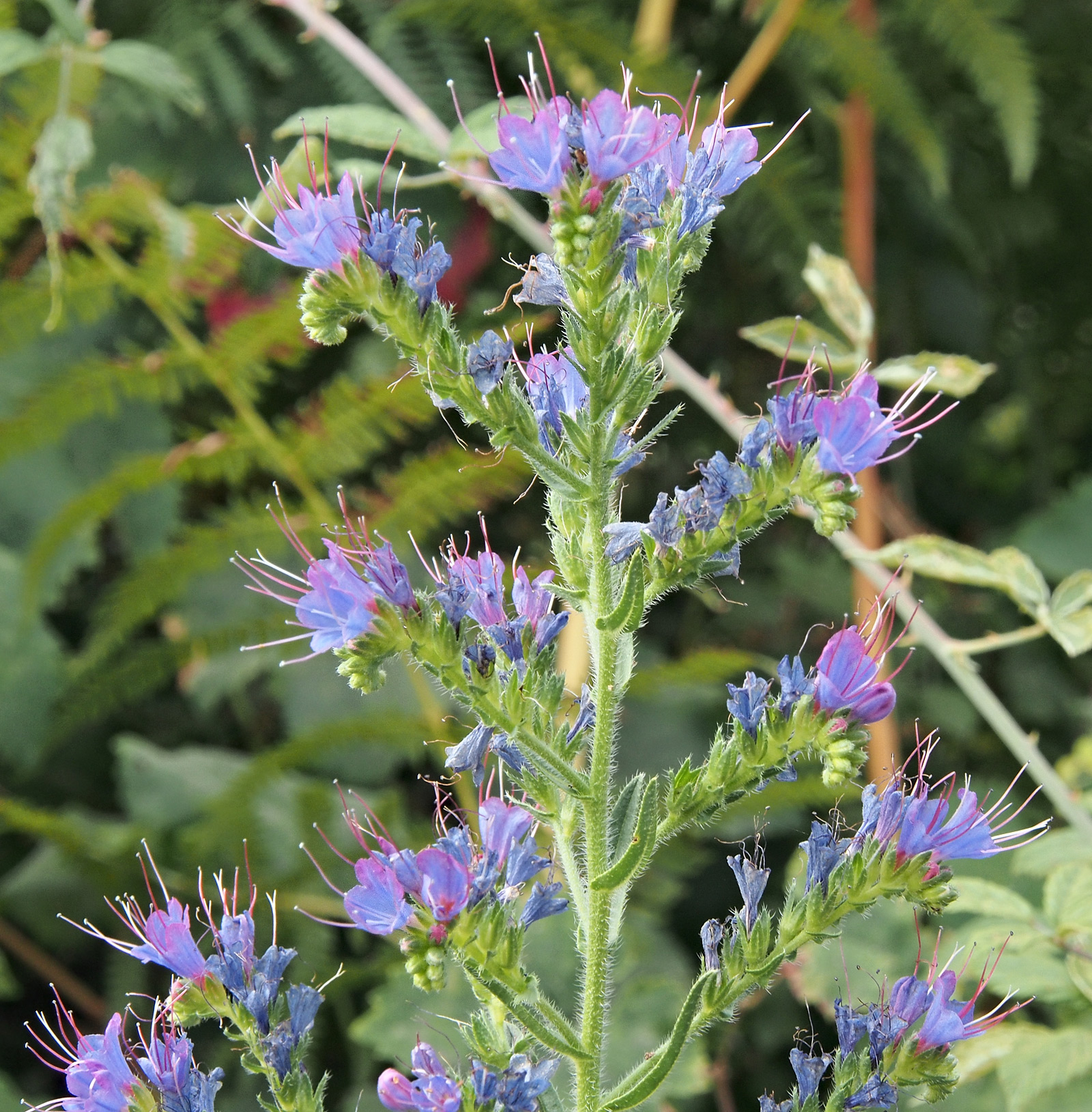

Scientific classification
- Kingdom: Plantae
- Clade: Tracheophytes
- Clade: Angiosperms
- Clade: Eudicots
- Clade: Asterids
- Order: Boraginales
- Family: Boraginaceae
- Genus: Echium
- Species: E. salmanticum

Binomial name
- Echium salmanticum Lag.

= Echium salmanticum =

Species of plant

Echium salmanticum is a species of plant belonging to the family Boraginaceae.

== Taxonomy ==
Echium salmanticum was described by Jean-Baptiste Lamarck and published in Tabl. Encycl. 1: 412 (1792)

=== Etymology ===
- Echium: generic name derived from the Greek echium, meaning viper, because of the triangular shape of the seeds which vaguely resemble the head of a viper.
- salmanticum: geographical epithet referring to its location in Salamanca.

== Description ==
Perennial herb with up to 50 stems, sericeous. Stems up to 80 (-100) cm, erect or ascending, usually simple, arising from the leaf axils of a basal rosette, with simple indumentum of long, patent setae. Leaves acute, with simple indumentum of more or less patent setae; those at the base up to 45 x 5 cm, narrowly elliptic, acute, gradually tapering into a short petiole, forming a well-marked rosette; caulinar leaves up to 11 x 2.5 cm, narrowly lanceolate, slightly auriculate or cuneate at the base. Inflorescence spiciform, rarely paniculate, lax, with numerous cymes; multi-flowered cymes, elongating up to 15 cm in the fruiting. Bracts of 3.5-7 x 0.6-2 mm, generally shorter than the calyx, linear-lanceolate, slightly auriculate at the base. Shortly pedicellate flowers. Calyx with lobes 3-6 x 1-1'5 (-2) mm, linear-lanceolate or lanceolate, slightly acrescent and ovate-lanceolate or narrowly ovate in fruiting, subobtuse, with simple short setae indumentum and generally some bi- or tricellular glandular hairs. Corolla of 6'5-9 (-10) mm, infundibuliform, subactinomorphic, abruptly widened at the insertion point of the stamens, with tube of 2-3'5 mm, well marked and blade of (5'5-) 6'5-8'5 (-10) mm in diameter, blue with whitish tube with short sparse hairs on almost the entire outer surface of the blade, sometimes absent. Androceo with the 5 stamens long exserted, with glabrous, reddish filaments. Nucules of 2-2.5 x 1.2-1.8 mm, slightly tuberculate-rugose, grey. 2n= 16.

== Distribution and habitat ==
Echium salmanticum is an endemic plant found mainly on the Castilian plateau of the dry clayey-calcareous-subnitrophilous meso-supramediterranean floor.

It is found in community with other typical types of plants. The combination of Echium salmanticum, Carduus granatensis and Verbascum pulverulentum frequently grows on land degraded by man, such as rubble heaps, around fields and in areas close to villages.

=== Cytology ===
Number of chromosomes of Echium salmanticum (Fam. Boraginaceae) and infraspecific taxa: n=8.

=== Synonymy ===
- Echium lusitanicum subsp. polycaulon (Boiss.) P.Gibbs
- Echium polycaulon Boiss.
