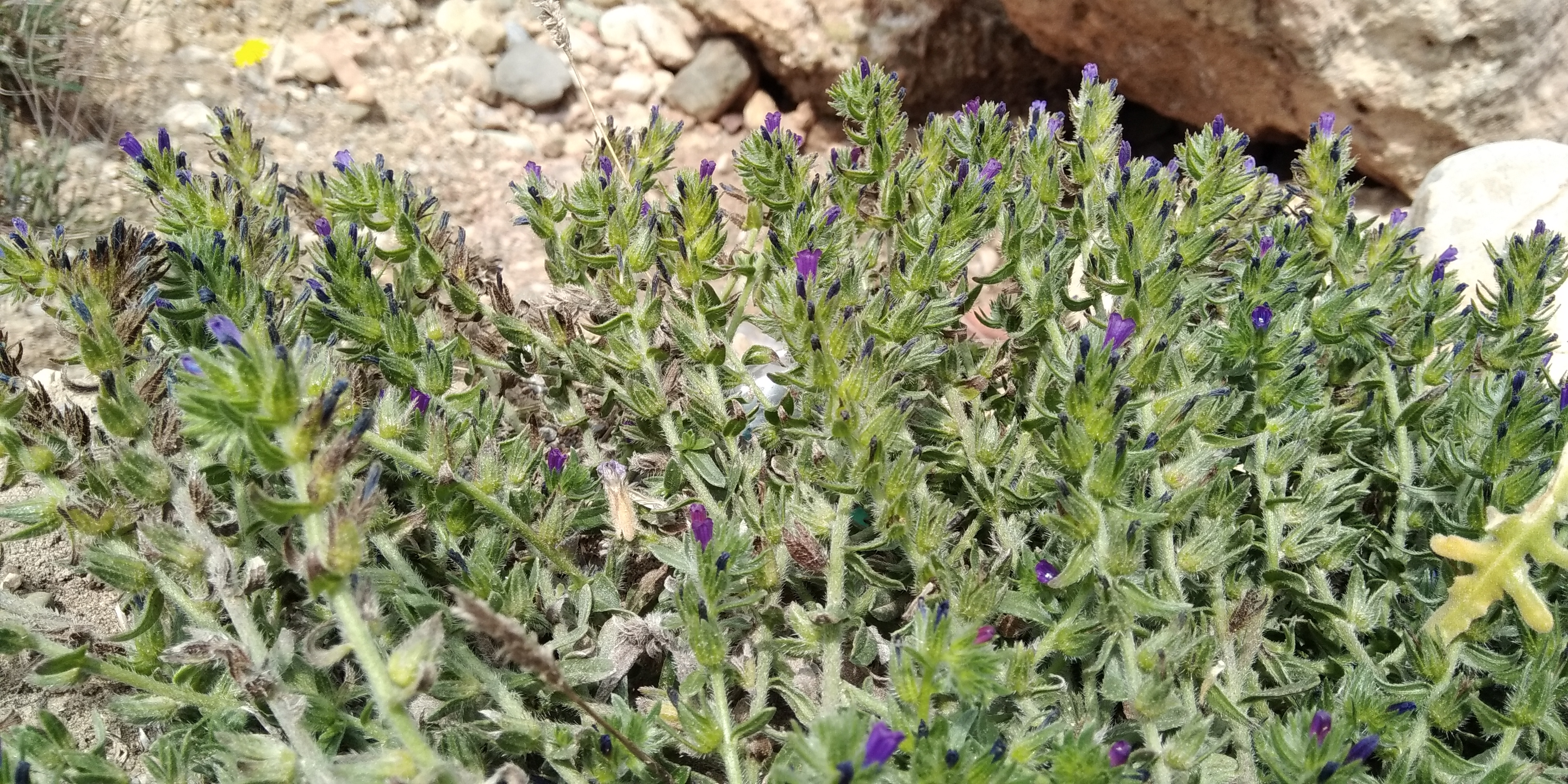

Scientific classification
- Kingdom: Plantae
- Clade: Tracheophytes
- Clade: Angiosperms
- Clade: Eudicots
- Clade: Asterids
- Order: Boraginales
- Family: Boraginaceae
- Genus: Echium
- Species: E. arenarium

Binomial name
- Echium arenarium Guss.

= Echium arenarium =

Species of plant

Echium arenarium is a species of plant in the family Boraginaceae. It is native to the Mediterranean coast.

== Sources ==
This article incorporates text from a free content work. Licensed under CC0 (license statement/permission). Text taken from Echium arenarium. Encyclopedia of Life.
