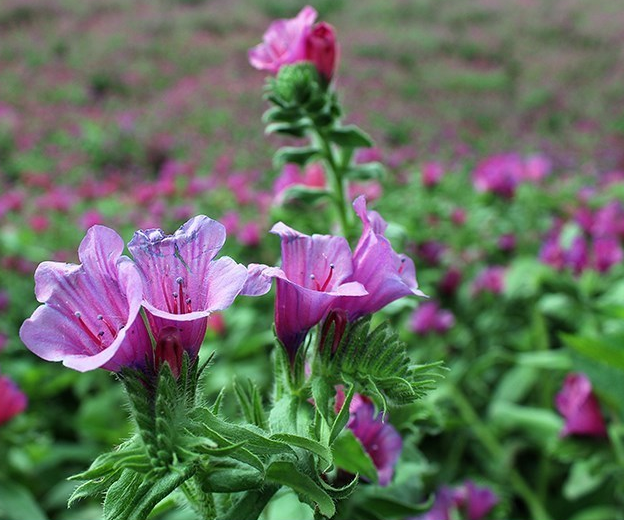

Scientific classification
- Kingdom: Plantae
- Clade: Embryophytes
- Clade: Tracheophytes
- Clade: Spermatophytes
- Clade: Angiosperms
- Clade: Eudicots
- Clade: Asterids
- Order: Boraginales
- Family: Boraginaceae
- Genus: Echium
- Species: E. amoenum

Binomial name
- Echium amoenum Fisch. & C.A.Mey. (1838)

Synonyms
- Echium orientale C.A.Mey. (1831)

= Echium amoenum =

Species of flowering plant

Echium amoenum (In Persian: گل گاوزبان) or Iranian Borage is one of the important medicinal herbs in Iranian traditional medicine. It is a biennial or perennial herb indigenous to the narrow zone of northern part of Iran, Caucasus, and southern Russia, where it grows at elevations ranging from 60 to 2,200 m (200 to 7,220 ft). E. amoenum has been advocated for a variety of effects such as demulcent, anti-inflammatory and analgesic, especially for the common cold, and as an anxiolytic and sedative.

== Description ==
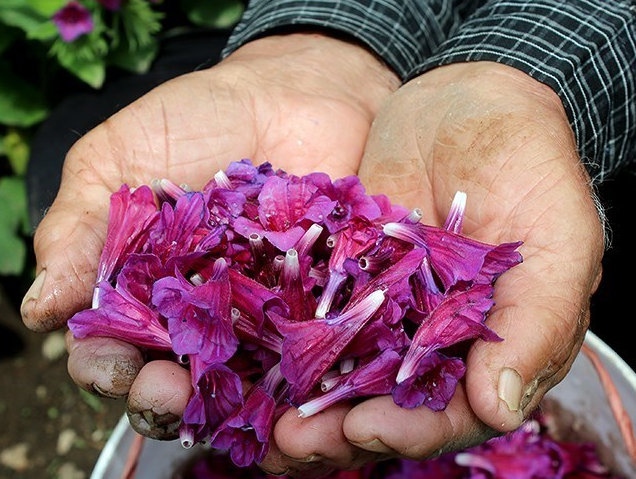
The flowers after the harvest in Gilan.

The herbaceous plant grows as a two- to perennial herb and reaches heights of around 50 cm. The flowers are about 3 cm long. It owes its Persian name گل گاوزبان (golgāvzabān, roughly “cow's tongue flower”) to its bristly, hairy stems and leaves, is an important medicinal plant in traditional Iranian medicine. The dried flowers are prepared as a tea, which is said to provide relief from some ailments.

== Effect ==
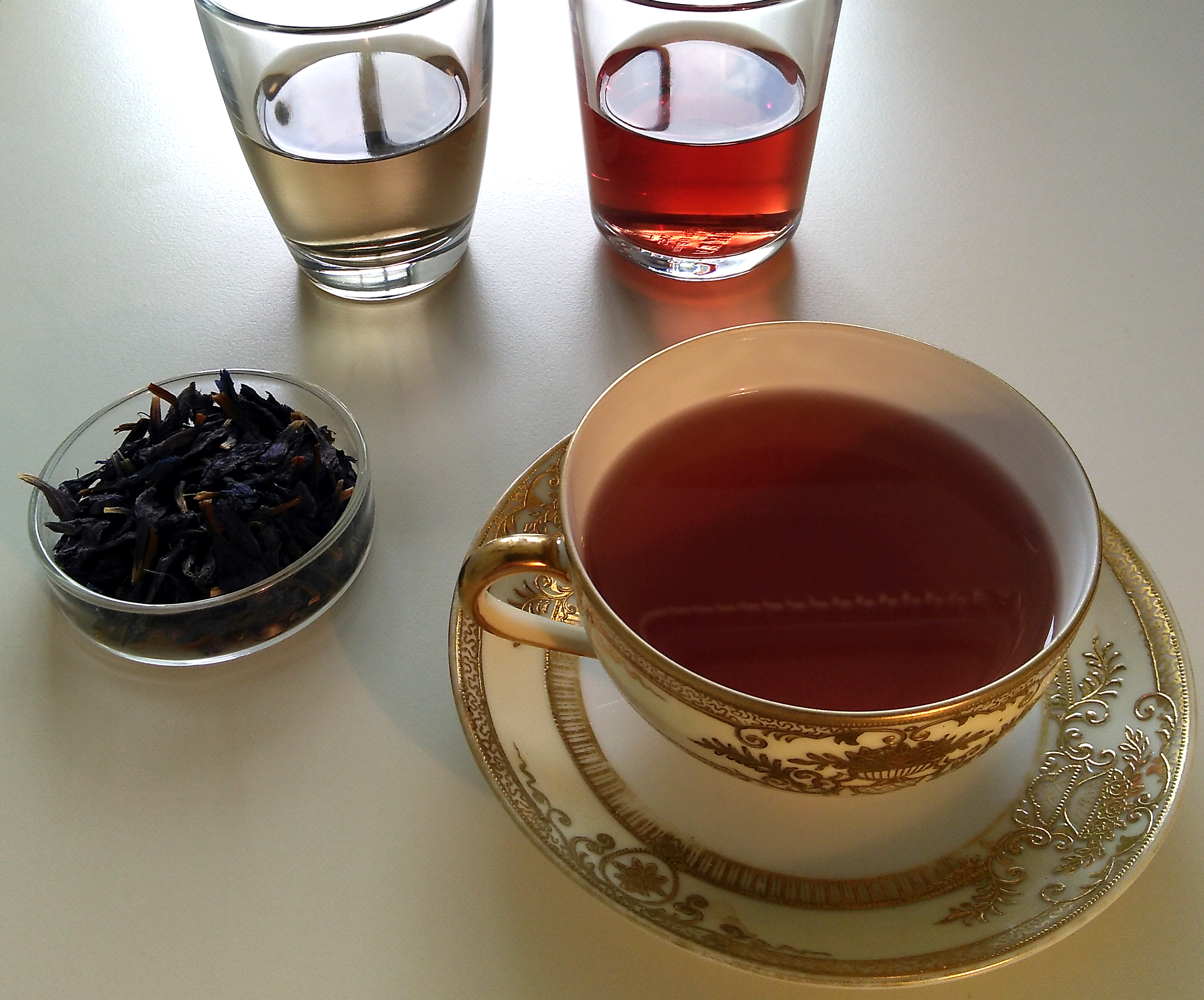
The tea made from dried flowers

The flower tea is claimed to have an anti-inflammatory and relaxing effect and is traditionally used, for example, for colds and sleep. In particular, it is used for its purported analgesic, sedating and anxiolytic properties. The mechanism of action has not yet been elucidated, but naloxone reduces the analgesic effect, which could indicate the involvement of opioid receptors. Other studies speculate about flavonoids as agents that may bind to benzodiazepine receptors.

== See also ==
- Medicinal herbs
- Iranian traditional medicine
