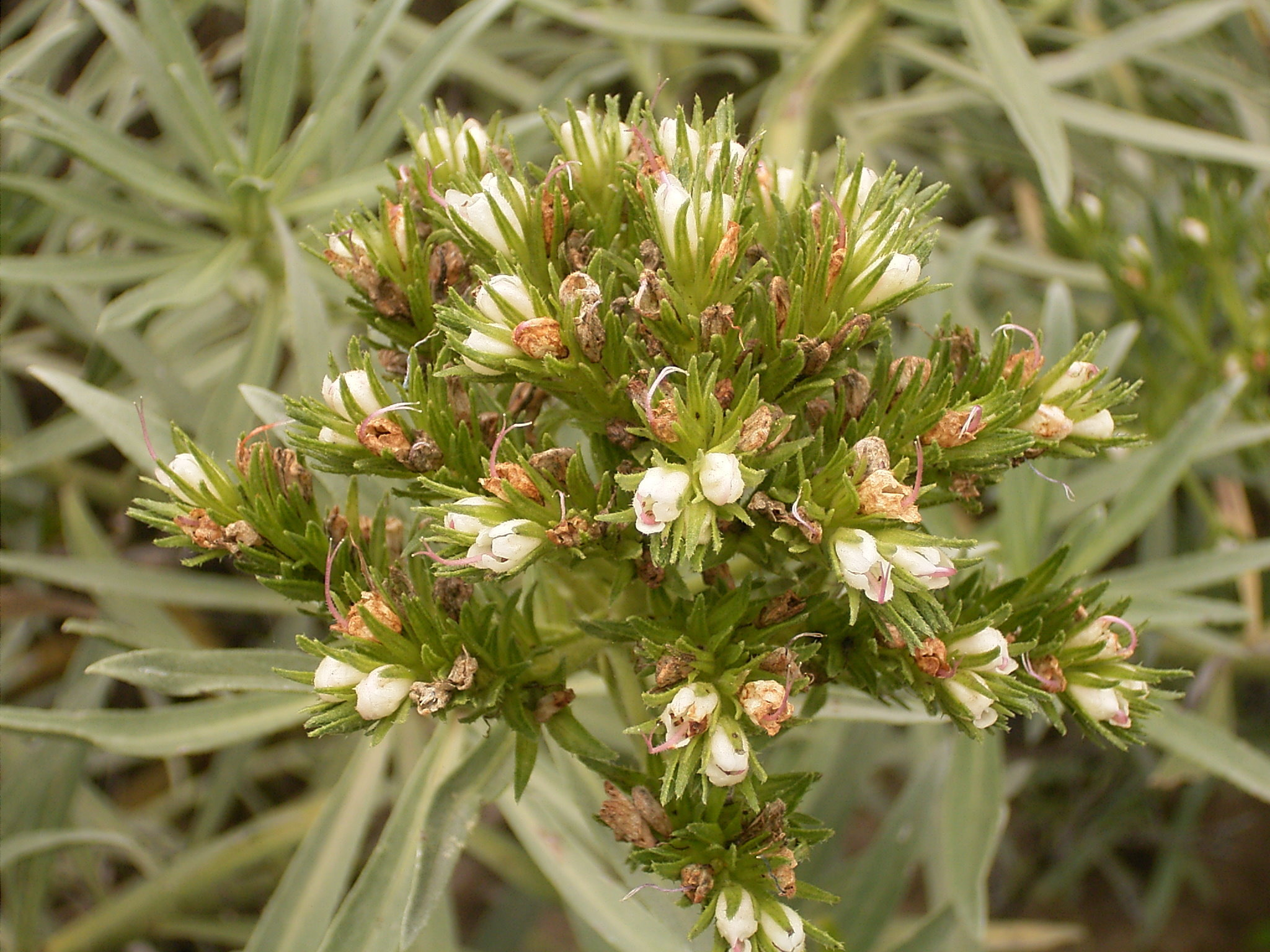
- Echium brevirame

Scientific classification
- Kingdom: Plantae
- Clade: Tracheophytes
- Clade: Angiosperms
- Clade: Eudicots
- Clade: Asterids
- Order: Boraginales
- Family: Boraginaceae
- Genus: Echium
- Species: E. brevirame

Binomial name
- Echium brevirame Sprague & Hutch.

Synonyms
- Echium aculeatum var. leucophaeum Bornm.; Echium giganteum f. inermis Coincy

= Echium brevirame =

Species of flowering plant

Echium brevirame is a species of flowering plant of the family Boraginaceae. It is endemic to the Canary Islands, where it is restricted to the island of La Palma.

It is a low woody shrub with, average height 30 centimetres (12 in), maximum height 100 centimetres (39 in). The leaves are leathery, spiny, and lance-shaped. Its flowers are white and sit in a compact inflorescence.
