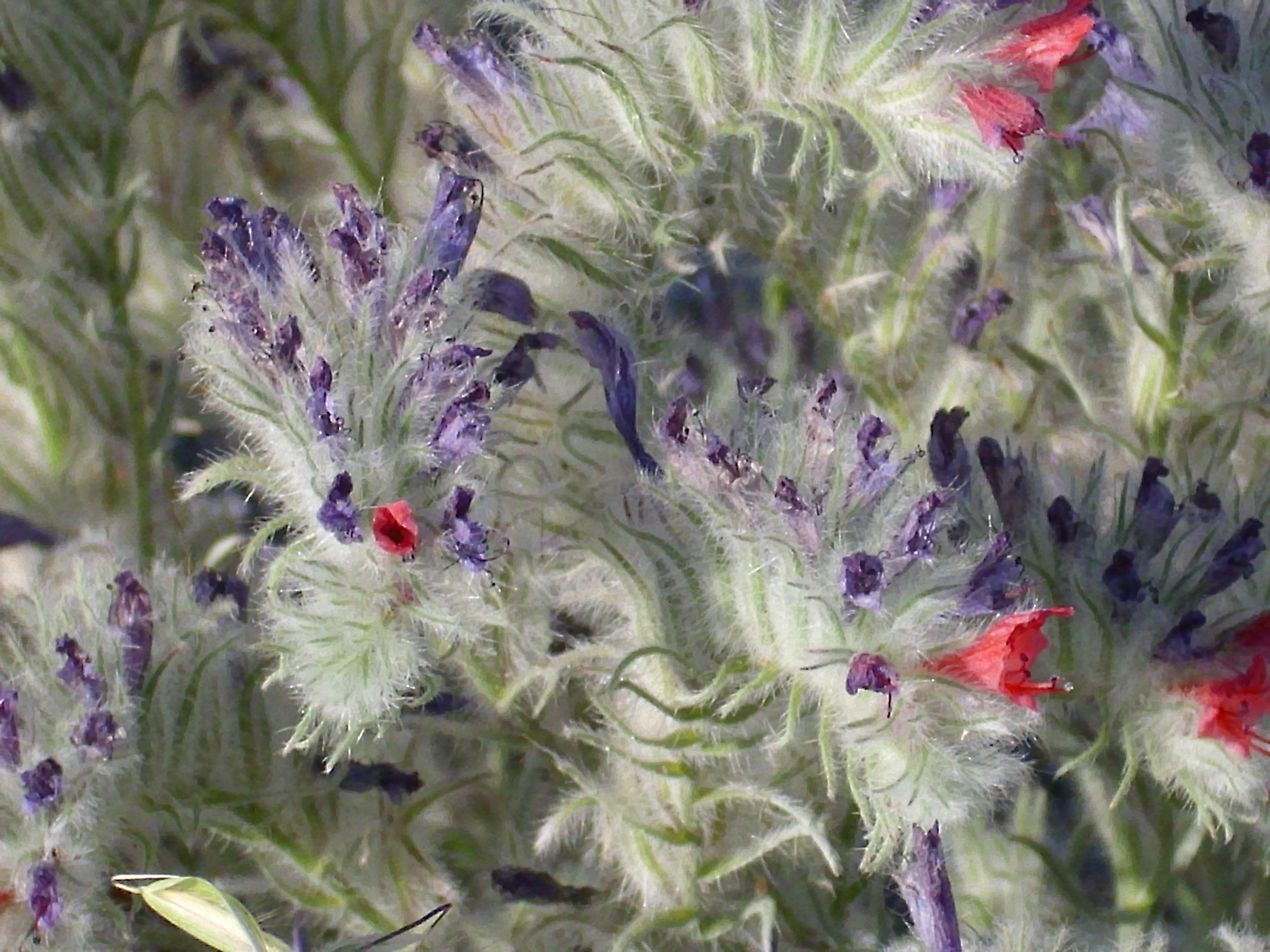

Scientific classification
- Kingdom: Plantae
- Clade: Tracheophytes
- Clade: Angiosperms
- Clade: Eudicots
- Clade: Asterids
- Order: Boraginales
- Family: Boraginaceae
- Genus: Echium
- Species: E. albicans

Binomial name
- Echium albicans Lag. & Rodr.

= Echium albicans =

White-leaved bugloss

Species of flowering plant

Echium albicans, commonly known as white-leaved bugloss, is a species of purple coloured perennial plants from family Boraginaceae, found in Andalucían mountains and in Marbella.
