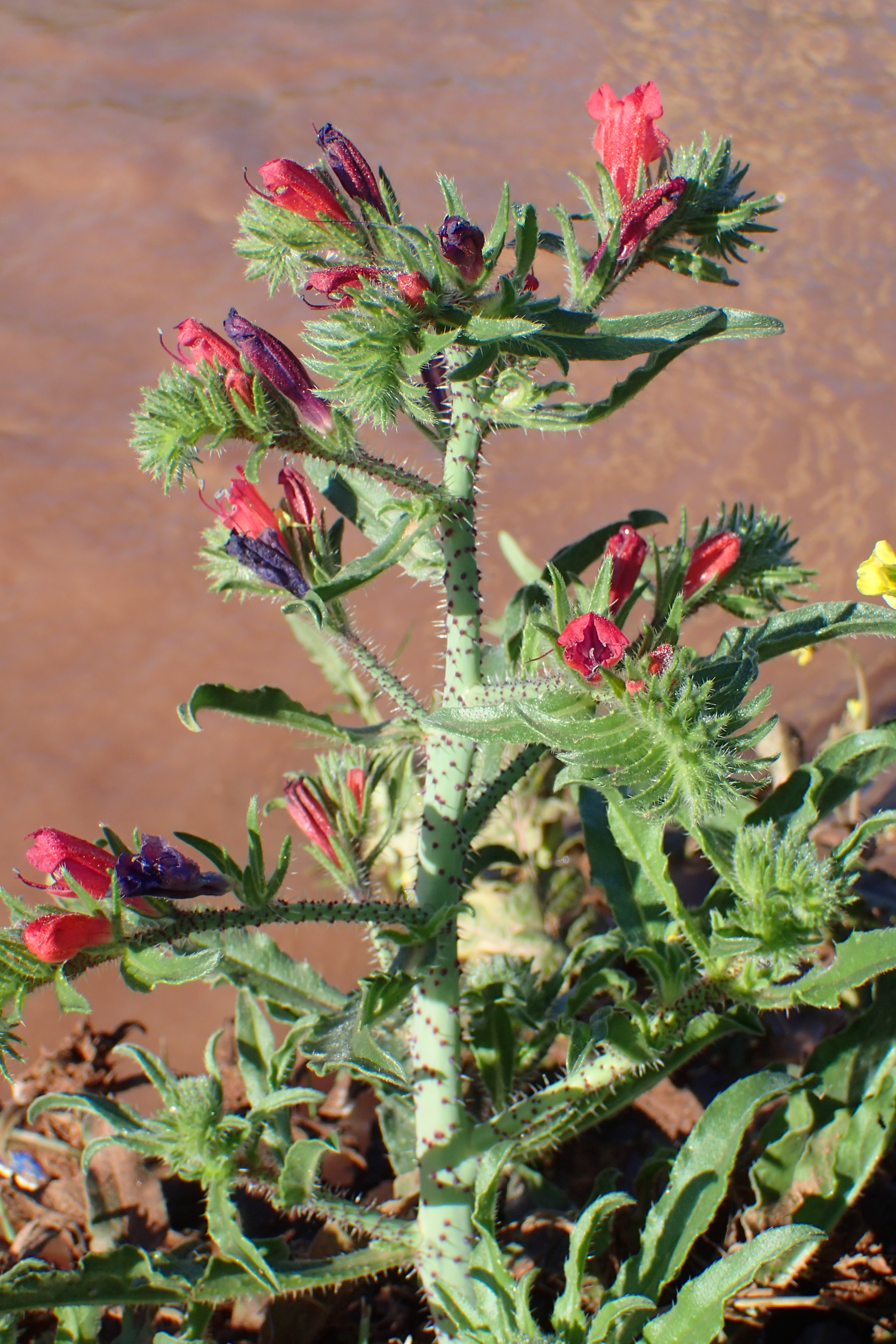

Scientific classification
- Kingdom: Plantae
- Clade: Tracheophytes
- Clade: Angiosperms
- Clade: Eudicots
- Clade: Asterids
- Order: Boraginales
- Family: Boraginaceae
- Genus: Echium
- Species: E. horridum

Binomial name
- Echium horridum Hoffm. & Link

= Echium horridum =

Species of flowering plant

Echium horridum is a species of flowering plant native to North Africa, including the Sahara desert and the Sahel region.
