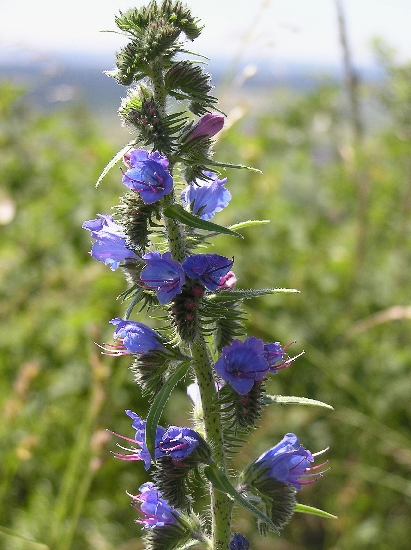
- Echium vulgare

Scientific classification
- Kingdom: Plantae
- Clade: Embryophytes
- Clade: Tracheophytes
- Clade: Spermatophytes
- Clade: Angiosperms
- Clade: Eudicots
- Clade: Asterids
- Order: Boraginales
- Family: Boraginaceae
- Subfamily: Boraginoideae
- Genus: Echium; L. (1753)

Type species
- Echium vulgare

Species
- 68; see text

Synonyms
- Argyrexias Raf. (1838); Echion St.-Lag. (1880), orth. var.; Isoplesion Raf. (1838); Larephes Raf. (1838)

= Echium =

Genus of flowering plants in the borage family

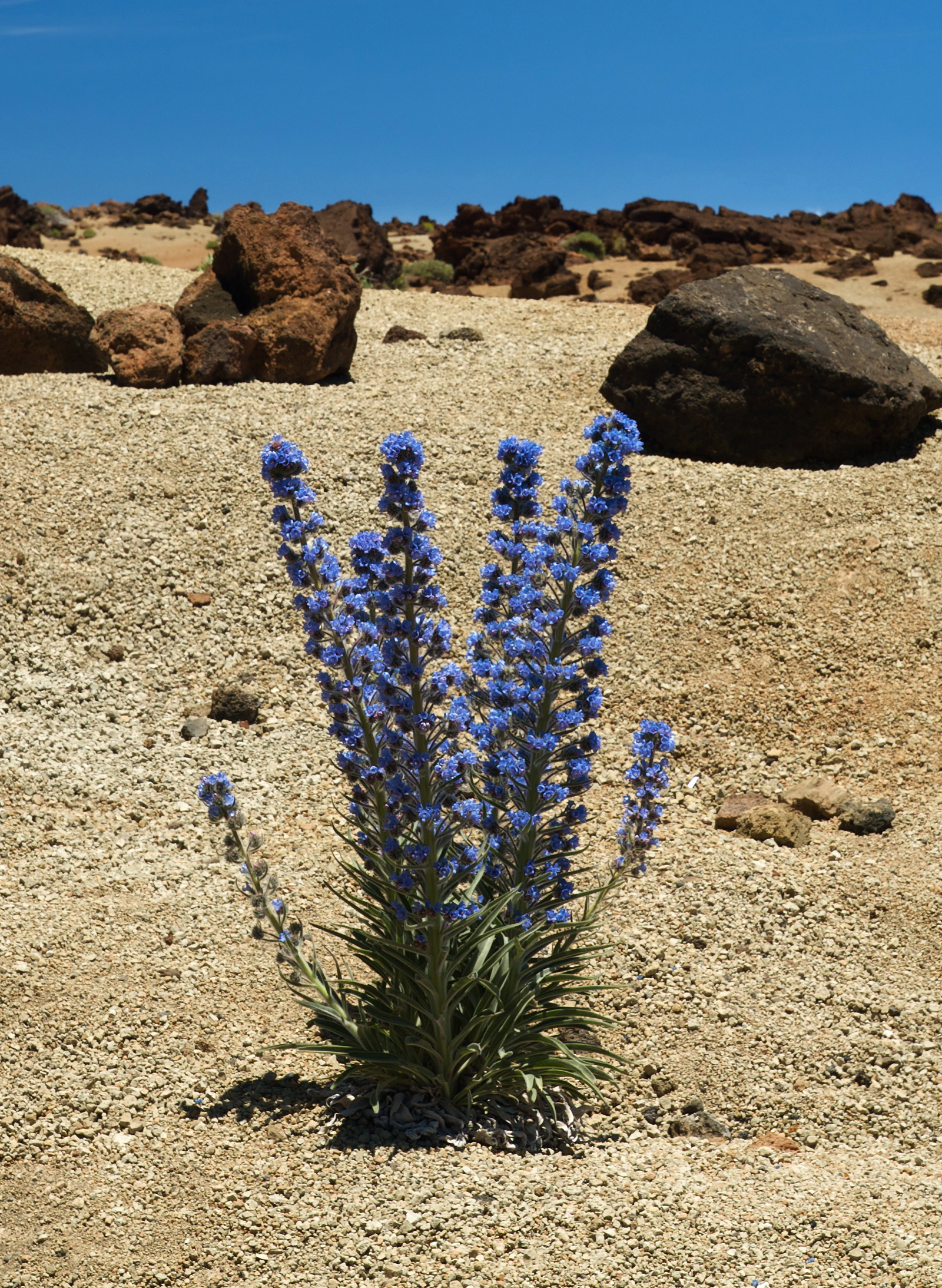
Echium auberianum

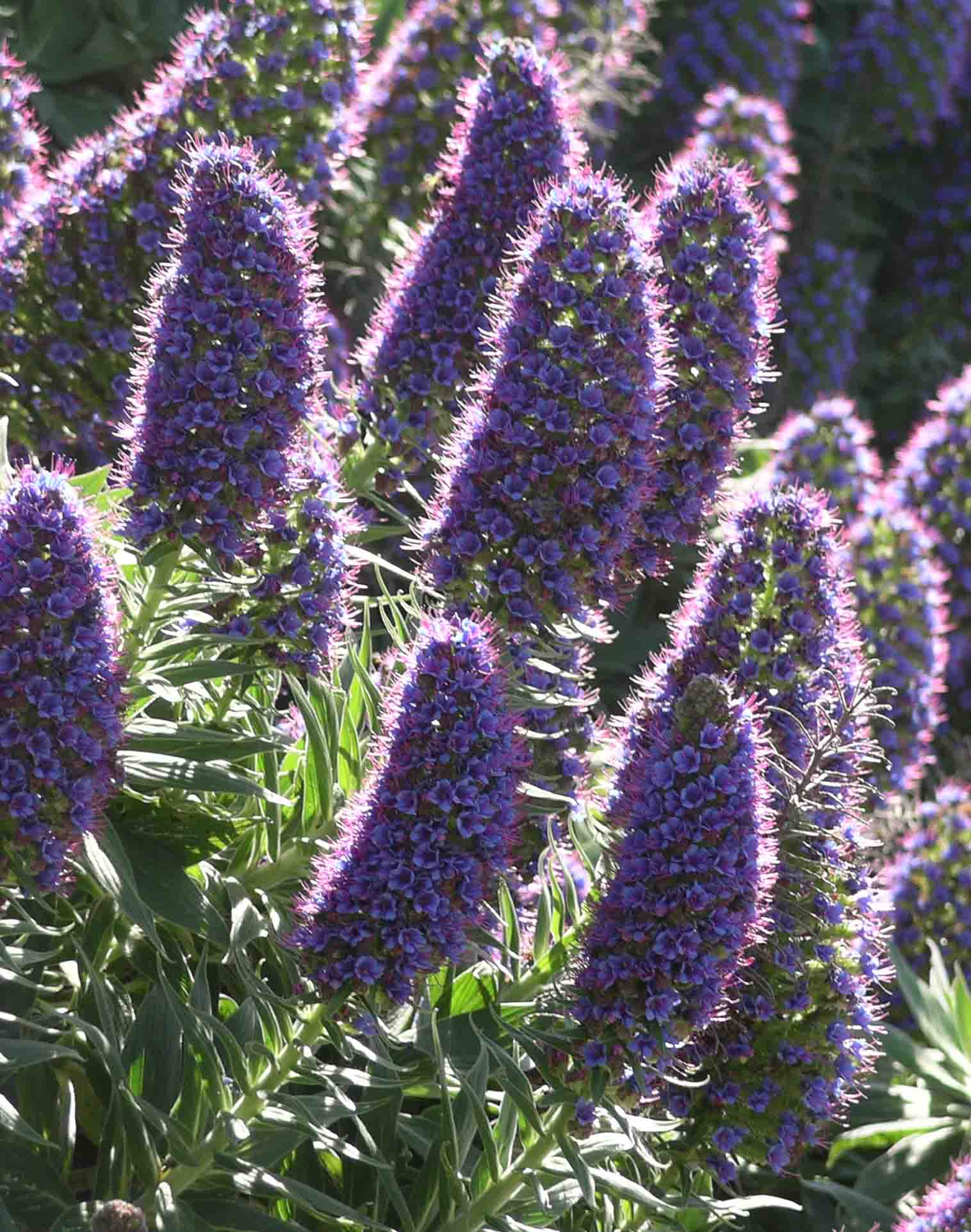
Echium candicans ('Pride of Madeira')

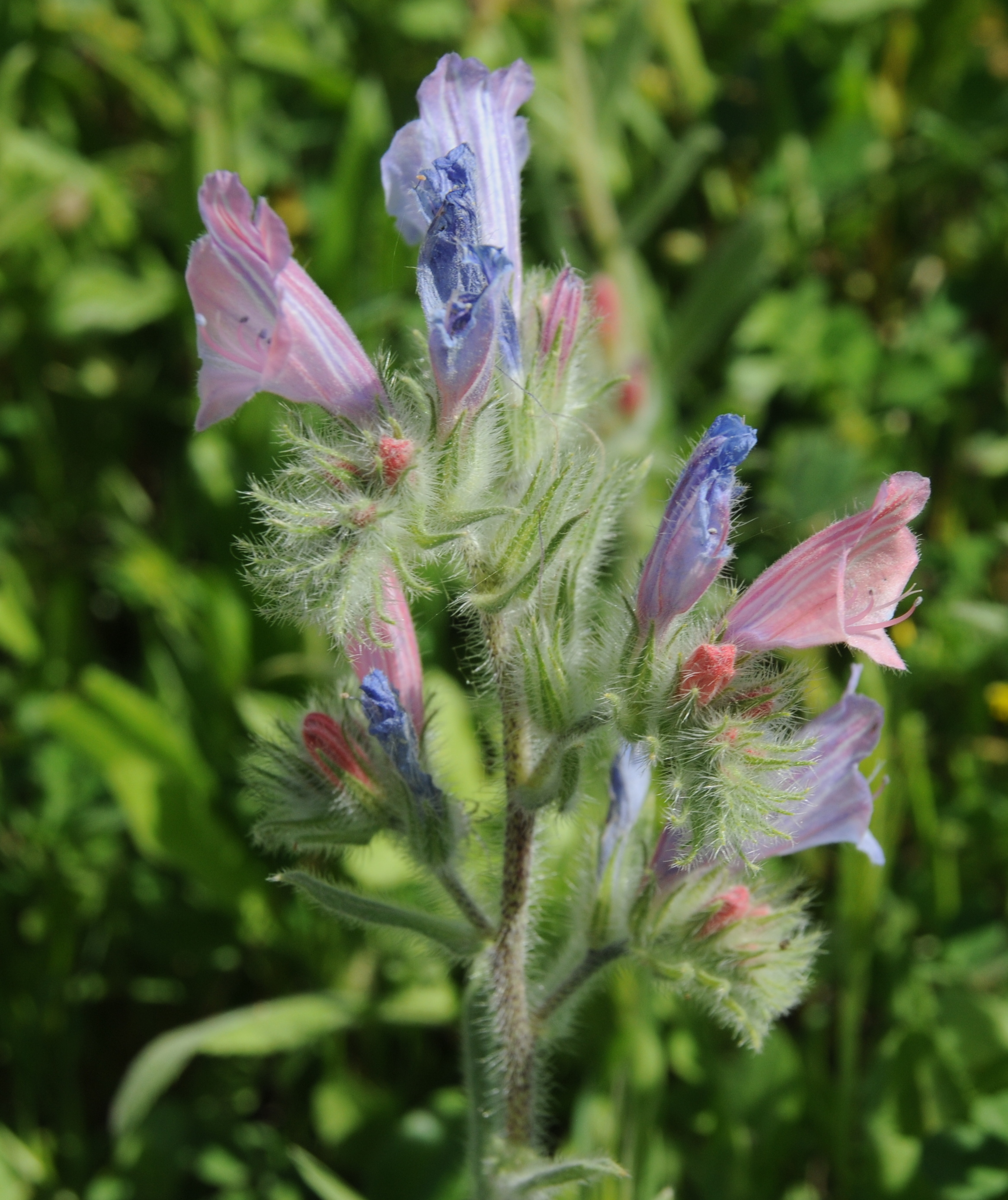
Echium judaeum

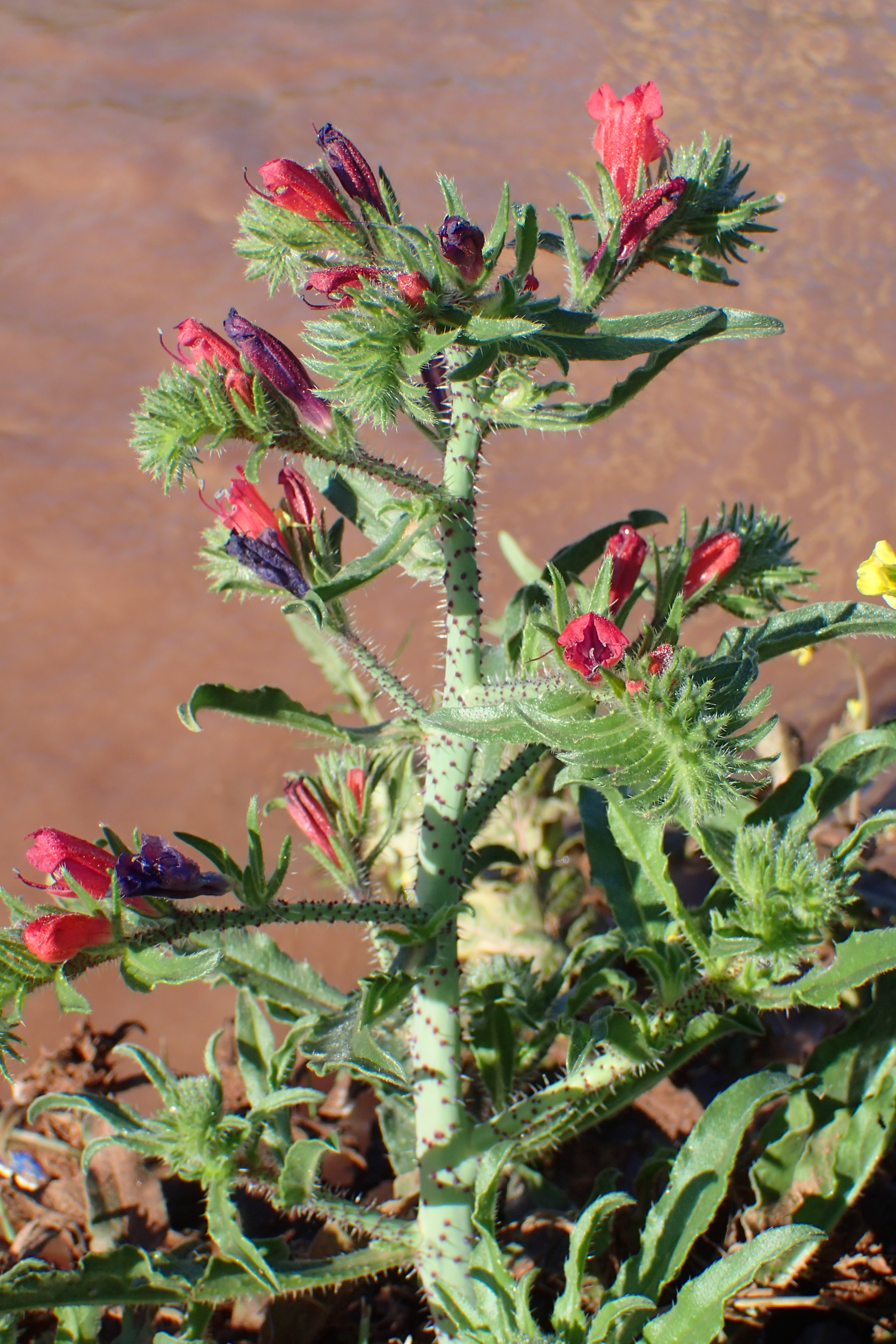
Echium horridum

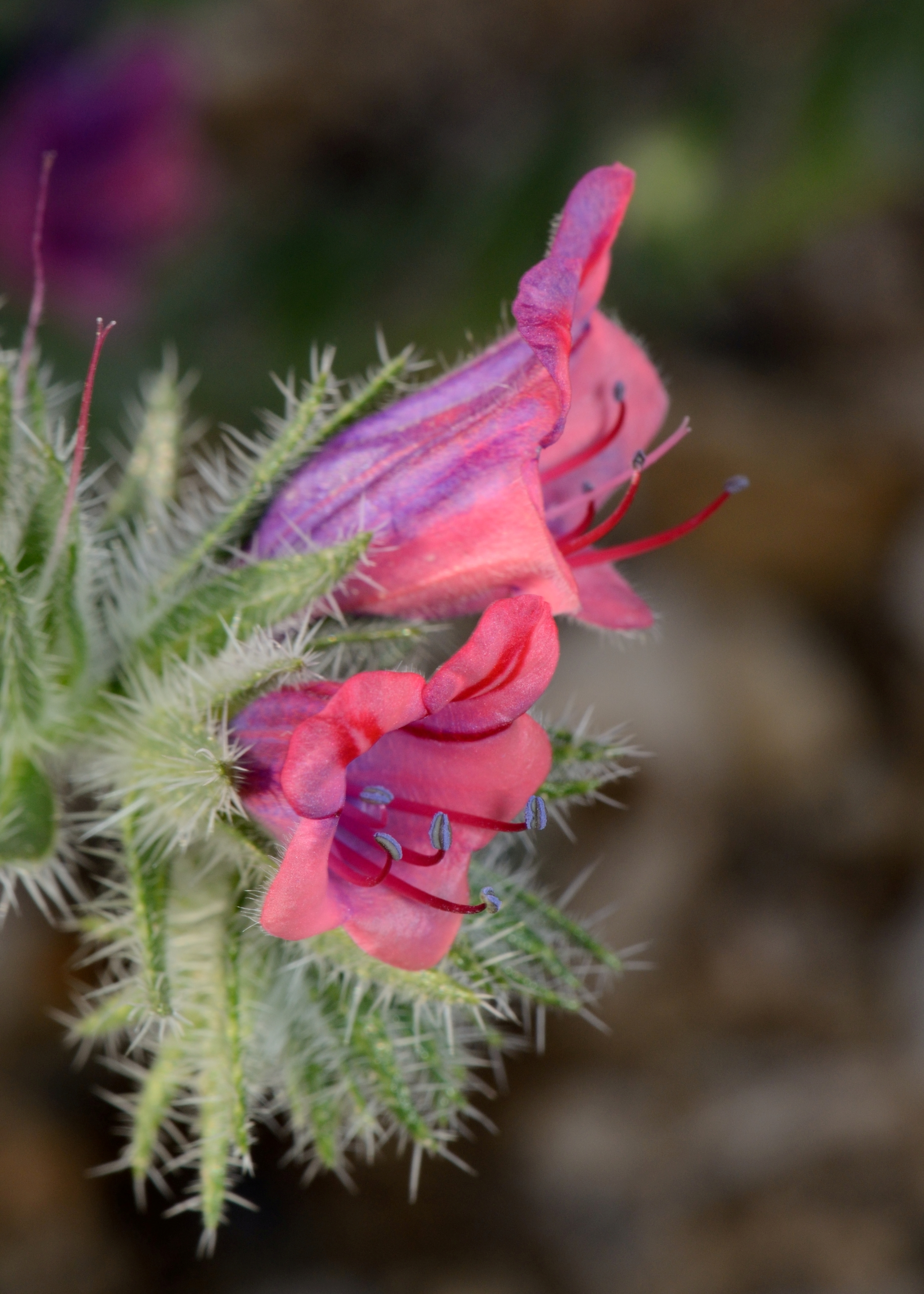
Echium rauwolfii

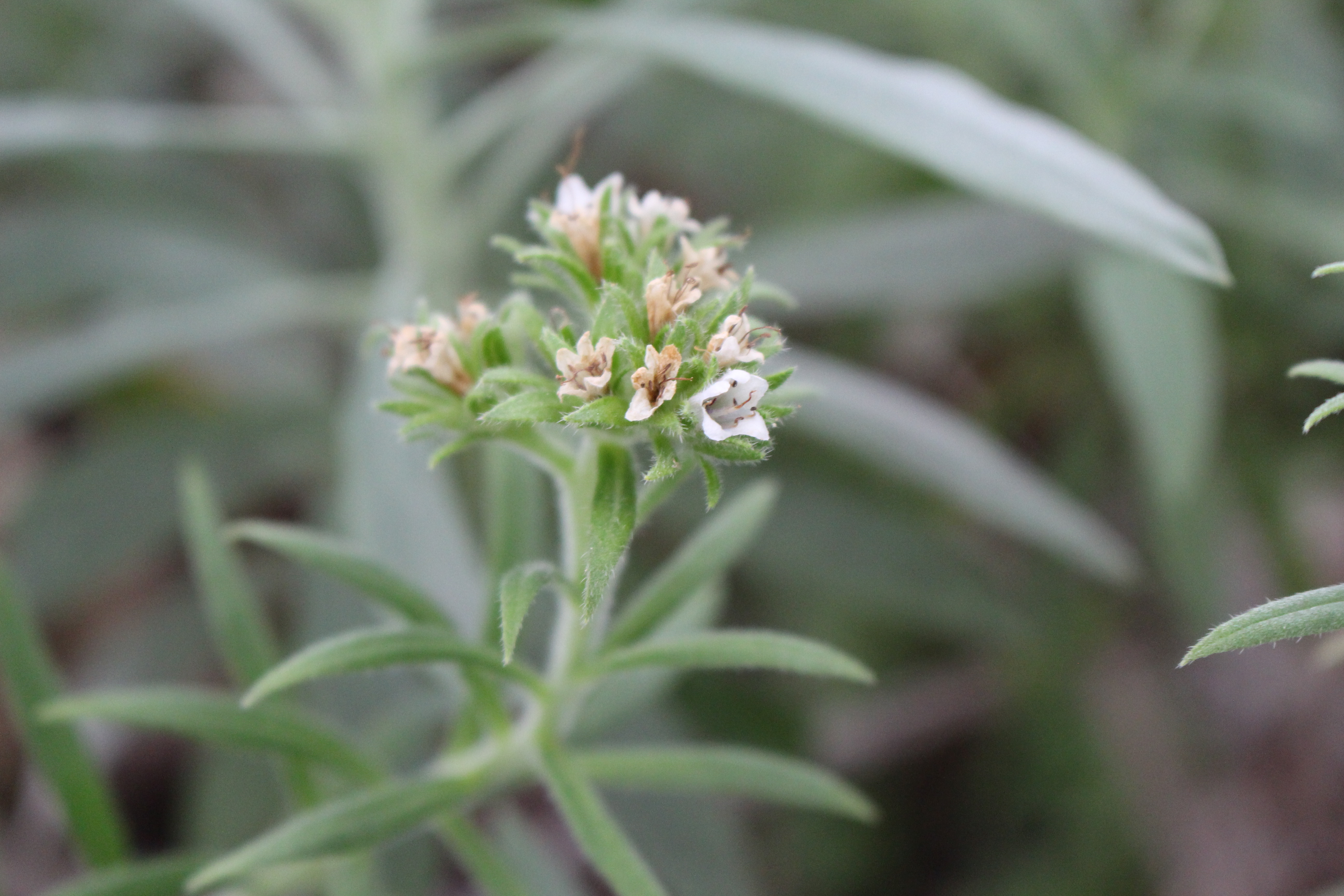
Flowers of Echium hierrense, a species native to El Hierro Echium angustifolium in Cyprus

Echium /ˈɛkiəm/ is a genus of flowering plants in the family Boraginaceae that contains about 70 species and several subspecies.

Species of Echium are native to North Africa, mainland Europe to Central Asia, and the Macaronesian islands where the genus reaches its maximum diversity. Twenty-nine species of Echium are endemic to the Canary, Madeira, and Cape Verde archipelagos. The continental species are herbaceous, whereas many of the endemic species of the Macaronesian islands are woody perennial shrubs.

== Etymology ==
The Latin genus name Echium comes from the Greek ἔχιον echion, referring to Echium plantagineum and itself deriving from ἔχις echis (viper); the Greek term dates to Dioscorides, who noted a resemblance between the shape of the nutlets and a viper's head. The genus Echium was published by Carl Linnaeus in 1753.

== Cultivation and uses ==
Many species are used as ornamental and garden plants and may be found in suitable climates throughout the world. In Crete, Echium italicum is called pateroi (πάτεροι) or voidoglosses (βοϊδόγλωσσες) and its tender shoots are eaten boiled or steamed.

Echium species are used as food plants by the larvae of some Lepidoptera species including Coleophora onosmella and orange swift.

In some countries Echium extract has been used as cure for various diseases and is believed to have beneficial properties.

=== Echium seed oil ===
The seed oil from E. plantagineum contains high levels of alpha-linolenic acid (ALA), gamma-linolenic acid, and stearidonic acid, making it valuable in cosmetic and skin-care applications, with further potential as a functional food, as an alternative to fish oils. However, despite its high ALA content, Echium seed oil does not increase docosahexaenoic acid and eicosapentaenoic acid levels.

== Invasiveness ==
Some species have been widely naturalized in Mediterranean climates, including South Africa, Australia, New Zealand, and parts of South America and the United States. For example, Echium plantagineum has become a major invasive species in Australia.

== Species ==
68 species are accepted.

- Echium acanthocarpum Svent.
- Echium aculeatum Poir.
- Echium albicans Lag. & Rodr.
- Echium amoenum Fisch. & C.A.Mey
- Echium anchusoides Bacch., Brullo & Selvi
- Echium angustifolium Lam.
- Echium arenarium Guss.
- Echium asperrimum Lam.
- Echium auberianum Webb & Berthel.
- Echium × bailaderense A.A.Weller
- Echium bethencourtii A.Santos
- Echium boissieri Steud.
- Echium × bond-spraguei Sprague & Hutch.
- Echium bonnetii Coincy
- Echium brevirame Sprague & Hutch.
- Echium callithyrsum Webb ex Bolle
- Echium candicans L.f.
- Echium canum Emb. & Maire
- Echium clandestinum Pomel
- Echium creticum L.
- Echium decaisnei Webb & Berthel.
- Echium flavum Desf.
- Echium gaditanum Boiss.
- Echium giganteum L.f.
- Echium glomeratum Poir.
- Echium handiense Svent.
- Echium hierrense Webb ex Bolle
- Echium horridum Batt.
- Echium humile Desf.
- Echium hypertropicum Webb
- Echium italicum L.
- Echium judaeum Lacaita
- Echium khuzistanicum Mozaff.
- Echium × lemsii G.Kunkel
- Echium leucophaeum (Webb ex Christ) Webb ex Sprague & Hutch.
- Echium × lidii G.Kunkel
- Echium longifolium Delile
- Echium lusitanicum L.
- Echium modestum Ball
- Echium montenielluense Delage
- Echium nervosum W.T.Aiton
- Echium onosmifolium Webb & Berthel.
- Echium pabotii Mouterde
- Echium parviflorum Moench
- Echium perezii Sprague
- Echium petiolatum Barratte & Coincy
- Echium pininana Webb et Berthel.
- Echium pitardii A.Chev.
- Echium plantagineum L.
- Echium portosanctense J.A.Carvalho, Pontes, Bat.-Marques & R.Jardim
- Echium rauwolfii Delile
- Echium rosulatum Lange
- Echium rubrum Forssk.
- Echium sabulicola Pomel
- Echium salmanticum Lag.
- Echium simplex DC.
- Echium spurium Lojac.
- Echium stenosiphon Webb
- Echium strictum L.f.
- Echium suffruticosum Barratte
- Echium sventenii Bramwell
- Echium x taibiquense P.Wolff & Rosinski
- Echium tenue Roth
- Echium thyrsiflorum Masson ex Link
- Echium triste Svent.
- Echium trygorrhizum Pomel
- Echium tuberculatum Hoffmanns. & Link
- Echium velutinum Coincy
- Echium virescens DC.
- Echium vulcanorum A.Chev.
- Echium vulgare L.
- Echium webbii Coincy
- Echium wildpretii H.Pearson ex Hook.f.

=== Formerly placed here ===
- Megacaryon orientale (L.) Boiss. (as Echium orientale L.)
- Pontechium maculatum (L.) Böhle & Hilger (as Echium maculatum L.)
