= Auguste-Henri de Coincy =

French botanist

Auguste-Henri Cornut de la Fontaine de Coincy (1837, Lille – 30 January 1903) was a French botanist.

A native of Lille, he received his education at the lycée in Sens. Known for his investigations of flora native to Spain, he was the author of "Ecloga plantarum hispanicarum", a five-part series on Spanish flora published from 1893 to 1901. He was also the author of several papers involving the botanical genus Echium.

As a taxonomist, he described the genus Rouya (family Apiaceae). The genus Coincya (family Brassicaceae) commemorates his name. The "Prix de Coincy" is an award issued by the Société botanique de France for excellence in taxonomic research.
