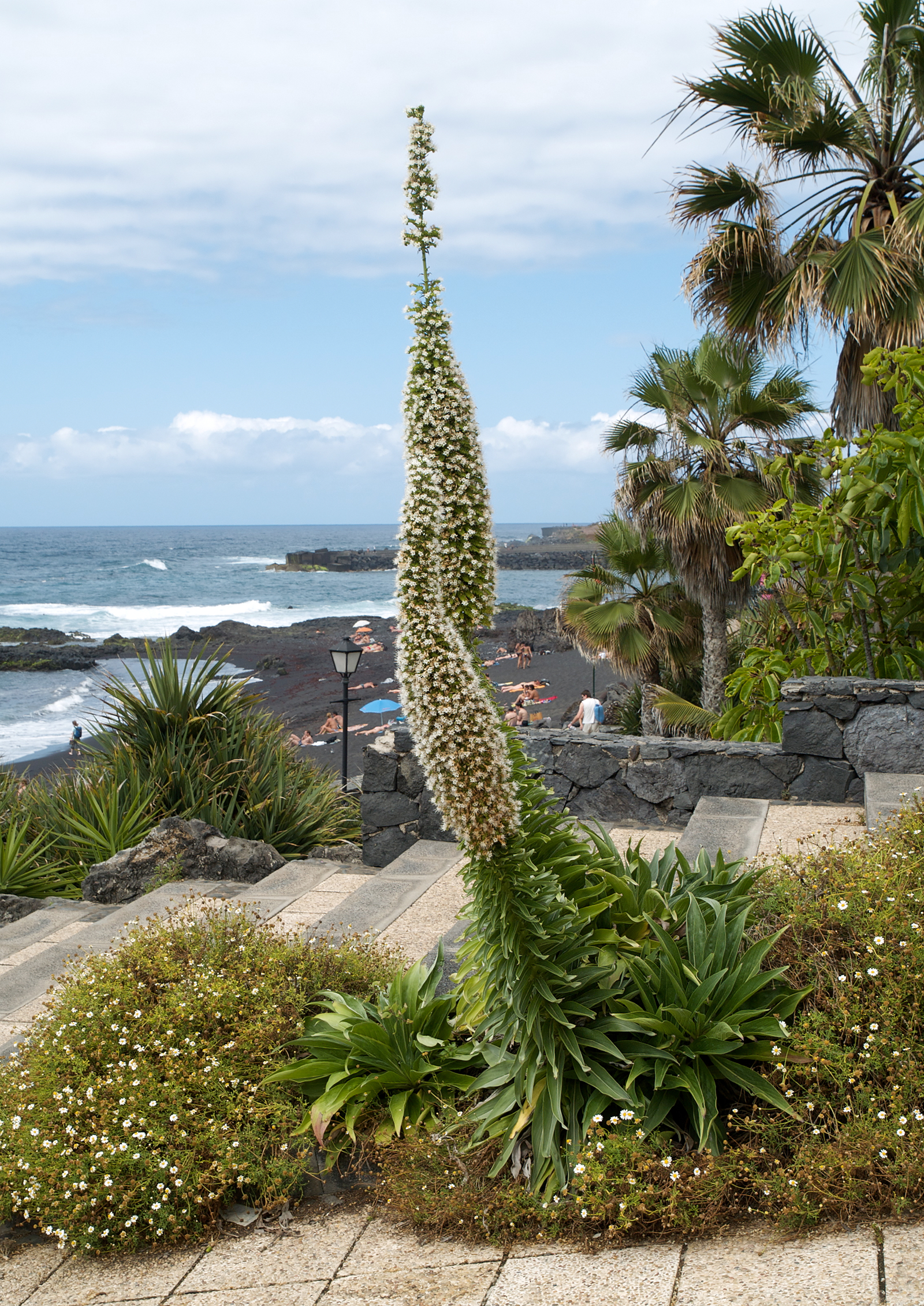

Scientific classification
- Kingdom: Plantae
- Clade: Tracheophytes
- Clade: Angiosperms
- Clade: Eudicots
- Clade: Asterids
- Order: Boraginales
- Family: Boraginaceae
- Genus: Echium
- Species: E. simplex

Binomial name
- Echium simplex DC.

Synonyms
- Echium creticum Sims

= Echium simplex =

Tower of jewels

Species of flowering plant

Echium simplex, commonly known as pride of Tenerife or tower of jewels, is an herbaceous biennial plant which grows up to 3 m (9.8 ft) in height.

== Habitat ==
It is a frost intolerant species requiring sustained periods of sunlight to thrive. It is endemic in the island of Tenerife mainly in Macizo de Anaga.

== Description ==
The plant is biennial producing a dense rosette in the first year and producing the distinctive inflorescence to a height of 1–3 metres (3 ft 3 in – 9 ft 10 in) during the second year. The flowers are white and the plant is in bloom from February to April in Tenerife. E. simplex is widely available as a garden flower in warm temperate areas. It is very attractive to bees and produces a distinctively flavored honey.
