= Stenidea schurmanni =

Scientific classification
- Domain: Eukaryota
- Kingdom: Animalia
- Phylum: Arthropoda
- Class: Insecta
- Order: Coleoptera
- Suborder: Polyphaga
- Infraorder: Cucujiformia
- Family: Cerambycidae
- Genus: Stenidea
- Species: S. schurmanni

Binomial name
- Stenidea schurmanni (Sama, 1996)

Synonyms
- Deroplia schurmanni Sama, 1996

Species of beetle

Stenidea schurmanni is a species of beetle in the family Cerambycidae. It was described by Sama in 1996, originally under the genus Deroplia. It is known from the Canary Islands. It feeds on Euphorbia balsamifera and Euphorbia regis-jubae.
