= Stenidea gertiana =

Scientific classification
- Domain: Eukaryota
- Kingdom: Animalia
- Phylum: Arthropoda
- Class: Insecta
- Order: Coleoptera
- Suborder: Polyphaga
- Infraorder: Cucujiformia
- Family: Cerambycidae
- Genus: Stenidea
- Species: S. gertiana

Binomial name
- Stenidea gertiana (Sama, 1996)

Synonyms
- Deroplia gertiana Sama, 1996; Stenidea hesperus (Wollaston) Demelt, 1974 (partim.)

Species of beetle

Stenidea gertiana is a species of beetle in the family Cerambycidae. It was described by Sama in 1996, originally under the genus Deroplia. It is known from the Canary Islands. It feeds on Euphorbia balsamifera.
