= Stenidea nemorensis =

Scientific classification
- Domain: Eukaryota
- Kingdom: Animalia
- Phylum: Arthropoda
- Class: Insecta
- Order: Coleoptera
- Suborder: Polyphaga
- Infraorder: Cucujiformia
- Family: Cerambycidae
- Genus: Stenidea
- Species: S. nemorensis

Binomial name
- Stenidea nemorensis (Thomson, 1860)

Synonyms
- Amblesthis nemorensis Thomson, 1860

Species of beetle

Stenidea nemorensis is a species of beetle in the family Cerambycidae. It was described by Thomson in 1860, originally under the genus Amblesthis.
