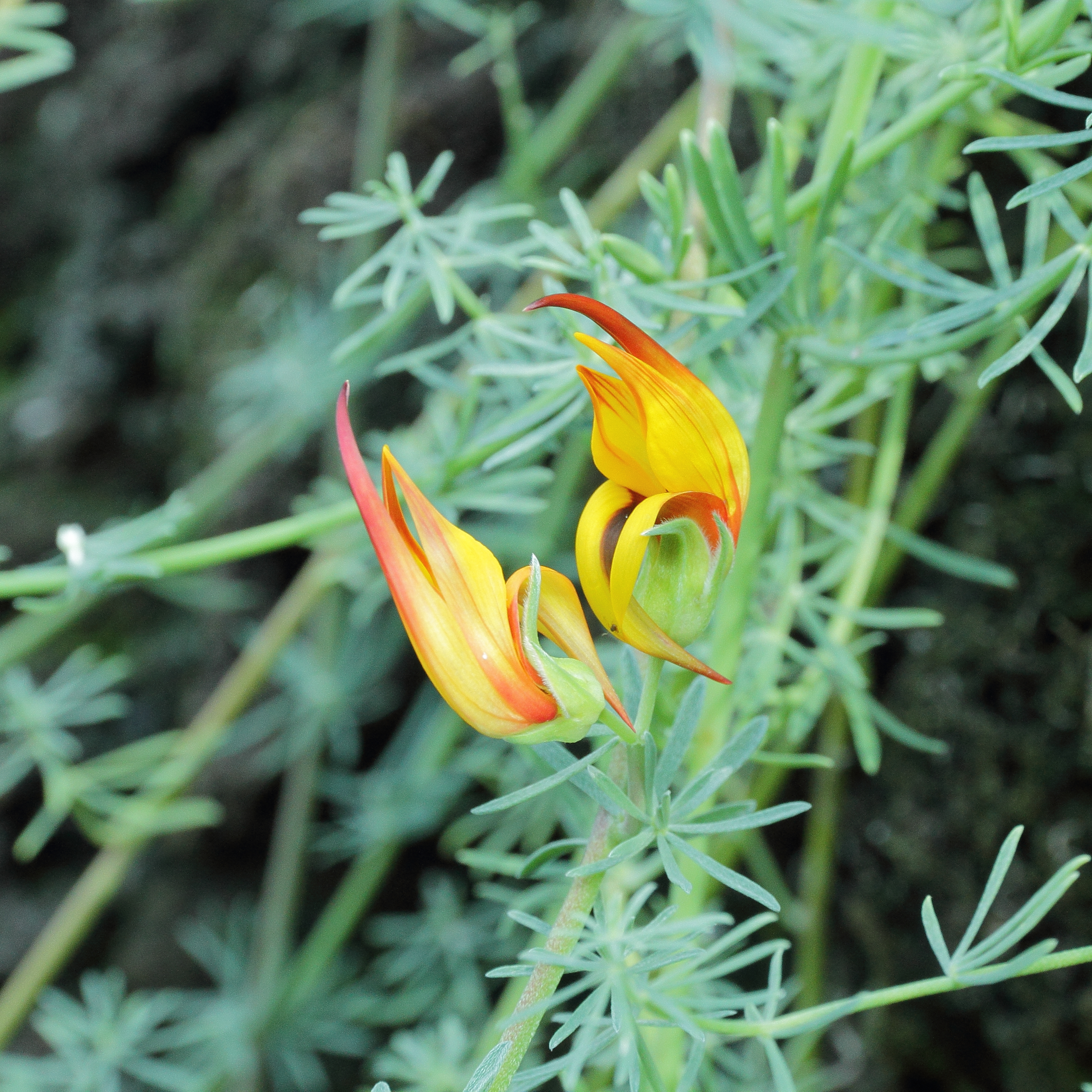

Conservation status
- Critically Endangered (IUCN 3.1)

Scientific classification
- Kingdom: Plantae
- Clade: Tracheophytes
- Clade: Angiosperms
- Clade: Eudicots
- Clade: Rosids
- Order: Fabales
- Family: Fabaceae
- Subfamily: Faboideae
- Genus: Lotus
- Species: L. maculatus

Binomial name
- Lotus maculatus Breitf.

Synonyms
- Heinekenia maculata (Breitf.) G.Kunkel

= Lotus maculatus =

Plant species in the pea family

Lotus maculatus, commonly known as fire vine or pico de paloma manchada, is a species of legume endemic to the Canary Islands.

== Description ==
Lotus maculatus is a trailing herbaceous plant with slightly woody stem bases. The stems often reach 1.5 meters in length or even 2.5 m, but do not exceed 30 centimeters in cultivation. The plant is nearly hairless with grey-green leaves and stems, though often touched with pink during the summer. Its stems are woody at their base and have a length of 3.5 to 4.5 cm between nodes where leaves attach with side branches of the same length.

It is very similar in appearance to lotus vine flower (Lotus berthelotii), also native to the islands, but has wider leaves its flowers are yellow with orange-red tips where the lotus vine flower has red flowers.

== Taxonomy ==
Lotus maculatus was scientifically described by Charlotte Breitfeld (1902–2003) and named in 2008. This unusual state is because while she described the plant in 1973, it was improperly done from multiple specimens. Therefore, it was described again in 2008 by Nicholas Hind using one holotype as required by the International Code of Botanical Nomenclature, but again crediting the work of Breitfeld.

=== Names ===
It is known by the common names of fire vine or pigeon beak, however other species such as Lotus berthelotii are also known as pigeon beak. In Spanish on the islands it is called pico de paloma manchada, "spotted dove beak".

== Range and habitat ==
This species grows in the wild in a small area on the north side of the island of Tenerife. When assessed in 2011 only 28 plants were known to grow outside of cultivation and their numbers were decreasing. All of its range is found between elevations of 20 and 30 meters above sea level.

== Sources ==
Books

- Atkinson, Robert E. (1970). The Complete Book of Groundcovers; Lawns You Don't have to Mow. New York: David McKay Company. OCLC 99897.
- Barnard, Loretta; Doggett, Dannielle; Doig, Fiona; Etherington, Kate, eds. (2003). Flora's Plant Names. Portland, Oregon: Timber Press. ISBN 978-0-88192-605-7. OCLC 52948957.
- Bramwell, David; Bramwell, Zoë I. (1974). Wild Flowers of the Canary Islands. London: Stanley Thornes (Publishers] Ltd. ISBN 978-0-85950-010-4. OCLC 1602895.
- Bramwell, David (1997). Flora de las Islas Canarias: guía de bolsillo [Flora of the Canary Islands: Pocket Guide] (in Spanish). Translated by de la Torre, Luisa; Echevarría, Pilar; López, Juan M. Madrid, Spain: Rueda. ISBN 978-84-7207-102-5. OCLC 849289131.
- IUCN (International Union for Conservation of Nature) (2011). Species on the Edge of Survival. Gland, Switzerland; Glasgow: IUCN; HarperCollins. ISBN 978-0-00-741914-2. OCLC 756592239.

Journals

- Hind, Nicholas (May 2008). "619. LOTUS MACULATUS: Leguminosae – Papilionoidae Plant in Peril 30". Curtis's Botanical Magazine. 25 (2): 146–157. doi:10.1111/j.1467-8748.2008.00613.x.

Web sources

- Marrero Gómez, M.V.; Mesa Coello, R. (2011). "Lotus maculatus". IUCN Red List of Threatened Species. 2011 e.T165214A5991061. doi:10.2305/IUCN.UK.2011-1.RLTS.T165214A5991061.en.
- "Lotus maculatus Breitf". Plants of the World Online. Royal Botanic Gardens, Kew.
