= Fire Vine =

Fire vine may refer to two species of plant:

- Ipomoea lobata a species of flowering plant in the morning glory family native to South and Latin America
- Lotus maculatus a species of flowering plant in the pea family native to the Canary Islands
