= Stenidea gomerae =

Scientific classification
- Domain: Eukaryota
- Kingdom: Animalia
- Phylum: Arthropoda
- Class: Insecta
- Order: Coleoptera
- Suborder: Polyphaga
- Infraorder: Cucujiformia
- Family: Cerambycidae
- Genus: Stenidea
- Species: S. gomerae

Binomial name
- Stenidea gomerae (Sama, 1996)

Synonyms
- Deroplia gomerae Sama, 1996

Species of beetle

Stenidea gomerae is a species of beetle in the family Cerambycidae. It was described by Sama in 1996, originally under the genus Deroplia. It is known from the Canary Islands.
