= Stenidea albida =

Scientific classification
- Domain: Eukaryota
- Kingdom: Animalia
- Phylum: Arthropoda
- Class: Insecta
- Order: Coleoptera
- Suborder: Polyphaga
- Infraorder: Cucujiformia
- Family: Cerambycidae
- Genus: Stenidea
- Species: S. albida

Binomial name
- Stenidea albida (Brullé, 1838)

Synonyms
- Cerambyx (Monochamus) albidus Brullé, 1838; Deroplia albida (Brullé) Sama, 1996; Stenidea annulicornis (Brullé) Breuning, 1959 (partim.)

Species of beetle

Stenidea albida is a species of beetle in the family Cerambycidae. It was described by Brullé in 1838, originally under the genus Cerambyx. It is known from the Canary Islands. It feeds on Euphorbia aphylla Euphorbia balsamifera Euphorbia canariensis, and Euphorbia regis-jubae.
