= Stenidea simplex =

Scientific classification
- Domain: Eukaryota
- Kingdom: Animalia
- Phylum: Arthropoda
- Class: Insecta
- Order: Coleoptera
- Suborder: Polyphaga
- Infraorder: Cucujiformia
- Family: Cerambycidae
- Genus: Stenidea
- Species: S. simplex

Binomial name
- Stenidea simplex (Fåhraeus, 1872)

Synonyms
- Amblesthidus simplex Fåhraeus, 1872; Deroplia (Amblesthidius) simplex (Fåhraeus, 1872); Deroplia simplex (Fåhraeus, 1872)

Species of beetle

Stenidea simplex is a species of beetle in the family Cerambycidae. It was described by Fåhraeus in 1872, originally under the genus Amblesthidus. It is known from Ethiopia, Malawi, Kenya, South Africa, Mozambique, and Zimbabwe.
