= Stenidea niveopicta =

Scientific classification
- Domain: Eukaryota
- Kingdom: Animalia
- Phylum: Arthropoda
- Class: Insecta
- Order: Coleoptera
- Suborder: Polyphaga
- Infraorder: Cucujiformia
- Family: Cerambycidae
- Genus: Stenidea
- Species: S. niveopicta

Binomial name
- Stenidea niveopicta Demelt, 1982

Synonyms
- Deroplia niveopicta (Demelt) Sama, 1996

Species of beetle

Stenidea niveopicta is a species of beetle in the family Cerambycidae. It was described by Demelt in 1982. It is known from the Canary Islands.
