= Jardín Botánico Canario Viera y Clavijo =

Botanical garden in Tafira Alta, Gran Canaria

Coordinates: 28.0636°N 15.4633°W

Jardín Botánico Canario Viera y Clavijo is the full name of the botanical garden on Gran Canaria, one of the Canary Islands. "Jardín Botánico Canario" means "Botanical Garden of the Canaries", while the additional words "Viera y Clavijo" honor the pioneering Spanish cleric and scholar José Viera y Clavijo (1731–1813), who attempted to found a botanical garden in the Canary Islands in the late eighteenth century.

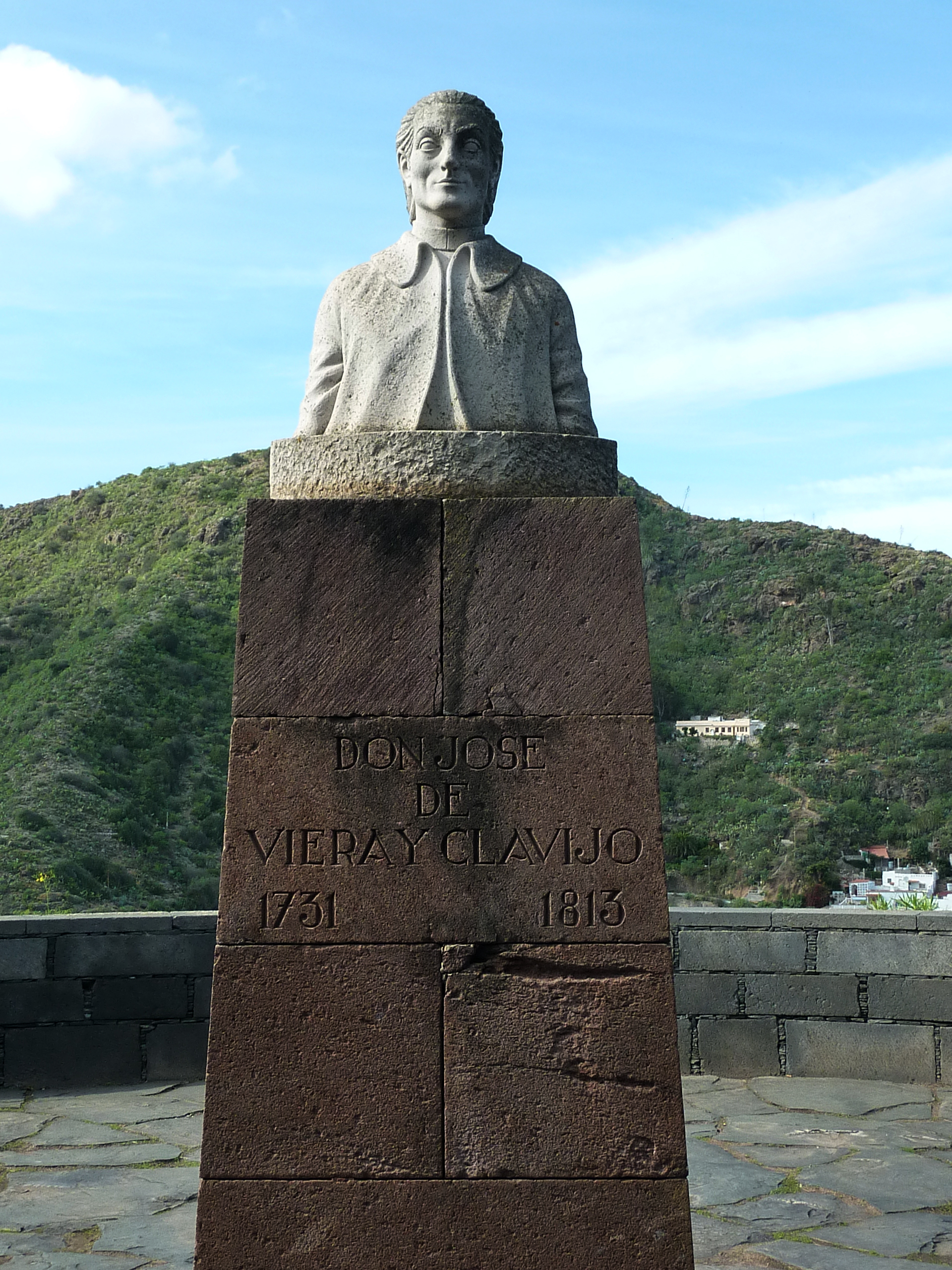
Bust of José de Viera y Clavijo near the garden entrance

The Botanical Garden Viera y Clavijo is located in the northeast of Gran Canaria, in Tafira Alta, approximately 7 kilometers southwest of the capital city Las Palmas. Thus it is located inland from Las Palmas, a few kilometers away from Santa Brígida.

== History ==
Establishing this botanical garden was the life work of the Swedish-Spanish botanist Erik Ragnar Svensson (1910–1973), who devoted many years to searching for the optimal site, one that could successfully accommodate as many as possible of the highly diverse plant species of the Canary Islands. He finally settled on a steep slope of the Barranco de Guiniguada in the vicinity of Tafira Alta, featuring a waterfall and shallow caves in the cliff face. Work on laying out the garden began in 1952, and the Jardín Botánico Canario Viera y Clavijo was officially opened in 1959. Svensson served as its first director. Following Svensson's death in a traffic accident in 1973, David Bramwell was appointed his successor in 1974.

== Description ==
The garden comprises approximately 27 acres (10 hectares), on which approximately 500 plant species endemic to the Canary Islands are cultivated. Important divisions are the "Garden of the Islands" (Jardín de las Islas), the "Garden of Cacti and Succulents" (Jardín de Cactus y Suculentas), where approximately 10,000 cultivars of succulents are on display, the "Macaronesian Ornamental Garden" (Jardín Macaronésico Ornamental), and the “Hidden Garden” (El Jardín Escondido) with greenhouse. Also worthy of mention are the pinetum (El Pínar) and the "Laurel-leaved Forests" (Bosque de Laurísílva), featuring trees which once covered most of Macaronesia prior to Spanish settlement. At the "Fountain of the Wisemen" (La Fuente de Los Sabios), botanists who discovered and described the flora of the Canary Islands are honored.

In 1983, the garden established a seed bank for the roughly 400 tree species endemic to the Canaries and other Macaronesian islands. A germplasm bank was subsequently established. A great number of species have been identified and described by botanists associated with the garden over the past several years, and the garden contributes to species preservation programs through its research work. Its facilities include a library, a herbarium, and laboratories, and it publishes the journal Botánica Macaronésica.

The garden is open to visitors year round.

== Gallery ==
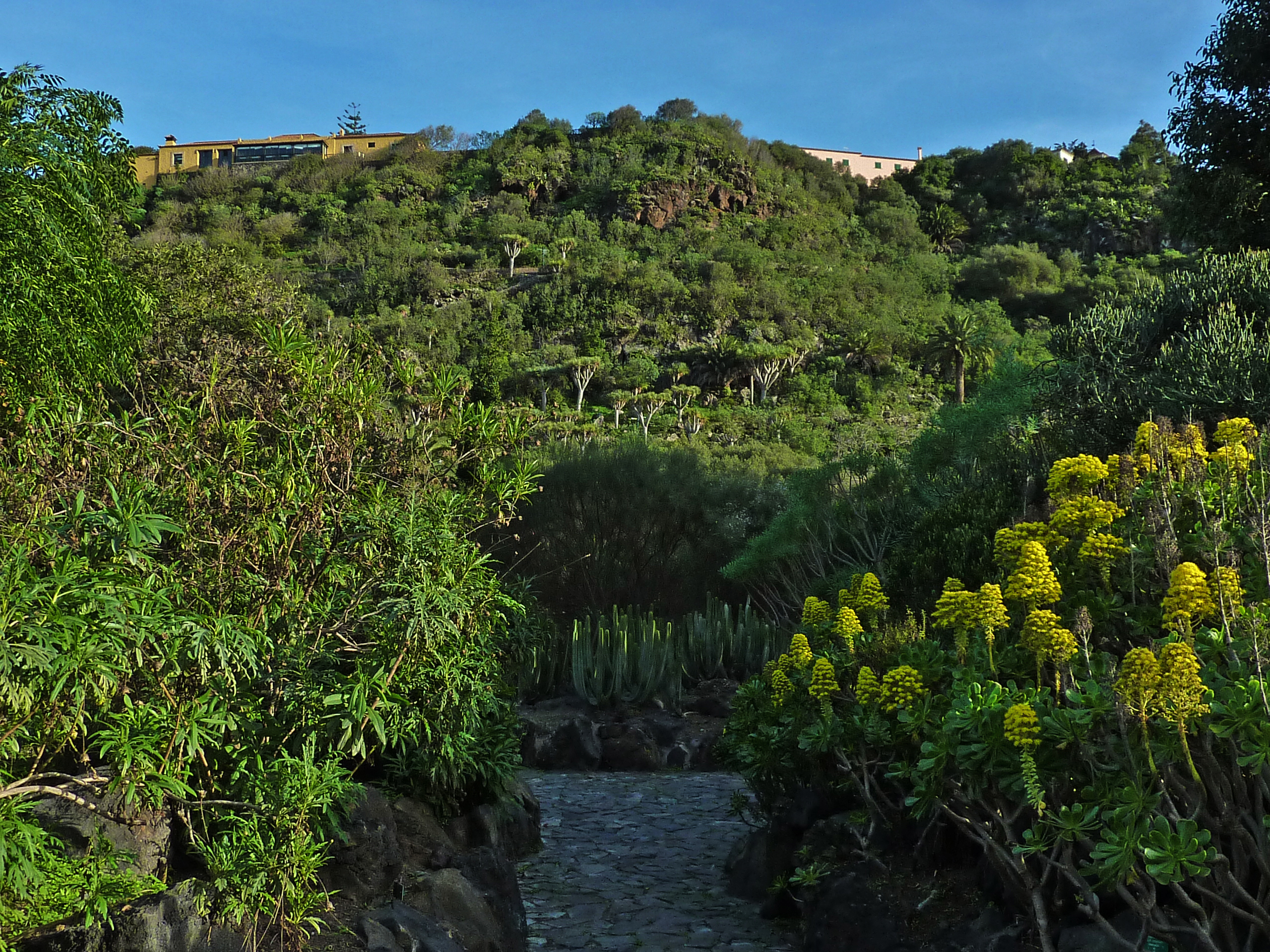
The garden

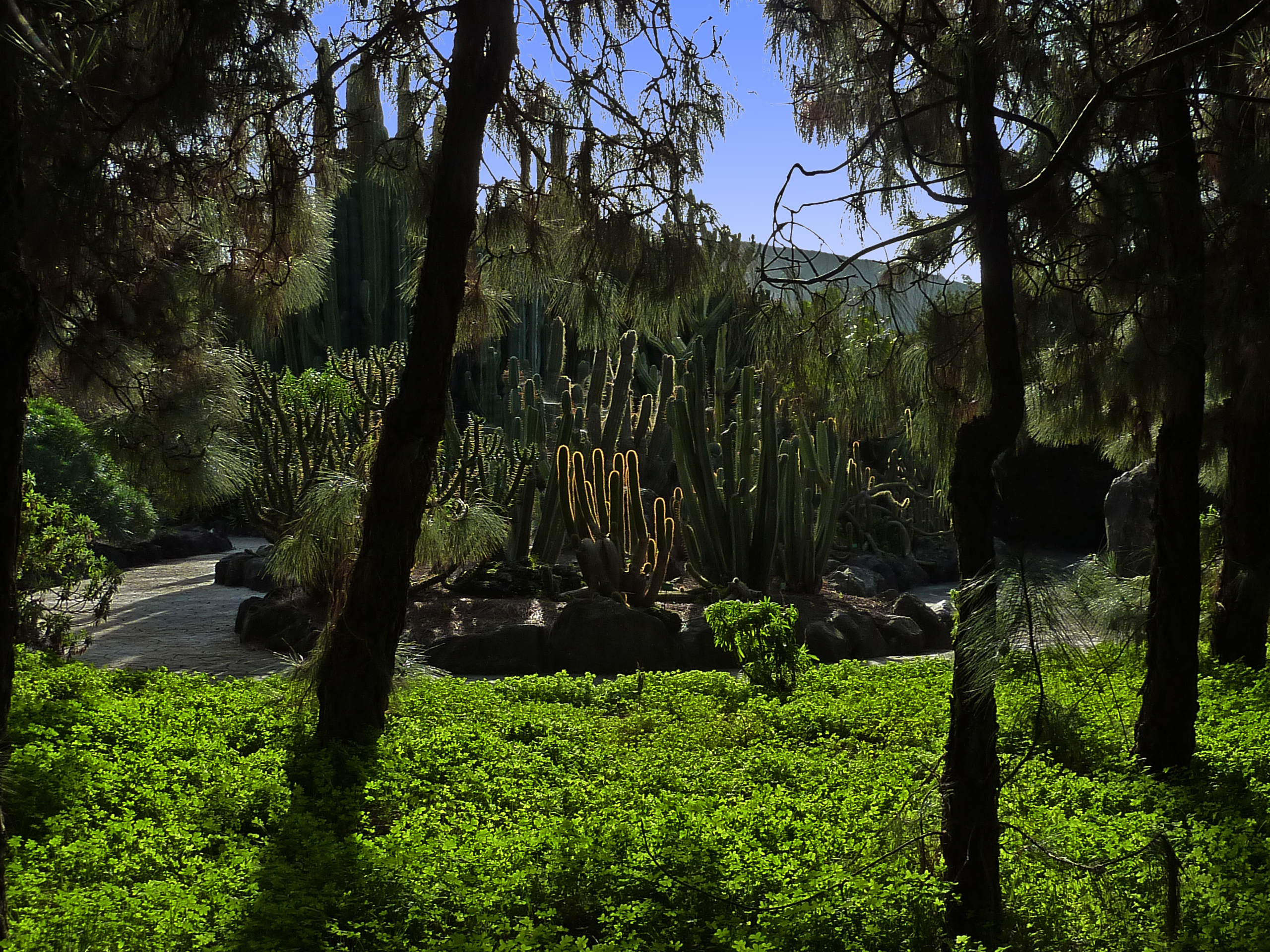
Cacti and euphorbias

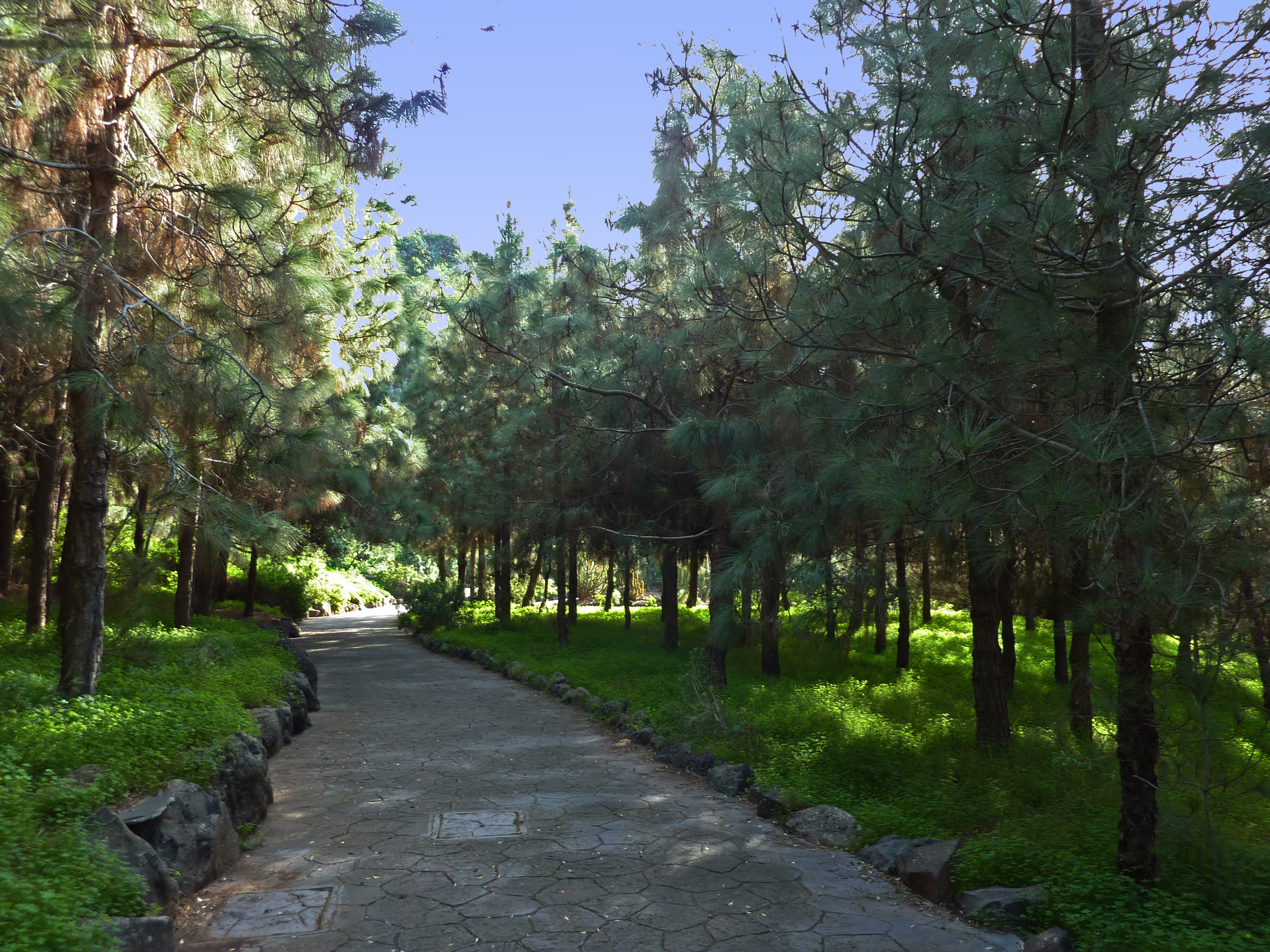
The pine forest

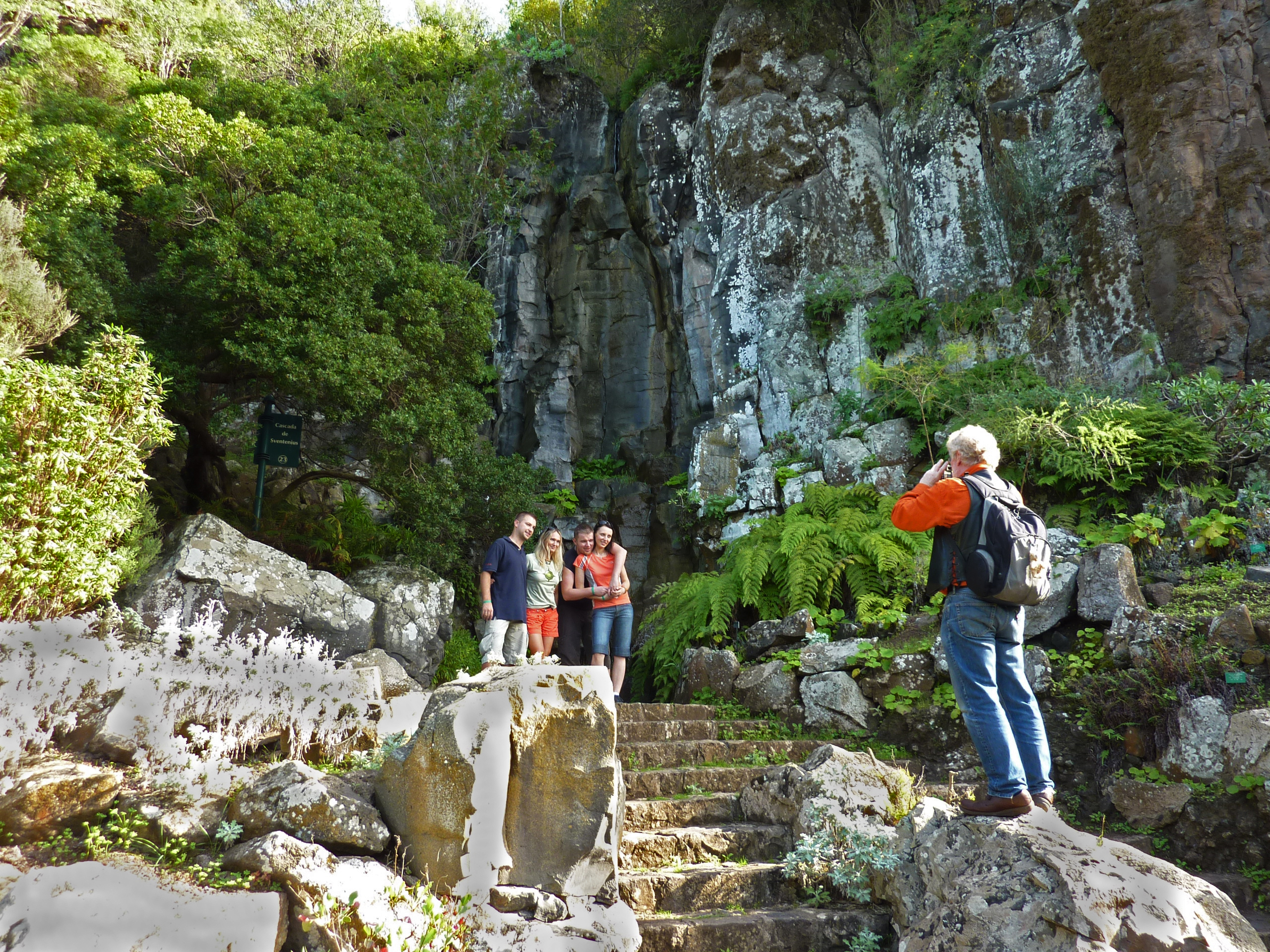
The waterfall

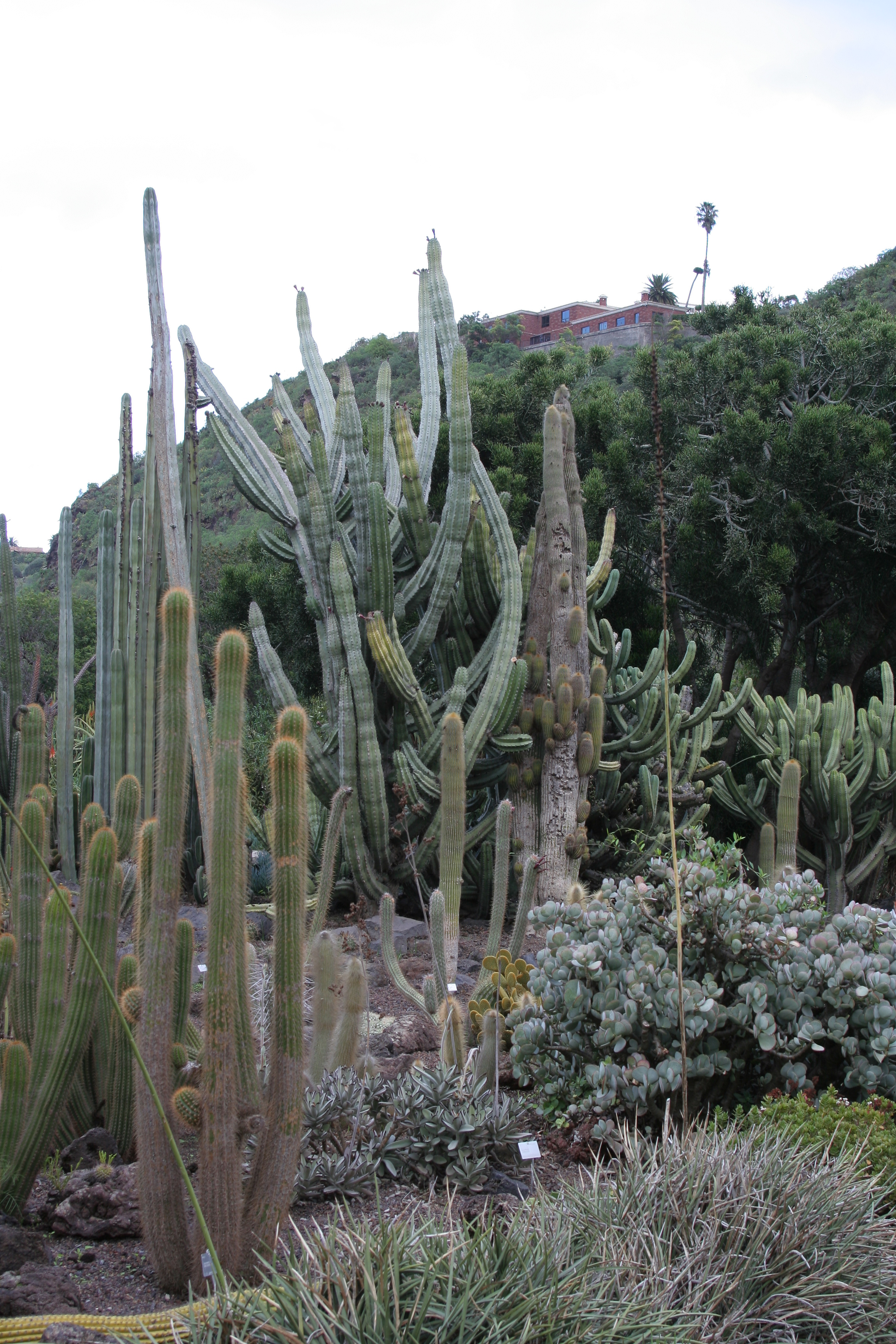
The garden of cacti

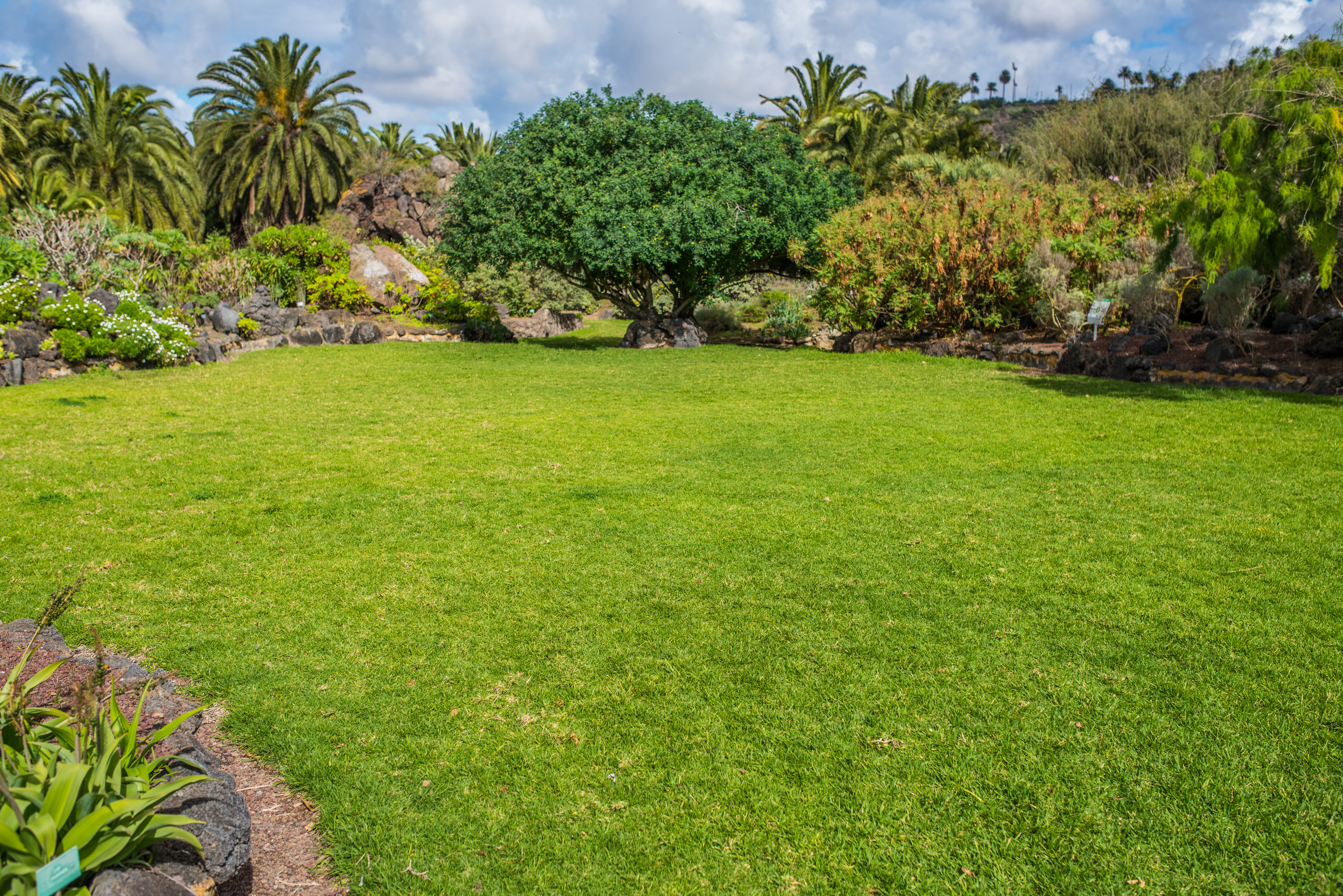
Jardín de Viera y Clavijo

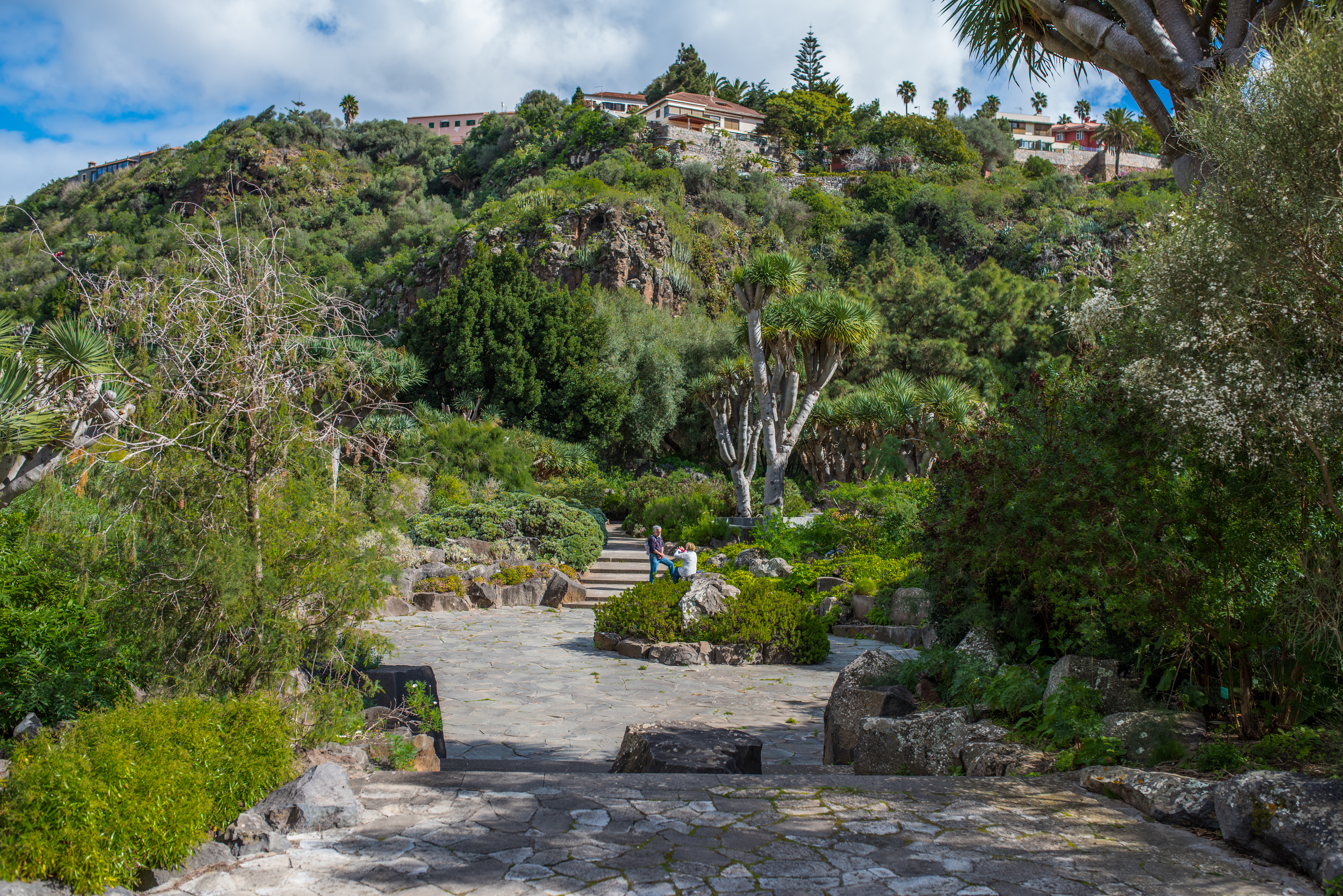
Jardín de Viera y Clavijo

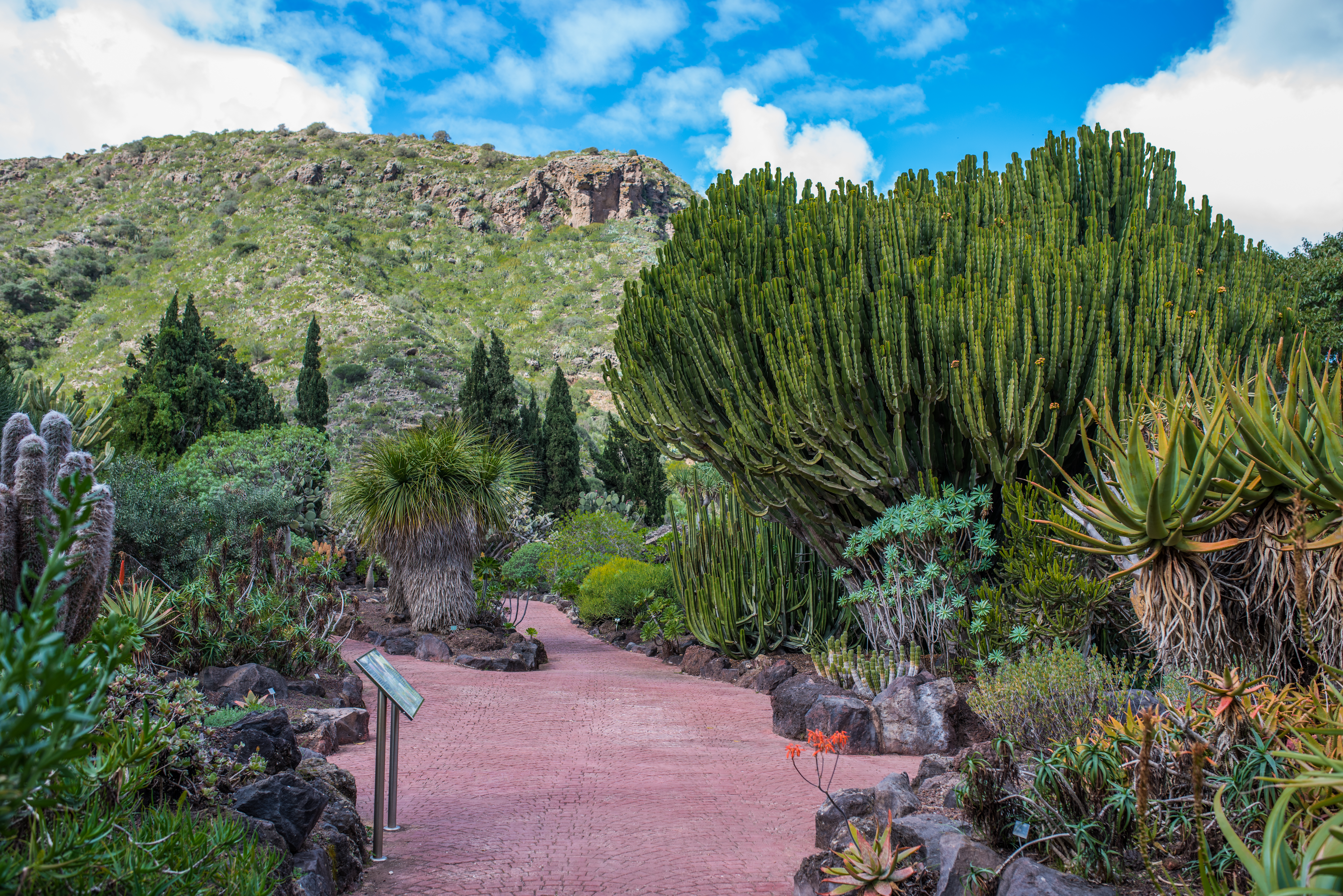
Jardín de Viera y Clavijo

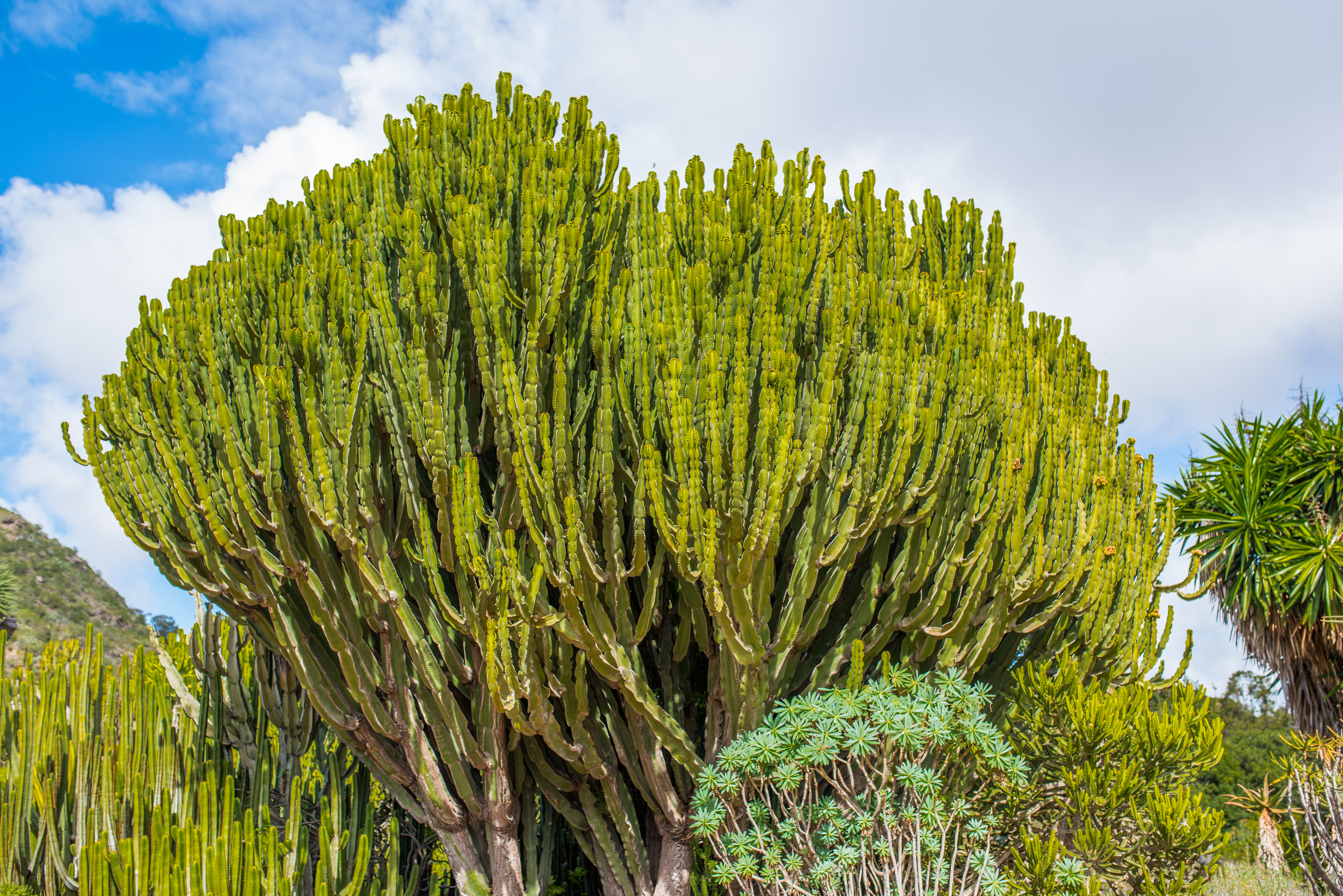
Jardín de Viera y Clavijo

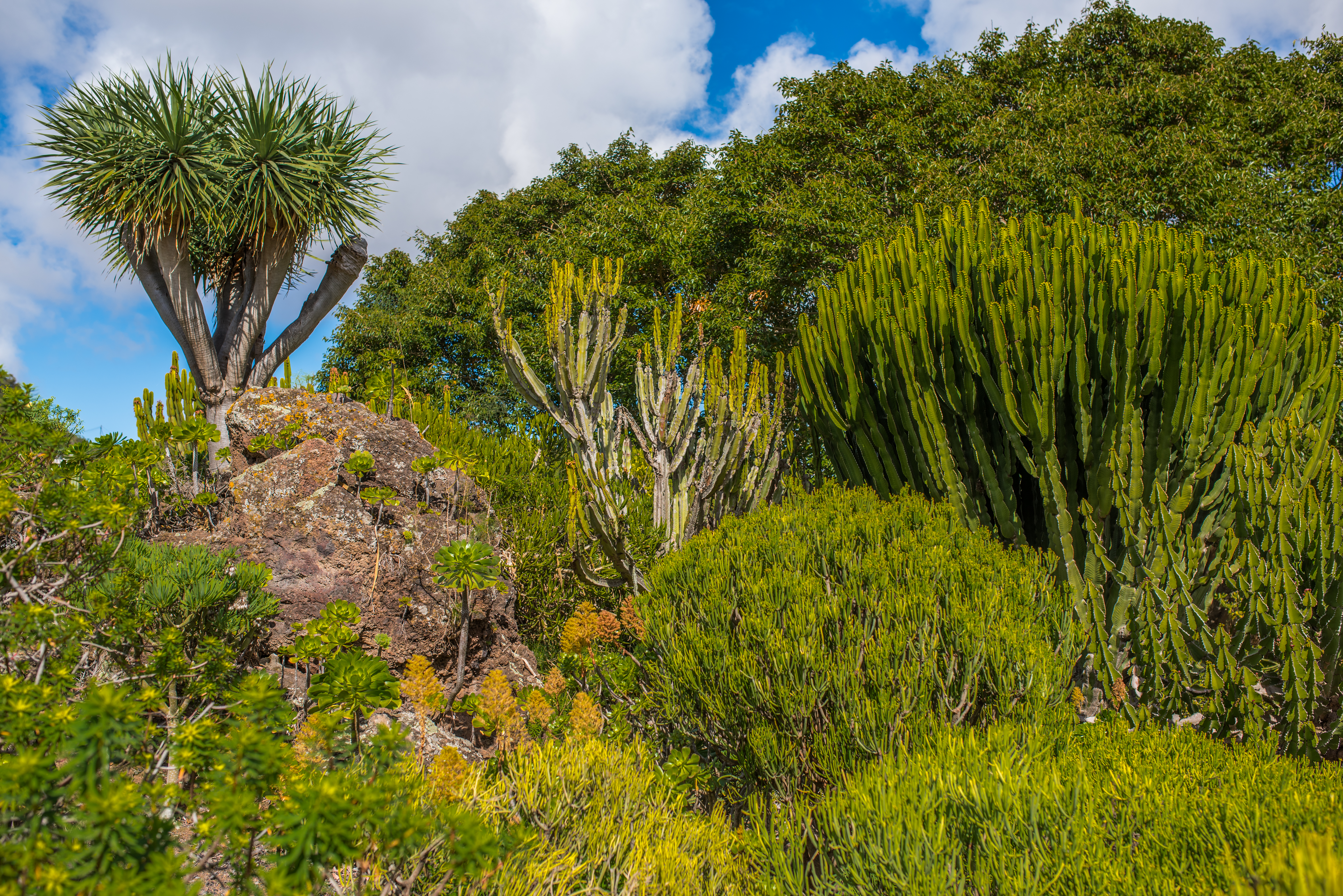
Jardín de Viera y Clavijo

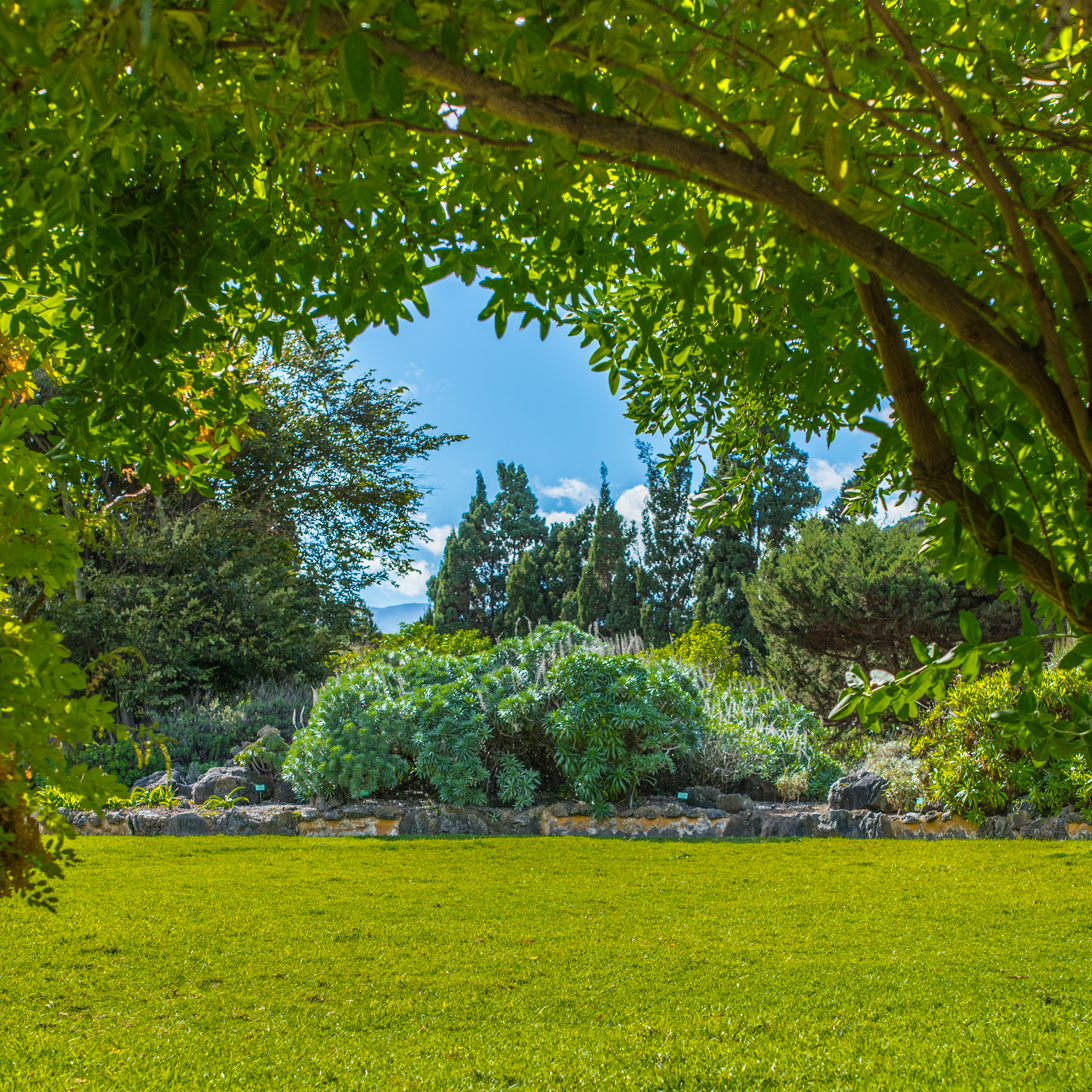
Jardín de Viera y Clavijo

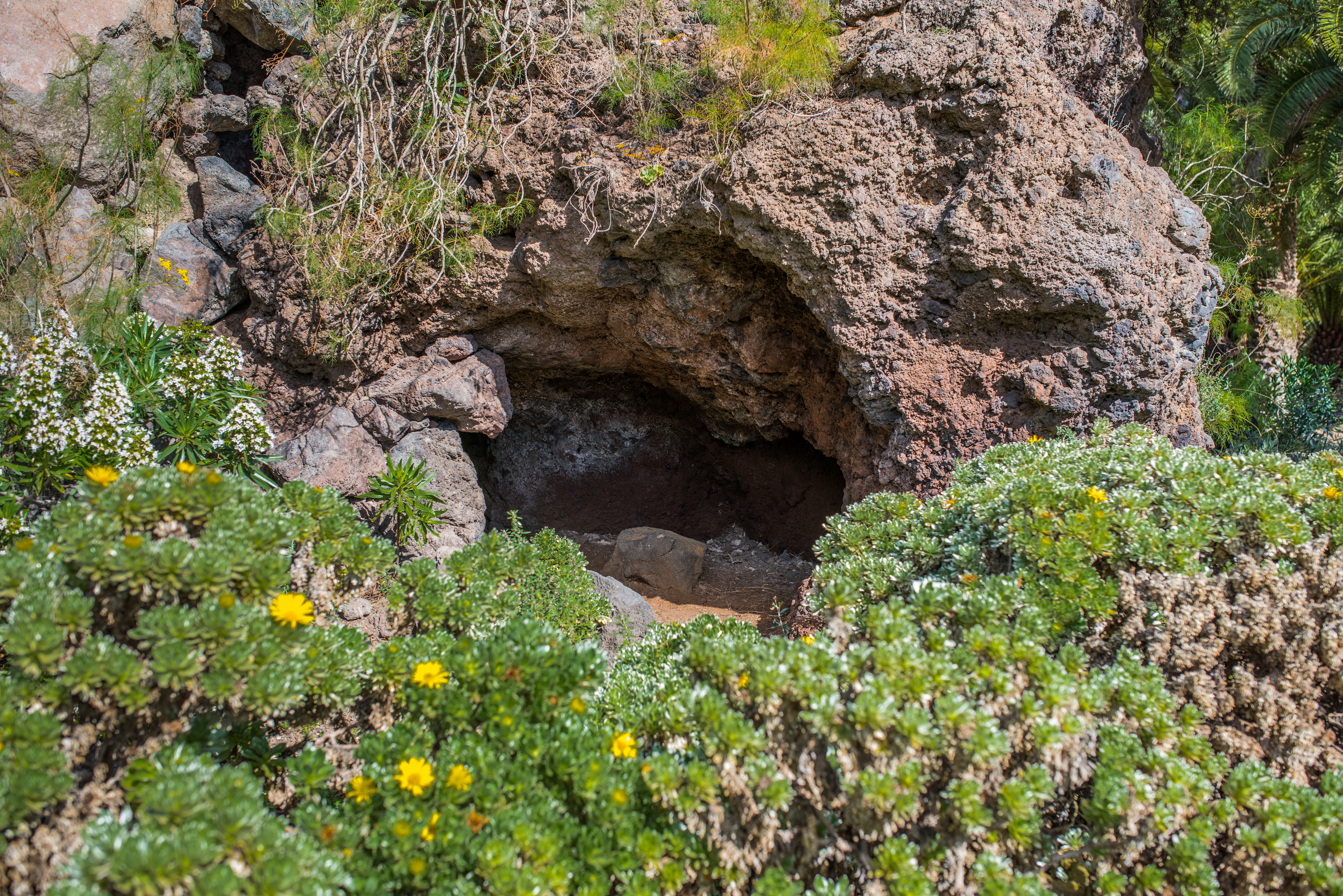
Jardín de Viera y Clavijo
