= Stenidea pilosa =

Scientific classification
- Domain: Eukaryota
- Kingdom: Animalia
- Phylum: Arthropoda
- Class: Insecta
- Order: Coleoptera
- Suborder: Polyphaga
- Infraorder: Cucujiformia
- Family: Cerambycidae
- Genus: Stenidea
- Species: S. pilosa

Binomial name
- Stenidea pilosa (Wollaston, 1862)

Synonyms
- Deroplia pilosa (Wollaston) Sama, 1996; Stenidea machadoi Demelt, 1982

Species of beetle

Stenidea pilosa is a species of beetle in the family Cerambycidae. It was described by Thomas Vernon Wollaston in 1862 and is known from the Canary Islands.
