= Stenidea fairmairei =

Scientific classification
- Domain: Eukaryota
- Kingdom: Animalia
- Phylum: Arthropoda
- Class: Insecta
- Order: Coleoptera
- Suborder: Polyphaga
- Infraorder: Cucujiformia
- Family: Cerambycidae
- Genus: Stenidea
- Species: S. fairmairei

Binomial name
- Stenidea fairmairei Aurivillius, 1922

Species of beetle

Stenidea fairmairei is a species of beetle in the family Cerambycidae. It was described by Per Olof Christopher Aurivillius in 1922. It is known from Djibouti, Ethiopia, Kenya, Somalia, Sudan, Tanzania and Zanzibar.
