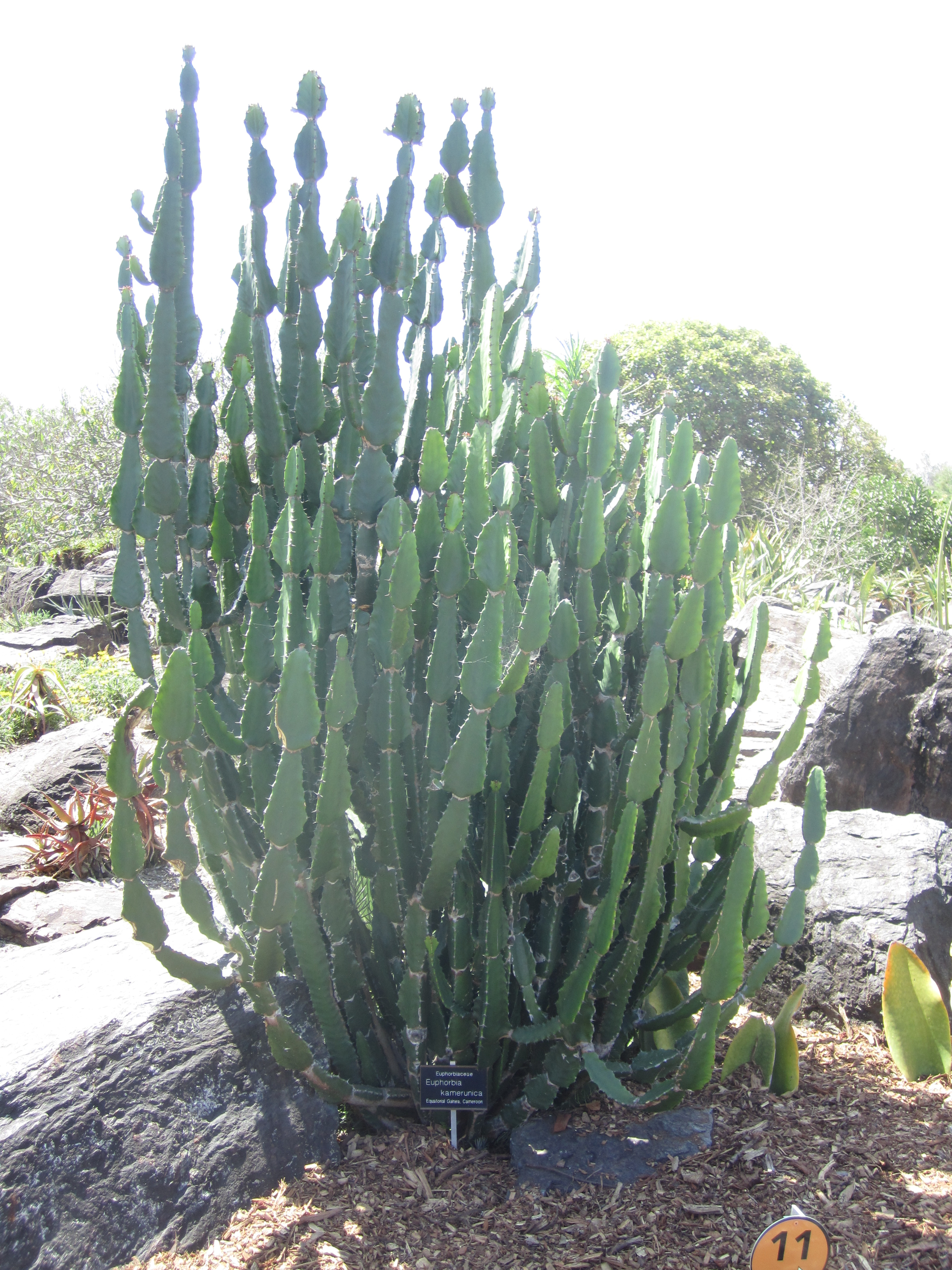

Scientific classification
- Kingdom: Plantae
- Clade: Embryophytes
- Clade: Tracheophytes
- Clade: Spermatophytes
- Clade: Angiosperms
- Clade: Eudicots
- Clade: Rosids
- Order: Malpighiales
- Family: Euphorbiaceae
- Tribe: Euphorbieae
- Subtribe: Euphorbiinae
- Genus: Euphorbia
- Species: E. kamerunica

Binomial name
- Euphorbia kamerunica Pax, 1905

= Euphorbia kamerunica =

Species of flowering plant in the spurge family

Euphorbia kamerunica is a flowering plant in the spurge family Euphorbiaceae. It is distributed across the Sahel of Africa, including in Nigeria, Cameroon, Chad, and Ethiopia.

== Common names ==
In Nigeria, it is commonly called "cactus", although it is not a true cactus.

It is called yěp in the Berom language.

== Uses ==
=== Fencing ===
Euphorbia kamerunica is used as fencing in central Nigeria. The spines are dangerous to animals, and its toxic milky sap discourages large animals from getting in or out. Jatropha curcas and Newbouldia laevis are also used as fencing in Nigeria. Roger Blench (2017) has also proposed Commiphora africana, Erythrina abyssinica, Gliricidia sepium, Leucaena leucocephala, and Caesalpinia bonduc as possible options for plant-based fencing in Nigeria.

=== Poison arrows ===
The Fali people living near Garoua, northern Cameroon use the poisonous sap of Euphorbia kamerunica to make poison arrows.

=== Musical instruments ===
It is called yěp in the Berom language. The Berom people use it to make a scraper or guiro-like instrument called gwák or gwàshák.

== See also ==
- Euphorbia balsamifera
