= Stenidea hesperus =

Scientific classification
- Domain: Eukaryota
- Kingdom: Animalia
- Phylum: Arthropoda
- Class: Insecta
- Order: Coleoptera
- Suborder: Polyphaga
- Infraorder: Cucujiformia
- Family: Cerambycidae
- Genus: Stenidea
- Species: S. hesperus

Binomial name
- Stenidea hesperus Wollaston, 1863

Synonyms
- Deroplia hesperus (Wollaston) Sama, 1996

Species of beetle

Stenidea hesperus is a species of beetle in the family Cerambycidae. It was described by Thomas Vernon Wollaston in 1863. It is known from the Canary Islands.
