= Stenidea lateralis =

Scientific classification
- Domain: Eukaryota
- Kingdom: Animalia
- Phylum: Arthropoda
- Class: Insecta
- Order: Coleoptera
- Suborder: Polyphaga
- Infraorder: Cucujiformia
- Family: Cerambycidae
- Genus: Stenidea
- Species: S. lateralis

Binomial name
- Stenidea lateralis Aurivillius, 1908

Synonyms
- Amblesthidus lateralis Aurivillius, 1908; Xenicoteloides damarensis Breuning, 1939

Species of beetle

Stenidea lateralis is a species of beetle in the family Cerambycidae. It was described by Per Olof Christopher Aurivillius in 1908 and is known from Namibia.
