= Stenidea varii =

Scientific classification
- Kingdom: Animalia
- Phylum: Arthropoda
- Class: Insecta
- Order: Coleoptera
- Suborder: Polyphaga
- Infraorder: Cucujiformia
- Family: Cerambycidae
- Genus: Stenidea
- Species: S. varii

Binomial name
- Stenidea varii Breuning, 1981

Species of beetle

Stenidea varii is a species of beetle in the family Cerambycidae. It was described by Stephan von Breuning in 1981. It is known from South Africa.
