= Stenidea floccifera =

Scientific classification
- Domain: Eukaryota
- Kingdom: Animalia
- Phylum: Arthropoda
- Class: Insecta
- Order: Coleoptera
- Suborder: Polyphaga
- Infraorder: Cucujiformia
- Family: Cerambycidae
- Genus: Stenidea
- Species: S. floccifera

Binomial name
- Stenidea floccifera (Kolbe, 1893)

Synonyms
- Belodera floccifera Kolbe, 1893

Species of beetle

Stenidea floccifera is a species of beetle in the family Cerambycidae. It was described by Kolbe in 1893, originally under the genus Belodera. It is known from Kenya and Tanzania.
