= Stenidea bituberosa =

Scientific classification
- Kingdom: Animalia
- Phylum: Arthropoda
- Class: Insecta
- Order: Coleoptera
- Suborder: Polyphaga
- Infraorder: Cucujiformia
- Family: Cerambycidae
- Genus: Stenidea
- Species: S. bituberosa

Binomial name
- Stenidea bituberosa Breuning, 1940

Species of beetle

Stenidea bituberosa is a species of beetle in the family Cerambycidae. It was described by Stephan von Breuning in 1940. It is known from Ethiopia, Kenya, Tanzania and Uganda.
