= Stenidea =

Scientific classification
- Domain: Eukaryota
- Kingdom: Animalia
- Phylum: Arthropoda
- Class: Insecta
- Order: Coleoptera
- Suborder: Polyphaga
- Infraorder: Cucujiformia
- Family: Cerambycidae
- Tribe: Desmiphorini
- Genus: Stenidea

Genus of beetles

Stenidea is a genus of longhorn beetles of the subfamily Lamiinae, containing the following species:

subgenus Amblesthidus

- Stenidea affinis (Fairmaire, 1894)
- Stenidea bituberosa Breuning, 1940
- Stenidea elongata (Breuning, 1939)
- Stenidea excavata Breuning, 1942
- Stenidea insignis (Distant, 1898)
- Stenidea lateralis Aurivillius, 1908
- Stenidea nigrolineata Breuning, 1942
- Stenidea proxima Breuning, 1942
- Stenidea setipennis Breuning, 1970
- Stenidea simplex (Fåhraeus, 1872)
- Stenidea verticalis (Thomson, 1868)

subgenus Amblesthis

- Stenidea alutacea (Thomson, 1860)
- Stenidea besnardi Breuning, 1971
- Stenidea nemorensis (Thomson, 1860)
- Stenidea seriepilosa Kirsch, 1889
- Stenidea varii Breuning, 1981

subgenus Stenidea

- Stenidea albida (Brullé, 1838)
- Stenidea annulicornis (Brullé, 1838)
- Stenidea costigera Demelt, 1982
- Stenidea densevestita (Fairmaire, 1890)
- Stenidea fairmairei Aurivillius, 1922
- Stenidea floccifera (Kolbe, 1893)
- Stenidea gemina (Pascoe, 1888)
- Stenidea genei (Aragona, 1830)
- Stenidea gertiana (Sama, 1996)
- Stenidea gomerae (Sama, 1996)
- Stenidea hesperus Wollaston, 1863
- Stenidea lorenzoi (García, 2002)
- Stenidea niveopicta Demelt, 1982
- Stenidea pilosa (Wollaston, 1862)
- Stenidea schurmanni (Sama, 1996)
- Stenidea troberti Mulsant, 1843
