= Stenidea gemina =

Scientific classification
- Domain: Eukaryota
- Kingdom: Animalia
- Phylum: Arthropoda
- Class: Insecta
- Order: Coleoptera
- Suborder: Polyphaga
- Infraorder: Cucujiformia
- Family: Cerambycidae
- Genus: Stenidea
- Species: S. gemina

Binomial name
- Stenidea gemina (Pascoe, 1888)

Synonyms
- Amblesthis geminus Pascoe, 1888

Species of beetle

Stenidea gemina is a species of beetle in the family Cerambycidae. It was described by Pascoe in 1888. It is known from South Africa.
