= Stenidea elongata =

Scientific classification
- Kingdom: Animalia
- Phylum: Arthropoda
- Class: Insecta
- Order: Coleoptera
- Suborder: Polyphaga
- Infraorder: Cucujiformia
- Family: Cerambycidae
- Genus: Stenidea
- Species: S. elongata

Binomial name
- Stenidea elongata (Breuning, 1939)

Synonyms
- Zavattaria elongata Breuning, 1939

Species of beetle

Stenidea elongata is a species of beetle in the family Cerambycidae. It was described by Stephan von Breuning in 1939. It is known from Kenya.
