= Stenidea proxima =

Scientific classification
- Kingdom: Animalia
- Phylum: Arthropoda
- Class: Insecta
- Order: Coleoptera
- Suborder: Polyphaga
- Infraorder: Cucujiformia
- Family: Cerambycidae
- Genus: Stenidea
- Species: S. proxima

Binomial name
- Stenidea proxima Breuning, 1942

Species of beetle

Stenidea proxima is a species of beetle in the family Cerambycidae, described by Stephan von Breuning in 1942. It is known from Ethiopia.
