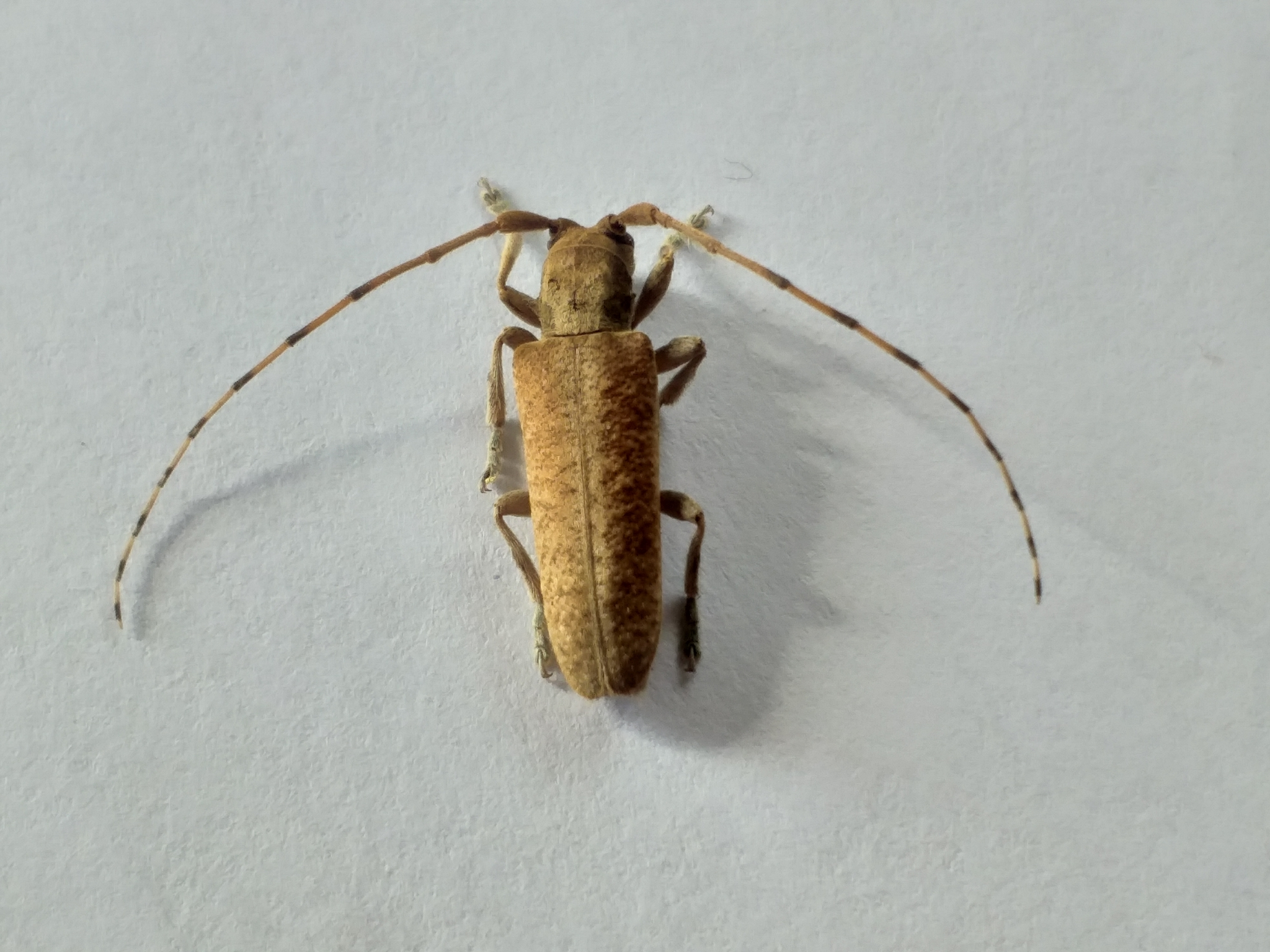
- Found in Zimbabwe

Scientific classification
- Kingdom: Animalia
- Phylum: Arthropoda
- Class: Insecta
- Order: Coleoptera
- Suborder: Polyphaga
- Infraorder: Cucujiformia
- Family: Cerambycidae
- Genus: Stenidea
- Species: S. alutacea

Binomial name
- Stenidea alutacea (Thomson, 1860)

Synonyms
- Amblesthis alutaceus Thomson, 1860; Deroplia alutacea (Thomson) Adlbauer, 1997

= Stenidea alutacea =

Species of beetle

Stenidea alutacea is a species of beetle in the family Cerambycidae. It was described by Thomson in 1860, originally under the genus Amblesthis. It is known from South Africa, Mozambique, and Zimbabwe.
