= Stenidea lorenzoi =

Scientific classification
- Domain: Eukaryota
- Kingdom: Animalia
- Phylum: Arthropoda
- Class: Insecta
- Order: Coleoptera
- Suborder: Polyphaga
- Infraorder: Cucujiformia
- Family: Cerambycidae
- Genus: Stenidea
- Species: S. lorenzoi

Binomial name
- Stenidea lorenzoi (García, 2002)

Synonyms
- Deroplia lorenzoi García, 2002

Species of beetle

Stenidea lorenzoi is a species of beetle in the family Cerambycidae. It was described by García in 2002. It is known from the Canary Islands.
