= Stenidea genei =

Scientific classification
- Domain: Eukaryota
- Kingdom: Animalia
- Phylum: Arthropoda
- Class: Insecta
- Order: Coleoptera
- Suborder: Polyphaga
- Infraorder: Cucujiformia
- Family: Cerambycidae
- Genus: Stenidea
- Species: S. genei

Binomial name
- Stenidea genei (Aragona, 1830)

Synonyms
- Belodera genei (Aragona, 1830); Deroplia genei (Aragona, 1830) Reitter, 1913; Deroplia obliquetruncata Rosenhauer, 1847; Saperda genei Aragona, 1830; Stenosoma foudrasi Mulsant, 1839; ?Deroplia genei (Chevrolat) Dejean, 1835; Deroplia genei naviauxi (Villiers) Sama, 2003

Species of beetle

Stenidea genei is a species of beetle in the family Cerambycidae. It was described by Aragona in 1830, originally under the genus Saperda. It is known from Corsica, Austria, Spain, Bosnia and Herzegovina, Slovakia, Croatia, Hungary, Serbia, Cyprus, Israel, Switzerland, France, Germany (where its population is considered extinct), the Czech Republic, Albania, Iran, Bulgaria, Italy, Romania, Montenegro, Slovenia, and Ukraine.

== Subspecies ==
- Stenidea genei genei (Aragona, 1830)
- Stenidea genei naviauxi Villiers, 1970
