= Stenidea affinis =

Scientific classification
- Kingdom: Animalia
- Phylum: Arthropoda
- Class: Insecta
- Order: Coleoptera
- Suborder: Polyphaga
- Infraorder: Cucujiformia
- Family: Cerambycidae
- Genus: Stenidea
- Species: S. affinis

Binomial name
- Stenidea affinis (Fairmaire, 1894)

Synonyms
- Amblesthidus affinis Fairmaire, 1894

Species of beetle

Stenidea affinis is a species of beetle in the family Cerambycidae. It was described by Fairmaire in 1894. It is known from Kenya, Ethiopia and Tanzania.
