= Stenidea verticalis =

Scientific classification
- Domain: Eukaryota
- Kingdom: Animalia
- Phylum: Arthropoda
- Class: Insecta
- Order: Coleoptera
- Suborder: Polyphaga
- Infraorder: Cucujiformia
- Family: Cerambycidae
- Genus: Stenidea
- Species: S. verticalis

Binomial name
- Stenidea verticalis (Thomson, 1868)

Synonyms
- Amblesthidus amoenus Fairmaire, 1898; Amblesthidus plagiatus Fåhraeus, 1872

Species of beetle

Stenidea verticalis is a species of beetle in the family Cerambycidae. It was described by Thomson in 1868. It is known from South Africa.
