= Stenidea troberti =

Scientific classification
- Domain: Eukaryota
- Kingdom: Animalia
- Phylum: Arthropoda
- Class: Insecta
- Order: Coleoptera
- Suborder: Polyphaga
- Infraorder: Cucujiformia
- Family: Cerambycidae
- Genus: Stenidea
- Species: S. troberti

Binomial name
- Stenidea troberti Mulsant, 1843

Synonyms
- Belodera troberti (Mulsant) Ganglbauer, 1884; Deroplia troberti (Mulsant) Reitter, 1913; Deroplia troberti troberti (Mulsant) Sama, 1996; Deroplia troberti cruciata Sama, 1997

Species of beetle

Stenidea troberti is a species of beetle in the family Cerambycidae. It was described by Mulsant in 1843. It is known from France, Bosnia and Herzegovina, Greece, Crete, Spain, Corsica, Croatia, Morocco, Libya, Malta, Algeria, Sardinia, Italy, Sicily, and Tunisia. It feeds on Nerium oleander.

== Subspecies ==
- Stenidea troberti cruciata (Sama, 1996)
- Stenidea troberti troberti Mulsant, 1843
