= Stenidea insignis =

Scientific classification
- Domain: Eukaryota
- Kingdom: Animalia
- Phylum: Arthropoda
- Class: Insecta
- Order: Coleoptera
- Suborder: Polyphaga
- Infraorder: Cucujiformia
- Family: Cerambycidae
- Genus: Stenidea
- Species: S. insignis

Binomial name
- Stenidea insignis (Distant, 1898)

Synonyms
- Amblesthidus insignis Distant, 1898; Deroplia (Amblesthidius) insignis (Distant, 1898)

Species of beetle

Stenidea insignis is a species of beetle in the family Cerambycidae. It was described by William Lucas Distant in 1898. It is known from Botswana, Burundi, Rwanda, the Ivory Coast, Tanzania, Angola, Kenya, Sierra Leone, Ethiopia, Sudan, Uganda, South Africa, Zambia, and Zimbabwe.
