= Stenidea densevestita =

Scientific classification
- Kingdom: Animalia
- Phylum: Arthropoda
- Class: Insecta
- Order: Coleoptera
- Suborder: Polyphaga
- Infraorder: Cucujiformia
- Family: Cerambycidae
- Genus: Stenidea
- Species: S. densevestita

Binomial name
- Stenidea densevestita (Fairmaire, 1890)

Synonyms
- Stenidea densevestita m. fuscoplagiata Breuning, 1942

Species of beetle

Stenidea densevestita is a species of beetle in the family Cerambycidae. It was described by Fairmaire in 1890. It is known from Djibouti, Somalia, Kenya and Tanzania. It contains the varietas Stenidea densevestita var. fuscoplagiata.
