= Stenidea annulicornis =

Scientific classification
- Domain: Eukaryota
- Kingdom: Animalia
- Phylum: Arthropoda
- Class: Insecta
- Order: Coleoptera
- Suborder: Polyphaga
- Infraorder: Cucujiformia
- Family: Cerambycidae
- Genus: Stenidea
- Species: S. annulicornis

Binomial name
- Stenidea annulicornis (Brullé, 1838)

Synonyms
- Cerambyx (Monochamus) annulicornis Brullé, 1838; Deroplia annulicornis (Brullé, 1838)

Species of beetle

Stenidea annulicornis is a species of beetle in the family Cerambycidae. It was described by Brullé in 1838, originally under the genus Cerambyx. It is known from the Canary Islands.
