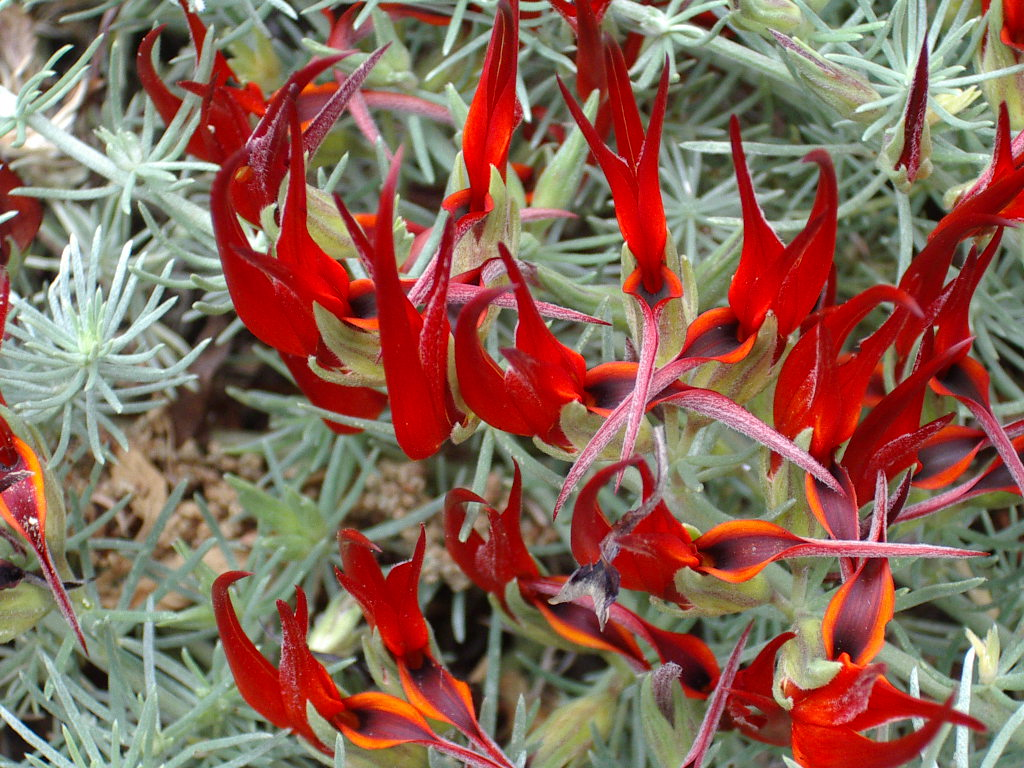

Scientific classification
- Kingdom: Plantae
- Clade: Tracheophytes
- Clade: Angiosperms
- Clade: Eudicots
- Clade: Rosids
- Order: Fabales
- Family: Fabaceae
- Subfamily: Faboideae
- Genus: Lotus
- Species: L. berthelotii

Binomial name
- Lotus berthelotii Lowe ex Masf.

Synonyms
- Heinekenia berthelotii (Masf.) G.Kunkel; Lotus peliorhynchus Hook.f.

= Lotus berthelotii =

Species of legume

Lotus berthelotii is a flowering plant endemic to the Canary Islands of Spain, in the genus Lotus of the pea family Fabaceae. Among its common names are lotus vine flower, parrot (or parrot's) beak, pelican beak, and coral gem. This plant is widely cultivated but is either extinct in the wild or persists as a few individuals. In 1884 it was already classed as "exceedingly rare" and plant collection probably hastened its decline.

== Description ==
Lotus berthelotii is an evergreen prostrate shrub or subshrub, growing to 20 cm (7.9 in) with a creeping or trailing habit. The leaves are divided into 3-5 slender leaflets, each leaflet 1–2 cm long and 1 mm broad, densely covered with fine silvery hairs. The flowers are orange-red to red, shaped like upward facing beaks on short stalks, but slender, 2–4 cm long and 5–8 mm broad.

== Pollination ==
The flowers of Lotus berthelotii and some other Canary Island species appear to be adapted for bird pollination. It was once thought that the original pollinators of these plants (and other genera such as Isoplexis and Canarina) were sunbirds which had become extinct on the Canary Islands, explaining why they are rare and considered endangered species (Vogel 1954; Vogel et al. 1984; Valido et al. 2004). However more recent work has shown that these plants are adequately pollinated by non-specialist flower visiting birds, particularly the Canary Islands chiffchaff (Phylloscopus canariensis), and in fact show some specific adaptations to infrequent pollination by these birds, such as extended flower lifespans.

However, the cultivated population studied by Ollerton et al. (2008) set no fruit, despite the plants receiving large amounts of pollen on their stigmas. This may be because the population was a single, self incompatible clonal genotype; whether this is true of all plants in cultivation is unknown, but may have important implications for the conservation of this species if it is extinct in the wild.

== Cultivation ==
Lotus berthelotii is cultivated as an ornamental plant with its needle-like silvery foliage and red flowers for: traditional gardens, container (pots), and drought tolerant water conserving gardens. It has gained the Royal Horticultural Society's Award of Garden Merit. A golden orange flowering cultivar is also grown. As it is intolerant of freezing temperatures, in cold temperate climates it requires the protection of glass in the winter months. It needs a sheltered spot in full sun.
