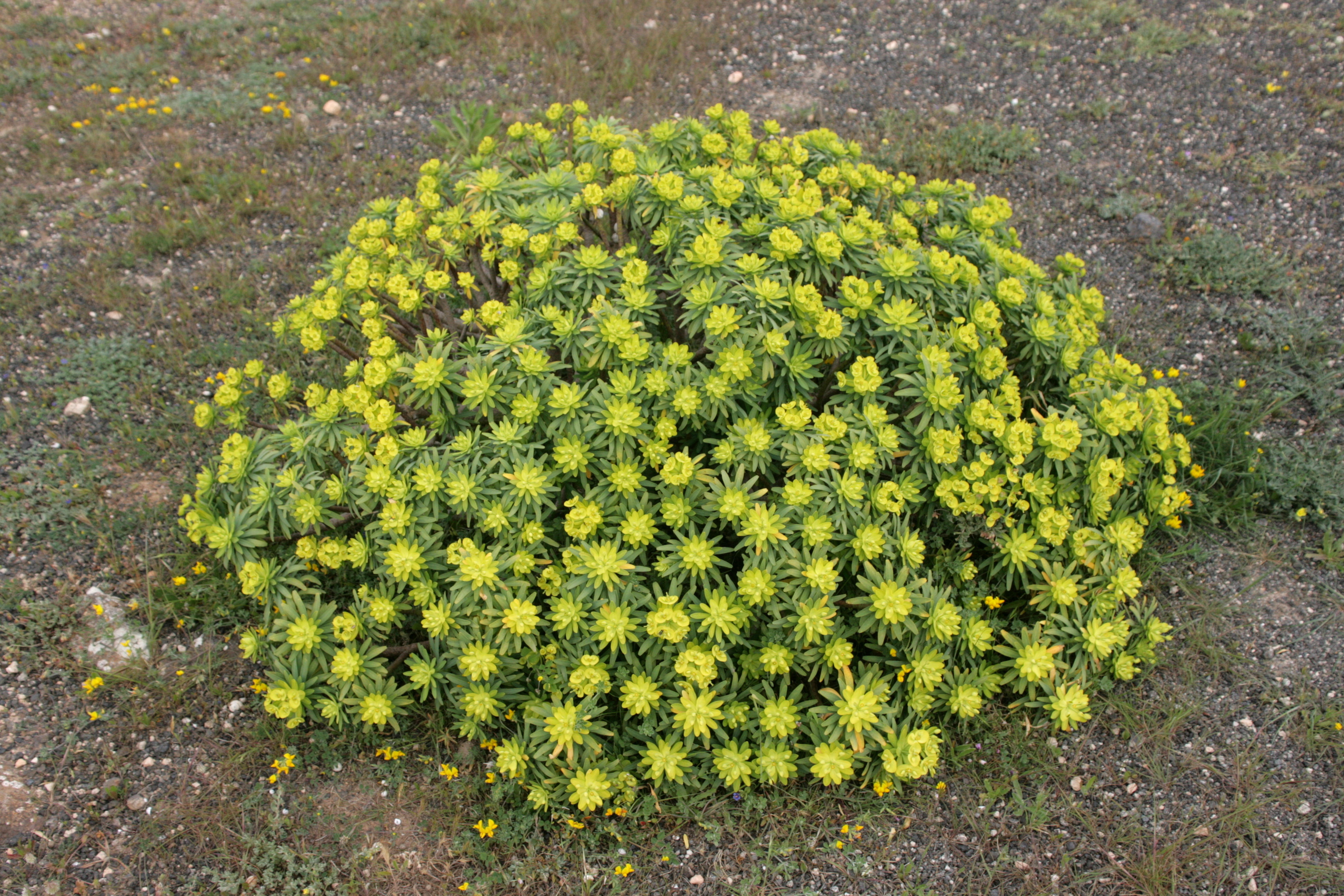
- In habitat, Teguise, Lanzarote
- CITES Appendix II

Scientific classification
- Kingdom: Plantae
- Clade: Tracheophytes
- Clade: Angiosperms
- Clade: Eudicots
- Clade: Rosids
- Order: Malpighiales
- Family: Euphorbiaceae
- Genus: Euphorbia
- Species: E. regis-jubae

Binomial name
- Euphorbia regis-jubae J.Gay

Synonyms
- Tithymalus regis-jubae (J.Gay) Klotzsch & Garcke; Euphorbia obtusifolia subsp. regis-jubae (J.Gay) Maire; Euphorbia virgata subsp. regis-jubae (J.Gay) Soldano; Euphorbia lamarckii subsp. regis-jubae J.Gay) Oudejans; Euphorbia mauritanica Webb ex J.Gay; Euphorbia pseudodendroides H.Lindb.; Euphorbia capazii Caball.

= Euphorbia regis-jubae =

Species of flowering plant

Euphorbia regis-jubae is a species of flowering plant in the family Euphorbiaceae, native to the eastern Canary Islands, western Morocco, north-western Western Sahara. The specific epithet honours the contributions of King Juba II to natural history and his role in bringing the genus to notice. In Spanish, it is known as tabaiba morisca. It has often been confused with Euphorbia lamarckii.

== Description ==
Euphorbia regis-jubae is a shrub, up to 2 m (7 ft) tall. It has light brown stems and terminal rosettes of leaves that are narrow and oblong, with a pointed or somewhat blunt apex. The inflorescences are pedunculate, umbel-like, usually simple with five to eight rays, more rarely compound. The greenish-yellow floral bracts are large, not joined at the base, and persist when the fruit has formed. The fruit capsules are light brown or red. The seeds have a stalked elaiosome (caruncle).

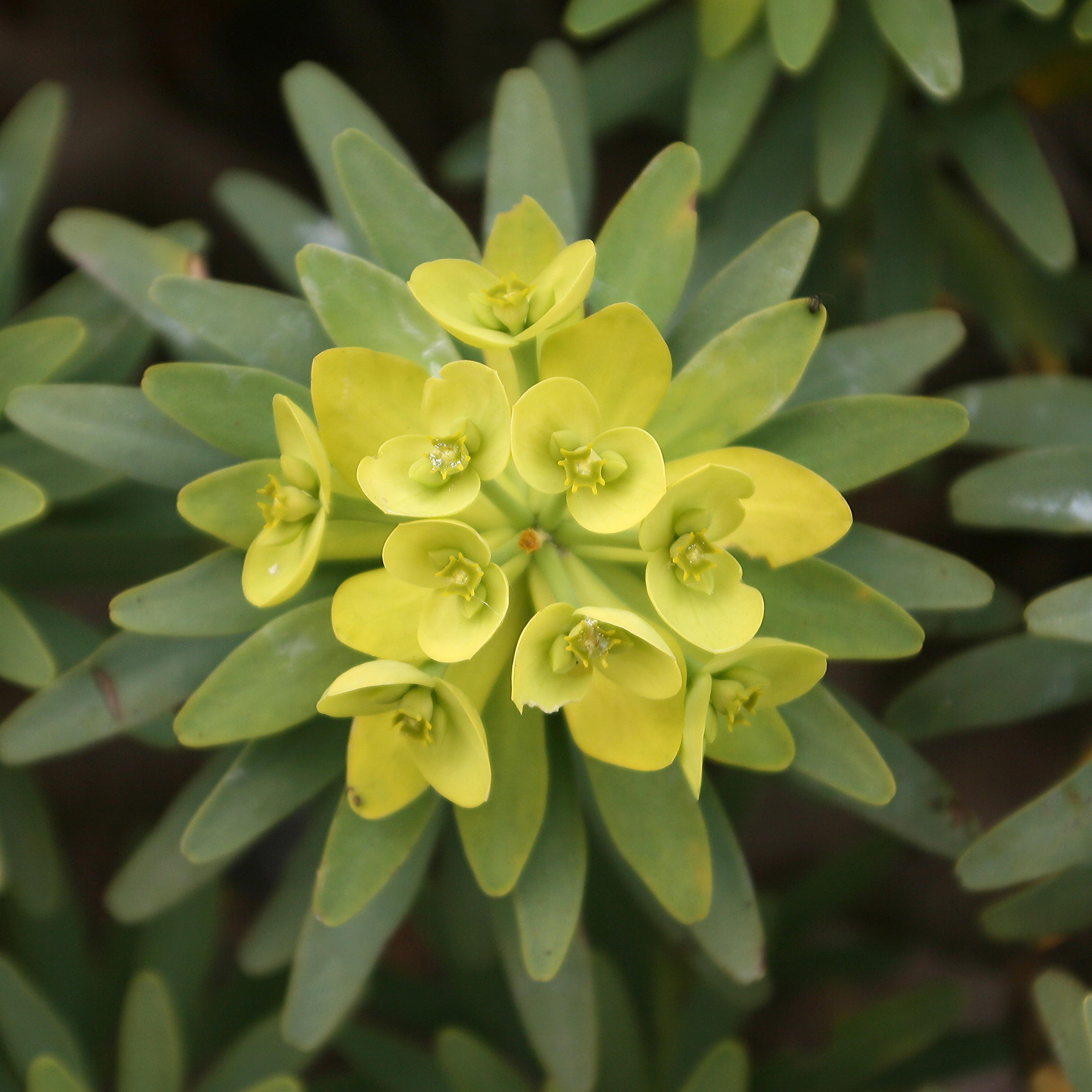
Inflorescence

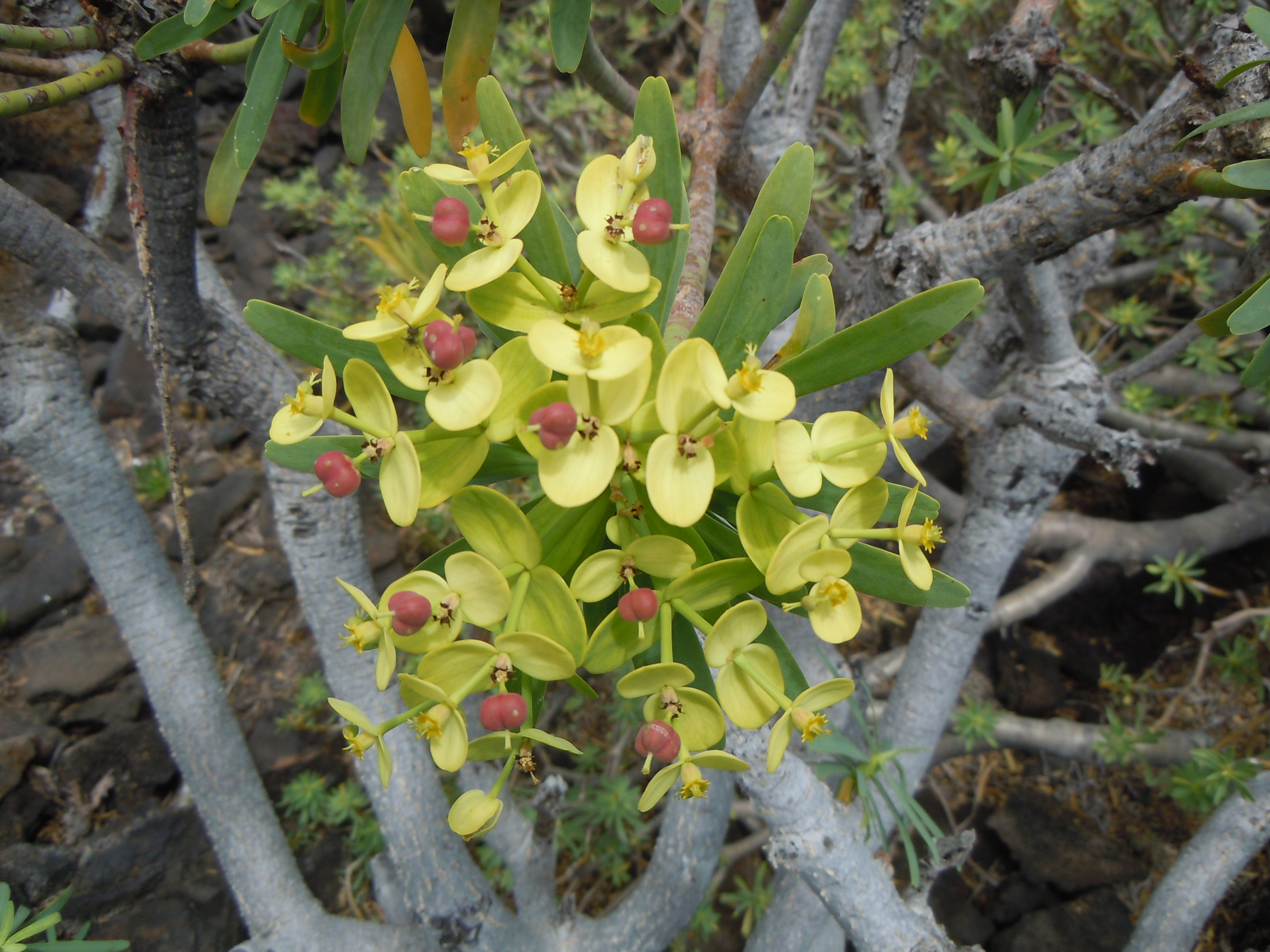
Fruit

== Taxonomy ==
Euphorbia regis-jubae was first described by Jaques Étienne Gay in 1847. The specific epithet regis-jubae, meaning 'King Juba's euphorbia' honours the contributions of Juba II to natural history and his role in bringing the genus to notice.

It has been treated as a subspecies of other Canary Island euphorbias under the names E. obtusifolia subsp. regis-jubae and E. lamarckii subsp. regis-jubae.

E. regis-jubae has regularly been misidentified. The illegitimate name Euphorbia obtusifolia Poir. has been used "indiscriminately" for two species found in the Canary Islands: the eastern E. regis-jubae, and the western E. lamarckii. In 2003, David Bramwell listed seven publications from 1847 to 1993 that gave the wrong names or the wrong distributions for these two species.

== Distribution ==
Euphorbia regis-jubae is native to the eastern Canary Islands – Gran Canaria, Lanzarote and Fuerteventura, western Morocco and north-western Western Sahara. Its distribution differs from that of E. lamarckii, with which it has often been confused; E. lamarckii is found in the western Canary Islands – Tenerife, north-western La Gomera, La Palma and El Hierro.

In Spanish, it is known as tabaiba morisca.
