= David Bramwell (botanist) =

British botanist (1942–2022)

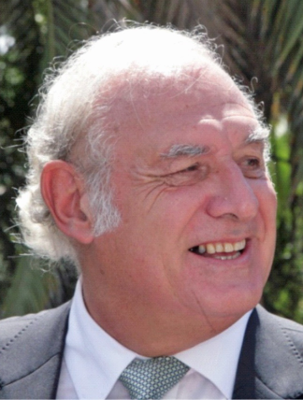
David Bramwell

David Bramwell MBE (25 November 1942 – 20 January 2022) was an English botanist and taxonomist, director of the Jardín Botánico Canario Viera y Clavijo, Gran Canaria (1974–2012), and active in the conservation of insular floras.

== Education ==
Bramwell was born in Ormskirk, near Liverpool, on 25 November 1942. He attended Old Hall Grammar School, Maghull, and studied botany at the University of Liverpool (BSc 1962–1966, MSc 1967), with postgraduate study at the University of Seville (1968–1969). He completed his doctoral thesis on a "Revision of the genus Echium in Macaronesia" at the University of Reading (1969–1971).

== Career ==
In 1971, he joined the staff at the Plant Sciences Department, University of Reading, under Professor Vernon Heywood, teaching plant taxonomy on the MSc course Pure and Applied Plant Taxonomy, and was curator of the Herbarium. He was assistant editor of the Botanical Journal of the Linnean Society and secretary of the International Flora of Macaronesia project. He was elected a Fellow of the Linnean Society in 1971. The first edition of 'Wild Flowers of the Canary Islands' was published in 1974.

He left Reading in 1974 when he was appointed the Director of Jardín Botánico Canario Viera y Clavijo. He retired in 2012 as Director Emeritus. He was Director Plan Especial de Proteccion de Espacios Naturales de Gran Canaria (1984–1986), and Director Botanic Gardens Conservation International (BGCI) (2005–2016), of which he was one of the founders. He was a member of the Royal Society of Arts (FRSA) since 2008. He was appointed Director of the UNESCO Chair for the Conservation of Plant Biodiversity in Macaronesia and West Africa (2011–2014). He published over 100 articles and several books on the Flora of the Canary Islands.

== Personal life and death ==
In 1967, Bramwell married Irene Zoë Taylor (born 1944), a graduate of the University of Liverpool and a botanical illustrator. After the death of his first wife he married Yolanda in 2011. He died on 20 January 2022, at the age of 79.

== Awards ==
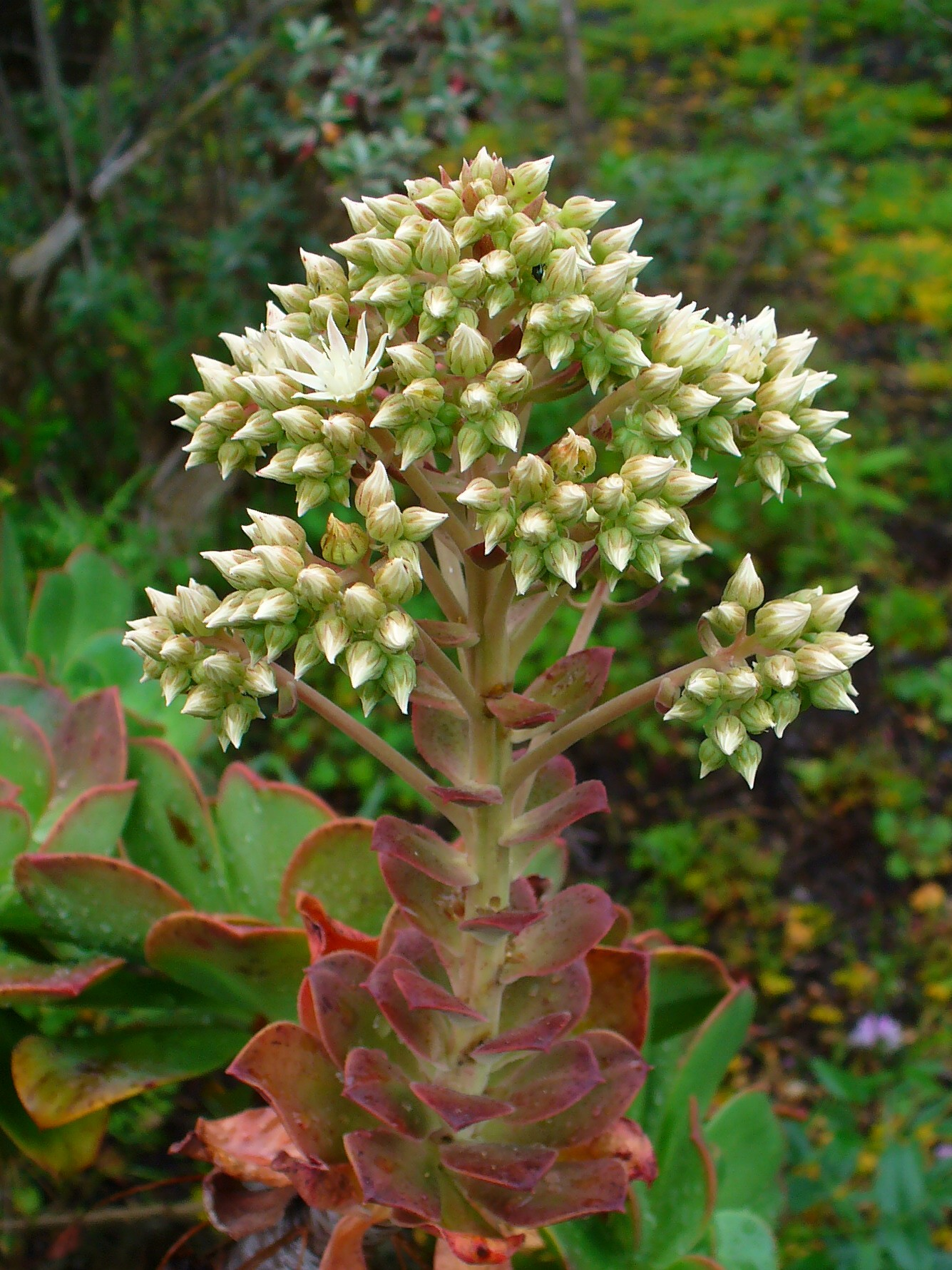
Bramwell's Giant Houseleek

- The Sir Peter Scott Award for Conservation Merit (1984).
- MBE in the 1990 Birthday Honours for services to the British community in Las Palmas, Canary Islands.
- The Cesar Manrique Prize for Environment (1996).
- International Award of Excellence in Conservation from the Botanical Research Institute of Texas (2003).
- Adopted Son of the Island of Gran Canaria (2005).
- Canary Islands Award (2013).
- Henry Shaw Medal (2013) by Missouri Botanical Garden.

== Eponymy ==
Aeonium davidbramwellii H.Y.Liu

== Selected books ==
- Plants and Islands (1979). David Bramwell (Editor). Academic Press Inc. ISBN 978-0-12-125460-5
- Botanic Gardens and the World: Conservation Strategy. (1987). D. Bramwell (Editor). Academic Press Inc. ISBN 978-0-12-125462-9
- Subtropical Gardens (1995). David Bramwell, Zoe Bramwell. Rueda. ISBN 978-8472070868
- Medicinal Plants of the Canary Islands (2004). David Bramwell. Rueda ISBN 978-84-7207-172-8
- Wild Flowers of the Canary Islands (2001, 4th Edition). David Bramwell, Zoe Bramwell. Rueda. ISBN 978-84-7207-128-5
- The Biology of Island Floras (2011). David Bramwell (Editor), Juli Caujapé-Castells (Editor). Cambridge University Press. ISBN 978-0-521-11808-8
