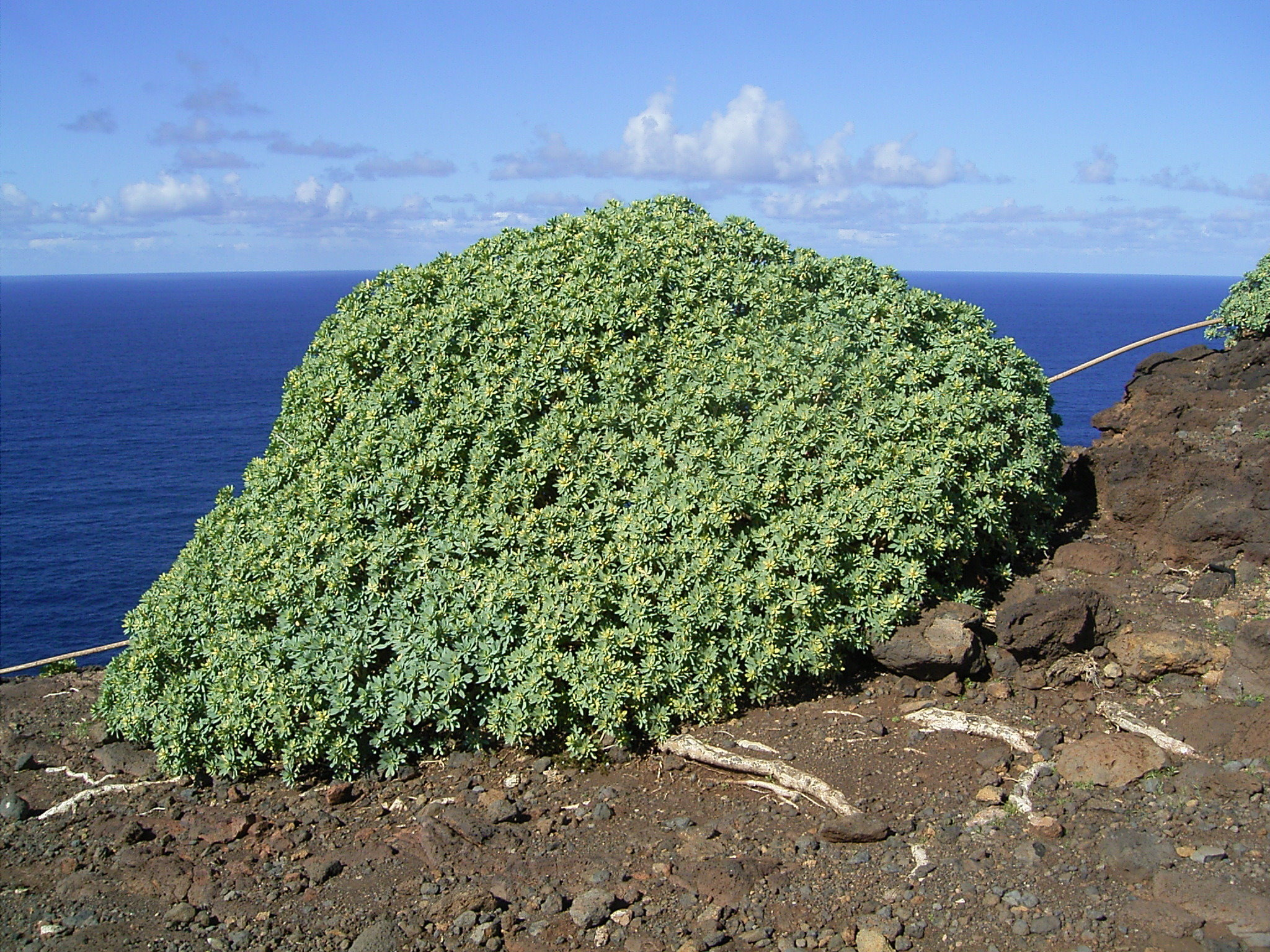
- CITES Appendix II

Scientific classification
- Kingdom: Plantae
- Clade: Embryophytes
- Clade: Tracheophytes
- Clade: Spermatophytes
- Clade: Angiosperms
- Clade: Eudicots
- Clade: Rosids
- Order: Malpighiales
- Family: Euphorbiaceae
- Tribe: Euphorbieae
- Subtribe: Euphorbiinae
- Genus: Euphorbia
- Species: E. balsamifera

Binomial name
- Euphorbia balsamifera Aiton

= Euphorbia balsamifera =

Species of flowering plant in the spurge family

Euphorbia balsamifera (balsam spurge) is a flowering plant in the spurge family Euphorbiaceae. It is distributed in the Canary Islands and the western Sahara. It is the vegetable symbol of the island of Lanzarote. Euphorbia adenensis has been treated as a subspecies of this species.

== Description ==
The plant varies greatly in height. It can be described both as a low shrub or as a small tree from 2 to 5 meters (6.6 to 16.4 ft) tall. The stems are up to 15 cm (5.9 in) in diameter, semisucculent without spines, covered with transverse leaf-scars. The color of the stem varies from gray to terra-cotta. It is branched from the base, the older parts gradually becoming knotty and very thick. The leaves are 80 millimeters long and 4–8 millimeters wide clustered at the tips of the stems. They are green and glaucous, sessile, varying in shape from linear-lanceolate to ovate. The inflorescences are terminal cymes, usually reduced to a single semi-sessile 6 millimeters wide cyathium at the tip of each stem. The color of pseudo-petals is yellowish green. The fruit of the plant is a green large capsule 10 millimeters long and 9 millimeters wide, pinkish-reddish-green when ripened. It is shallowly lobed, smooth or hairy and semi-sessile.

== Subspecies ==
Two subspecies have been distinguished, but Euphoria balsamifera subsp. adenensis is now accepted as a separate species, Euphorbia adenensis.

== Distribution and habitat ==
Euphorbia balsamifera is native to the Canary Islands, western Morocco and Western Sahara.

The tree grows 800 meters (2,600 ft) above sea level in dense communities on rocky grounds and sandy dunes (except for extremely mobile dunes) in plains among other succulent plants.

== Uses ==
Milky latex of Euphorbia balsamifera is poisonous like in other Euphorbia species, but it is not so caustic. In Morocco, it is widely used in dentistry as anesthesia for acute dental pulpitis treatment.

The leaves were gathered and cooked as a green vegetable in the Canary Islands.

As most other succulent members of the genus Euphorbia, its trade is regulated under Appendix II of CITES.

== See also ==
- List of animal and plant symbols of the Canary Islands
- Euphorbia kamerunica, closely related plant in Africa with similar uses
