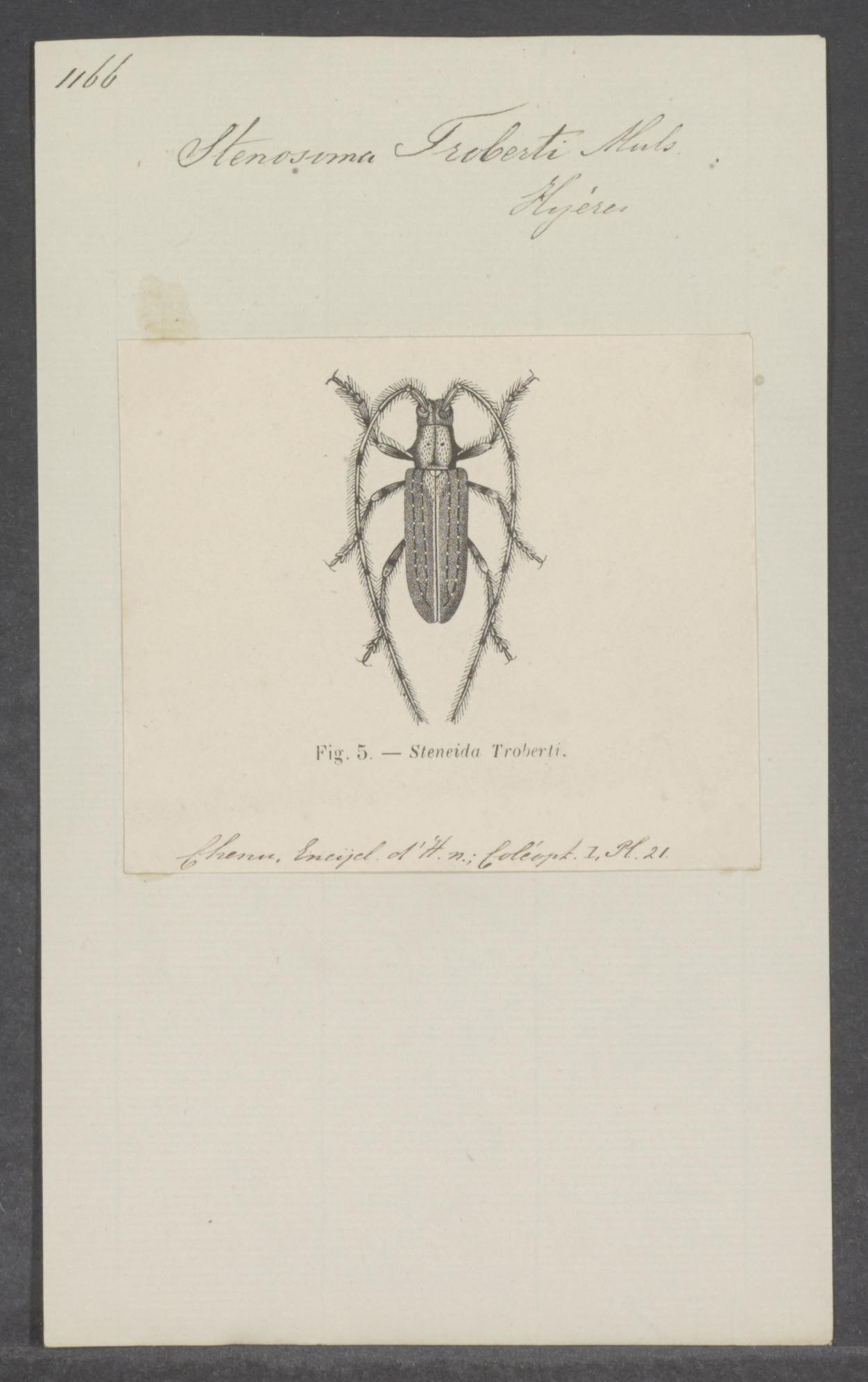
- Stenosoma - Print - Iconographia Zoologica - Special Collections University of Amsterdam

Scientific classification
- Kingdom: Animalia
- Phylum: Arthropoda
- Clade: Pancrustacea
- Class: Insecta
- Order: Coleoptera
- Suborder: Polyphaga
- Infraorder: Cucujiformia
- Family: Cerambycidae
- Genus: Deroplia; Dejean, 1835

Synonyms
- Amblesthis Thomson, 1860

= Deroplia =

Genus of beetles

Deroplia is a genus of beetles belonging to the family Cerambycidae.

The species of this genus are found in Europe and Africa.

== Species ==
Species:

- Deroplia affinis (Fairmaire, 1894)
- Deroplia albida (Brullé, 1839) This nocturnal species is endemic to the Canary Islands.
- Deroplia alutacea (Thomson, 1861)
