= Trifurcula ridiculosa =

Scientific classification
- Kingdom: Animalia
- Phylum: Arthropoda
- Class: Insecta
- Order: Lepidoptera
- Family: Nepticulidae
- Genus: Trifurcula
- Species: T. ridiculosa

Binomial name
- Trifurcula ridiculosa (Walsingham, 1908)

Synonyms
- Stigmella ridiculosa Walsingham, 1908

Species of moth

Trifurcula ridiculosa is a moth of the family Nepticulidae. It is only known from the Canary Islands: Tenerife, La Palma, La Gomera, El Hierro and Madeira, including Porto Santo island.

The wingspan is 4.1–4.5 mm for males and 3.8–4.1 mm for females. It probably breeds continuously. Larvae have been found in February, April, September, October and December.

The larvae feed on Lotus arabicus, Lotus campylocladus, Lotus glaucus, Lotus glinoides, Lotus pedunculatus and Lotus sessilifolius. They mine the leaves of their host plant.
