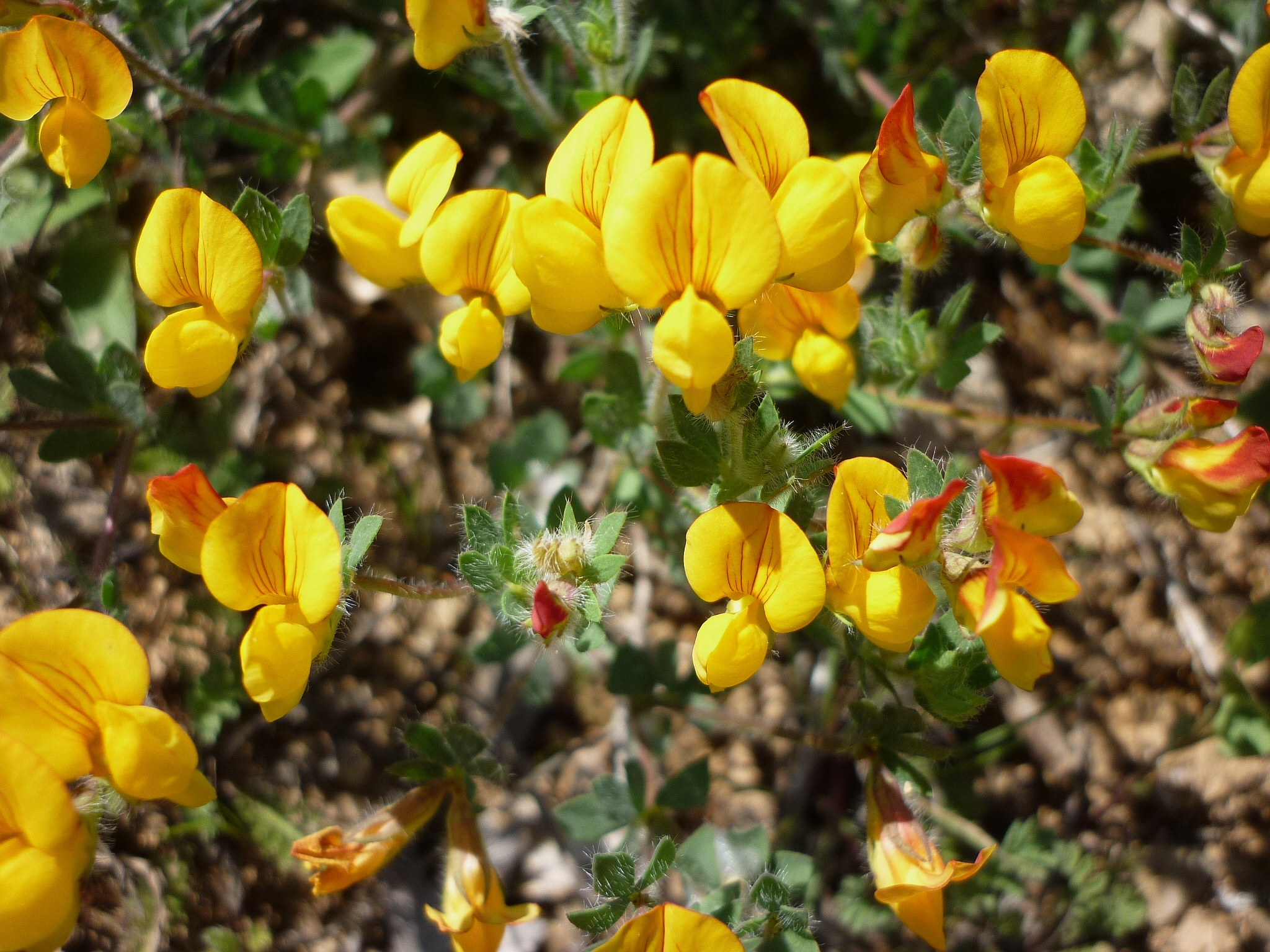
- Bird's-foot trefoil Lotus corniculatus

Scientific classification
- Kingdom: Plantae
- Clade: Embryophytes
- Clade: Tracheophytes
- Clade: Angiosperms
- Clade: Eudicots
- Clade: Rosids
- Order: Fabales
- Family: Fabaceae
- Subfamily: Faboideae
- Clade: Robinioids
- Tribe: Loteae
- Genus: Lotus; L.

Type species
- Lotus corniculatus L.

Species
- Between 70–150; see text

Synonyms
- List: Andaca Raf.; Benedictella Maire; Bonjeanea Rchb.; Dorycnium Mill.; Flundula Raf.; Heinekenia Webb ex Christ; Krokeria Moench; Lotea Medik.; Lotulus Raf.; Miediega Bubani; Mullaghera Bubani; Ortholotus Fourr.; Pedrosia Lowe; Scandalida Adans.; Tetragonolobus Scop.

= Lotus (genus) =

Genus of flowering plants in the bean family

Lotus, a latinization of Greek lōtos (λωτός), is a genus of flowering plants that includes most bird's-foot trefoils (also known as bacon-and-eggs) and deervetches. Depending on the taxonomic authority, roughly between 70 and 150 species are accepted, all legumes; American species formerly placed in the genus have been transferred to other genera. Lotus species are found in the Eastern Hemisphere and adapted to a wide range of habitats.

The aquatic plant commonly known as the Indian or sacred lotus is Nelumbo nucifera, a species not closely related to Lotus.

== Description ==
Most species have leaves with five leaflets; two of these are at the extreme base of the leaf, with the other three at the tip of a naked midrib. This gives the appearance of a pair of large stipules below a "petiole" bearing a trefoil of three leaflets; in fact, the true stipules are minute, soon falling or withering. Some species have pinnate leaves with up to 15 leaflets. The flowers are in clusters of three to ten together at the apex of a stem with some basal leafy bracts; they are pea-flower shaped, usually vivid yellow, but occasionally orange or red. The seeds develop in three or four straight, strongly diverging pods, which together make a shape reminiscent of the diverging toes of a small bird, leading to the common name "bird's-foot".

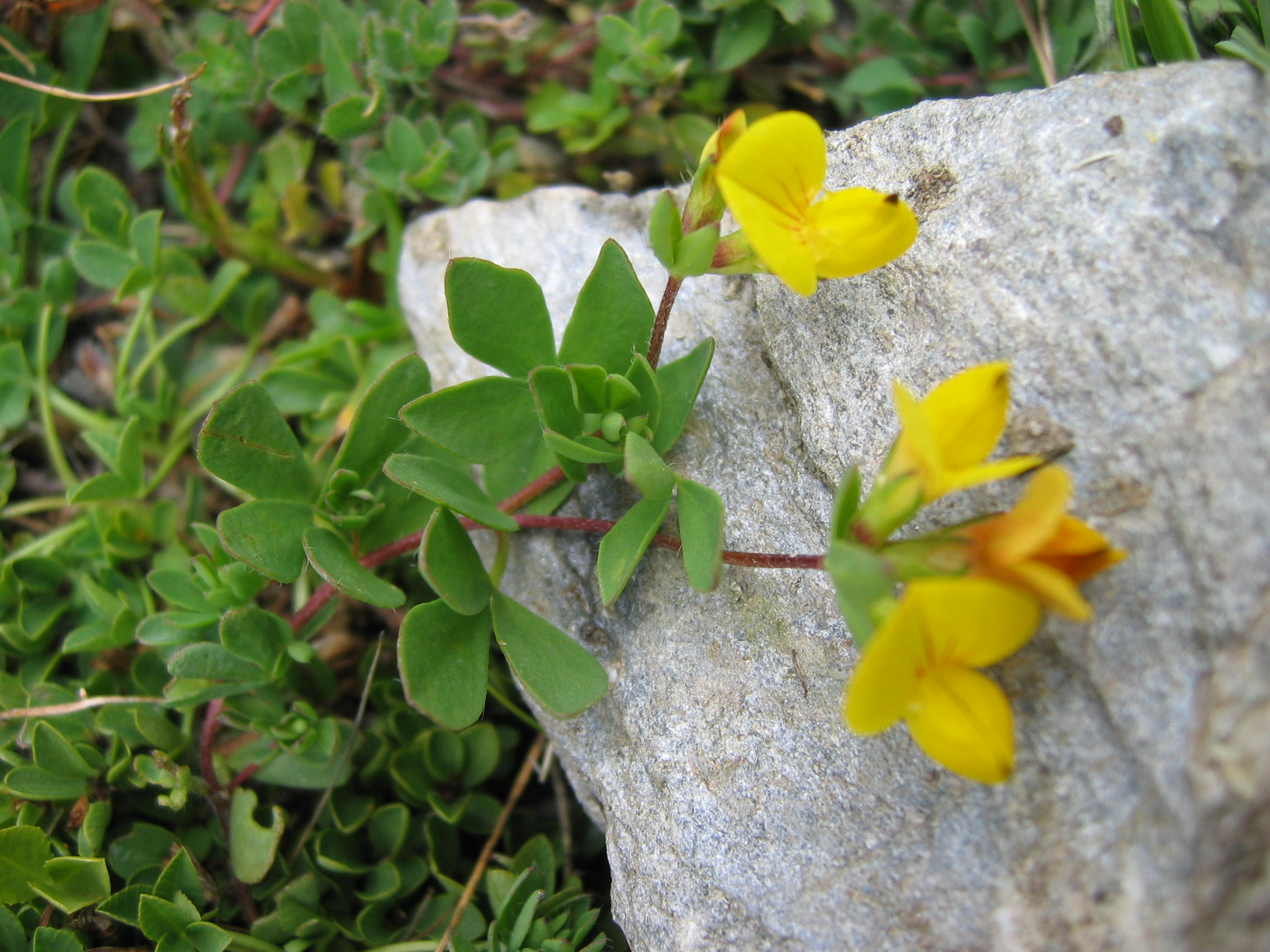
Lotus alpinus

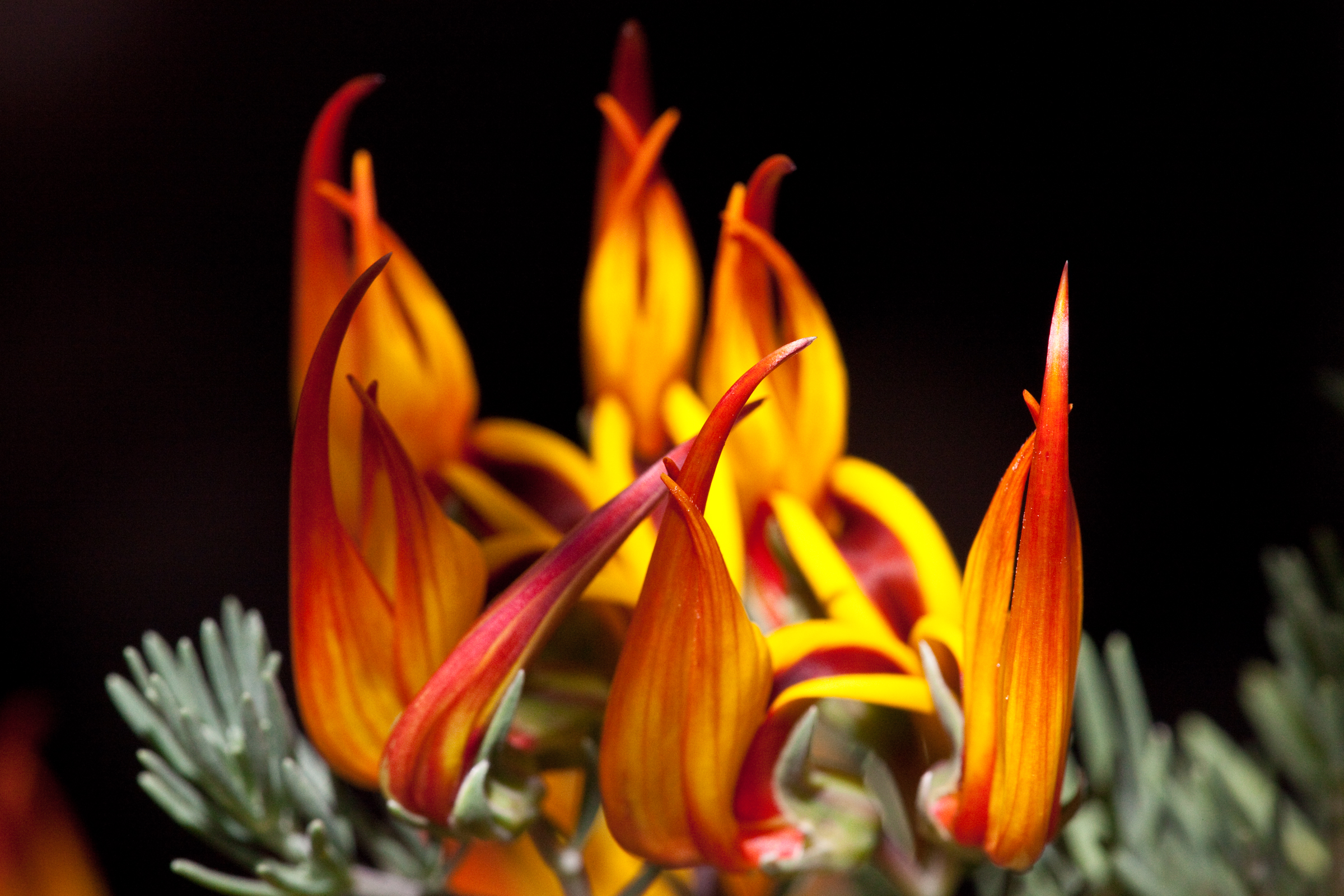
Lotus berthelotii

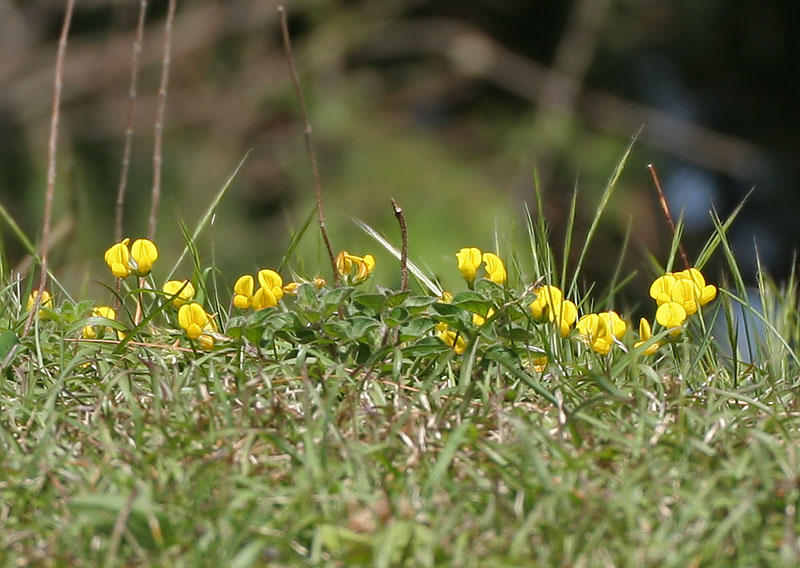
Lotus corniculatus

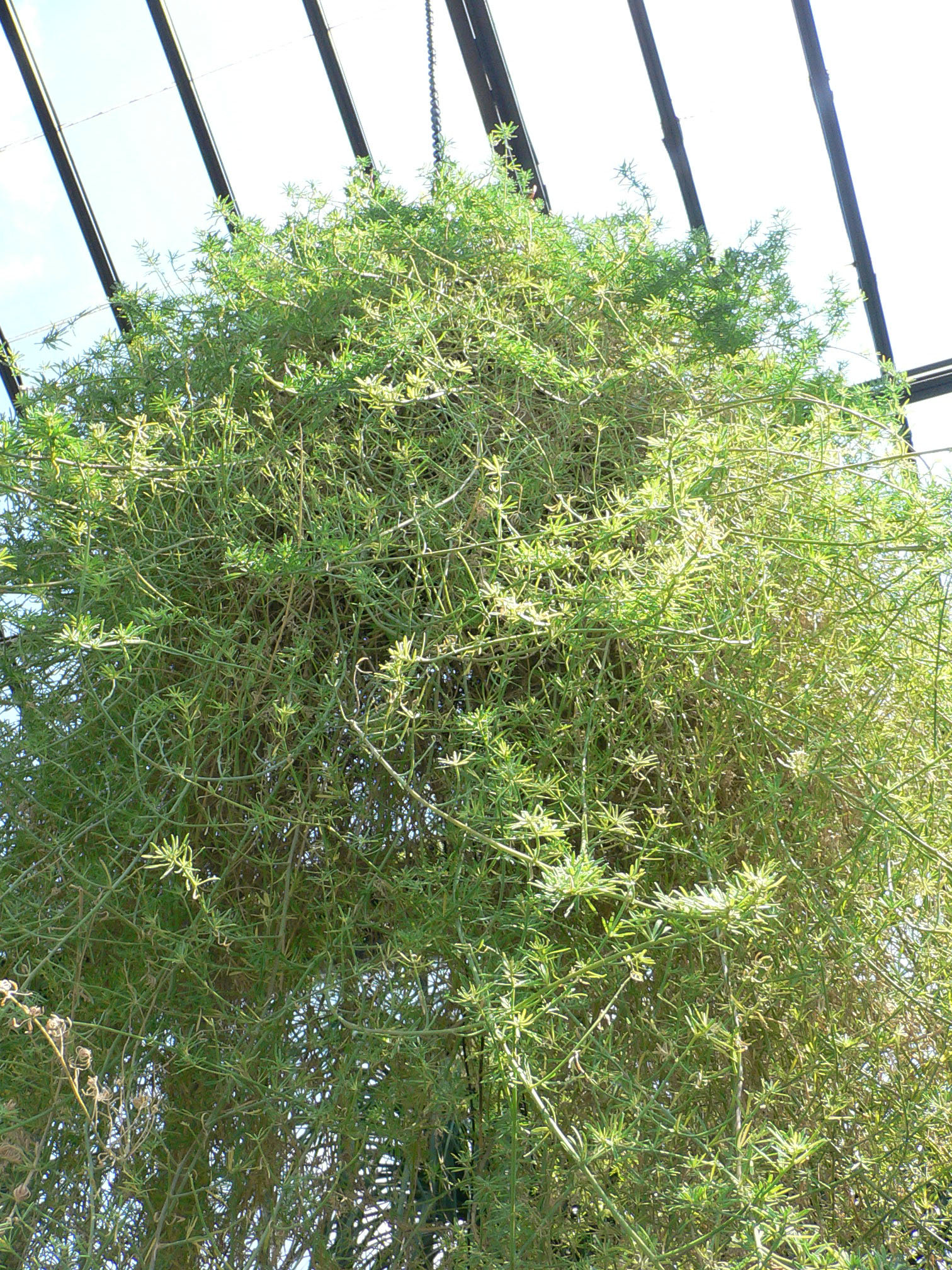
L. maculatus

== Taxonomy ==
The genus Lotus is taxonomically complex. It has at times been divided into subgenera and split into segregate genera, but with no consistent consensus. P.H. Raven in 1971 is said to have been the first to suggest that the "New World" (American) and "Old World" (African and Eurasian) species did not belong in the same genus. A molecular phylogenetic study in 2000 based on nuclear ribosomal ITS sequences confirmed this view. The Western species have been divided between the genera Hosackia s.str., Ottleya, Acmispon and Syrmatium. A 2006 study, primarily concerned with Eastern Lotus species and hence with limited sampling of the American genera, found that they were all monophyletic. The study also supported the view that Dorycnium and Tetragonolobus are not distinct from Lotus at the generic level. More species were added to the 2006 results in 2008, but did not alter the broad conclusions reached before. Clades were identified within Lotus s.str., some of which were significantly different from the sections into which the genus had been divided. However, resolution was incomplete. The results of the analysis were presented in terms of clades and complexes.

=== Species ===
The following species are recognised in the genus Lotus:

- Lotus aduncus (Griseb.) Nyman
- Lotus aegaeus (Griseb.) Boiss.
- Lotus alianus J.H.Kirkbr.
- Lotus alpinus (Ser.) Schleich. ex Ramond – alpine bird's-foot-trefoil
- Lotus anfractuosus (Baker f.) Kramina & D.D.Sokoloff
- Lotus angustissimus L. – slender bird's-foot trefoil
- Lotus arabicus Sol. ex L.
- Lotus arenarius Brot.
- Lotus argyrodes R.P.Murray
- Lotus arinagensis Bramwell
- Lotus assakensis Coss. ex Brand
- Lotus australis Andrews – austral trefoil
- Lotus axilliflorus (Hub.-Mor.) D.D.Sokoloff
- Lotus becquetii Boutique
- Lotus benoistii (Maire) Lassen
- Lotus berthelotii Masf. – Canary Islands trefoil
- Lotus biflorus Desr.
- Lotus borbasii Ujhelyi
- Lotus broussonetii Choisy ex Ser.
- Lotus brunneri Webb
- Lotus burttii Borsos
- Lotus callis-viridis Bramwell & D.H.Davis
- Lotus campylocladus Webb & Berthel.
- Lotus carpetanus Lacaita
- Lotus castellanus Boiss. & Reut.
- Lotus chazaliei H.Boissieu
- Lotus compactus Chrtková
- Lotus conimbricensis Brot.
- Lotus conjugatus L.
- Lotus corniculatus L. – common bird's-foot trefoil, bird's-foot deervetch
- Lotus creticus L.
- Lotus cruentus Court
- Lotus cytisoides L.
- Lotus × davyae Druce
- Lotus discolor E.Mey.
- Lotus divaricatus Boiss.
- Lotus dorycnium L.
- Lotus drepanocarpus Durieu
- Lotus dumetorum Webb ex R.P.Murray
- Lotus edulis L.
- Lotus emeroides R.P.Murray
- Lotus eremiticus A.Santos
- Lotus eriophthalmus Webb & Berthel.
- Lotus frondosus (Freyn) Kuprian.
- Lotus fulgurans (Porta) D.D.Sokoloff
- Lotus garcinii Ser.
- Lotus gebelia Vent.
- Lotus germanicus (Gremli) Peruzzi
- Lotus glacialis (Boiss.) Pau
- Lotus glareosus Boiss. & Reut.
- Lotus glaucus Aiton
- Lotus glinoides Delile
- Lotus goetzei Harms
- Lotus gomerythus A.Portero, J.Martín-Carbajal & R.Mesa
- Lotus graecus L.
- Lotus halophilus Boiss. & Spruner
- Lotus hebecarpus J.B.Gillett
- Lotus hebranicus Hochst. ex Brand
- Lotus herbaceus (Vill.) Jauzein
- Lotus hirsutus L.
- Lotus holosericeus Webb & Berthel.
- Lotus jacobaeus L.
- Lotus japonicus (Regel) K.Larsen
- Lotus jolyi Batt.
- Lotus jordanii (Loret & Barrandon) Coulot, Rabaute & J.-M.Tison
- Lotus krylovii Schischk. & Serg.
- Lotus kunkelii (Esteve) Bramwell & D.H.Davis
- Lotus lalambensis Schweinf.
- Lotus lancerottensis Webb & Berthel.
- Lotus lanuginosus Vent.
- Lotus laricus Rech.f., Aellen & Esfand.
- Lotus latidentatus Elenevsky
- Lotus lebrunii Boutique
- Lotus longisiliquosus R.Roem.
- Lotus lourdes-santiagoi Pina & Valdés
- Lotus loweanus Webb & Berthel.
- Lotus macranthus Lowe
- Lotus maculatus Breitf.
- Lotus maritimus L.
- Lotus maroccanus Ball
- Lotus mascaensis Burchard
- Lotus × medioximus Husn.
- Lotus michauxianus Ser.
- Lotus × minoricensis M.À.Conesa, Mus & Rosselló
- Lotus miyakojimae Kramina
- Lotus mlanjeanus J.B.Gillett
- Lotus mollis Balf.f.
- Lotus namulensis Brand
- Lotus nubicus Hochst. ex Baker
- Lotus oliveirae A.Chev.
- Lotus ononopsis Balf.f.
- Lotus ornithopodioides L.
- Lotus palustris Willd.
- Lotus parviflorus Desf. – smallflower bird's-foot trefoil, smallflower trefoil
- Lotus peczoricus Miniaev & Ulle
- Lotus pedunculatus Cav. – greater bird's-foot trefoil, marsh bird's-foot trefoil, large bird's-foot trefoil, big trefoil
- Lotus peregrinus L.
- Lotus polyphyllos E.D.Clarke
- Lotus pseudocreticus Maire, Weiller & Wilczek
- Lotus purpureus Webb
- Lotus pyranthus P.Pérez
- Lotus quinatus (Forssk.) J.B.Gillett
- Lotus rechingeri Chrtková
- Lotus rectus L.
- Lotus requienii Mauri ex Sanguin.
- Lotus robsonii E.S.Martins & D.D.Sokoloff
- Lotus sanguineus (Vural) D.D.Sokoloff
- Lotus schoelleri Schweinf.
- Lotus sessilifolius DC.
- Lotus simoneae Maire, Weiller & Wilczek
- Lotus spartioides Webb & Berthel.
- Lotus spectabilis Choisy ex Ser.
- Lotus stepposus Kramina
- Lotus strictus Fisch. & C.A.Mey.
- Lotus subbiflorus Lag. – hairy bird's-foot trefoil
- Lotus subdigitatus Boutique
- Lotus taitungensis S.S.Ying
- Lotus tenellus (Lowe) Sandral, A.Santos & D.D.Sokoloff (including Lotus leptophyllus (Lowe) K.Larsen)
- Lotus tenuis Waldst. & Kit. ex Willd. – narrowleaf trefoil, slender trefoil, creeping trefoil, or prostrate trefoil
- Lotus tetragonolobus L.
- Lotus tetraphyllus L.
- Lotus tibesticus Maire
- Lotus torulosus (Chiov.) Fiori
- Lotus × ucrainicus Klokov
- Lotus villicarpus Andr.
- Lotus weilleri Maire
- Lotus wildii J.B.Gillett
- Lotus zemmouriensis C.Chatel., F.Andrieu & Dobignard

=== Species placed elsewhere ===
- Lotus aboriginus = Hosackia rosea
- Lotus argophyllus = Acmispon argophyllus
- Lotus argyraeus = Acmispon argyraeus
- Lotus benthamii = Acmispon cytisoides
- Lotus crassifolius = Hosackia crassifolia
- Lotus dendroideus = Acmispon dendroideus
- Lotus denticulatus = Acmispon denticulatus
- Lotus grandiflorus = Acmispon grandiflorus
- Lotus hamatus = Acmispon micranthus
- Lotus haydonii = Acmispon haydonii
- Lotus heermannii = Acmispon tomentosus var. glabriusculus
- Lotus humistratus = Acmispon brachycarpus
- Lotus incanus = Hosackia incana
- Lotus junceus = Acmispon junceus
- Lotus mearnsii = Acmispon mearnsii
- Lotus micranthus = Acmispon parviflorus
- Lotus nevadensis = Acmispon decumbens
- Lotus nuttallianus = Acmispon prostratus
- Lotus oblongifolius = Hosackia oblongifolia
- Lotus pinnatus = Hosackia pinnata
- Lotus procumbens = Acmispon procumbens
- Lotus rubriflorus = Acmispon rubriflorus
- Lotus salsuginosus = Acmispon maritimus
- Lotus stipularis = Hosackia stipularis
- Lotus wrightii = Ottleya wrightii

== Distribution and habitat ==
The genus contains many dozens of species distributed in the Eastern Hemisphere, including Africa, Europe, western, southern, and eastern Asia, and Australia and New Guinea. They are adapted to a wide range of habitats, from coastal environments to high elevations.

== Ecology ==
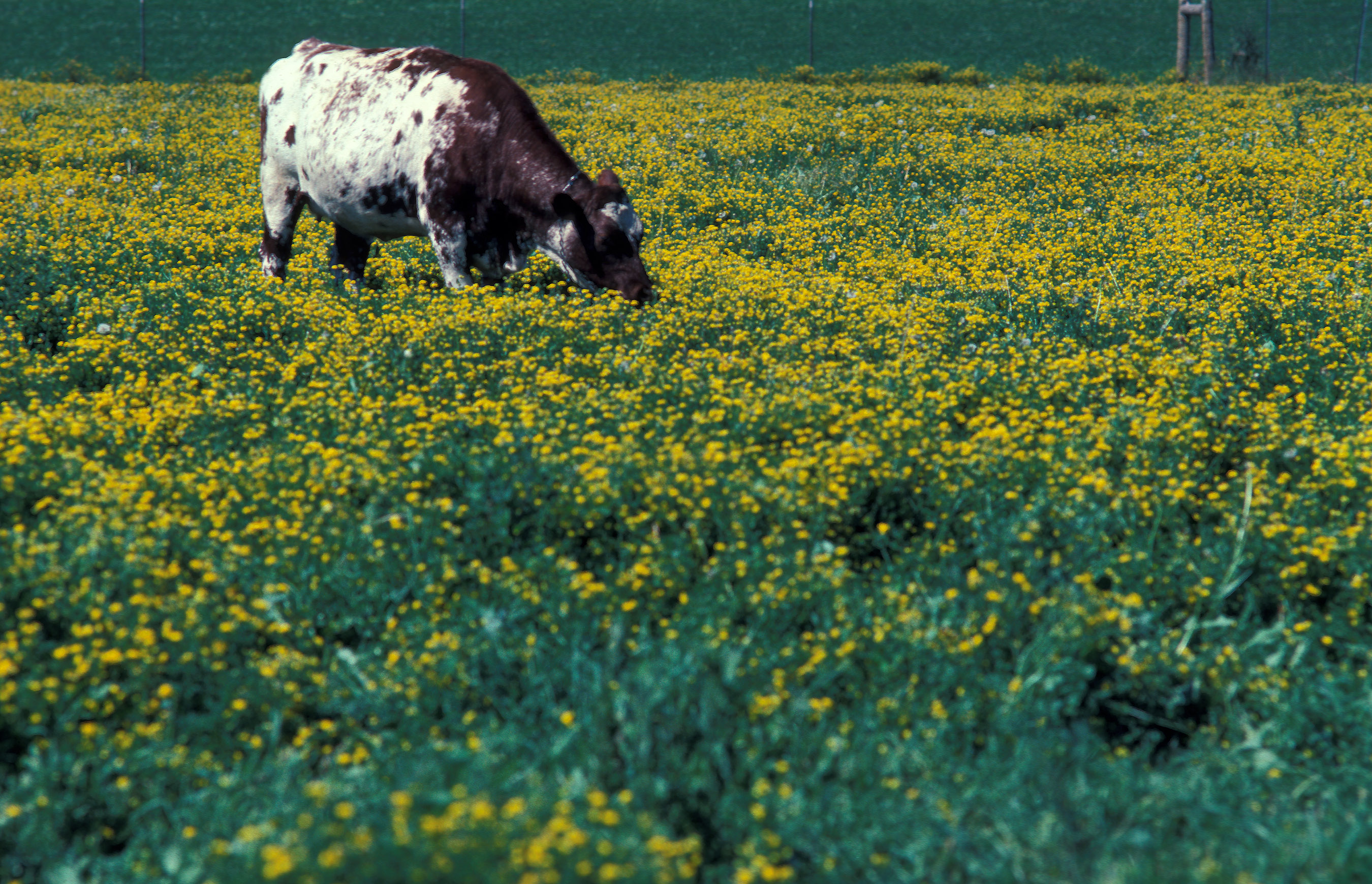
Pasture with Lotus corniculatus (common bird's-foot trefoil, birds-foot deervetch)

Lotus species are used as food plants by the larvae of some Lepidoptera species.

L. corniculatus is an invasive species in some regions of North America and Australia.

== Uses ==
Several species are cultivated for forage, including L. corniculatus, L. glaber, and L. pedunculatus. They can produce toxic cyanogenic glycosides which can be potentially toxic to livestock, but also produce tannins, which are a beneficial anti-bloating compound.

Species in this genus can fix nitrogen from the air courtesy of their root nodules, making them useful as a cover crop. The nodulating symbionts are Bradyrhizobium and Mesorhizobium bacteria. Scientific research for crop improvement and understanding the general biology of the genus is focused on L. japonicus, which is currently the subject of a full genome sequencing project, and is considered a model organism.

Some species, such as L. berthelotii from the Canary Islands, are grown as ornamental plants.
