= Lotus conimbricensis =

Scientific classification
- Kingdom: Plantae
- Clade: Tracheophytes
- Clade: Angiosperms
- Clade: Eudicots
- Clade: Rosids
- Order: Fabales
- Family: Fabaceae
- Subfamily: Faboideae
- Genus: Lotus
- Species: L. conimbricensis

Binomial name
- Lotus conimbricensis Brot.

Species of plant

Lotus conimbricensis has a trailing plant in the genus Lotus.

this species is also known in Arabic as לוֹטוּס רִיסָנִי.

== Appearance ==
Lotus conimbricensis is identified by its singular white flower pea shaped flowers looking much like Lotus micranthus except with purple veining. This species also has hairs on the bottom and a smooth top of the small oval leaves which is a key identification feature.

== Recognition ==
This species is recognized under the USDA PLANTS database.

== Status ==
This plant is considered least concern.
