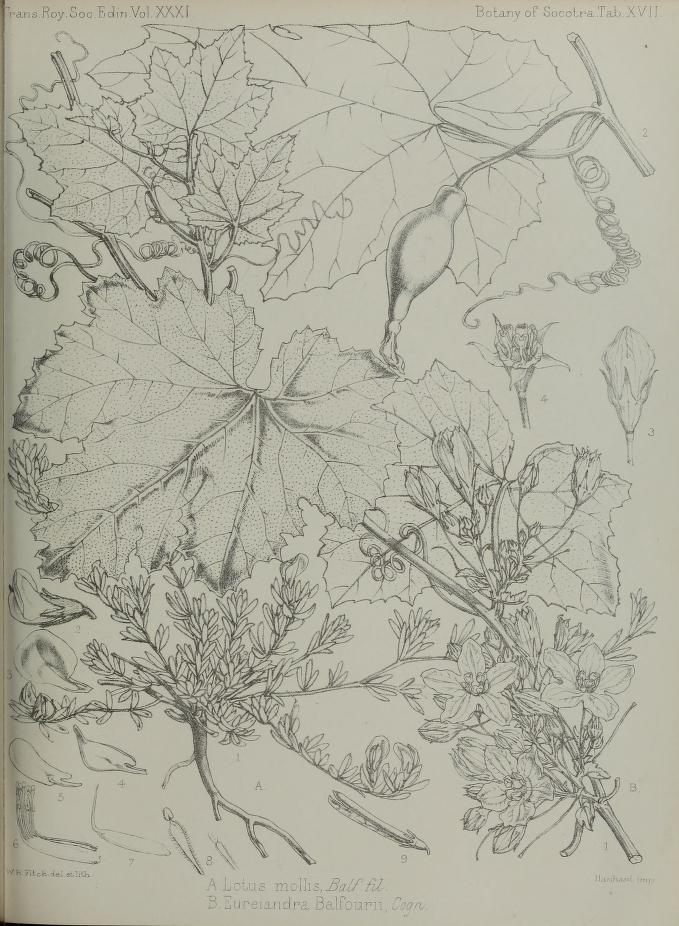

Conservation status
- Vulnerable (IUCN 3.1)

Scientific classification
- Kingdom: Plantae
- Clade: Tracheophytes
- Clade: Angiosperms
- Clade: Eudicots
- Clade: Rosids
- Order: Fabales
- Family: Fabaceae
- Subfamily: Faboideae
- Genus: Lotus
- Species: L. mollis

Binomial name
- Lotus mollis Balf.f.

= Lotus mollis =

Species of plant

Lotus mollis is a species of legume in the family Fabaceae. It is native to the islands of Socotra and Samhah in the Socotra Archipelago of Yemen. Its natural habitat is rocky areas.
