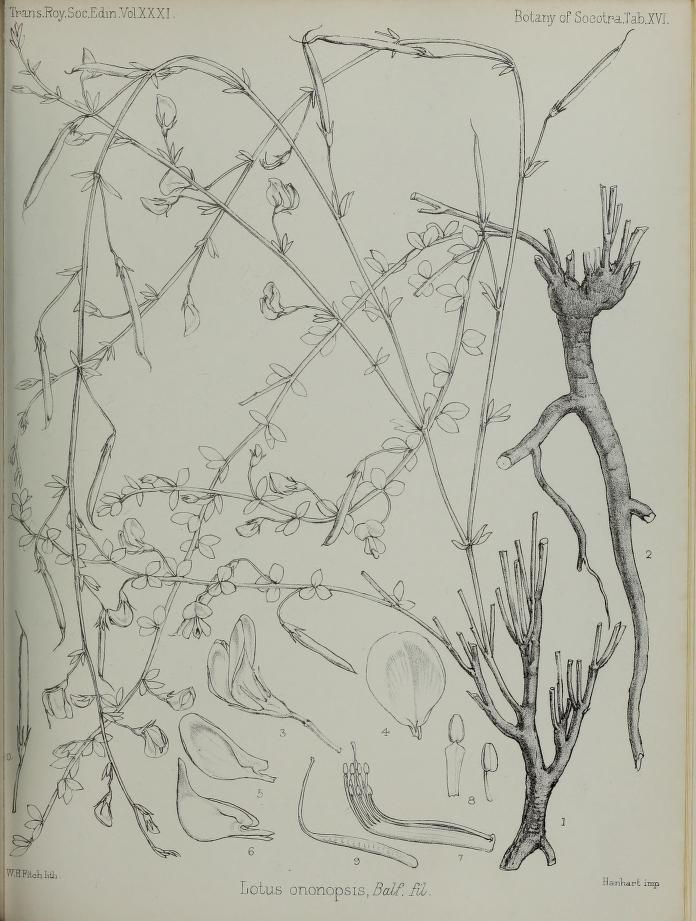

Conservation status
- Least Concern (IUCN 3.1)

Scientific classification
- Kingdom: Plantae
- Clade: Tracheophytes
- Clade: Angiosperms
- Clade: Eudicots
- Clade: Rosids
- Order: Fabales
- Family: Fabaceae
- Subfamily: Faboideae
- Genus: Lotus
- Species: L. ononopsis

Binomial name
- Lotus ononopsis Balf.f.

= Lotus ononopsis =

Species of plant

Lotus ononopsis is a species of legume in the family Fabaceae. It is endemic to north-central and northeastern Socotra in Yemen. Its natural habitats are subtropical or tropical dry forests and subtropical or tropical dry lowland grassland.
