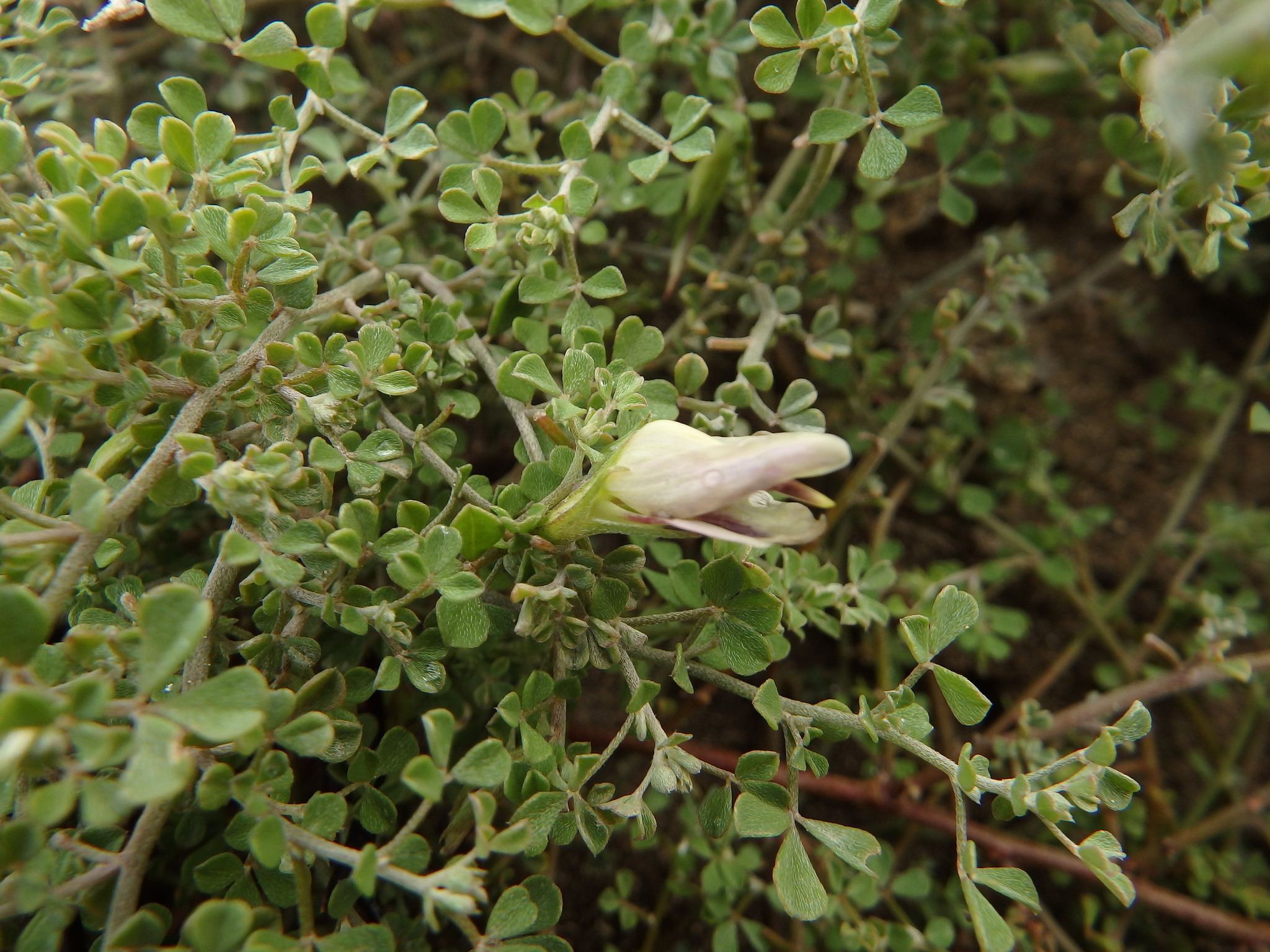

Scientific classification
- Kingdom: Plantae
- Clade: Tracheophytes
- Clade: Angiosperms
- Clade: Eudicots
- Clade: Rosids
- Order: Fabales
- Family: Fabaceae
- Subfamily: Faboideae
- Genus: Lotus
- Species: L. macranthus

Binomial name
- Lotus macranthus Lowe

Synonyms
- Pedrosia macrantha (Lowe) Lowe (1856)

= Lotus macranthus =

Plant species in the family

Lotus macranthus is a species that grows in the Madeira archipelago.

== Description ==
Lotus macranthus has a taproot that zigzags as it grows into the ground. Its roots are whiteish in color, soft, brittle, juicy.

== Taxonomy ==
Lotus macranthus was first scientifically described by Richard Thomas Lowe in 1838. He later described it as Pedrosia macrantha in 1856, a genus that is now synonymized with Lotus.

== Range and habitat ==
Its native range is in the Madeira archipelago.
