= Lotus goetzei =

Scientific classification
- Kingdom: Plantae
- Clade: Tracheophytes
- Clade: Angiosperms
- Clade: Eudicots
- Clade: Rosids
- Order: Fabales
- Family: Fabaceae
- Subfamily: Faboideae
- Genus: Lotus
- Species: L. goetzei

Binomial name
- Lotus goetzei Harms

Species of plant

Lotus goetzei is a plant in the genus Lotus ranging from Ethiopia to S.southern Tropical Africa.

== Description ==
This species is characterized by small light pink, magenta striped vetch-like flowers puffed at the bottom and pea like three to four lobed leaves with sharp ends.

== Conservation status ==
This species is classified as not threatened by the Kew database.
