= Lotus frondosus =

Scientific classification
- Kingdom: Plantae
- Clade: Tracheophytes
- Clade: Angiosperms
- Clade: Eudicots
- Clade: Rosids
- Order: Fabales
- Family: Fabaceae
- Subfamily: Faboideae
- Genus: Lotus
- Species: L. frondosus

Binomial name
- Lotus frondosus (Freyn) Kuprian.

Species of plant

Lotus frondosus is a perennial plant from the Lotus genus ranging from E. Ukraine to Caucasus and Mongolia.

== Description ==
This species has narrow leaves at the bottom, gradually becoming a bit less narrow as they come up. they go into clusters of three. The flowers are pea-like in clusters of 3. They are yellow.

== Taxonomy ==
This species is considered a subspecies by the name Lotus corniculatus subsp. frondosus by the USDA database. The Kew database considers the subspecies a synonym for Lotus frondosus.
