= Lotus graecus =

Scientific classification
- Kingdom: Plantae
- Clade: Tracheophytes
- Clade: Angiosperms
- Clade: Eudicots
- Clade: Rosids
- Order: Fabales
- Family: Fabaceae
- Subfamily: Faboideae
- Genus: Lotus
- Species: L. graecus

Binomial name
- Lotus graecus L.

Species of plant

Lotus graecus is a subshrub in the genus Lotus native from SE Europe to the Caucasus.

== Description ==
This plant is identified for its unique pompom balls of white pealike flowers. Its leaves are classic five lobed Lotus leaves. The leaves are heavily hairy at the bottoms. The reddish seedheads are equally as unique looking like clusters of little melons where the flowers used to be.

== Conservation status ==
This species is Least Concern.
