= Lotus krylovii =

Scientific classification
- Kingdom: Plantae
- Clade: Tracheophytes
- Clade: Angiosperms
- Clade: Eudicots
- Clade: Rosids
- Order: Fabales
- Family: Fabaceae
- Subfamily: Faboideae
- Genus: Lotus
- Species: L. krylovii

Binomial name
- Lotus krylovii Schischk. & Serg.

Species of plant

Lotus krylovii is a plant in the genus Lotus ranging from SE Ukraine to Mongolia and Pakistan.

== Description ==
This species is recognized by small yellow pea-like puffed flowers, younger flowers are sometimes reddish. It is trailing and the leaves are like that of a normal herbancious lotus without many hairs.

== Distribution ==
This species has also been introduced to Canada and Russia.
