= Lotus eremiticus =

Scientific classification
- Kingdom: Plantae
- Clade: Tracheophytes
- Clade: Angiosperms
- Clade: Eudicots
- Clade: Rosids
- Order: Fabales
- Family: Fabaceae
- Subfamily: Faboideae
- Genus: Lotus
- Species: L. eremiticus

Binomial name
- Lotus eremiticus A.Santos

Species of plant

Lotus eremiticus or the Hermit Lotus Vine is a species of plant in the genus Lotus native to the Canary Islands (La Palma).

== Description ==
This species is superficially identical to four other species, but is only one of two native to La Palma.

This species essentially has shorter leaves than the other species (shown in source 2), and lighter flowers.
