= Lotus eriophthalmus =

Scientific classification
- Kingdom: Plantae
- Clade: Tracheophytes
- Clade: Angiosperms
- Clade: Eudicots
- Clade: Rosids
- Order: Fabales
- Family: Fabaceae
- Subfamily: Faboideae
- Genus: Lotus
- Species: L. eriophthalmus

Binomial name
- Lotus eriophthalmus Webb & Berthel.

Species of plant

Lotus eriophthalmus is a plant in the genus Lotus endemic to the Canary Islands.

== Description ==
This species is a trailing perennial subshrub, with three lobed leaves and a leaflet at the base of each leaf stem.

== Conservation status ==
This species is considered Threatened by the Kew plant database.
