= Lotus compactus =

Scientific classification
- Kingdom: Plantae
- Clade: Tracheophytes
- Clade: Angiosperms
- Clade: Eudicots
- Clade: Rosids
- Order: Fabales
- Family: Fabaceae
- Subfamily: Faboideae
- Genus: Lotus
- Species: L. compactus

Binomial name
- Lotus compactus Chrtková

Species of plant

Lotus compactus is a plant in the genus Lotus endemic to Pakistan.

== Conservation status ==
This species classified as threatened by Kew.
