= Lotus broussonetii =

Scientific classification
- Kingdom: Plantae
- Clade: Tracheophytes
- Clade: Angiosperms
- Clade: Eudicots
- Clade: Rosids
- Order: Fabales
- Family: Fabaceae
- Subfamily: Faboideae
- Genus: Lotus
- Species: L. broussonetii

Binomial name
- Lotus broussonetii Choisy ex Ser.

Species of plant

Lotus broussonetii is a plant in the Lotus genus endemic to the Canary Islands, where it is native to the islands of Gran Canaria and Tenerife.

== Description ==
This species is identified by its being a leafy shrub, with leaves three lobed and about an inch across each. The flowers are heavily clustered and white. This plant is also a standing shrub.

== Conservation status ==
This species is considered Threatened by the Kew database.
