= Lotus axilliflorus =

Scientific classification
- Kingdom: Plantae
- Clade: Embryophytes
- Clade: Tracheophytes
- Clade: Angiosperms
- Clade: Eudicots
- Clade: Rosids
- Order: Fabales
- Family: Fabaceae
- Subfamily: Faboideae
- Genus: Lotus
- Species: L. axilliflorus

Binomial name
- Lotus axilliflorus (Hub.-Mor.) D.D.Sokoloff

Species of plant native to Turkey

Lotus axilliflorus is a perennial plant in the genus Lotus, native to Turkey.

== Conservation status ==
This species is threatened according the Kew database.
