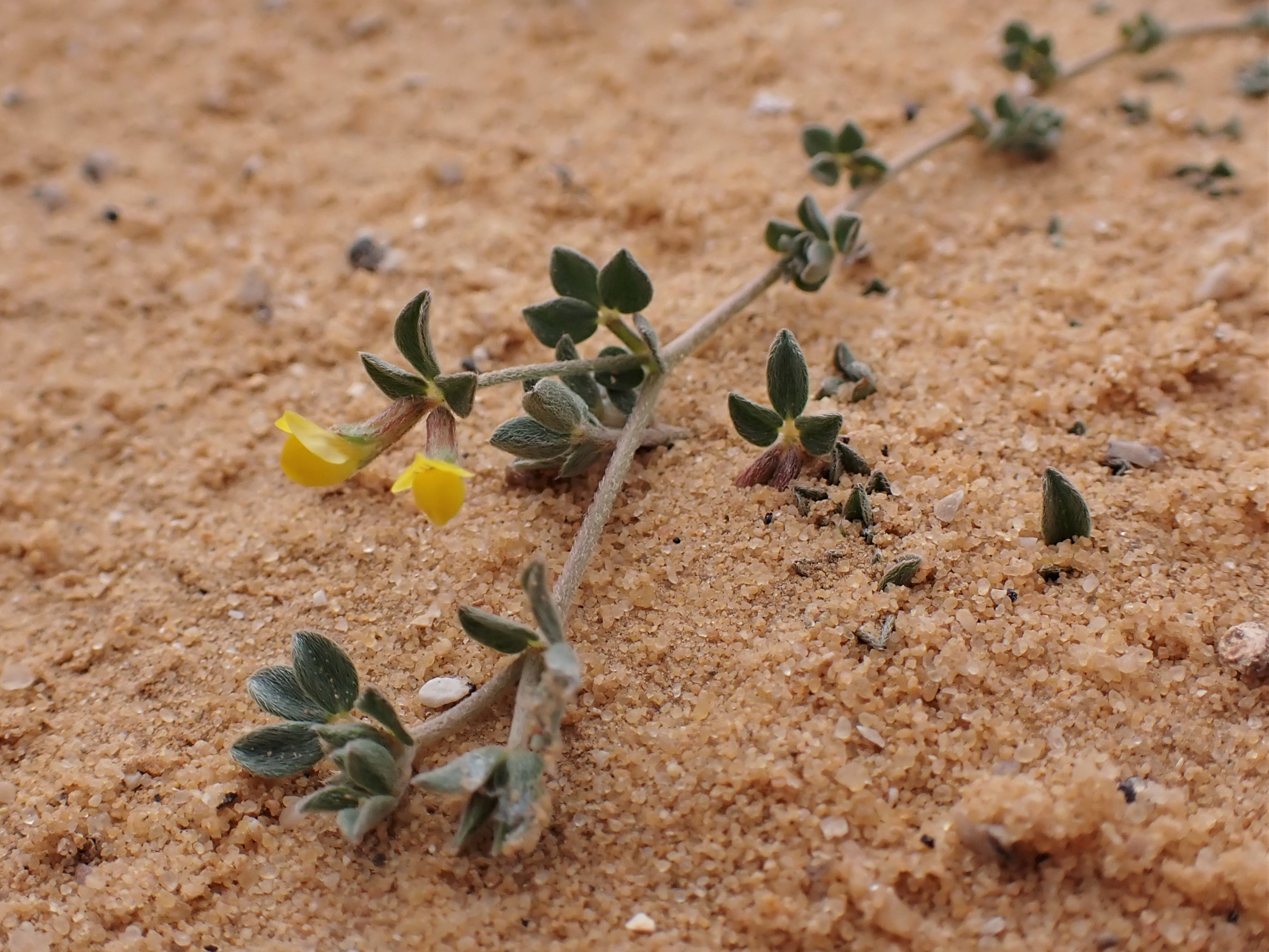

Scientific classification
- Kingdom: Plantae
- Clade: Embryophytes
- Clade: Tracheophytes
- Clade: Spermatophytes
- Clade: Angiosperms
- Clade: Eudicots
- Clade: Rosids
- Order: Fabales
- Family: Fabaceae
- Subfamily: Faboideae
- Genus: Lotus
- Species: L. halophilus

Binomial name
- Lotus halophilus Boiss. & Spruner

Synonyms
- Lotus pusillus

= Lotus halophilus =

Species of plant

Lotus halophilus is a species of annual herb in the family Fabaceae. It is native to western Asia, North Africa, Greece and Sicily. They have a self-supporting growth form and compound, broad leaves.

== Sources ==
This article incorporates text from a free content work. Licensed under CC0 (license statement/permission). Text taken from Lotus halophilus. Encyclopedia of Life.
