= Lotus emeroides =

Scientific classification
- Kingdom: Plantae
- Clade: Tracheophytes
- Clade: Angiosperms
- Clade: Eudicots
- Clade: Rosids
- Order: Fabales
- Family: Fabaceae
- Subfamily: Faboideae
- Genus: Lotus
- Species: L. emeroides

Binomial name
- Lotus emeroides R.P.Murray

Synonyms
- Lotus borzii Pit.

Species of plant

Lotus emeroides is a species of plant in the Lotus genus endemic to the Canary Islands (La Gomera).

== Description ==
This plant is a leguminous leaved trailing plant, with lightly haired leaves, and one to three pea-like flowers per head.

== Conservation status ==
This species is classified as threatened by the Kew database.
