= Lotus argyrodes =

Scientific classification
- Kingdom: Plantae
- Clade: Tracheophytes
- Clade: Angiosperms
- Clade: Eudicots
- Clade: Rosids
- Order: Fabales
- Family: Fabaceae
- Subfamily: Faboideae
- Genus: Lotus
- Species: L. argyrodes

Binomial name
- Lotus argyrodes R.P.Murray

Species of plant

Lotus argyrodes is a plant species in the genus Lotus endemic to the Azores and Madeira Islands.

== Description ==
This species is a subshrub with succulent leaves each with fine hairs. The flowers have a red wing and a yellow beak, looking swanlike, along with a preseadhead flower part. the leaves are oval when mature.

This species also has green hairless seed pods that stick upright off the old leaves.

== Conservation status ==
This species is actually considered Least Concern by the Kew database.
