= Lotus burttii =

Scientific classification
- Kingdom: Plantae
- Clade: Tracheophytes
- Clade: Angiosperms
- Clade: Eudicots
- Clade: Rosids
- Order: Fabales
- Family: Fabaceae
- Subfamily: Faboideae
- Genus: Lotus
- Species: L. burttii

Binomial name
- Lotus burttii Borsos

Species of Lotus

Lotus burttii is an annual plant in the genus Lotus ranging from Central Asia to Pakistan.

== Description ==
This species is identified by its small reddish pink flowers, and small, hairless, pointed radiating leaves.

== Conservation status ==
This species is considered Least Concern by the Kew database.
