= Lotus gomerythus =

Scientific classification
- Kingdom: Plantae
- Clade: Tracheophytes
- Clade: Angiosperms
- Clade: Eudicots
- Clade: Rosids
- Order: Fabales
- Family: Fabaceae
- Subfamily: Faboideae
- Genus: Lotus
- Species: L. gomerythus

Binomial name
- Lotus gomerythus A.Portero, J.Martín-Carbajal & R.Mesa

Species of flowering plant

Lotus gomerythus or the La Gomera beak. is a plant in the genus Lotus.

Lotus gomerythus is endemic to the Canary Islands.

== Description ==
Lotus gomerythus is identified by its semi succulent leaves looking much like that of a plant in the family Aizoaceae. the big differentiator is that the leaves have a whitish base, are clustered near the top, and have microscopic hairs on the bases and tops. The flowers of Lotus gomerythus are dark orange and are best described as pelican beak shaped.

== Conservation status ==
Lotus gomerythus is classified as threatened by the Kew database.
