= Lotus benoistii =

Conservation status
- Critically Endangered (IUCN 3.1)

Scientific classification
- Kingdom: Plantae
- Clade: Tracheophytes
- Clade: Angiosperms
- Clade: Eudicots
- Clade: Rosids
- Order: Fabales
- Family: Fabaceae
- Subfamily: Faboideae
- Genus: Lotus
- Species: L. benoistii

Binomial name
- Lotus benoistii (Maire) Lassen

Synonyms
- Benedictella benoistii Maire

Species of plant

Lotus benoistii is a plant in the genus Lotus endemic to Morocco.

== Description ==
This species is identified by its beak like dark to light green seedheads. This species has five lobes per leaf, and spreads on a trailing stem. The flowers are small and yellow, with red tips looking like finch beaks.

== Conservation status ==
This species is considered Critically Endangered by the Red List.
