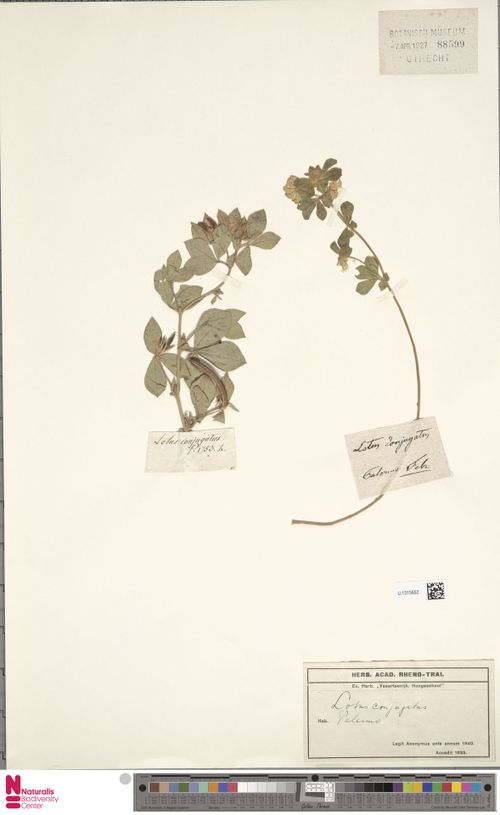

Scientific classification
- Kingdom: Plantae
- Clade: Tracheophytes
- Clade: Angiosperms
- Clade: Eudicots
- Clade: Rosids
- Order: Fabales
- Family: Fabaceae
- Subfamily: Faboideae
- Genus: Lotus
- Species: L. conjugatus

Binomial name
- Lotus conjugatus L.

= Lotus conjugatus =

Species of plant

Lotus conjugatus is a species of plant in the genus Lotus native from Sicily to Algeria and Tunisia.

== Subspecies ==
This species has a red flowered subspecies:

- Lotus conjugatus subsp. requienii

and a normal yellow flowered subspecies:

- Lotus conjugatus subsp. conjugatus
