= Lotus chazaliei =

Scientific classification
- Kingdom: Plantae
- Clade: Tracheophytes
- Clade: Angiosperms
- Clade: Eudicots
- Clade: Rosids
- Order: Fabales
- Family: Fabaceae
- Subfamily: Faboideae
- Genus: Lotus
- Species: L. chazaliei

Binomial name
- Lotus chazaliei H.Boissieu

Species of plant

Lotus chazaliei is a plant in the genus Lotus endemic to Morocco with some reports from the Sahara.

== Description ==
this plant has orange to bright yellow pea like flowers, that are clustered in threes. The plant is trailing with small circular hairy leaves. the seeds are distinct and brownish purple, coming off a hairy base. The entire plant except for the seeds and flowers is covered in thick white hairs.

== Conservation status ==
This plant is a perennial and has no status on the IUCN Red List.
