= Lotus × medioximus =

Scientific classification
- Kingdom: Plantae
- Clade: Tracheophytes
- Clade: Angiosperms
- Clade: Eudicots
- Clade: Rosids
- Order: Fabales
- Family: Fabaceae
- Subfamily: Faboideae
- Genus: Lotus
- Species: L. × medioximus

Binomial name
- Lotus × medioximus Husn.

Lotus × medioximus is a hybrid plant in the Lotus genus native to Europe. It is a hybrid between Lotus corniculatus and Lotus uliginosus.
