= Lotus maroccanus =

Conservation status
- Least Concern (IUCN 3.1)

Scientific classification
- Kingdom: Plantae
- Clade: Tracheophytes
- Clade: Angiosperms
- Clade: Eudicots
- Clade: Rosids
- Order: Fabales
- Family: Fabaceae
- Subfamily: Faboideae
- Genus: Lotus
- Species: L. maroccanus

Binomial name
- Lotus maroccanus Ball

Synonyms
- Lotus maroccanus var. villosissimus Maire

Species of plant

Lotus maroccanus is a species of plant in the pea family that is native to morocco. It grows in shrublands and in sandy areas. It may grow alongside roads and near the ocean among coastal sand dunes. It is a perennial herbaceous plant that resembles a shrub. It is noted for being particularly salt tolerant. In its native habitat it is a winter growing species and is frost tolerant, but is killed by low temperatures. The foliage is palatable to deer and rabbits outside of its native habitat.

== Description ==
Lotus maroccanus is a perennial plant that may have either a few or many stems with a thickness of as much as 10 centimeters at their base. The stems may branch many times or just a few and also may either grow upwards or along the ground (prostrate). The stems are covered in dense to very dense hairs that are 0.1–1.8 millimeters long. Their growth can make them resemble a low growing shrub. Stems may be up to 47 cm long 2.5 mm thick. Its root is tough and woody. They have wide, compound leaves.

== Taxonomy ==
Lotus maroccanus was scientifically described by John Ball in 1873.
