= Lotus becquetii =

Scientific classification
- Kingdom: Plantae
- Clade: Tracheophytes
- Clade: Angiosperms
- Clade: Eudicots
- Clade: Rosids
- Order: Fabales
- Family: Fabaceae
- Subfamily: Faboideae
- Genus: Lotus
- Species: L. becquetii

Binomial name
- Lotus becquetii Boutique

Species of plant

Lotus becquetii is a plant in the genus Lotus, native to South Sudan.

== Description ==
This plant is identified by its white pealike flowers that look like ballerina slippers, clustered around each other in a circle with a red base. This plant has hairless stems and has small circular leaves.

== Conservation status ==
This plant is Least Concern.
