= Lotus villicarpus =

Scientific classification
- Kingdom: Plantae
- Clade: Tracheophytes
- Clade: Angiosperms
- Clade: Eudicots
- Clade: Rosids
- Order: Fabales
- Family: Fabaceae
- Subfamily: Faboideae
- Genus: Lotus
- Species: L. villicarpus

Binomial name
- Lotus villicarpus Andr.

Species of plant

Lotus villicarpus is a plant in the genus Lotus native to Morocco.

== Description ==
This species is identified by its trailing habit, its dense, oval 6 leaved ray leaves, flowers that look like yellow vetch flowers, and heavily hairy leaves.

== Conservation status ==
This species is classified as Threatened.
