= Lotus jordanii =

Scientific classification
- Kingdom: Plantae
- Clade: Tracheophytes
- Clade: Angiosperms
- Clade: Eudicots
- Clade: Rosids
- Order: Fabales
- Family: Fabaceae
- Subfamily: Faboideae
- Genus: Lotus
- Species: L. jordanii

Binomial name
- Lotus jordanii (Loret & Barrandon) Coulot, Rabaute & J.-M.Tison

Species of plant

Lotus jordanii or Jordan's Lotus is a plant in the genus Lotus native to the coast of the western Mediterranean Sea. Its native range includes Algeria, the Balearic Islands, France, and Spain.

== Description ==
This plant is characterized by stiff erect stems giving way to a flowerhead of 15 to 25, pea-like, white, flowers. The plant leaves are in lobes of 3 clustered at the stem, going up, ending at the flowerhead.
