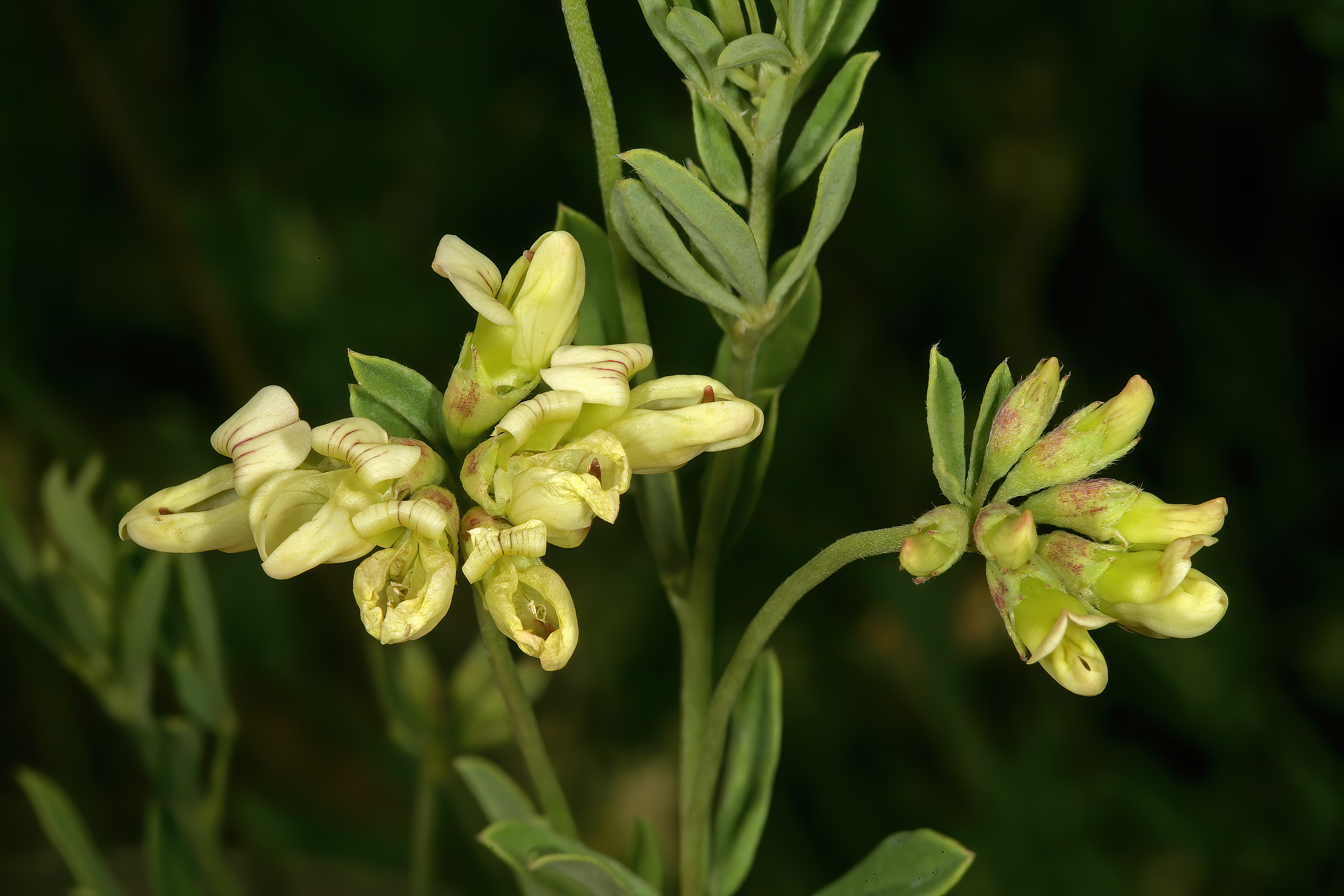

Scientific classification
- Kingdom: Plantae
- Clade: Embryophytes
- Clade: Tracheophytes
- Clade: Spermatophytes
- Clade: Angiosperms
- Clade: Eudicots
- Clade: Rosids
- Order: Fabales
- Family: Fabaceae
- Subfamily: Faboideae
- Genus: Lotus
- Species: L. discolor

Binomial name
- Lotus discolor E.Mey.

= Lotus discolor =

Species of plant

Lotus discolor is a species of plant in the family Fabaceae. It is native to Angola, Cameroon, Cape Provinces, Democratic Republic of the Congo, Eswatini, Ethiopia, Kenya, KwaZulu-Natal, Malawi, Mozambique, Nigeria, Northern Provinces, Tanzania, Uganda, Zambia, and Zimbabwe.

== Description ==
The plant has clustered white pea like flowers and small oval hairless leaves.

== Subspecies ==
The USDA recognizes a subspecies, Lotus discolor subsp. mollis.

== Conservation status ==
This species's status is not threatened.
