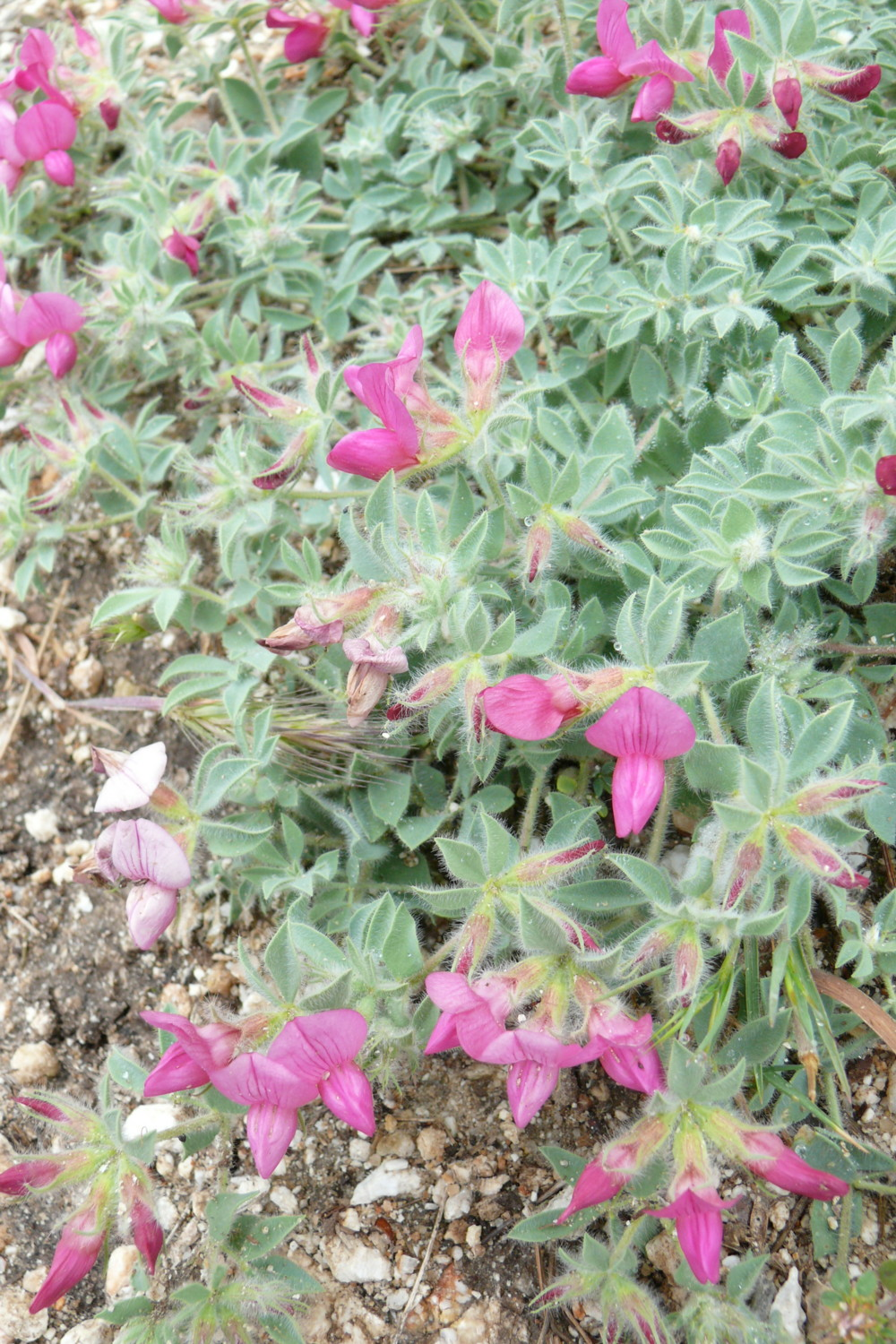

Scientific classification
- Kingdom: Plantae
- Clade: Embryophytes
- Clade: Tracheophytes
- Clade: Spermatophytes
- Clade: Angiosperms
- Clade: Eudicots
- Clade: Rosids
- Order: Fabales
- Family: Fabaceae
- Subfamily: Faboideae
- Genus: Lotus
- Species: L. aduncus

Binomial name
- Lotus aduncus (Griseb.) Nyman

Synonyms
- Tetragonolobus aduncus

= Lotus aduncus =

Species of plant

Lotus aduncus species of Lotus that is endemic to Thasos, Greece. It is perennial and grows in a subtropical biome. It was first described in 1855 by Carl Fredrik Nyman.

== Characteristics ==
This species grows leaves that has fur-like trichomes, the buds may look identical to the leaves but are concaved and pink-tipped. The flowers are pink and look much like orchids.
