= Lotus garcinii =

Scientific classification
- Kingdom: Plantae
- Clade: Tracheophytes
- Clade: Angiosperms
- Clade: Eudicots
- Clade: Rosids
- Order: Fabales
- Family: Fabaceae
- Subfamily: Faboideae
- Genus: Lotus
- Species: L. garcinii

Binomial name
- Lotus garcinii DC.

Species of plant

Lotus garcinii, the desert trefoil, is a plant in the genus Lotus ranging from Somalia, eastern Socotra (including Abd al Kuri), and the Arabian Peninsula to Pakistan.

== Description ==
This species is annual to perennial depending on where it is found. The leaves are small and velvety. The flowers are reddish.
