= Lotus davyae =

Scientific classification
- Kingdom: Plantae
- Clade: Tracheophytes
- Clade: Angiosperms
- Clade: Eudicots
- Clade: Rosids
- Order: Fabales
- Family: Fabaceae
- Subfamily: Faboideae
- Genus: Lotus
- Species: L. davyae

Binomial name
- Lotus davyae Druce

Species of plant

Lotus davyae is a hybrid Lotus from western Europe.

== Lifecycle ==
Depending on the location it can be annual or perennial.
