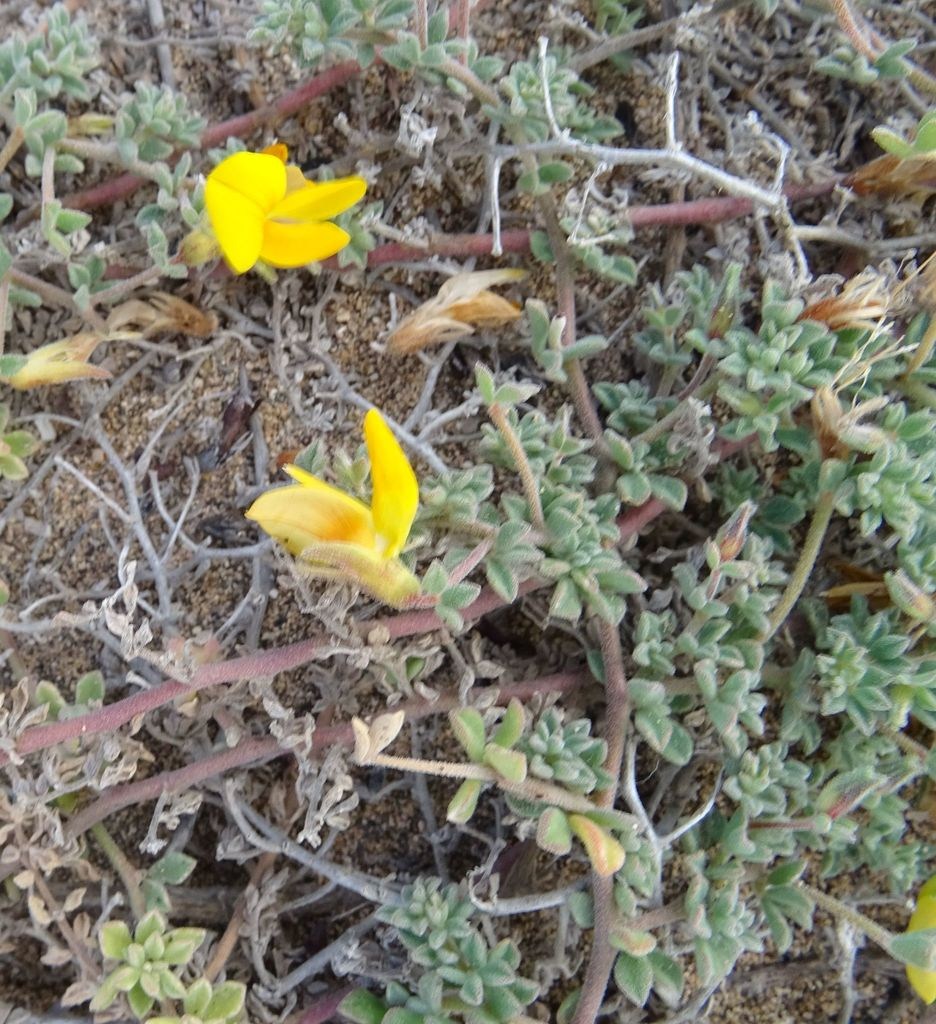

Scientific classification
- Kingdom: Plantae
- Clade: Tracheophytes
- Clade: Angiosperms
- Clade: Eudicots
- Clade: Rosids
- Order: Fabales
- Family: Fabaceae
- Subfamily: Faboideae
- Genus: Lotus
- Species: L. arinagensis

Binomial name
- Lotus arinagensis Bramwell

= Lotus arinagensis =

Species of flowering plant

Lotus arinagensis or the Arinaga heart-shaped is a perennial plant in the genus Lotus endemic to the Canary Islands. It grows only in eastern Gran Canaria, always near to the coast.

== Description ==
This species is identified by its woody stems and leaves and massive trailing habit. The mature leaves are very thinly spaced and sized. The flowers stick up in the normal lotus form in clusters of two to four. This species has unique seed heads looking like a sword with a spiked holder.

== Conservation status ==
This species is considered Threatened by the Kew database.
