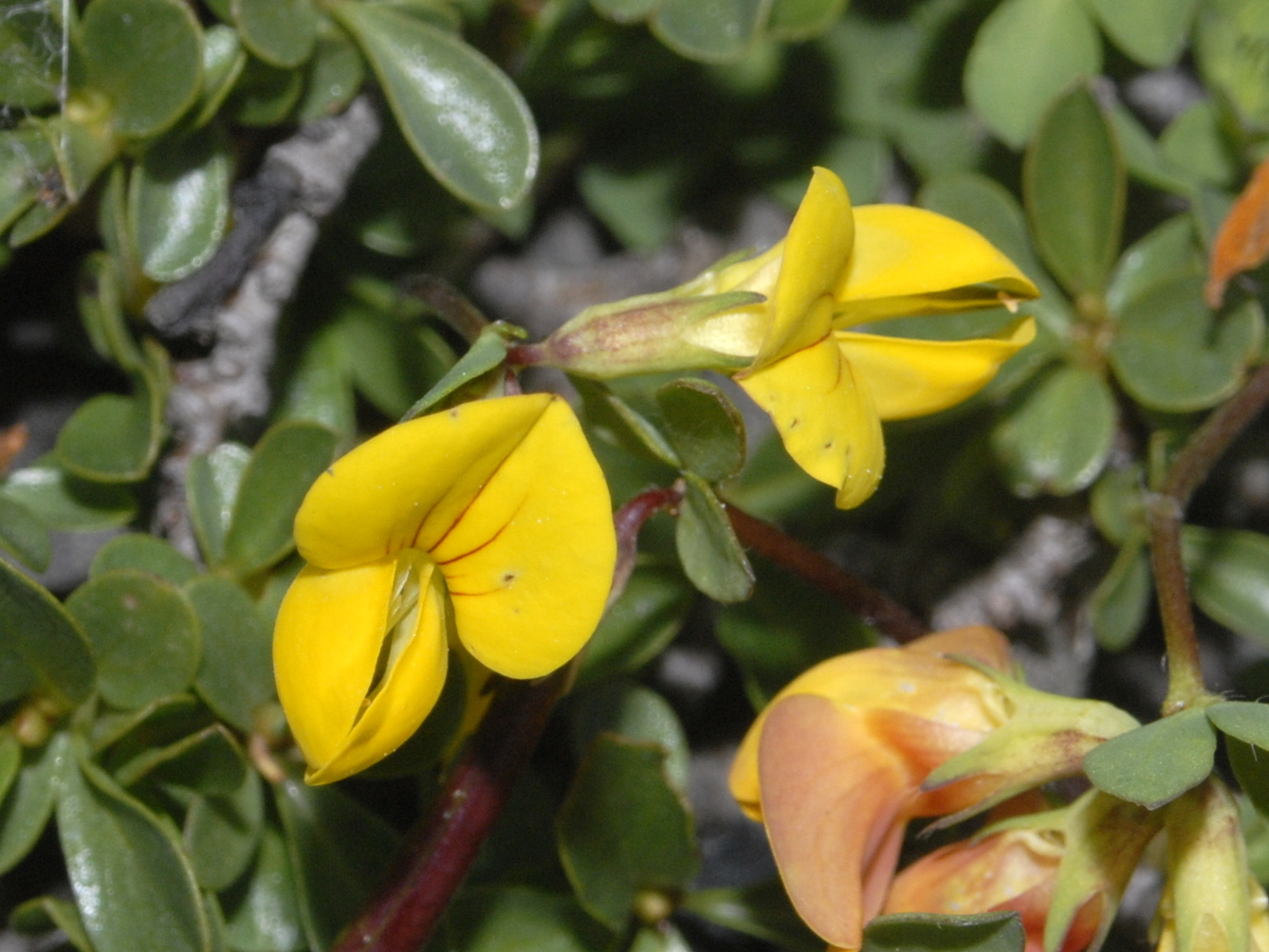
- Lotus alpinus at the Giardino Botanico Alpino Chanousia

Scientific classification
- Kingdom: Plantae
- Clade: Tracheophytes
- Clade: Angiosperms
- Clade: Eudicots
- Clade: Rosids
- Order: Fabales
- Family: Fabaceae
- Subfamily: Faboideae
- Genus: Lotus
- Species: L. alpinus

Binomial name
- Lotus alpinus (Ser.) Schleich. ex Ramond

Synonyms
- Lotus corniculatus var. alpinus Ser

= Lotus alpinus =

Species of legume

Lotus alpinus, common name alpine bird's-foot trefoil, is a species of legume in the family Fabaceae.

== Description ==
L. alpinus can reach a height of 2–10 cm (0.79–3.94 in). It is a perennial herbaceous plant, typically sprawling horizontally at the height of the surrounding grassland or rocky surfaces. The base of its stem is woody. Flowers are pea flower-shaped and may be yellow, orange, or reddish. They bloom from May to August

== Distribution ==
L. alpinus is a species of the mountain regions of the southern Europe (Austria, Germany, Switzerland, former Yugoslavia, Italy, France, and Spain), particularly the Alps and the Pyrenees.

== Habitat ==
Alpine bird's-foot trefoil can be found in subalpine or alpine pastures and rocky areas, at elevation of 1,700–2,700 m (5,600–8,900 ft) above sea level.
