= Lotus jolyi =

Scientific classification
- Kingdom: Plantae
- Clade: Tracheophytes
- Clade: Angiosperms
- Clade: Eudicots
- Clade: Rosids
- Order: Fabales
- Family: Fabaceae
- Subfamily: Faboideae
- Genus: Lotus
- Species: L. jolyi

Binomial name
- Lotus jolyi Batt.

Species of plant

Lotus jolyi is a plant in the genus Lotus that grows in the Sahara. It is annual and grows in dry scrubland.

== Conservation status ==
This plant is classified as not threatened by Kew.
