= Lotus hebecarpus =

Scientific classification
- Kingdom: Plantae
- Clade: Tracheophytes
- Clade: Angiosperms
- Clade: Eudicots
- Clade: Rosids
- Order: Fabales
- Family: Fabaceae
- Subfamily: Faboideae
- Genus: Lotus
- Species: L. hebecarpus

Binomial name
- Lotus hebecarpus J.B.Gillett

Species of plant

Lotus hebecarpus is an annual to perennial plant in the genus Lotus ranging from NE Sudan to Djibouti.

== Classification status ==
This species is classified as Not Threatened by the Kew database.

== Recording ==
Kew holds the only herbarium record available online for this species.
