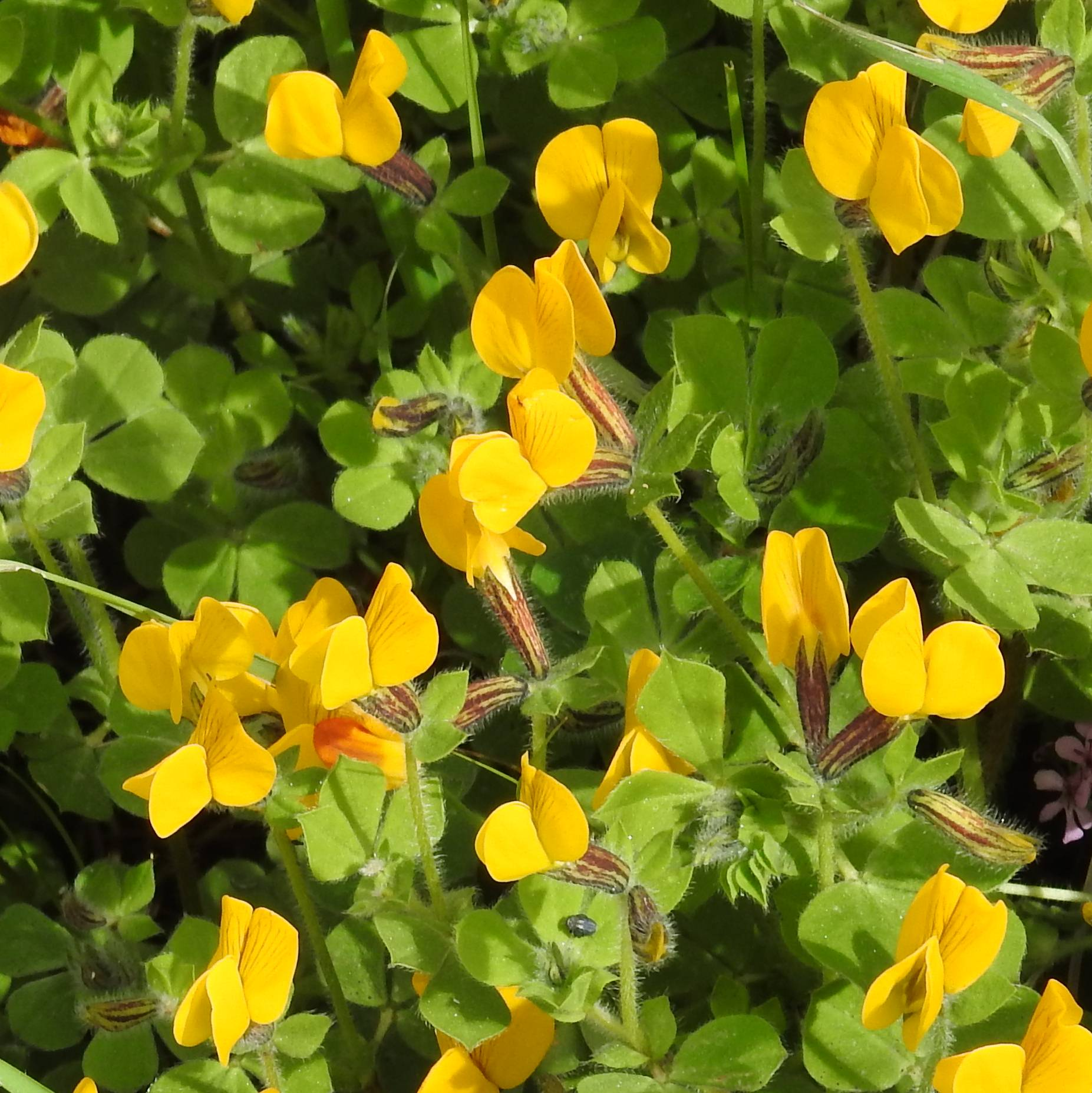

Scientific classification
- Kingdom: Plantae
- Clade: Tracheophytes
- Clade: Angiosperms
- Clade: Eudicots
- Clade: Rosids
- Order: Fabales
- Family: Fabaceae
- Subfamily: Faboideae
- Genus: Lotus
- Species: L. biflorus

Binomial name
- Lotus biflorus Desr.

Synonyms
- Tetragonolobus biflorus (Desr.) Ser.; Tetragonolobus biflorus var. leiolobus Maire; Tetragonolobus biflorus var. luteus Alef.; Tetragonolobus biflorus var. purpureus Alef.; Tetragonolobus monanthos Sacc. & Penz.

= Lotus biflorus =

Species of flowering plant

Lotus biflorus is a species in the genus Lotus native to southern Italy, Algeria to Tunisia.

== Description ==
This species is identified by pea like smooth leaves. They also are identified by canary yellow sweet pea like flowers.
