= Lotus aegaeus =

Scientific classification
- Kingdom: Plantae
- Clade: Embryophytes
- Clade: Tracheophytes
- Clade: Spermatophytes
- Clade: Angiosperms
- Clade: Eudicots
- Clade: Rosids
- Order: Fabales
- Family: Fabaceae
- Subfamily: Faboideae
- Genus: Lotus
- Species: L. aegaeus

Binomial name
- Lotus aegaeus (Griseb.) Boiss.

Species of plant

Lotus aegaeus or the Aegean bird's-foot trefoil is a perennial plant in the family Fabaceae and genus Lotus native from the Balkan Peninsula to Northwestern Iran.

== Description ==
Lotus aegaeus is identified by its dark green hairy leaves and white flowers tinged yellow. Lotus aegaeus blooms in May, June, and July.

== Distribution and habitat ==
Lotus aegaeus has some sporadic occurrences in Mexico near the US border. Lotus aegaeus grows in rocky and dry cultivated areas and gravelly dry slopes.

== Other names ==
Lotus aegaeus also goes by the common name Aegean Birds Trefoil. The old name that Lotus aegaeus was known as was Lotus sulphureus.
