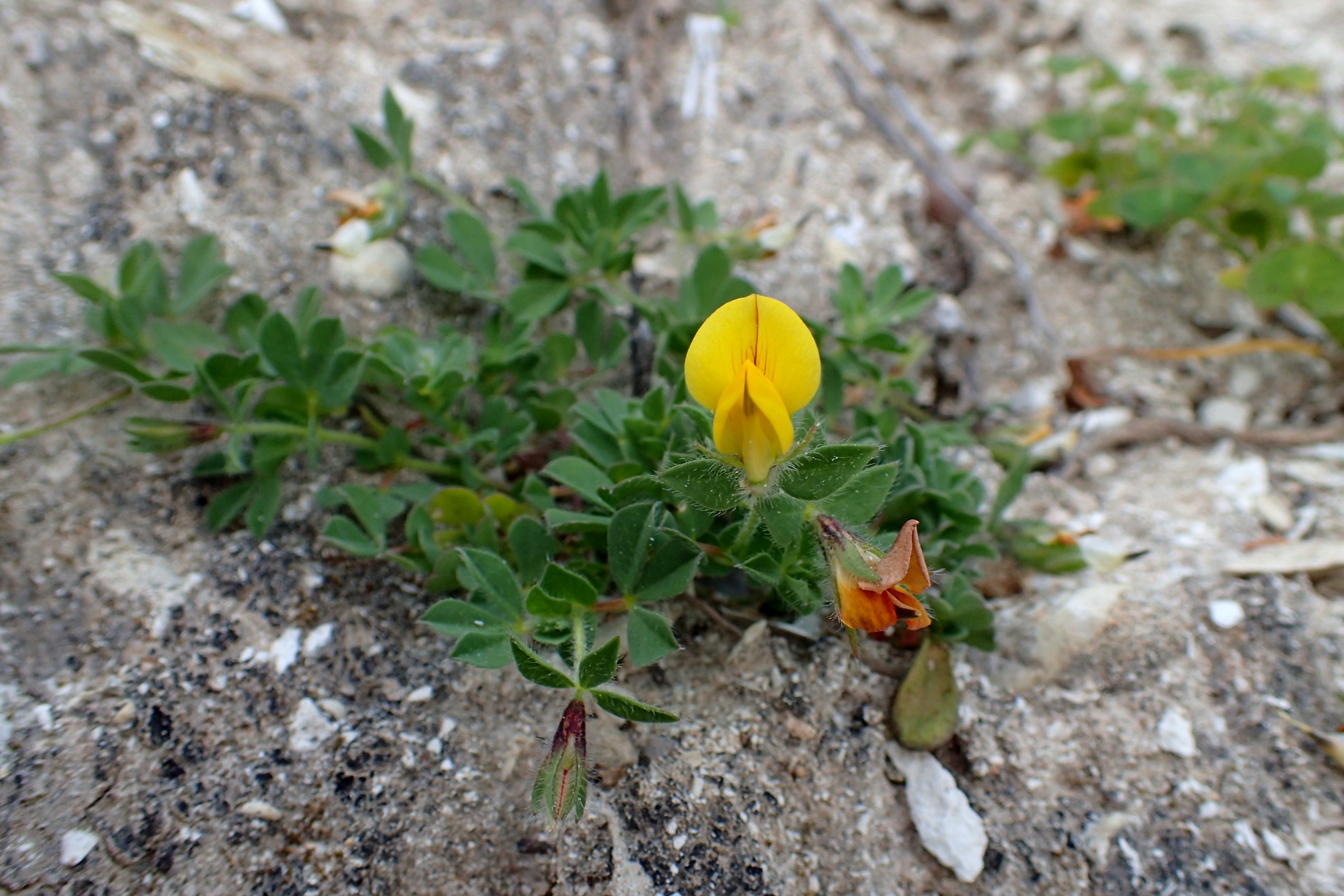

Scientific classification
- Kingdom: Plantae
- Clade: Embryophytes
- Clade: Tracheophytes
- Clade: Spermatophytes
- Clade: Angiosperms
- Clade: Eudicots
- Clade: Rosids
- Order: Fabales
- Family: Fabaceae
- Subfamily: Faboideae
- Genus: Lotus
- Species: L. edulis

Binomial name
- Lotus edulis L.

= Lotus edulis =

Species of plant

Lotus edulis is a species of annual herb in the family Fabaceae ativ to the Mediterranean. They have a self-supporting growth form and compound, broad leaves. Individuals can grow to 0.14 m.

== Sources ==
This article incorporates text from a free content work. Licensed under CC0 (license statement/permission). Text taken from Lotus edulis. Encyclopedia of Life.
