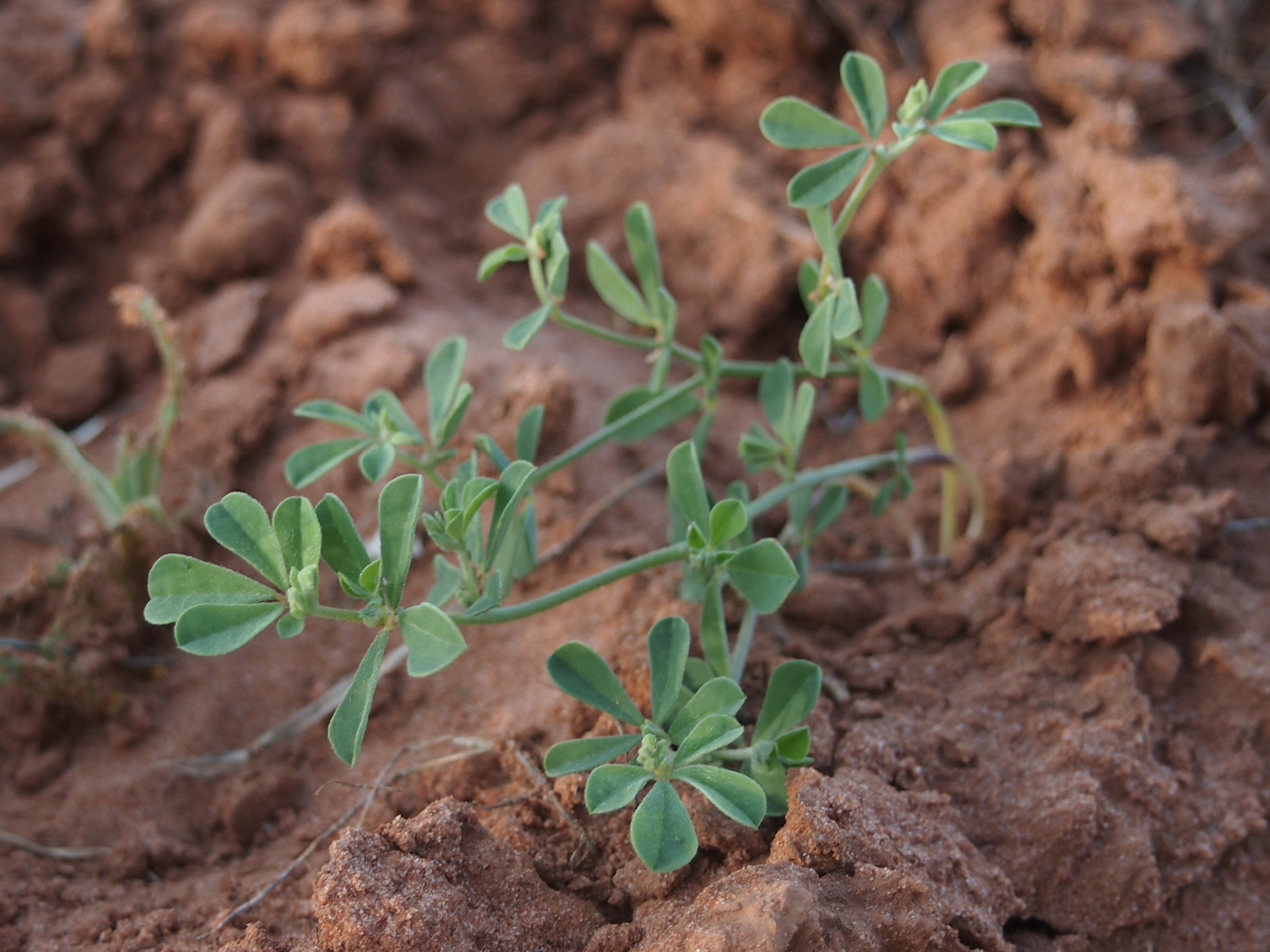

Scientific classification
- Kingdom: Plantae
- Clade: Tracheophytes
- Clade: Angiosperms
- Clade: Eudicots
- Clade: Rosids
- Order: Fabales
- Family: Fabaceae
- Subfamily: Faboideae
- Genus: Lotus
- Species: L. cruentus

Binomial name
- Lotus cruentus Court

= Lotus cruentus =

Species of plant

Lotus cruentus, the redflower lotus, is a species of Lotus native to Australia.

== Description ==
This species is a small, hairy leaved, trailing annual creeper, that grows near areas where water dries up. The flowers are pink or red, pealike, and sometimes streaked with lighter colors.

== Conservation status ==
This species is classified as not threatened.
