= Lotus carpetanus =

Scientific classification
- Kingdom: Plantae
- Clade: Embryophytes
- Clade: Tracheophytes
- Clade: Spermatophytes
- Clade: Angiosperms
- Clade: Eudicots
- Clade: Rosids
- Order: Fabales
- Family: Fabaceae
- Subfamily: Faboideae
- Genus: Lotus
- Species: L. carpetanus

Binomial name
- Lotus carpetanus Lacaita

Species of plant

Lotus carpetanus is a perennial plant in the genus Lotus native to the Iberian Peninsula.

== Description ==
this species is identified by its four flower heads, that look like peas, streaked orange. The leaves of this plant are hairy, circular lobed, in lobes of 3. the bottom of the flower head is reddish and hairy. This species is mat forming.

== Conservation status ==
It is suspected that this species might be threatened, but there is low confidence according to the Kew database.
