= Lotus hebranicus =

Scientific classification
- Kingdom: Plantae
- Clade: Tracheophytes
- Clade: Angiosperms
- Clade: Eudicots
- Clade: Rosids
- Order: Fabales
- Family: Fabaceae
- Subfamily: Faboideae
- Genus: Lotus
- Species: L. hebranicus

Binomial name
- Lotus hebranicus Hochst. ex Brand

Species of plant

Lotus hebranicus is a rare shrubby plant in the genus Lotus ranging Sinai to Eritrea.

== Appearance ==
This species is identified by small light pink vetch-like flowers, with magenta striping. the plant is shrubby, forming a bush much like grouse. the plant has two to three lobes per hairless leaf.

This species is considered not threatened by the Kew database.

== Other ==
There has been success in creating root cultures of this plant.
