= Lotus robsonii =

Scientific classification
- Kingdom: Plantae
- Clade: Tracheophytes
- Clade: Angiosperms
- Clade: Eudicots
- Clade: Rosids
- Order: Fabales
- Family: Fabaceae
- Subfamily: Faboideae
- Genus: Lotus
- Species: L. robsonii

Binomial name
- Lotus robsonii E.S.Martins & D.D.Sokoloff

Species of plant

Lotus robsonii is a rare plant in the genus Lotus endemic to Malawi.

== Description ==
This species just looks like a classic Lotus except the seed pods are a lot smaller and pointed.

== Conservation status ==
This species is classified as threatened by the Kew database.
