= Lotus anfractuosus =

Scientific classification
- Kingdom: Plantae
- Clade: Tracheophytes
- Clade: Angiosperms
- Clade: Eudicots
- Clade: Rosids
- Order: Fabales
- Family: Fabaceae
- Subfamily: Faboideae
- Genus: Lotus
- Species: L. anfractuosus

Binomial name
- Lotus anfractuosus (Baker f.) Kramina & D.D.Sokoloff

Species of plant

Lotus anfractuosus is a plant in the genus Lotus ranging from Vanuatu to New Caledonia.

== Description ==
This species is identified by its flowers that look like vetch flowers. The leaves of this plant are succulent as are its stems. The flowers are magenta and have three distinct darker stripes on each of the top petals towards the bottom.

== Taxonomy ==
This species is part of the Lotus australis complex.

There are two subspecies of Lotus anfractuosus:

- Lotus anfractuosus var. anfractuosus (New Caledonia only)
- Lotus anfractuosus var. vanuatensis (Vanuatu only)
