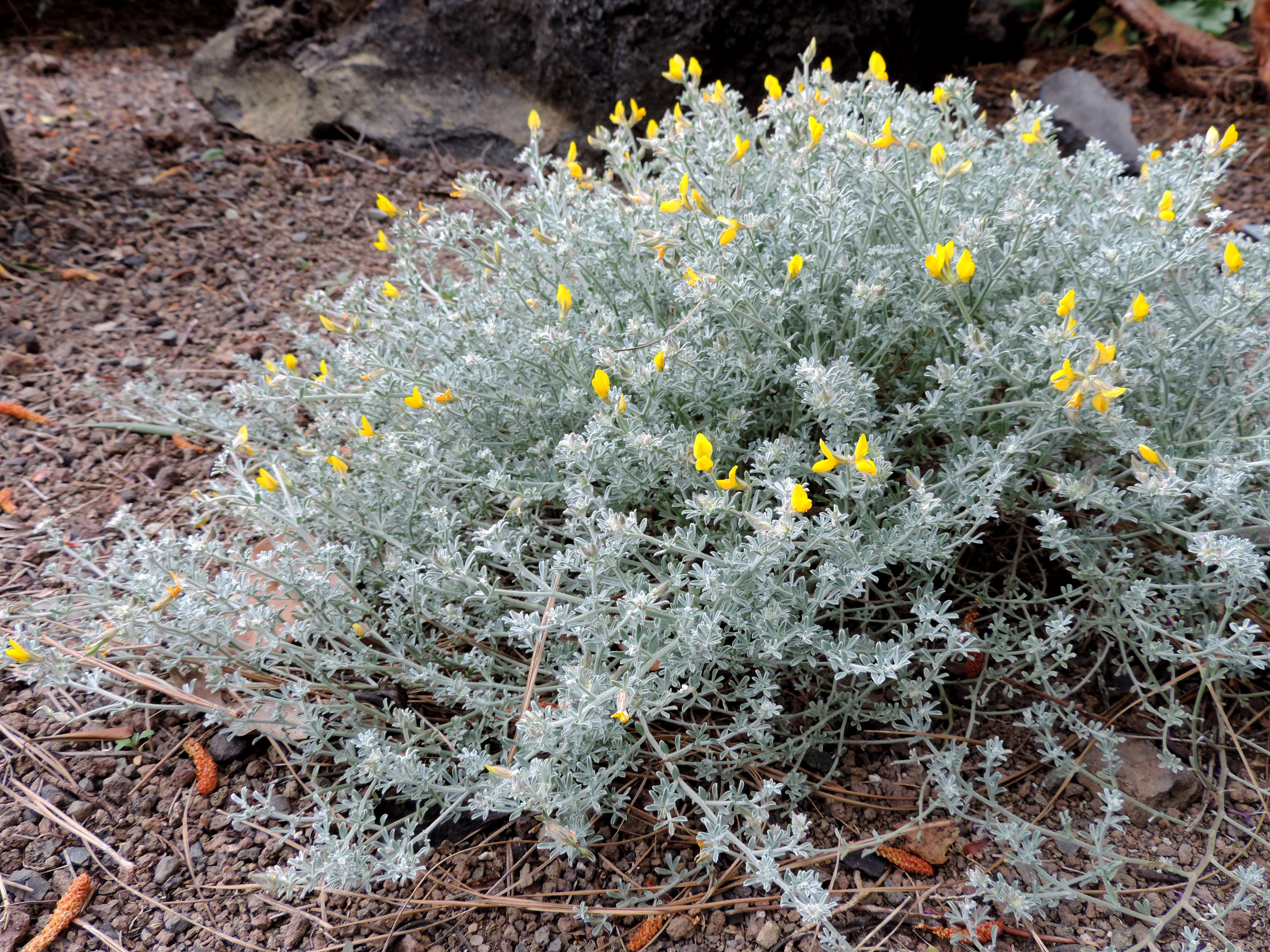

Scientific classification
- Kingdom: Plantae
- Clade: Tracheophytes
- Clade: Angiosperms
- Clade: Eudicots
- Clade: Rosids
- Order: Fabales
- Family: Fabaceae
- Subfamily: Faboideae
- Genus: Lotus
- Species: L. holosericeus

Binomial name
- Lotus holosericeus Webb & Berthel.

= Lotus holosericeus =

Species of plant

Lotus holosericeus or silvery heartwort is a plant in the genus Lotus endemic to the Canary Islands (Gran Canaria).

== Description ==
This species is a subshrub with hairy leaves, small vetch-like flowers, with the top lined through and the bottom looking of that of a normal pea family plant. the hairs on the leaves are greyish and the leaves are the color of sagebrush.

== Conservation status ==
This species is considered Threatened by the Kew database.
