= Lotus assakensis =

Scientific classification
- Kingdom: Plantae
- Clade: Tracheophytes
- Clade: Angiosperms
- Clade: Eudicots
- Clade: Rosids
- Order: Fabales
- Family: Fabaceae
- Subfamily: Faboideae
- Genus: Lotus
- Species: L. assakensis

Binomial name
- Lotus assakensis Coss. ex Brand

Species of plant

Lotus assakensis is a plant from the Lotus genus native from Morocco to Mauritania.

== Description ==
This species is identified from a large upright woody stem that gives way to small oval hairy leaves. The seed pods are reddish. The flowers of this species are clustered in clusters of four and look like very small yellow vetch flowers, with small teeth towards the bottom petals.

== Parasitization ==
The species is a host for Uromyces euphorbiae-corniculatae, which is a fungus that creates galls on every part of the plant. The fungus is a parasite that has a relationship of commensalism with select aphids and mites.
