= Lotus kunkelii =

Scientific classification
- Kingdom: Plantae
- Clade: Tracheophytes
- Clade: Angiosperms
- Clade: Eudicots
- Clade: Rosids
- Order: Fabales
- Family: Fabaceae
- Subfamily: Faboideae
- Genus: Lotus
- Species: L. kunkelii

Binomial name
- Lotus kunkelii (Esteve) Bramwell & D.H.Davis

Species of flowering plant

Lotus kunkelii is a subshrub native to the Canary Islands in the Lotus genus.

== Description ==
This species has small clustered hairy leaves coming off a main stem. The flowers are yellow and small and look like unclustered yellow pea flowers. The leaves are rectangular.

== Conservation status ==
This species was thought extinct then rediscovered in 1973.

This species is classified as critically endangered.
