= Lotus longisiliquosus =

Scientific classification
- Kingdom: Plantae
- Clade: Tracheophytes
- Clade: Angiosperms
- Clade: Eudicots
- Clade: Rosids
- Order: Fabales
- Family: Fabaceae
- Subfamily: Faboideae
- Genus: Lotus
- Species: L. longisiliquosus

Binomial name
- Lotus longisiliquosus R.Roem.

Species of plant

Lotus longisiliquosus is a plant in the Lotus genus that is native to The Mediterranean.

It is also known as Judean Bird's Foot Trefoil or לוטוס יהודה in Israel.

== Description ==
the plant has three to four yellow generic Lotus flowers each with a three margined leaf behind the flowerhead.

The leaves also are three margined, hairless and silvery.

== Conservation status ==
This plant is considered Least Concern.
