= Lotus fulgurans =

Scientific classification
- Kingdom: Plantae
- Clade: Tracheophytes
- Clade: Angiosperms
- Clade: Eudicots
- Clade: Rosids
- Order: Fabales
- Family: Fabaceae
- Subfamily: Faboideae
- Genus: Lotus
- Species: L. fulgurans

Binomial name
- Lotus fulgurans (Porta) D.D.Sokoloff

Synonyms
- Anthyllis fulgurans Porta; Anthyllis fulgurans var. efulgurata P.Palau; Dorycnium fulgurans (Porta) Lassen; Dorycnium pentaphyllum subsp. fulgurans (Porta) Cardona, Lorens & Sierra

Species of plant

Lotus fulgurans is a species of flowering plant in the family Fabaceae, native to the Balearic Islands. It is closely related to, but reproductively isolated from, the widespread species Lotus dorycnium.
