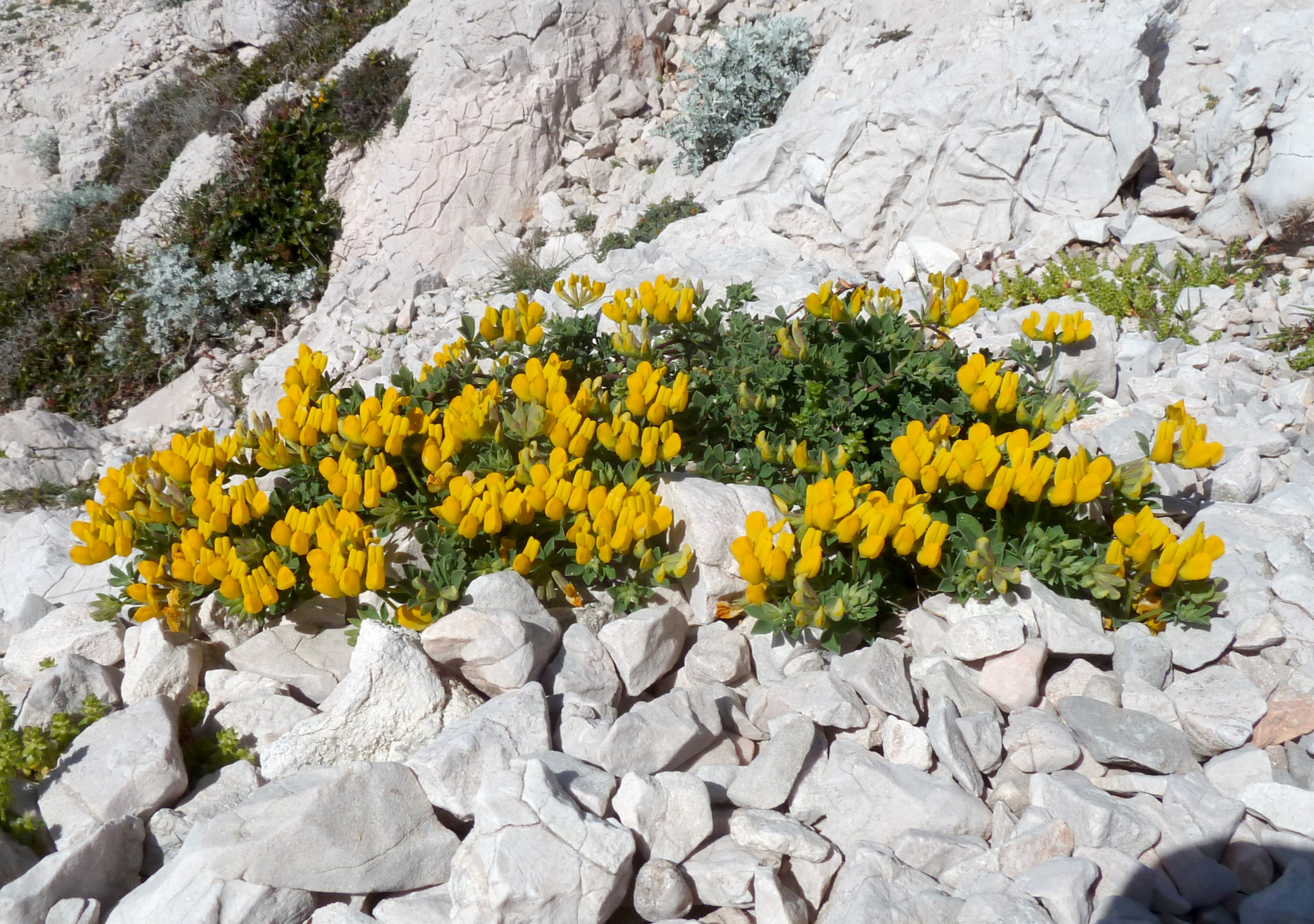

Scientific classification
- Kingdom: Plantae
- Clade: Tracheophytes
- Clade: Angiosperms
- Clade: Eudicots
- Clade: Rosids
- Order: Fabales
- Family: Fabaceae
- Subfamily: Faboideae
- Genus: Lotus
- Species: L. drepanocarpus

Binomial name
- Lotus drepanocarpus Durieu

Synonyms
- Lotus cytisoides subsp. drepanocarpus (Durieu) D.Pav. & Véla; Lotus cytisoides proles drepanocarpus (Durieu) Rouy

= Lotus drepanocarpus =

Species of plant

Lotus drepanocarpus or the Fake Lotus Fruit is a perennial plant in the genus Lotus ranging from Algeria to Tunisia.

== Description ==
This species is identified as a trailing subshrub, with lightly hairy leaves, and four to six clustered, pea-like flowers.

== Introduced range ==
This species has been introduced to Yugoslavia and France.
