= Lotus lourdes-santiagoi =

Scientific classification
- Kingdom: Plantae
- Clade: Tracheophytes
- Clade: Angiosperms
- Clade: Eudicots
- Clade: Rosids
- Order: Fabales
- Family: Fabaceae
- Subfamily: Faboideae
- Genus: Lotus
- Species: L. lourdes-santiagoi

Binomial name
- Lotus lourdes-santiagoi Pina & Valdés

Species of plant

Lotus lourdes-santiagoi is a plant in the genus Lotus native to the areas around southern Spain.

== Date of discovery ==
This plant was discovered in 2000.
