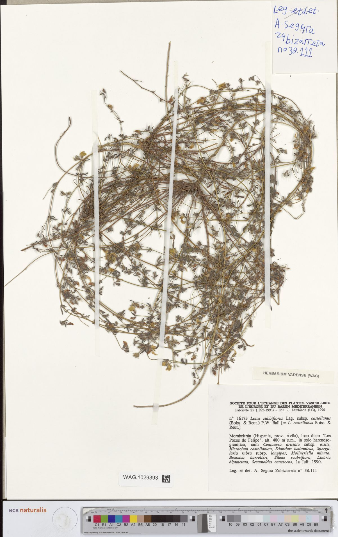

Scientific classification
- Kingdom: Plantae
- Clade: Tracheophytes
- Clade: Angiosperms
- Clade: Eudicots
- Clade: Rosids
- Order: Fabales
- Family: Fabaceae
- Subfamily: Faboideae
- Genus: Lotus
- Species: L. castellanus

Binomial name
- Lotus castellanus Boiss. & Reut.

= Lotus castellanus =

Species of plant

Lotus castellanus, also known as Flea Grass is a plant in the genus Lotus native from Western France to the Western Mediterranean.

== Description ==
The flowers of Lotus castellanus are bright yellow on the top and lighter on the bottom.

The small, clustered, oval leaves of Lotus castellanus are about four mm with unspaced small hairs.

The flowers have a small tooth towards the top with a small white end.

== Conservation status ==
Lotus castellanus is not threatened and can be common in some areas.
