= Lotus purpureus =

Scientific classification
- Kingdom: Plantae
- Clade: Tracheophytes
- Clade: Angiosperms
- Clade: Eudicots
- Clade: Rosids
- Order: Fabales
- Family: Fabaceae
- Subfamily: Faboideae
- Genus: Lotus
- Species: L. purpureus

Binomial name
- Lotus purpureus Webb

Synonyms
- Lotus arborescens Lowe ex Cout.; Lotus bollei Christ; Lotus candidissimus A.Chev.; Lotus coronillifolius Webb; Lotus hirtulus Lowe ex Cout.; Lotus hirtulus var. laxifolius Lowe ex Cout.

Species of flowering plant

Lotus purpureus is a species of flowering plant in the pea family (Fabaceae). It is endemic to the Cape Verde Islands.
