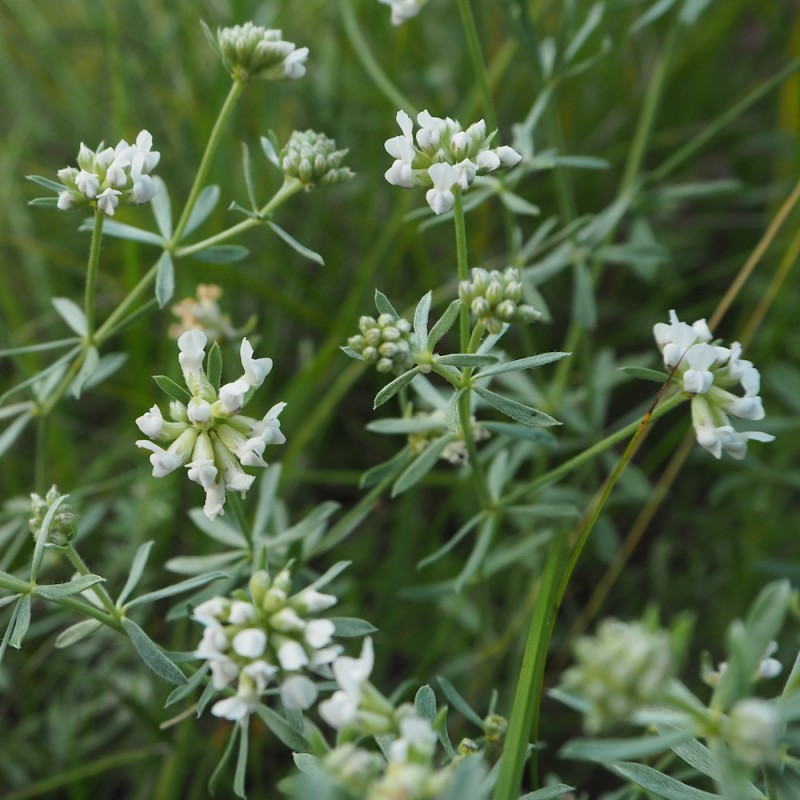

Scientific classification
- Kingdom: Plantae
- Clade: Tracheophytes
- Clade: Angiosperms
- Clade: Eudicots
- Clade: Rosids
- Order: Fabales
- Family: Fabaceae
- Subfamily: Faboideae
- Genus: Lotus
- Species: L. germanicus

Binomial name
- Lotus germanicus (Gremli) Peruzzi

= Lotus germanicus =

Species of plant

Lotus germanicus is a species of plant in the genus Lotus native to Central and Southeastern Europe.

== Description ==
This species is a perennial subshrub. This species is identified by cream white flowers, in large full-moon bunches, atop semi hairy long leaves.

== Conservation status ==
This species is considered Not Threatened by the Kew database.
