= Lotus borbasii =

Scientific classification
- Kingdom: Plantae
- Clade: Tracheophytes
- Clade: Angiosperms
- Clade: Eudicots
- Clade: Rosids
- Order: Fabales
- Family: Fabaceae
- Subfamily: Faboideae
- Genus: Lotus
- Species: L. borbasii

Binomial name
- Lotus borbasii Ujhelyi

Species of flowering plant

Lotus borbasii is a perennial plant in the genus Lotus native to E. Central Europe to Hercegovina.

== Description ==
This species is identified by a half moon of classic yellow lotus flowers, in a four per head ring. This species also is identified by its lightly hairy 3 to 6 lobed leaves.

== Conservation status ==
This species is least concern according to the Kew database.
