= Lotus dumetorum =

Scientific classification
- Kingdom: Plantae
- Clade: Tracheophytes
- Clade: Angiosperms
- Clade: Eudicots
- Clade: Rosids
- Order: Fabales
- Family: Fabaceae
- Subfamily: Faboideae
- Genus: Lotus
- Species: L. dumetorum

Binomial name
- Lotus dumetorum Webb ex R.P.Murray

Species of plant

Lotus dumetorum is a plant in the genus Lotus endemic to the Canary Islands (S. Tenerife).

== Description ==
This species is a semi hairy subshrub characterized by having two to three pea-like flowers per head. it is heavily branched and has reddish brown fruits.

== Habitat ==
This species grows in rocky areas or on slopes around thermophilic forest.
