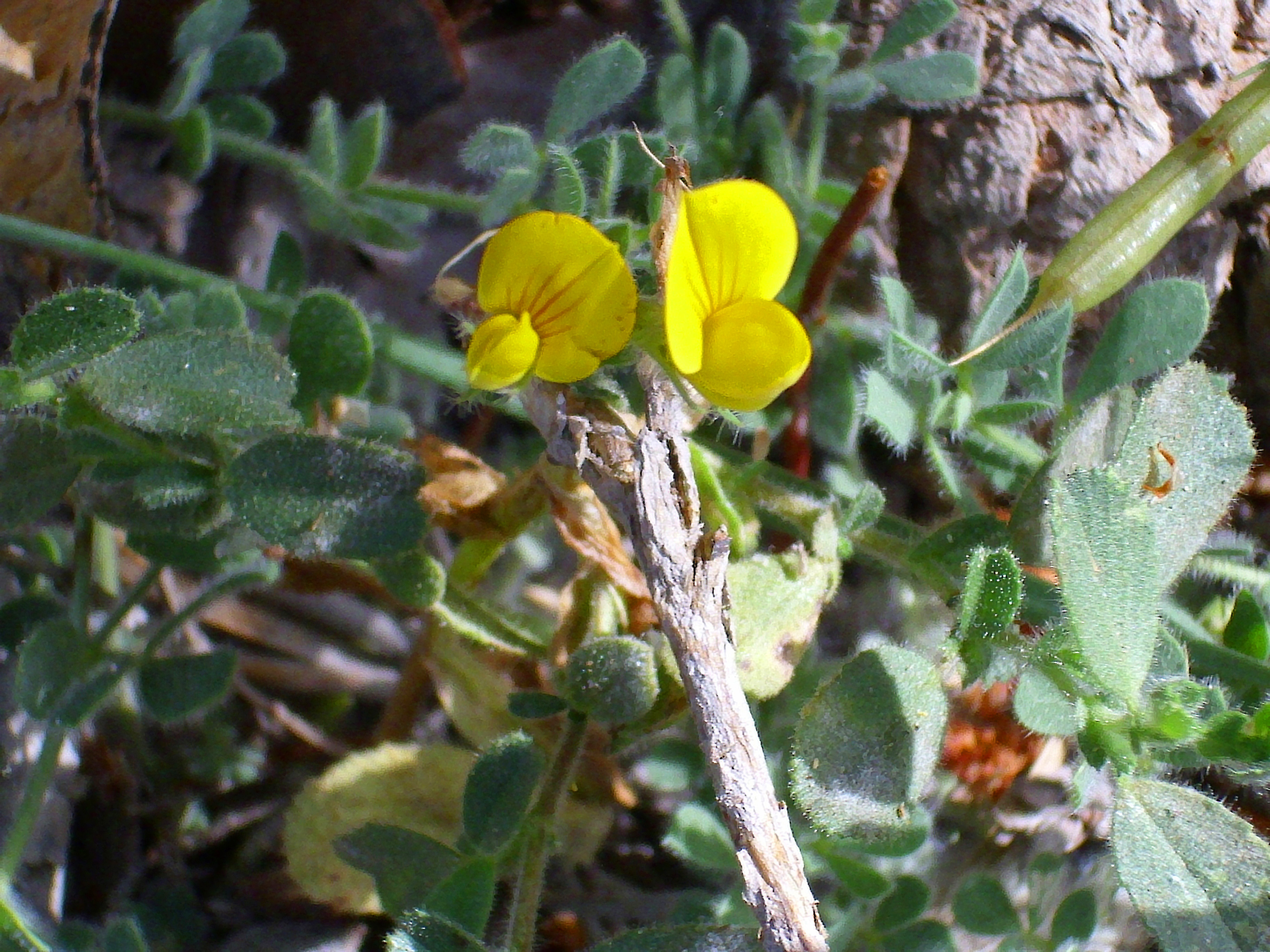

Scientific classification
- Kingdom: Plantae
- Clade: Tracheophytes
- Clade: Angiosperms
- Clade: Eudicots
- Clade: Rosids
- Order: Fabales
- Family: Fabaceae
- Subfamily: Faboideae
- Genus: Lotus
- Species: L. glareosus

Binomial name
- Lotus glareosus Boiss. & Reut.

= Lotus glareosus =

Species of plant

Lotus glareosus is a species of plant in the genus Lotus native to the Iberian Peninsula and Morocco.

== Description ==
This species is a perennial or subshrub that has puffed out pea-like yellow flowers, with faint red striping. The leaves and stems are hairy. there are three to four leaflets per leaf. The budding flowers are reddish.
