= Lotus divaricatus =

Scientific classification
- Kingdom: Plantae
- Clade: Tracheophytes
- Clade: Angiosperms
- Clade: Eudicots
- Clade: Rosids
- Order: Fabales
- Family: Fabaceae
- Subfamily: Faboideae
- Genus: Lotus
- Species: L. divaricatus

Binomial name
- Lotus divaricatus Boiss.

Species of plant

Lotus divaricatus is a plant in the genus Lotus native from E. Aegean Islands to W. Türkiye.

== Associations ==
This species has been found with the Mesorhizobium jarvisii, which is a fungus native to New Zealand.

== Places introduced ==
This species has been introduced to New Zealand, and is kept as a forage crop in the Australian Pastures Seed Bank.
