= Lotus lebrunii =

Scientific classification
- Kingdom: Plantae
- Clade: Tracheophytes
- Clade: Angiosperms
- Clade: Eudicots
- Clade: Rosids
- Order: Fabales
- Family: Fabaceae
- Subfamily: Faboideae
- Genus: Lotus
- Species: L. lebrunii

Binomial name
- Lotus lebrunii Boutique

Species of plant

Lotus lebrunii is species in the genus Lotus endemic to the DR Congo.

== Description ==
This species is a classic Lotus except for small clustered flowers in five to sevens.

It is a perennial trailing herb.

== Conservation status ==
This species is considered Threatened by the Kew database.

== Taxonomy ==
This species may be the result of introgression between L. becquetii & L. goetzei. It looks almost identical to L. becquetii.
