= Lotus brunneri =

Scientific classification
- Kingdom: Plantae
- Clade: Tracheophytes
- Clade: Angiosperms
- Clade: Eudicots
- Clade: Rosids
- Order: Fabales
- Family: Fabaceae
- Subfamily: Faboideae
- Genus: Lotus
- Species: L. brunneri

Binomial name
- Lotus brunneri Webb

Species of flowering plant

Lotus brunneri also known as Piorno is a subshrub in the genus Lotus endemic to Cape Verde.

== Description ==
This species is identified by its small green eucalyptus like succulent silvery haired leaves, on a woody stem. the flowers look like classic pea flowers except small, yellow and puffed.

This species has also been seen trailing depending on region.

== Conservation status ==
This species is considered Threatened by the Kew database.
