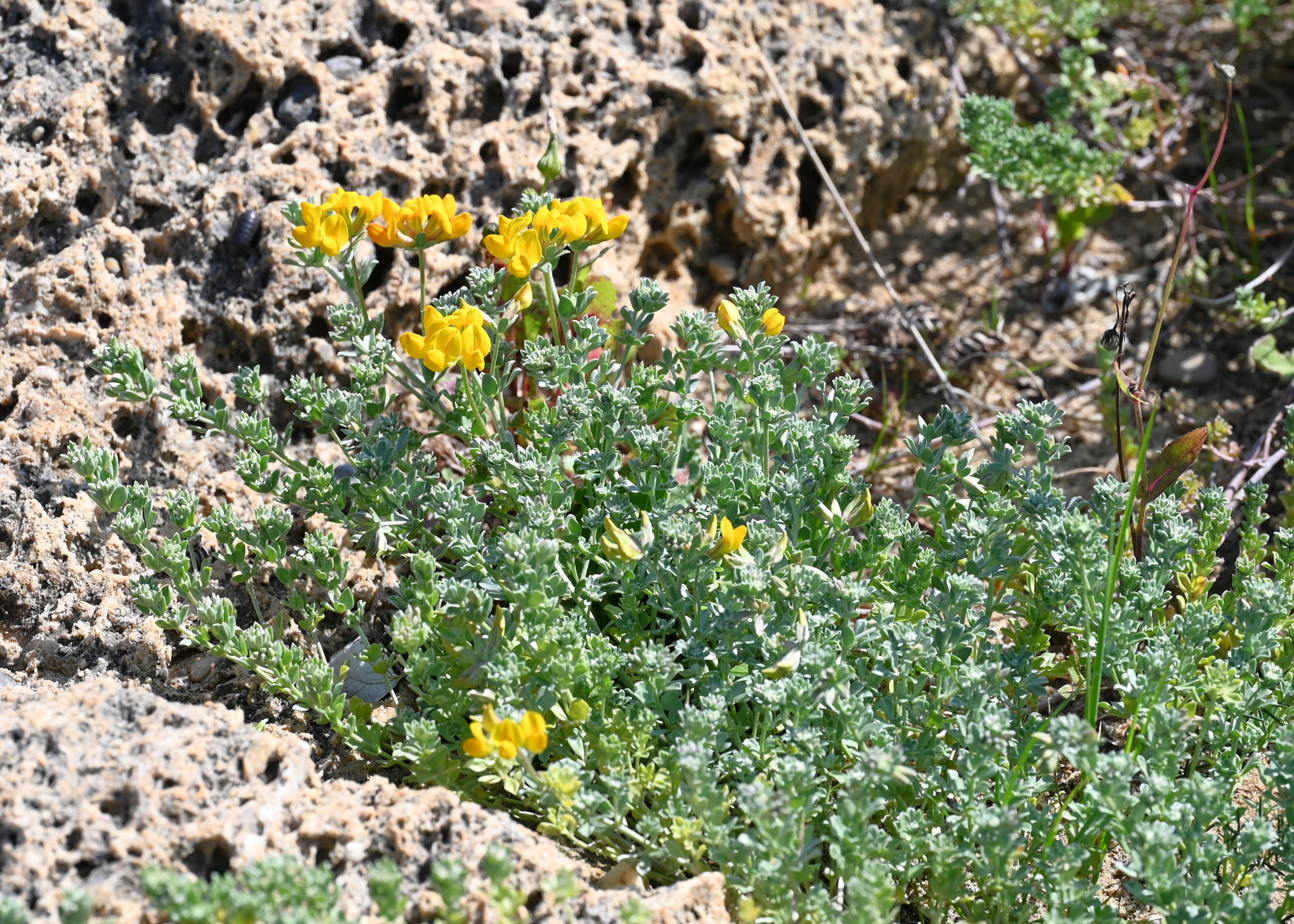

Scientific classification
- Kingdom: Plantae
- Clade: Tracheophytes
- Clade: Angiosperms
- Clade: Eudicots
- Clade: Rosids
- Order: Fabales
- Family: Fabaceae
- Subfamily: Faboideae
- Genus: Lotus
- Species: L. arenarius

Binomial name
- Lotus arenarius Brot.

= Lotus arenarius =

Species of plant

Lotus arenarius is a trailing plant in the Lotus genus ranging from Central & S. Portugal to S. Spain, Morocco, and Senegal.

== Identification ==
This plant is identified by its three spaced out pealike leaves and hairy stems that almost look sandy. The five clustered flower heads have hairs on the forked base giving way to small yellow pealike flowers.

This plant has smooth to hairy leaves depending on where it is found.
