= Lotus lanuginosus =

Scientific classification
- Kingdom: Plantae
- Clade: Tracheophytes
- Clade: Angiosperms
- Clade: Eudicots
- Clade: Rosids
- Order: Fabales
- Family: Fabaceae
- Subfamily: Faboideae
- Genus: Lotus
- Species: L. lanuginosus

Binomial name
- Lotus lanuginosus Vent.

Species of plant

Lotus lanuginosus is a perennial plant in the Lotus genus ranging from the eastern Mediterranean to the Arabian Peninsula.

This species is also known as desert lotus or לוֹטוּס מִדְבָּרִי in Hebrew.

== Description ==
This species has red to pink vetch-like flowers, a shrubby structure, and dark greenish leaves with white hairs.

== Conservation status ==
The Kew database considers this species as not threatened.
