= Lotus glacialis =

Scientific classification
- Kingdom: Plantae
- Clade: Tracheophytes
- Clade: Angiosperms
- Clade: Eudicots
- Clade: Rosids
- Order: Fabales
- Family: Fabaceae
- Subfamily: Faboideae
- Genus: Lotus
- Species: L. glacialis

Binomial name
- Lotus glacialis (Boiss.) Pau

Species of plant

Lotus glacialis is a perennial plant in the genus Lotus native to S. Spain (Sierra Nevada, Sierra de Baza).

== Description ==
This species has small yellow flowers that look like puffed up yellow peas, and small hairy heavily clustered leaves, on a woody trailing stem.
