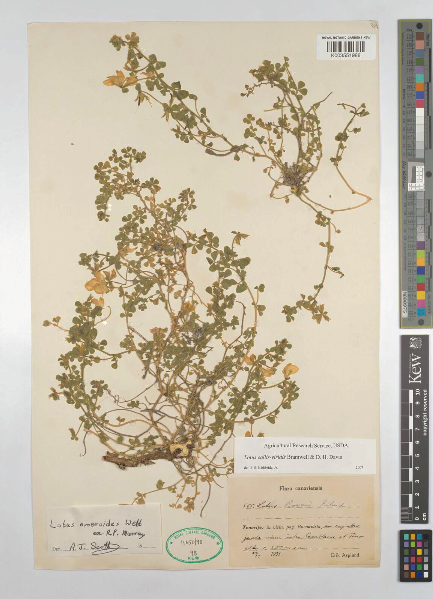

Scientific classification
- Kingdom: Plantae
- Clade: Tracheophytes
- Clade: Angiosperms
- Clade: Eudicots
- Clade: Rosids
- Order: Fabales
- Family: Fabaceae
- Subfamily: Faboideae
- Genus: Lotus
- Species: L. callis-viridis

Binomial name
- Lotus callis-viridis Bramwell & D.H.Davis

= Lotus callis-viridis =

Species of plant

Lotus callis-viridis or Green Platform Heartwort is a plant in the genus Lotus endemic to the island of Gran Canaria in the Canary Islands.

== Description ==
Lotus callis-viridis is a trailing perennial with yellow pea like flowers organized in clusters of three.

The leaves of Lotus callis-viridis are semi to very hairy and silvery green to dark green, coming off of trailing woody stems.

== Conservation status ==
This plant is classified as endangered by the ICCN and is in decline.
