= Lotus loweanus =

Scientific classification
- Kingdom: Plantae
- Clade: Tracheophytes
- Clade: Angiosperms
- Clade: Eudicots
- Clade: Rosids
- Order: Fabales
- Family: Fabaceae
- Subfamily: Faboideae
- Genus: Lotus
- Species: L. loweanus

Binomial name
- Lotus loweanus Webb & Berthel.

Synonyms
- Pedrosia loweana (Webb & Berthel.) Lowe (1862); Pedrosia porto-sanctana Lowe (1856)

Plant species in the pea family

Lotus loweanus is a species of plant in the pea family, Fabaceae, which grows on the island of Porto Santo in the Atlantic Ocean.

== Description ==
Lotus loweanus is a ground hugging, prostrate plant with stems that are 15–46 centimetres (6–18 in) long. The plant has numerous narrow leaves covered in silvery, silky hairs. The flowers are a dark purple, almost black in color.

== Taxonomy ==
Lotus loweanus was scientifically described and named by Sabin Berthelot and Philip Barker-Webb in the book L'Histoire Naturelle des Îles Canaries in 1842. It was collected by Richard Thomas Lowe together with Webb in 1828.

== Range and habitat ==
Lotus loweanus is endemic to the island of Porto Santo Island in the archipelago of Madeira. It grows on rocky slopes or hillsides near the ocean.
