= Lotus lalambensis =

Scientific classification
- Kingdom: Plantae
- Clade: Tracheophytes
- Clade: Angiosperms
- Clade: Eudicots
- Clade: Rosids
- Order: Fabales
- Family: Fabaceae
- Subfamily: Faboideae
- Genus: Lotus
- Species: L. lalambensis

Binomial name
- Lotus lalambensis Schweinf.

Species of plant

Lotus lalambensis is a plant in the genus Lotus ranging from Sinai to E. Ethiopia and the Arabian Peninsula.

== Description ==
This species is a trailing groundcover, with yellow clustered pea-like flowers. the leaves are narrow ovals, in clusters of 3.

== Medical uses ==
This species can be help with inhibition of Candida albicans when extracted correctly.
