= Lotus alianus =

Scientific classification
- Kingdom: Plantae
- Clade: Tracheophytes
- Clade: Angiosperms
- Clade: Eudicots
- Clade: Rosids
- Order: Fabales
- Family: Fabaceae
- Subfamily: Faboideae
- Genus: Lotus
- Species: L. alianus

Binomial name
- Lotus alianus J.H.Kirkbr.

Species of plant

Lotus alianus is a rare plant from the genus Lotus endemic to Cabo Verde, West Africa. It is identified by its small seed pods and very long leaves. The leaves and stems are antrorsely strigose, supported by a strong taproot.

The flowers of Lotus alianus are small and flattened, with 2mm long wing shaped petals. The flowers have a small joined, base with small, spaced out hairs.

This species is one of many endemic Lotus species discovered in this area. It is only found on two of the islands, Ilhas de Santo Antão and São Vicente.
