= Lotus laricus =

Scientific classification
- Kingdom: Plantae
- Clade: Tracheophytes
- Clade: Angiosperms
- Clade: Eudicots
- Clade: Rosids
- Order: Fabales
- Family: Fabaceae
- Subfamily: Faboideae
- Genus: Lotus
- Species: L. laricus

Binomial name
- Lotus laricus Rech.f., Aellen & Esfand.

Species of plant

Lotus laricus is a plant native to Iran, Oman, Pakistan in the genus Lotus. It is an upright perennial to a trailing annual.

== Identification and records ==
There are only two records of this species recorded by the GBIF.

The flowers are a dark orange and the leaves are small, oval and hairless. The flowers are single spaced.

The NRL for the UAE shows only one record. The habitat of this species is most likely irrigated or disturbed habitats.
