= Lotus arabicus =

Scientific classification
- Kingdom: Plantae
- Clade: Tracheophytes
- Clade: Angiosperms
- Clade: Eudicots
- Clade: Rosids
- Order: Fabales
- Family: Fabaceae
- Subfamily: Faboideae
- Genus: Lotus
- Species: L. arabicus

Binomial name
- Lotus arabicus Sol. ex L.

Species of plant

Lotus arabicus or Arabian Lotus is a plant in the genus Lotus native to Africa, the Arabian Peninsula, and India.

== Description ==
This plant is identified by its hairless leaves and stems, and pink flowers. The leaves of this plant are semi folded occasionally.

== Habitat ==
This plant is found in desert and sandy soil as well as the banks of the Nile.

== Toxicity ==
This plant is highly poisonous to livestock including goats and horses.

== Conservation status and lifecycle ==
This plant is not threatened and annual.
