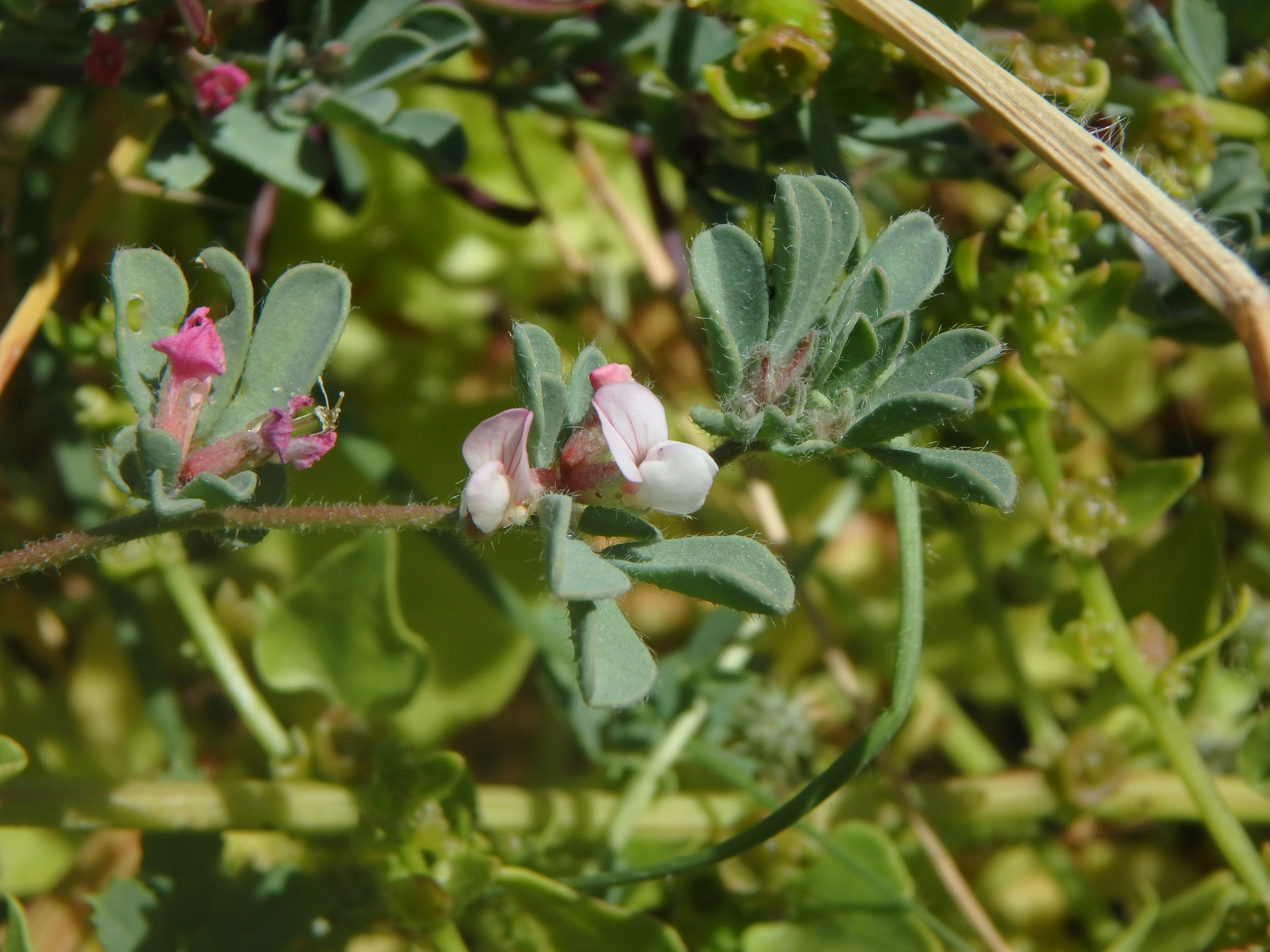

Scientific classification
- Kingdom: Plantae
- Clade: Tracheophytes
- Clade: Angiosperms
- Clade: Eudicots
- Clade: Rosids
- Order: Fabales
- Family: Fabaceae
- Subfamily: Faboideae
- Genus: Lotus
- Species: L. glinoides

Binomial name
- Lotus glinoides Delile 1837

Synonyms
- Synonymy: Lotus ehrenbergii Vierh.

= Lotus glinoides =

Species of legume

Lotus glinoides is a dwarf annual with retuse leaflets and pinkish purple flowers. It can be found in the Canary Islands, Cape Verde and from North Africa to Pakistan.
