= Lotus campylocladus =

Scientific classification
- Kingdom: Plantae
- Clade: Tracheophytes
- Clade: Angiosperms
- Clade: Eudicots
- Clade: Rosids
- Order: Fabales
- Family: Fabaceae
- Subfamily: Faboideae
- Genus: Lotus
- Species: L. campylocladus

Binomial name
- Lotus campylocladus Webb & Berthel.

Species of plant

Lotus campylocladus is a plant in the genus Lotus endemic to the Canary Islands.

== Description ==
This species is identified from its very hairy leaves with three to six lobed, in a subshrub to shrub form.

== Subspecies ==
This species has two subspecies:

- Lotus campylocladus subsp. campylocladus found in the Canary Islands
- Lotus campylocladus subsp. hillebrandii a shrubbier from, found in El Hierro and La Palma only
