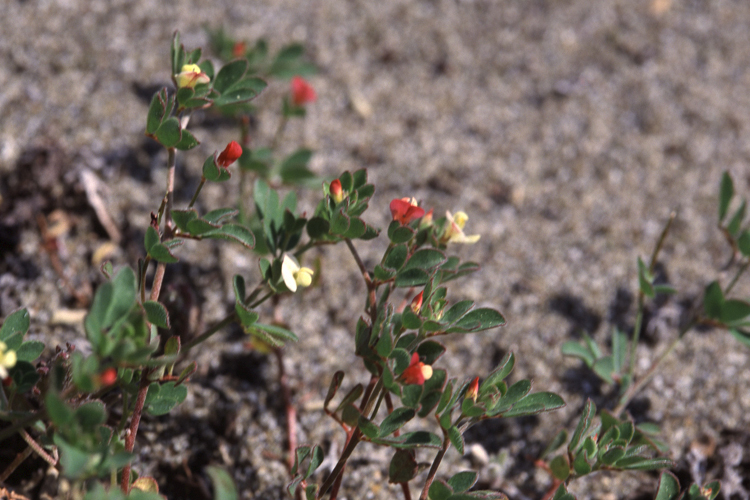

Conservation status
- Secure (NatureServe)

Scientific classification
- Kingdom: Plantae
- Clade: Tracheophytes
- Clade: Angiosperms
- Clade: Eudicots
- Clade: Rosids
- Order: Fabales
- Family: Fabaceae
- Subfamily: Faboideae
- Genus: Acmispon
- Species: A. parviflorus

Binomial name
- Acmispon parviflorus (Benth.) D.D.Sokoloff

Synonyms
- Anisolotus parviflorus (Benth.) A.Heller; Hosackia microphylla Nutt.; Hosackia parviflora Benth.; Lotus micranthus (Benth.) Benth.

= Acmispon parviflorus =

Species of legume

Acmispon parviflorus, synonym Lotus micranthus, is a species of legume. It is known by the common name desert deervetch. It is native to western North America from British Columbia to southern California, where it is known from many types of habitat. It is a hairy to hairless annual herb lined with leaves each made up of small oval leaflets. Solitary flowers appear in the leaf axils. Each is an ephemeral pinkish pealike bloom under a centimeter long. The fruit is a narrow, hairless, wavy-edged legume pod up to about 2.5 centimeters long.
