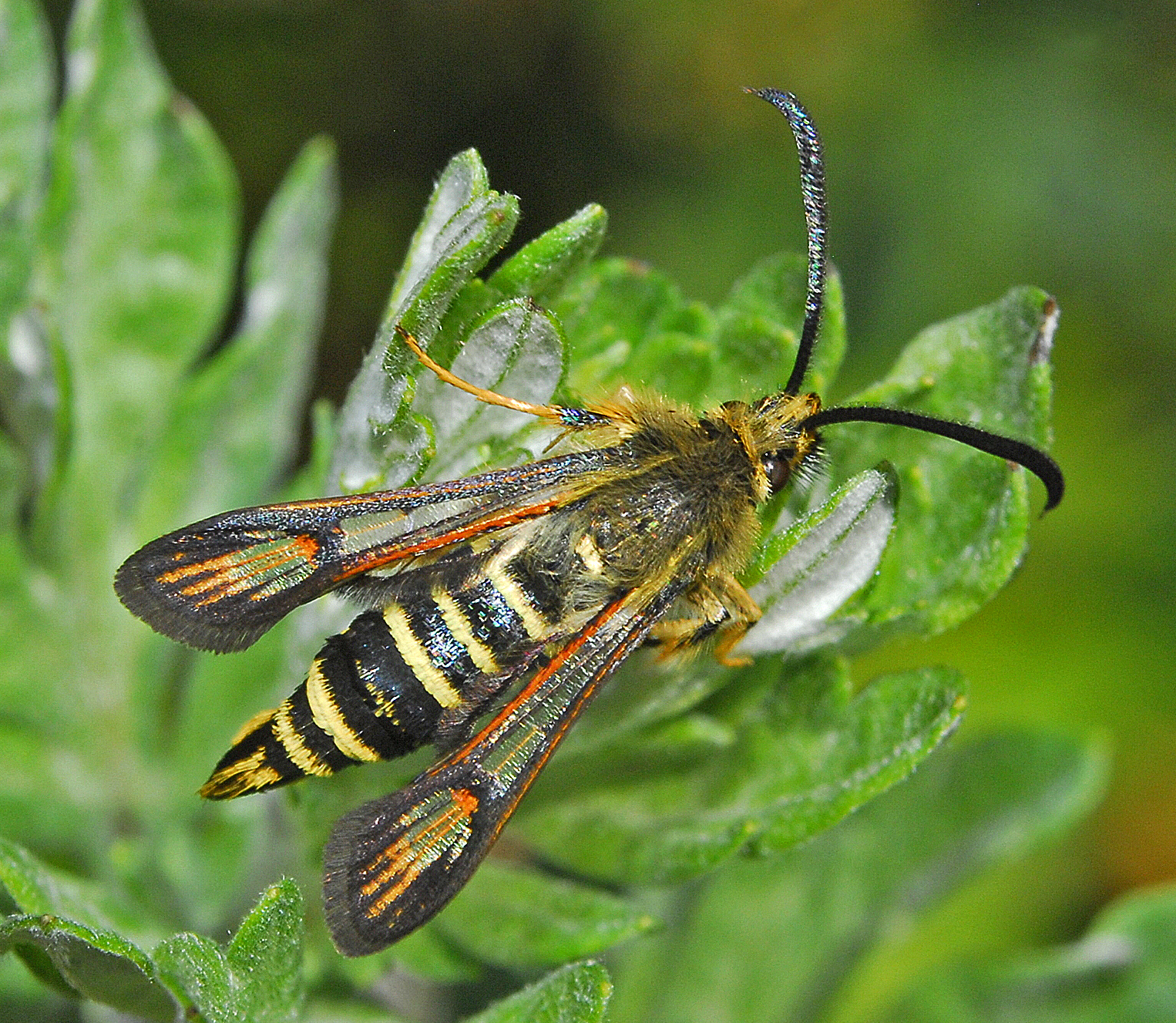
- Bembecia ichneumoniformis. Male
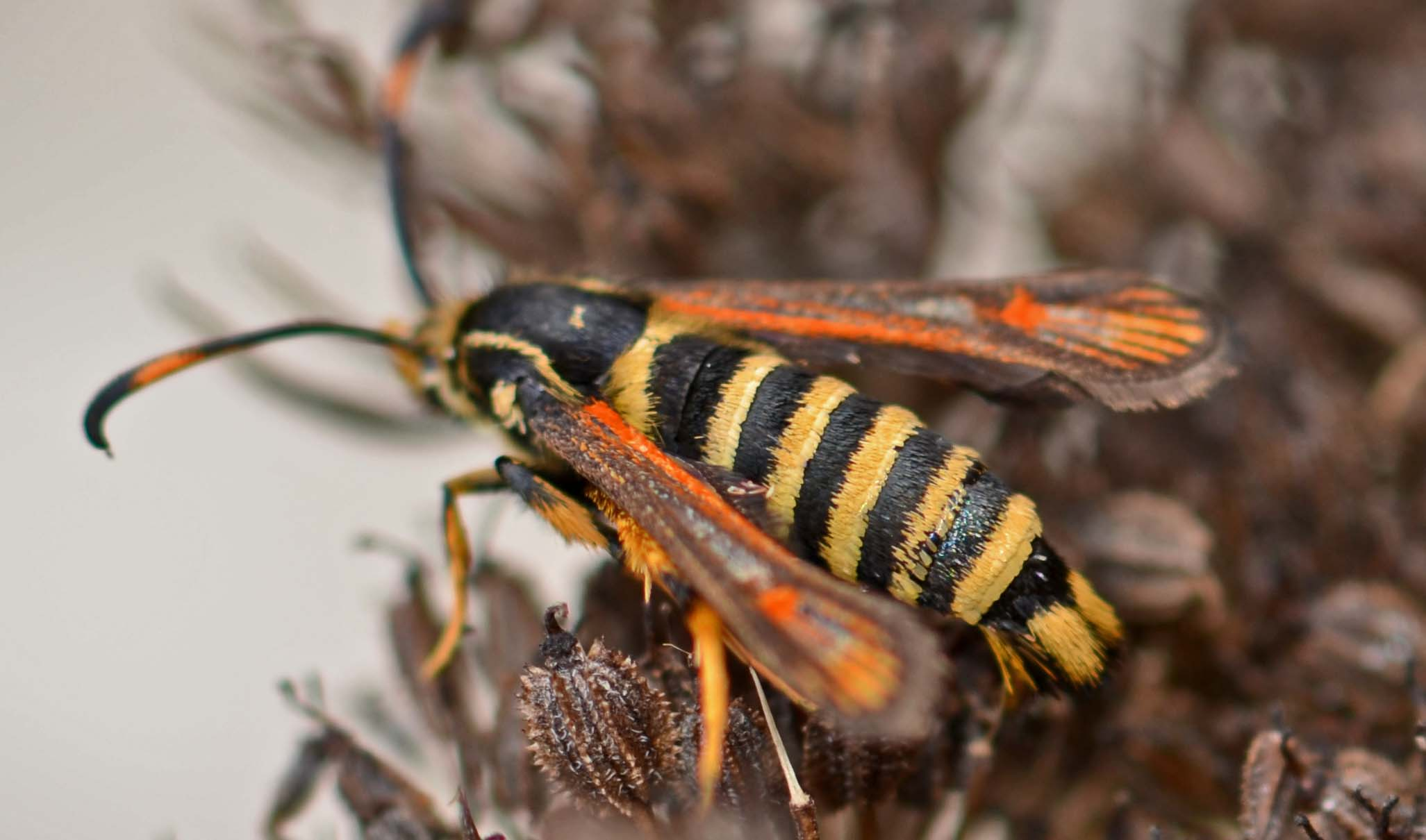
- Female

Scientific classification
- Domain: Eukaryota
- Kingdom: Animalia
- Phylum: Arthropoda
- Class: Insecta
- Order: Lepidoptera
- Family: Sesiidae
- Genus: Bembecia
- Species: B. ichneumoniformis

Binomial name
- Bembecia ichneumoniformis ([Denis & Schiffermüller], 1775)

Synonyms
- List: Sphinx ichneumoniformis Denis & Schiffermüller, 1775; Aegeria ichneumoniformis; Sphinx vespiformis Hübner, 1796 (nec Linnaeus, 1761); Sphinx systrophaeformis Hübner, [1813]; Sphinx rhagioniformis Hübner, [1806]; Sesia palpina Dalman, 1816; Sesia statuiformis Freyer, 1836; Aegeria cryptiformis Walker, 1856; Sesia albanica Rebel, 1910; Bembecia scopigera (auct. non Scopoli, 1763)

= Bembecia ichneumoniformis =

Species of moth

Bembecia ichneumoniformis, the six-belted clearwing, is a moth of the family Sesiidae.

== Distribution ==
This species can be found in most of Europe and Asia Minor, the Caucasus, northern Iran and the Near East.

== Habitat ==
Bembecia ichneumoniformis prefers calcareous soils, sea-cliffs and quarries.

== Description ==
The wingspan of Bembecia ichneumoniformis can reach 15–21 millimetres (0.59–0.83 in). The body of these moths is black, with six yellow narrow transversal bands in males (hence the common name), while the females may have only five yellow bands. The antennae of this insect are relatively thick. In males, they are typically black. In females, the antennae can be either black with an ocher (yellowish-brown) band or predominantly ocher with a black tip. The forewings exhibit a distinct pattern: a yellowish or orange apex, a yellow-orange spot that separates two transparent areas, and brownish-orange margins. A key feature is the abdominal brush, which is black with yellow lines. The legs are yellow.

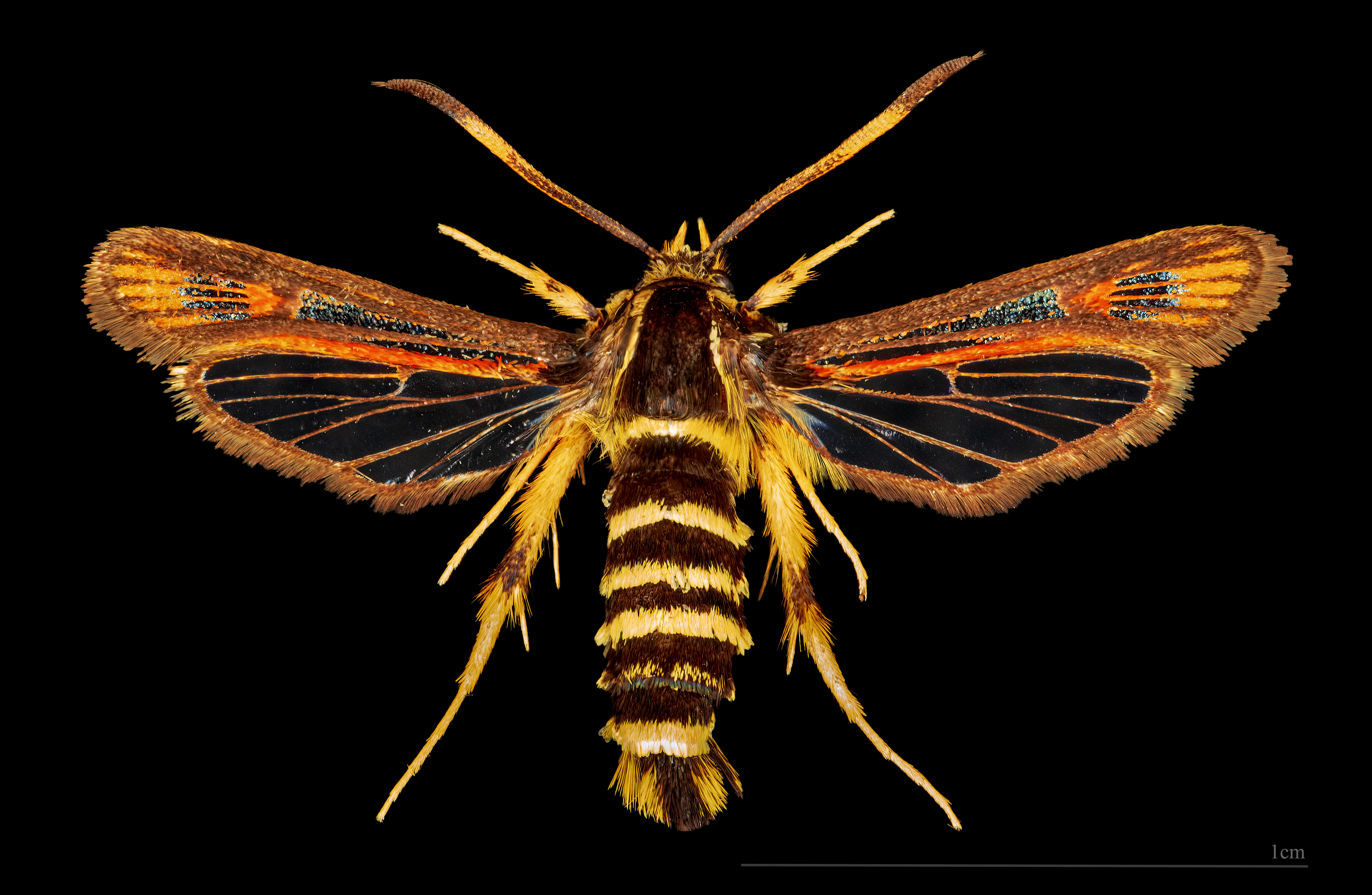
♂

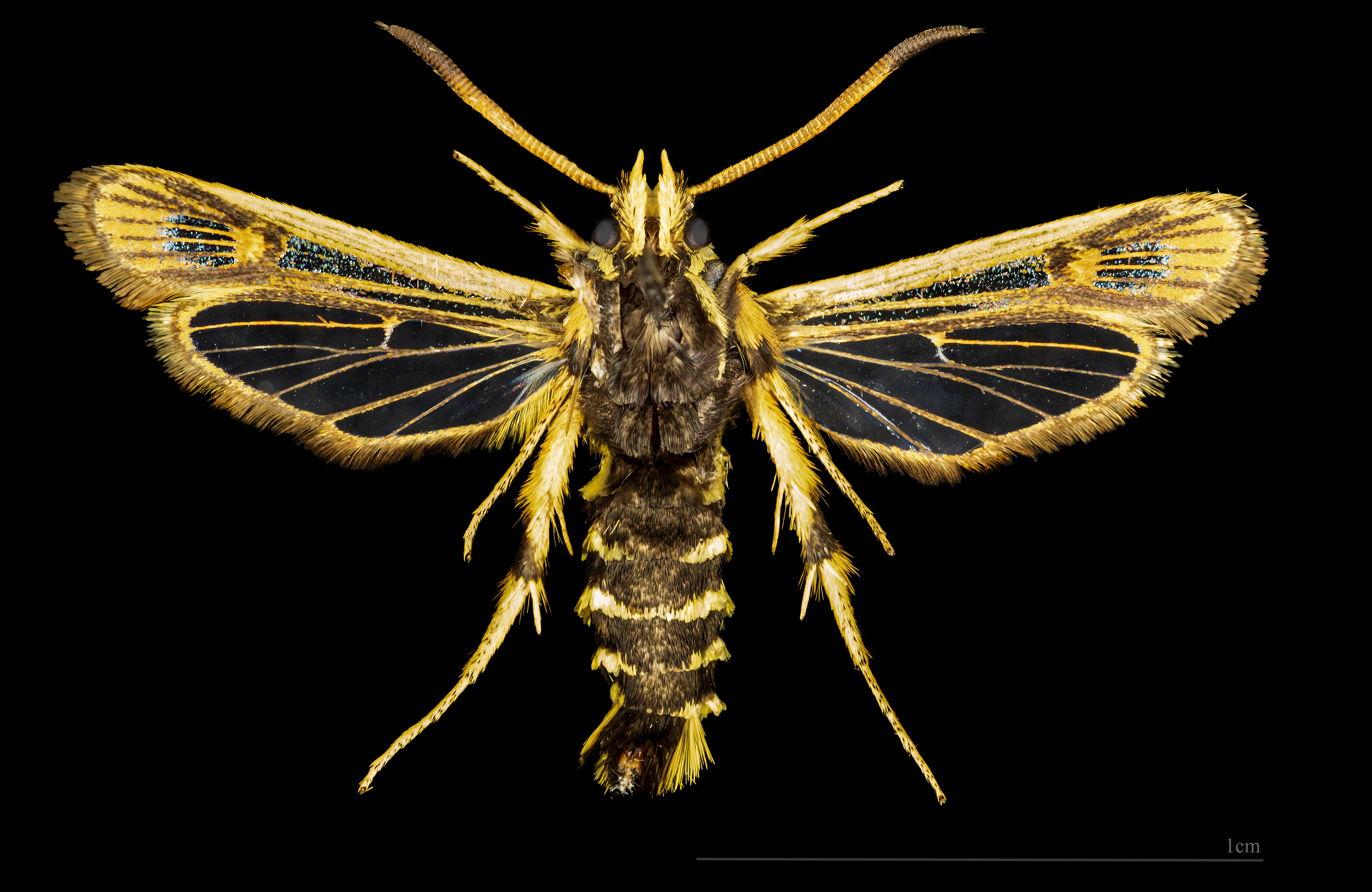
♂ △

Pyropteron muscaeformis, Bembecia scopigera and Bembecia albanensis are examples of rather similar species. In general, there is a great similarity to other Bembecia species:

The males of Bembecia albanensis lack the inward point on the discal spot of the forewings, and the discal spot of the hindwings is yellowish in color. In the females, the anal brush is always monochromatic yellow.

Bembecia megillaeformis has only three yellow rings on the abdomen in males and four in females.

Bembecia uroceriformis is distinguished by the always monochromatic yellow brush.

Bembecia illustris shows an overall lighter appearance.

Since the external distinguishing features in the aforementioned species from Bembecia ichneumoniformis are small, a reliable determination should be made by specialists, and a genital morphological analysis is also advisable for clear assignment.

Like all the moths of the family Sesiidae, this species is similar in appearance and flight to a hymenopteran more than to a lepidopteran. The wings are partially free of scales (transparent areas) and narrower and more elongated than those of other butterfly families. In fact the Latin name ichneumoniformis means that its shape and colors, as well as the structure of its wings, evokes certain ichneumonids, not a butterfly.

It is likely that the alternating yellow and black bands protect this species from predators that associate these colors with those of insects with darts and venom such as wasps and bees.

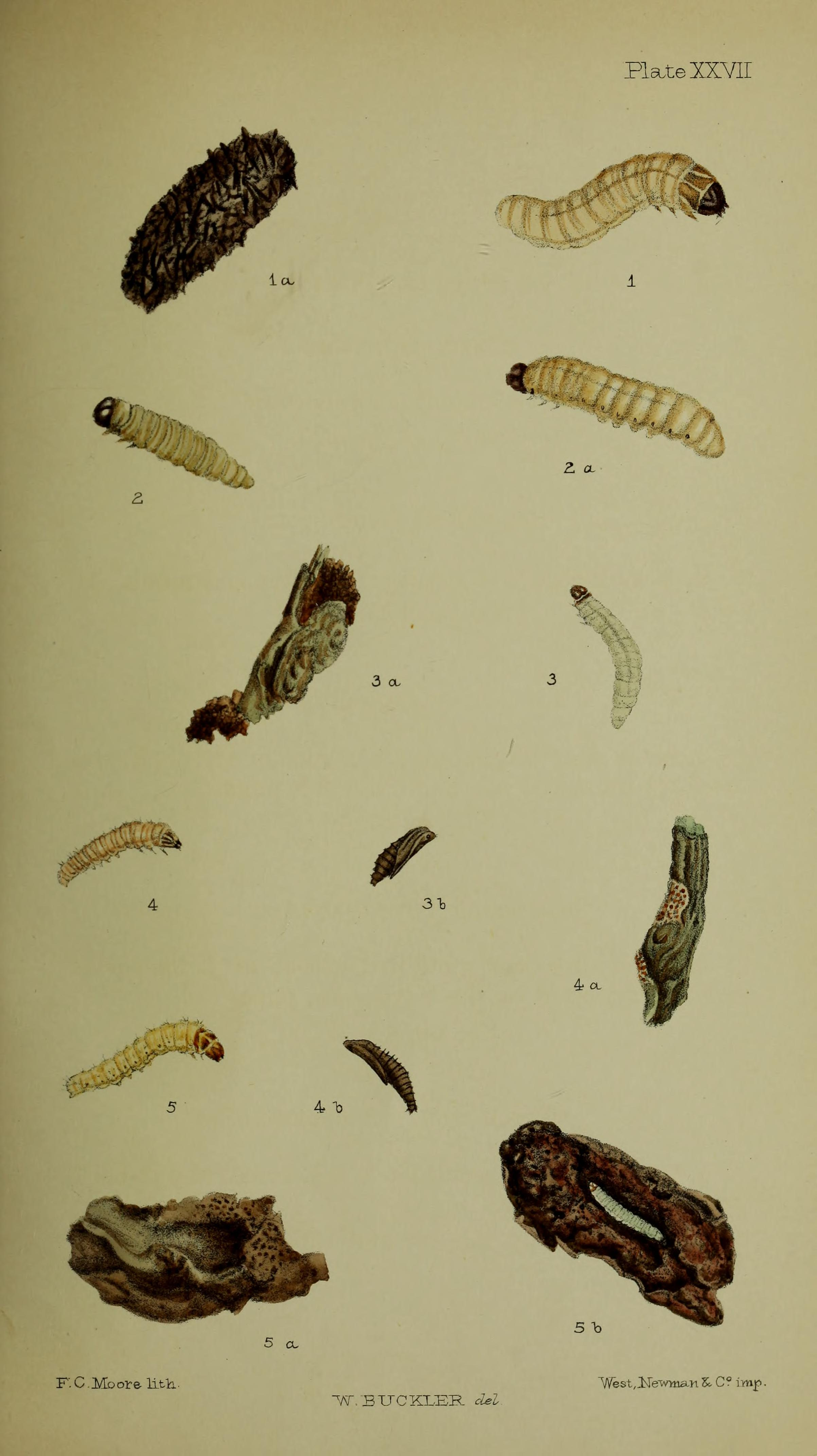
Figs. 4 larvae after last moult 4a root of Lotus corniculatus inhabited by the larva 4b pupa

== Biology ==
Adults are on wing from June to August in western Europe. It is a day-flying species.

The larvae feed on the roots of Lotus species and Anthyllis vulneraria. Other recorded food plants include Lotus corniculatus, Ononis spinosa, Dorycnium pentaphyllum, Dorycnium germanicum, Dorycnium herbaceum, Dorycnium hirsutum, Medicago, Hippocrepis comosa, Lupinus polyphyllus, Tetragonolobus maritimus and Lathyrus pratensis.

The caterpillar may be parasitized by other insects, particularly by Tachinidae species (especially Bithia demotica and Bithia proletaria, Bithia glirina and Leskia aurea).

Males are attracted by certain molecules, some of which also attract other species of butterflies (Tineidae et Choreutidae).

== Gallery ==
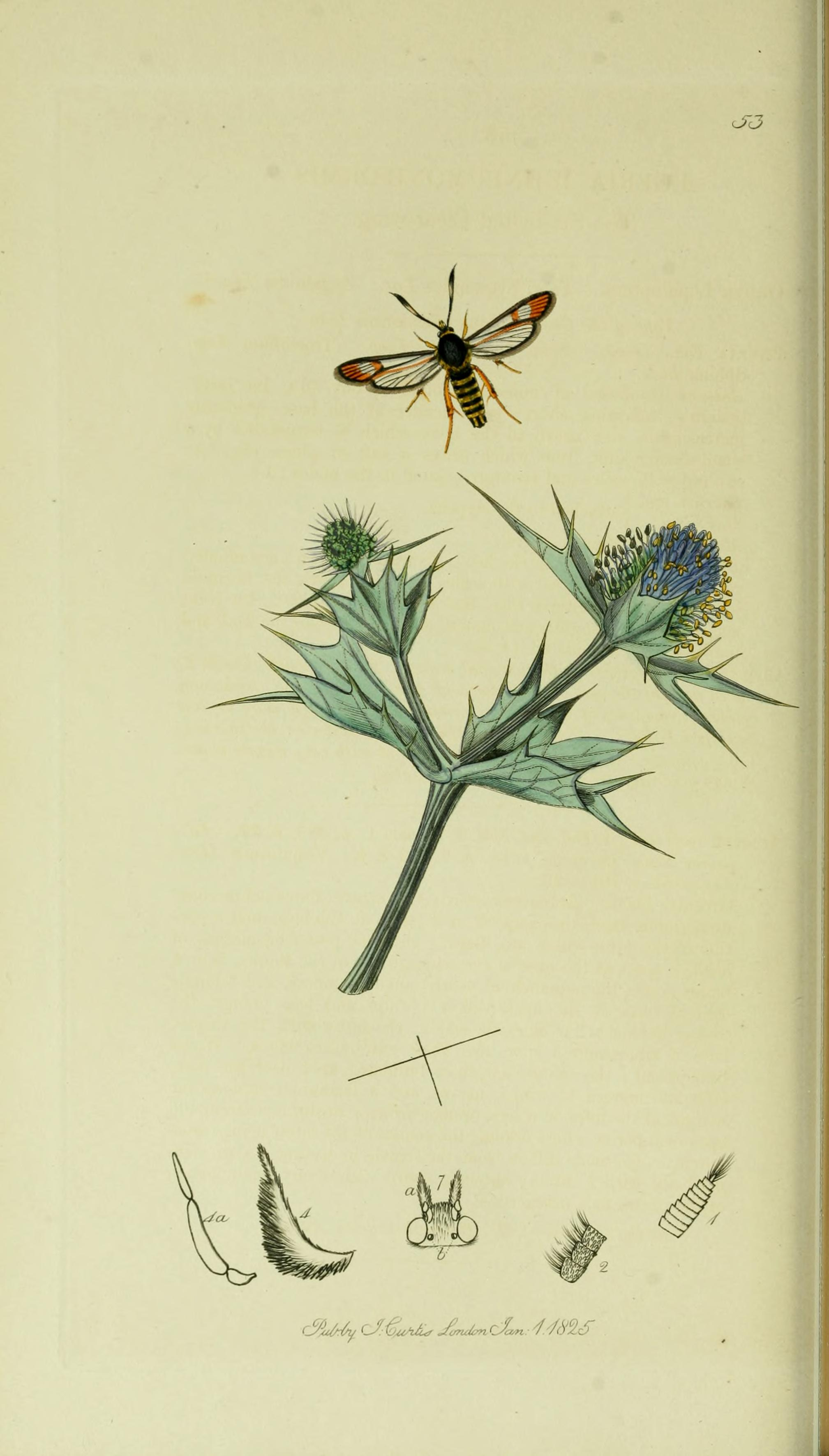
Illustration from John Curtis's British Entomology Volume 5

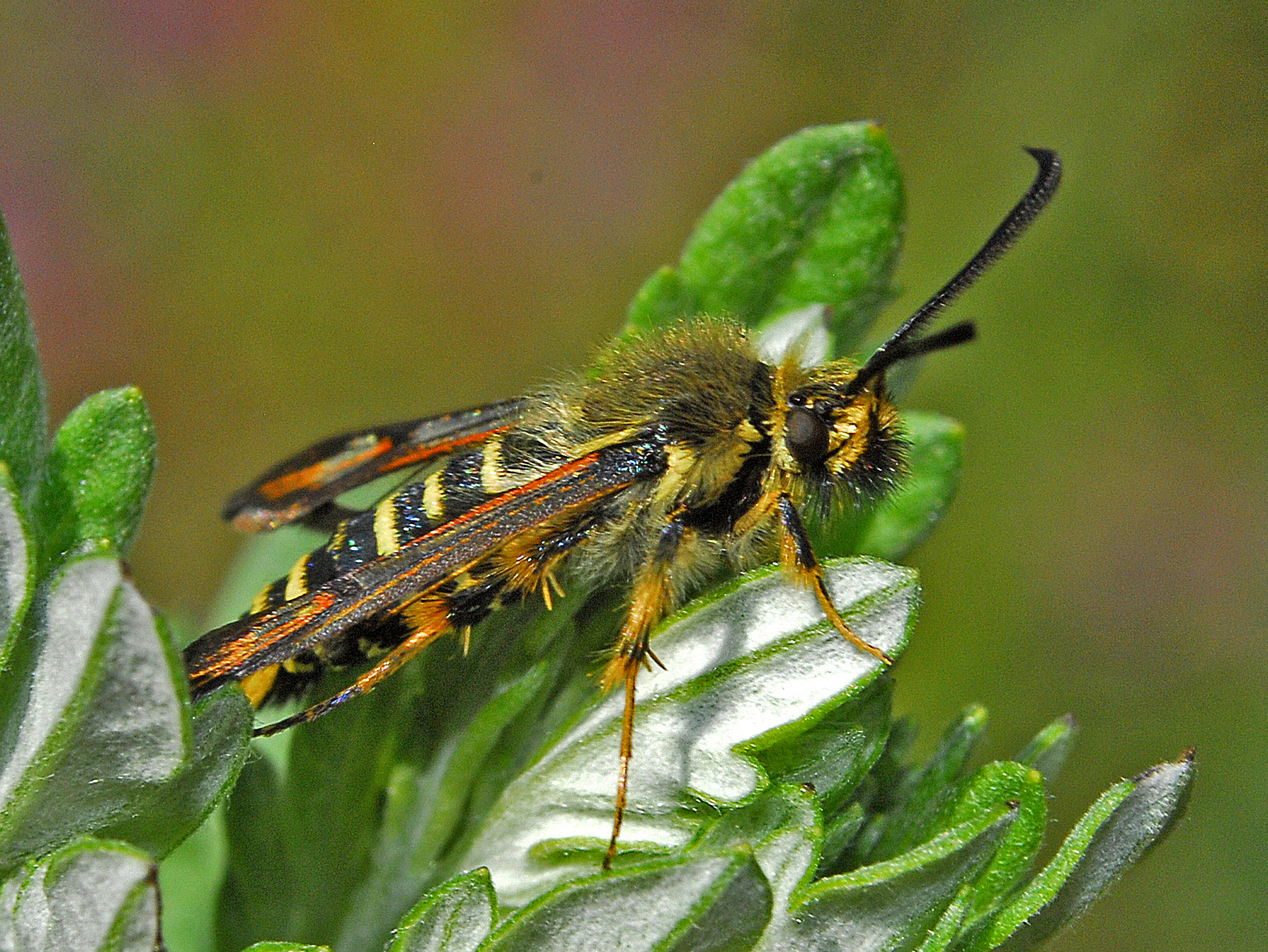
Bembecia ichneumoniformis. Male, side view

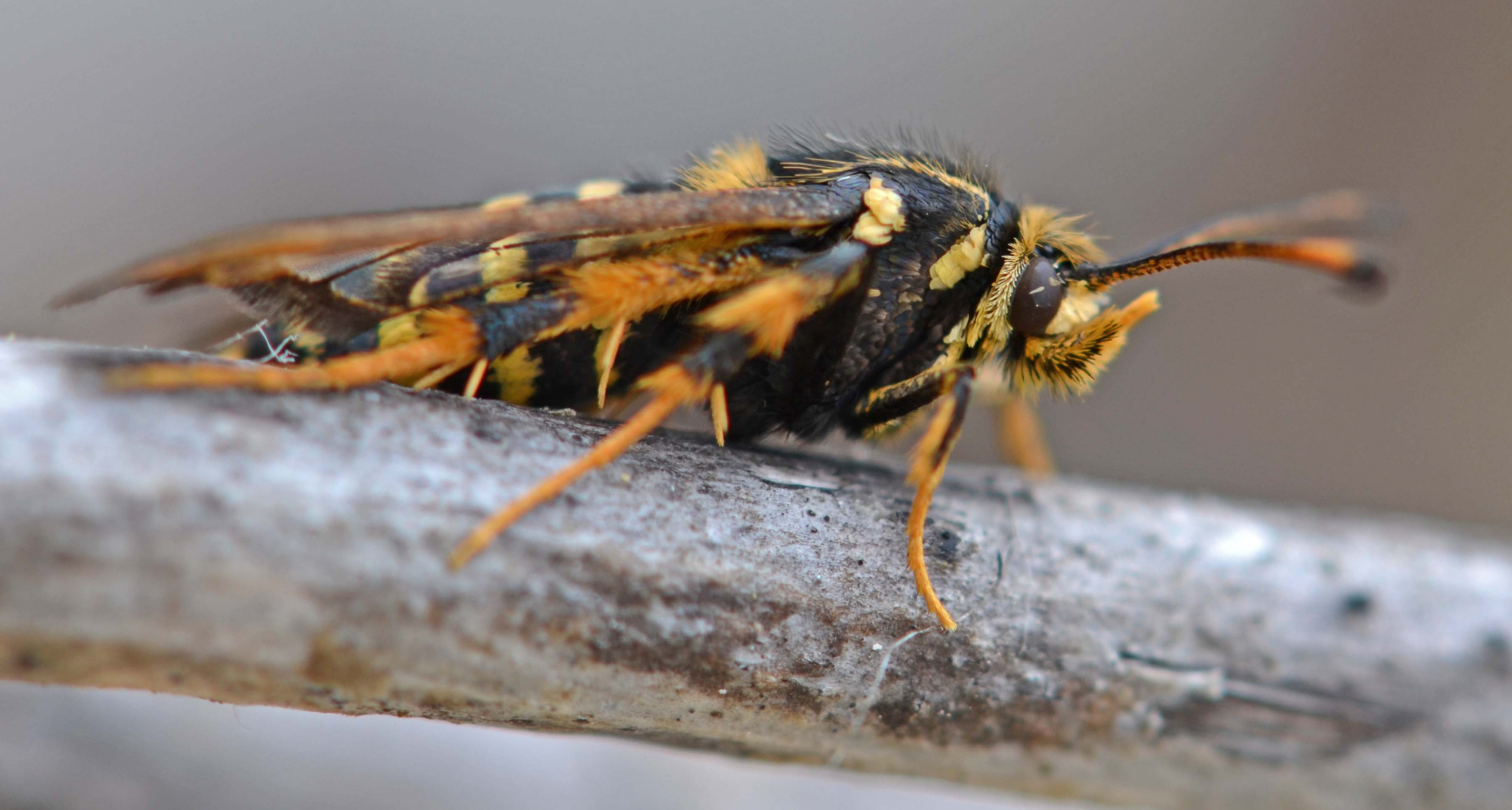
Female, side view

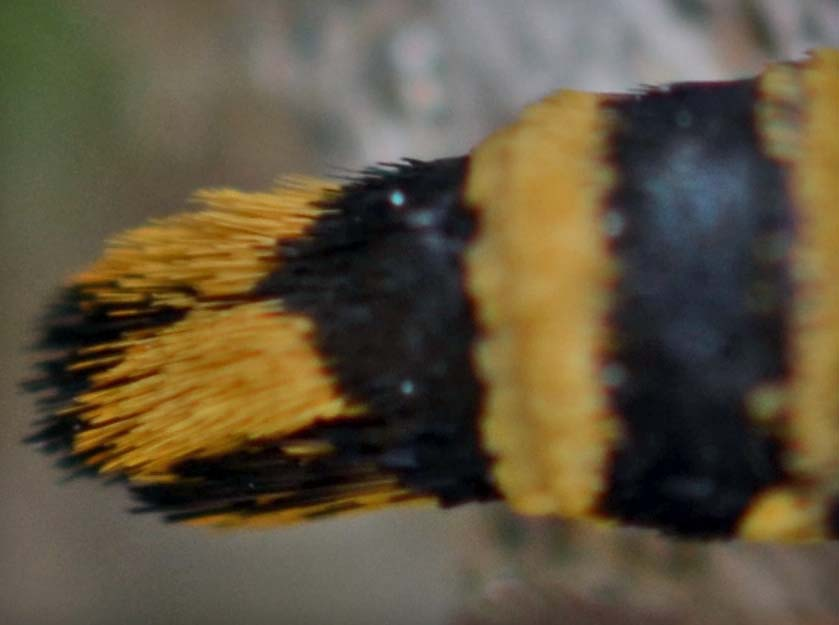
Close-up on abdominal brush

== Bibliography ==
- Jackie A. McKern, Allen L. Szalanski, Donn T. Johnson, and Ashley P. G. Dowling, Molecular Phylogeny of Sesiidae (Lepidoptera) Inferred From Mitochondrial DNA Sequences; J. Agric. Urban Entomol. 25(3): 165–177 (July 2008)
- B Verdcourt, Additions to the Wild Fauna and Flora of the Royal Botanic Gardens, Kew XXXV. Miscellaneous Records - Kew Bulletin, 2004 - (Lien vers JSTOR)
