= Trifurcula eurema =

Scientific classification
- Kingdom: Animalia
- Phylum: Arthropoda
- Class: Insecta
- Order: Lepidoptera
- Family: Nepticulidae
- Genus: Trifurcula
- Species: T. eurema

Binomial name
- Trifurcula eurema (Tutt, 1899)

Synonyms
- Nepticula eurema Tutt, 1899; Nepticula dorycniella Suire, 1928; Nepticula gozmányi Szőcs, 1959; Levarchama eurema; Stigmella eurema

Species of moth

Trifurcula eurema is a moth of the family Nepticulidae. It is widespread throughout Europe, northwards to southern Norway and Sweden (but not in Finland), Poland and the Baltic Region. It is also found in the Mediterranean region, including the larger Mediterranean islands, east to Bulgaria, Asiatic Turkey and Ukraine.

The wingspan is 4.5–7 mm.The head is orange, the collar light orange, the eyecaps are yellowish-white. The antennae are greyish-brown, just over half the forewing length. The forewings with large scales, greyish-brown with occasional white scales, distad to the middle with a pale transverse band (often broken). In the female the band may consist of two pale spots. The hindwings are grey, in the male with a velvety patch of scent scales on the underside and a long white hair brush.

The larvae feed on Dorycnium hirsutum, Dorycnium pentaphyllum, Dorycnium rectum, Lotus corniculatus, Lotus cytisoides, Lotus ornithopodoides, Lotus pedunculatus, Lotus uliginosus and Tetragonolobus maritimus. They mine the leaves of their host plant.
