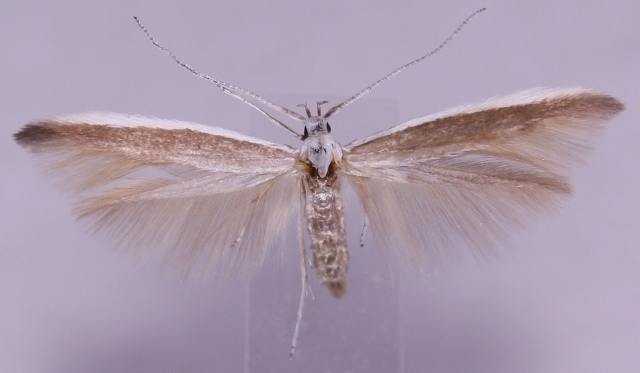

Scientific classification
- Kingdom: Animalia
- Phylum: Arthropoda
- Class: Insecta
- Order: Lepidoptera
- Family: Coleophoridae
- Genus: Coleophora
- Species: C. acrisella

Binomial name
- Coleophora acrisella Milliere, 1872

= Coleophora acrisella =

Species of moth

Coleophora acrisella is a moth of the family Coleophoridae. It is found from the Czech Republic to the Iberian Peninsula, Italy and Greece and from France to Hungary.

The wingspan is about 12 mm.

The larvae feed on Dorycnium hirsutum and Dorycnium pentaphyllum (including Dorycnium pentaphyllum germanicum). They mine the leaves of their host plant.
