= Coleophora congeriella =

Scientific classification
- Kingdom: Animalia
- Phylum: Arthropoda
- Class: Insecta
- Order: Lepidoptera
- Family: Coleophoridae
- Genus: Coleophora
- Species: C. congeriella

Binomial name
- Coleophora congeriella Staudinger, 1859

Synonyms
- Coleophora suboriolella Toll, 1944

Species of moth

Coleophora congeriella is a moth of the family Coleophoridae. It is found from the Czech Republic and Slovakia to the Iberian Peninsula, Italy and Greece and from France to Bulgaria.

The larvae feed on Dorycnium hirsutum, Dorycnium pentaphyllum and Dorycnium pentaphyllum germanicum. Larvae can be found from August to April.
