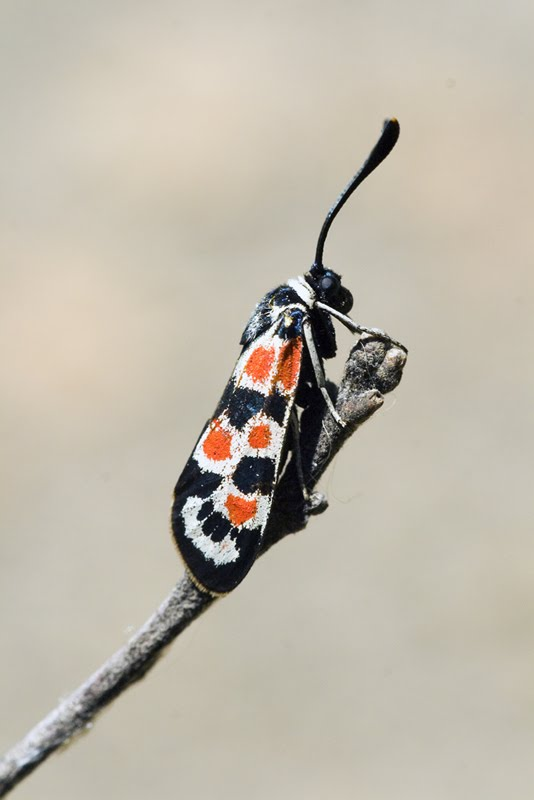

Scientific classification
- Domain: Eukaryota
- Kingdom: Animalia
- Phylum: Arthropoda
- Class: Insecta
- Order: Lepidoptera
- Family: Zygaenidae
- Genus: Zygaena
- Species: Z. occitanica

Binomial name
- Zygaena occitanica (Villers, 1789)

Synonyms
- Sphinx occitanica Villers, 1789; Zygaena valenciaca Reiss, 1965; Zygaena tourrettica Reiss, 1953; Zygaena azurensis Reiss, 1958; Zygaena albicans Reiss, 1965; Zygaena albicans Staudinger, 1861; Zygaena albipunctata Vartian, 1960

= Zygaena occitanica =

Species of moth

Zygaena occitanica, the Provence burnet, is a moth of the Zygaenidae family. It is found from the Algarve and southern Spain up to the eastern parts of the Cantabrian Mountains then to southern Russia and the Caucasus and east to the western fringe of Central Asia.

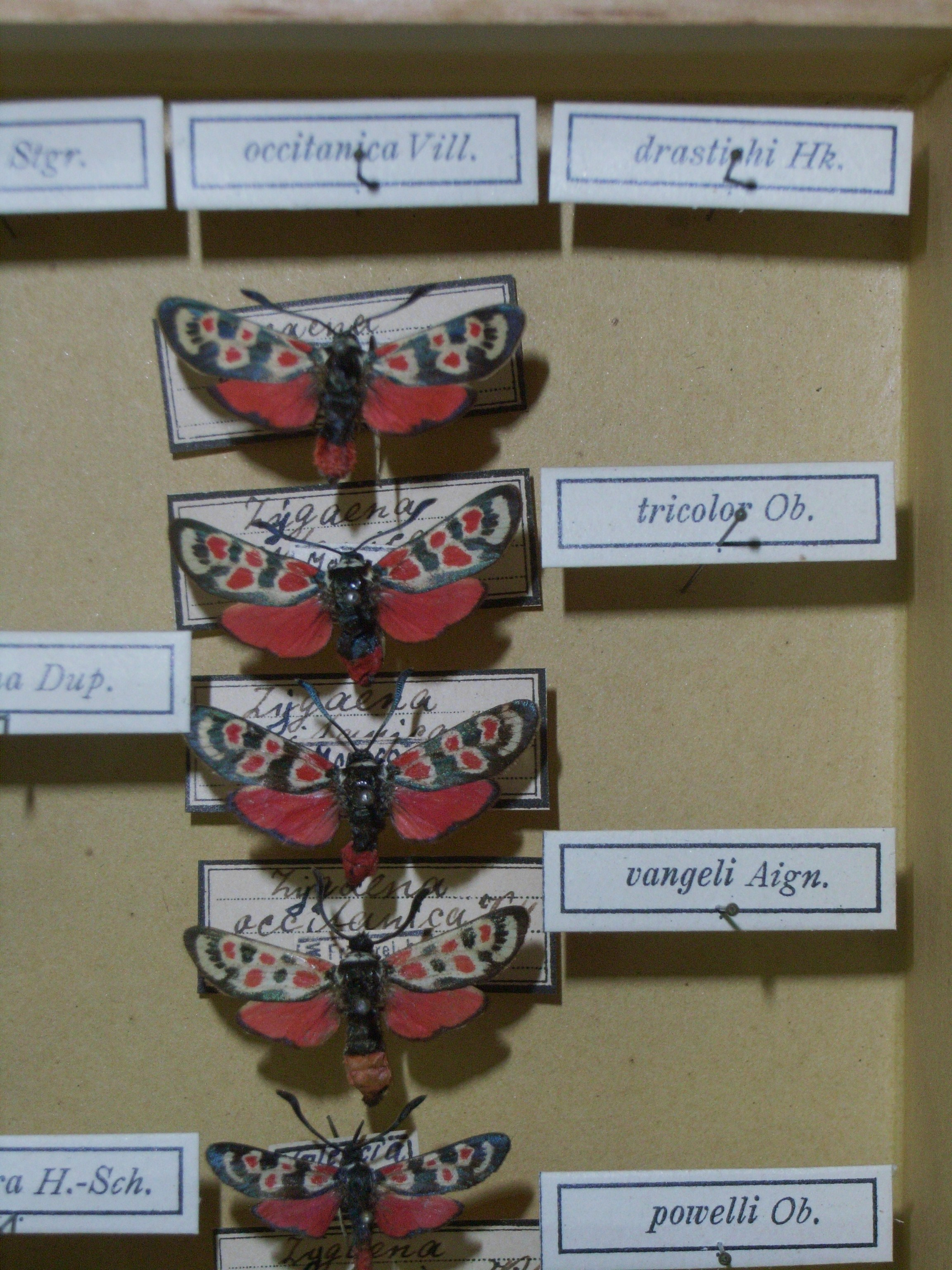

It is only the western representative of the carniolica series. Spot 6 is always pure white; the hindwing, moreover, is broadly edged with black and the abdomen is without a belt.albicans Staudinger has the forewing almost white, with red and some black spots, the white edge of the thorax being shining white and the abdomen posteriorly all red.— In iberica Stgr. [Z. occitanica ssp. arragonica Holik & Sheljuzhko, 1956 ] (8i) the 6 spot is reduced to a narrow white speck, the spots 1 - 5 of the forewing being very thinly edged with white; the ground-colour of the forewing black; the posterior half of the abdomen usually red; from Catalonia.If the abdominal belt is absent, which happens sometimes in the male, we have ab. azona Spuler [ ab. of Z. occitanica ssp. arragonica Holik & Sheljuzhko, 1956 ]. — ab. disjuncta Spuler is based on specimens of iberica in which the spots of the forewing are distinctly and widely separated. There exist almost all gradations between these forms, and by naming all of them the series of aberrations would be considerably enlarged. The wingspan is about 23 mm.

== Subspecies ==
- Zygaena occitanica occitanica
- Zygaena occitanica albarracinensis Reiss & Reiss, 1970
- Zygaena occitanica arragonica Holik & Sheljuzhko, 1956
- Zygaena occitanica burgosensis Tremewan, 1963
- Zygaena occitanica eulalia Burgeff, 1926
- Zygaena occitanica freudei Daniel, 1960
- Zygaena occitanica hedeae Eitschberger, 1973
- Zygaena occitanica huescacola Tremewan & Manley, 1965
- Zygaena occitanica praematura Przegendza, 1932
- Zygaena occitanica vandalitia Burgeff, 1926

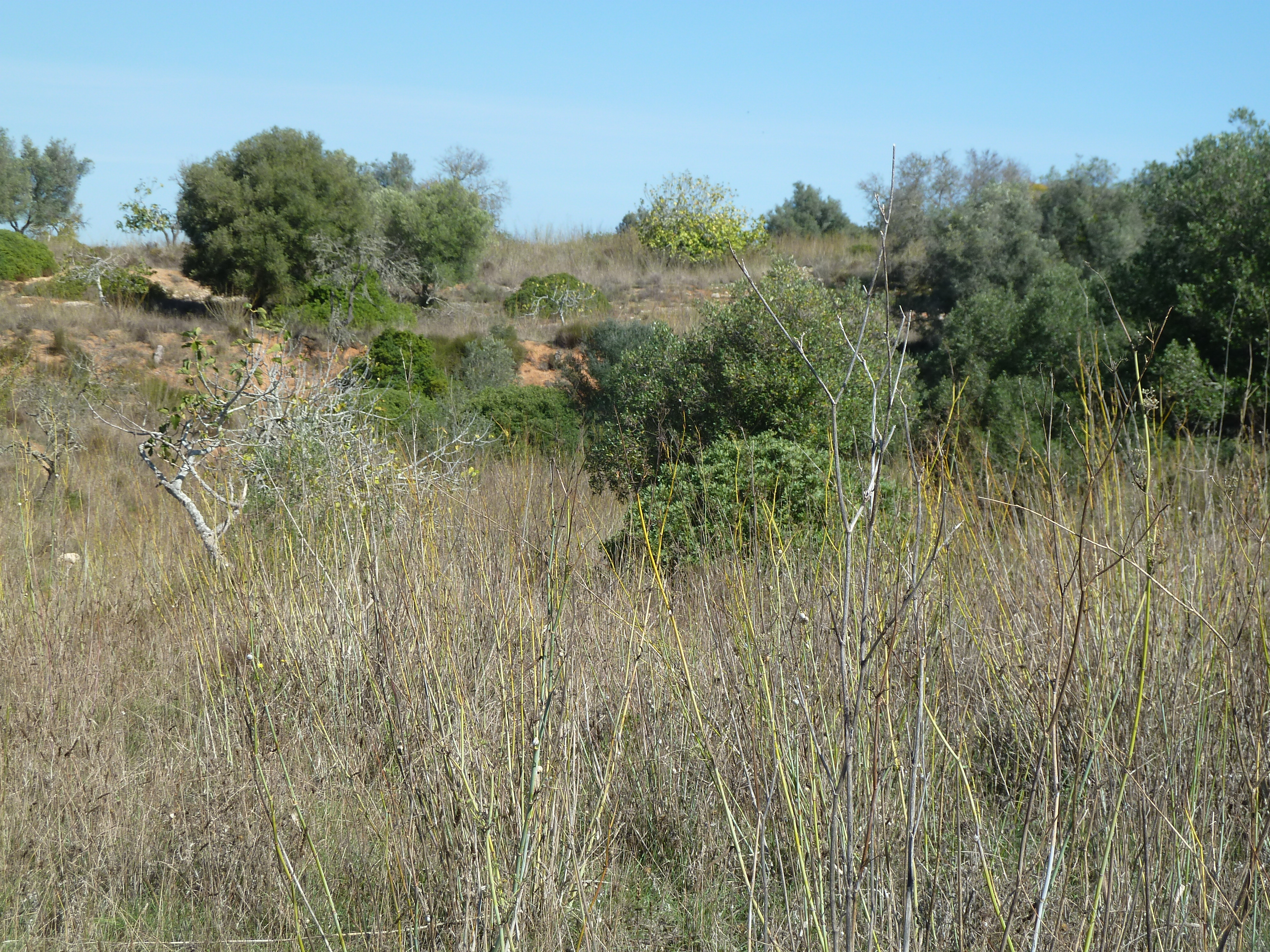
Habitat in Algarve

== Biology ==
The larva feeds on Fabaceae - Dorycnium pentaphyllum, Anthyllis cytisoides, Lotus creticus, Lotus longisiliquosus in maquis, garrigue, scrub, arid grasslands, mountain slopes, dry river gorges and very sparse woodland.
