= Leskia depilis =

Scientific classification
- Kingdom: Animalia
- Phylum: Arthropoda
- Class: Insecta
- Order: Diptera
- Family: Tachinidae
- Subfamily: Tachininae
- Tribe: Leskiini
- Genus: Leskia
- Species: L. depilis

Binomial name
- Leskia depilis (Coquillett, 1895)

Synonyms
- Leskiopalpus calidus Townsend, 1916; Myiobia depile Coquillett, 1895

Species of fly

Leskia depilis is a species of bristle fly in the family Tachinidae.

== Distribution ==
Canada, United States.
