= Leskia flavescens =

Scientific classification
- Kingdom: Animalia
- Phylum: Arthropoda
- Class: Insecta
- Order: Diptera
- Family: Tachinidae
- Subfamily: Tachininae
- Tribe: Leskiini
- Genus: Leskia
- Species: L. flavescens

Binomial name
- Leskia flavescens (Townsend, 1929)

Synonyms
- Leskiopalpus flavescens Townsend, 1929

Species of fly

Leskia flavescens is a species of bristle fly in the family Tachinidae.

== Distribution ==
Brazil.
