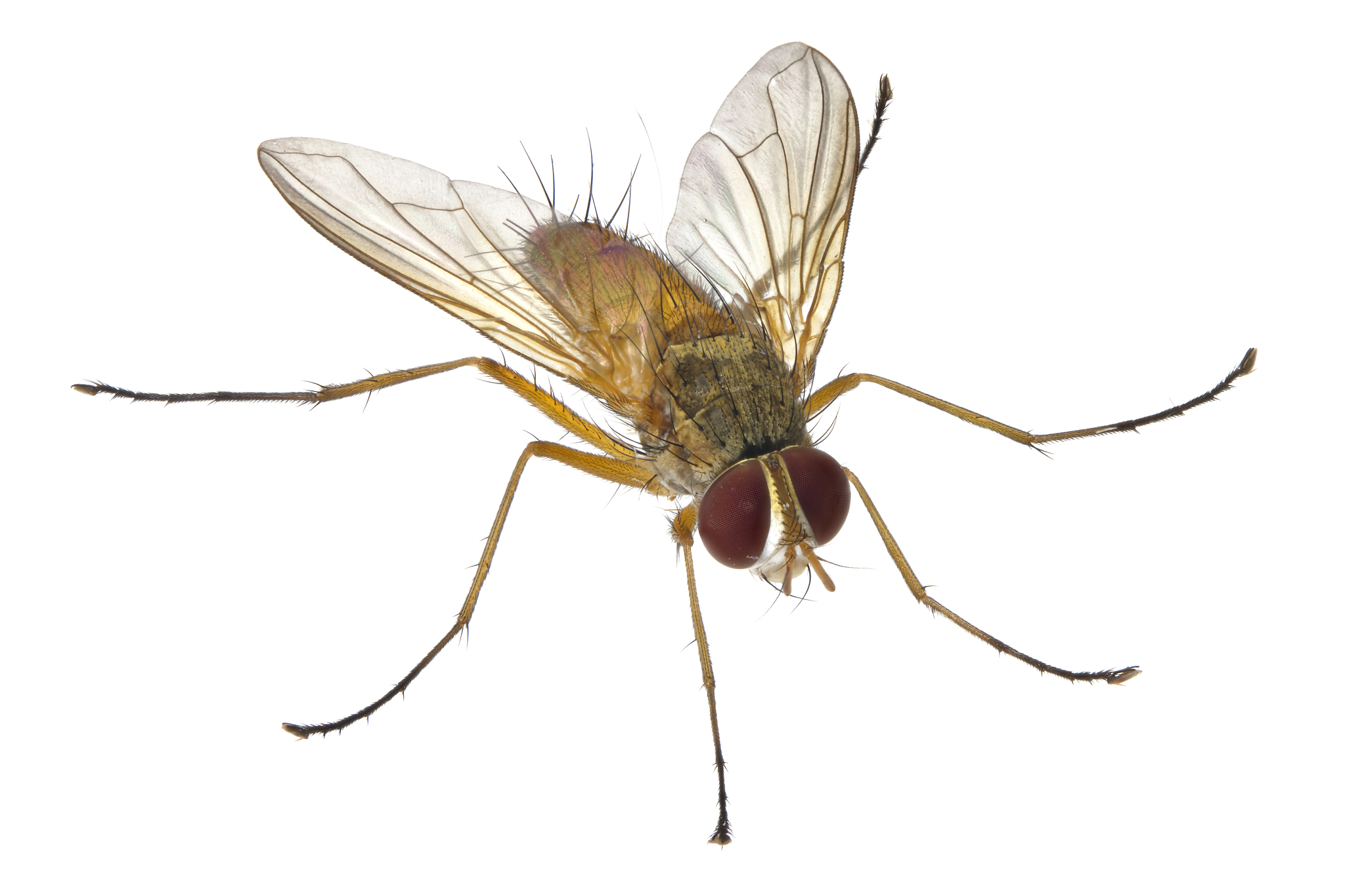

Scientific classification
- Kingdom: Animalia
- Phylum: Arthropoda
- Clade: Pancrustacea
- Class: Insecta
- Order: Diptera
- Family: Tachinidae
- Subfamily: Tachininae
- Tribe: Leskiini
- Genus: Leskia
- Species: L. similis

Binomial name
- Leskia similis (Townsend, 1916)

Synonyms
- Myobiopsis similis Townsend, 1916

= Leskia similis =

Species of fly

Leskia similis is a species of bristle fly in the family Tachinidae.

== Distribution ==
United States.
