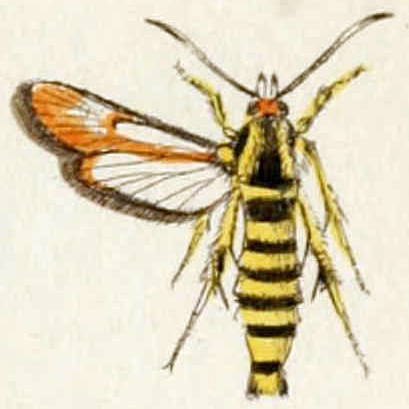

Scientific classification
- Domain: Eukaryota
- Kingdom: Animalia
- Phylum: Arthropoda
- Class: Insecta
- Order: Lepidoptera
- Family: Sesiidae
- Genus: Bembecia
- Species: B. uroceriformis

Binomial name
- Bembecia uroceriformis (Treitschke, 1834)

Synonyms
- Sesia uroceriformis Treitschke, 1834; Sesia mamertina Zeller, 1847; Dipsosphecia uroceriformis var. atlantica Le Cerf, 1920; Dipsosphecia uroceriformis var. nigricornis Mariani, 1937; Sesia uroceriformis var. athaliaeformis Boisduval, [1875]; Sesia odyneriformis Ghiliani, 1852 (nec Herrich-Schäffer, 1846); Bembecia uroceriformis f. subiti Tautel 2009; Sesia armoricana Oberthür, 1907

= Bembecia uroceriformis =

Species of moth

Bembecia uroceriformis is a moth of the family Sesiidae. It is found in France, Spain, Portugal, Switzerland, Italy and most of the Balkan Peninsula. It is also found in North Africa (including Morocco) and from Asia Minor to the Caucasus.

The wingspan is 20–24 mm.

The larvae feed on Dorycnium species (including Dorycnium herbaceum), Lotus corniculatus, Ulex europaeus, Ulex nanus, Coronilla emerus, Chamaecytisus species, Cytisus procumbens, Cytisus hirsutus and Corothamnus procumbens.

== Subspecies ==
- Bembecia uroceriformis uroceriformis
- Bembecia uroceriformis armoricana (Oberthür, 1907)
