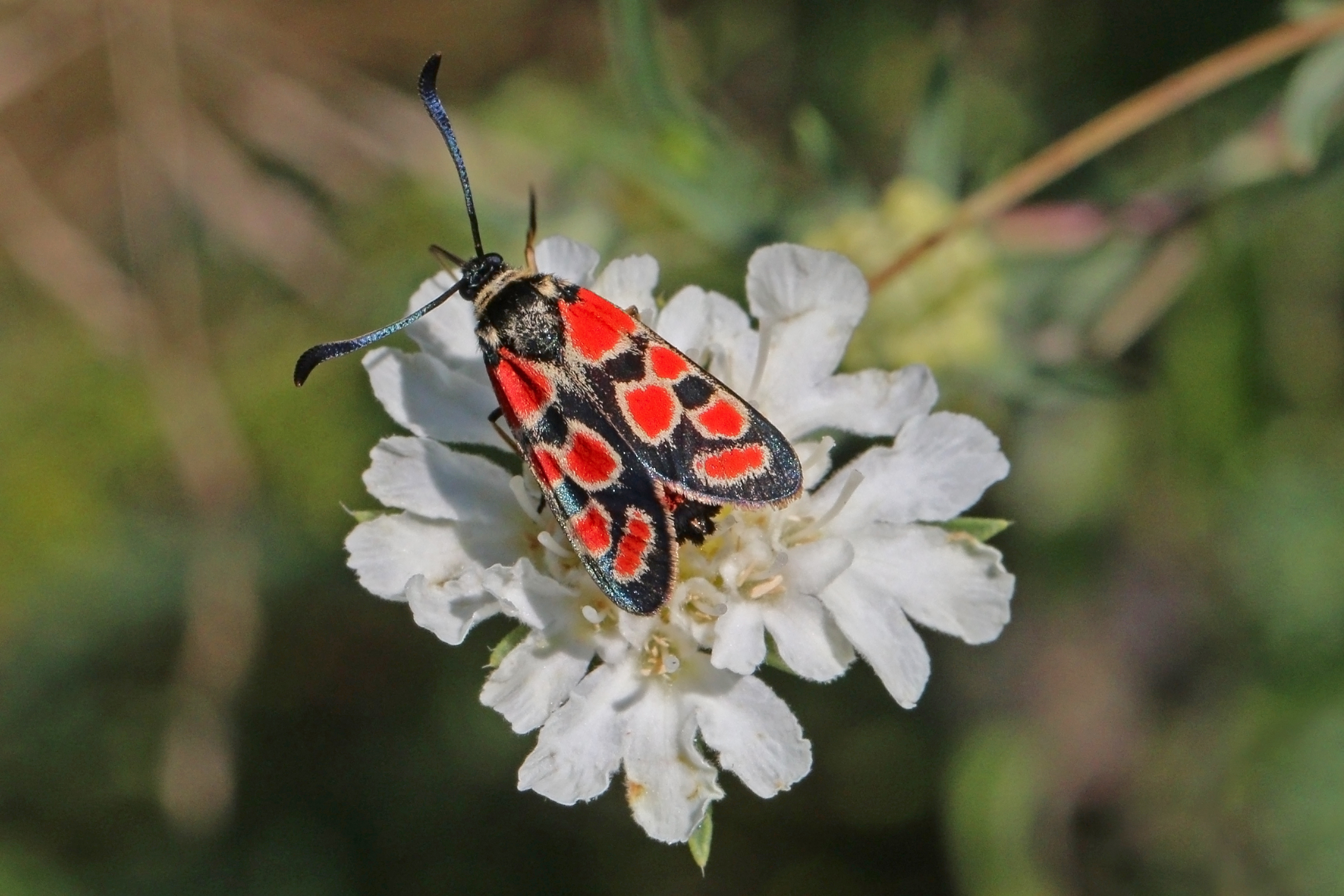
- In Bulgaria

Scientific classification
- Domain: Eukaryota
- Kingdom: Animalia
- Phylum: Arthropoda
- Class: Insecta
- Order: Lepidoptera
- Family: Zygaenidae
- Genus: Zygaena
- Species: Z. carniolica

Binomial name
- Zygaena carniolica (Scopoli, 1763)

Synonyms
- List: Sphinx carniolica Scopoli, 1763; Sphinx onobrychis [Denis & Schiffermüller], 1775; Zyganea diniensis Herrich-Schäffer, 1852; Sphynx cruenta Pallas, 1773; Sphinx flaveola Esper, 1786; Sphinx hedysari Hubner, 1796; Sphinx virginea Muller, 1766; Zyganea vandarbanensis Reiss, 1938; Zyganea croatica Reiss, 1941; Zyganea sagarraiana Reiss & Tremewan, 1964; Zyganea piemonticola Reiss, 1941; Zyganea formiacola Reiss & Tremewan, 1964; Zyganea aspromontica Reiss, 1941; Zyganea media Reiss, 1918; Zyganea pinskica Reiss, 1941; Zyganea tuapsica Reiss, 1941; Zyganea wiedemannii Ménétriés, 1839; Zyganea alta Reiss, 1921; Zyganea amabilis Reiss, 1921; Zyganea achalzichensis Reiss, 1935; Zygaena carniolica rogervillensis Leraut, 2012; Zygaena carniolica besseensis Leraut, 2012

= Zygaena carniolica =

Species of moth

Zygaena carniolica, sometimes described as the crepuscular burnet or eastern burnet, is a member of the family Zygaenidae.

== Subspecies ==
Subspecies include:

- Zygaena carniolica carniolica
- Zygaena carniolica albarracina Staudinger, 1887
- Zygaena carniolica amanda Reiss, 1921
- Zygaena carniolica amistosa Aistleitner & Lencina Gutierrez, 1995
- Zygaena carniolica apennina Turati, 1884
- Zygaena carniolica berolinensis Lederer, 1853
- Zygaena carniolica cruenta (Pallas, 1773)
- Zygaena carniolica demavendi Holik, 1936
- Zygaena carniolica descimonti Lucas, 1959
- Zygaena carniolica diniensis Herrich-Schaffer, 1852
- Zygaena carniolica flaveola (Esper, 1786)
- Zygaena carniolica graeca Staudinger, 1870
- Zygaena carniolica hedysari (Hübner, 1796)
- Zygaena carniolica leonhardi Reiss, 1921
- Zygaena carniolica magdalenae Abeille, 1909
- Zygaena carniolica modesta Burgeff, 1914 (France, Belgium, Luxembourg, Germany. Austria, the Czech Republic and Poland)
- Zygaena carniolica moraulti Holik, 1938
- Zygaena carniolica piatkowskii de Freina, 2006
- Zygaena carniolica rhaeticola Burgeff, 1926
- Zygaena carniolica roccii Verity, 1920
- Zygaena carniolica siciliana Reiss, 1921
- Zygaena carniolica virginea (Muller, 1766)
- Zygaena carniolica wiedemannii Menetries, 1839

== Distribution ==
This species can be found in most of Europe, except the British Isles and northern Scandinavia. It is also present from Asia Minor to Iran.

== Habitat ==
It inhabits warm and dry areas, grasslands and limestone substrate, steppe slopes and dry pastures.

== Description ==
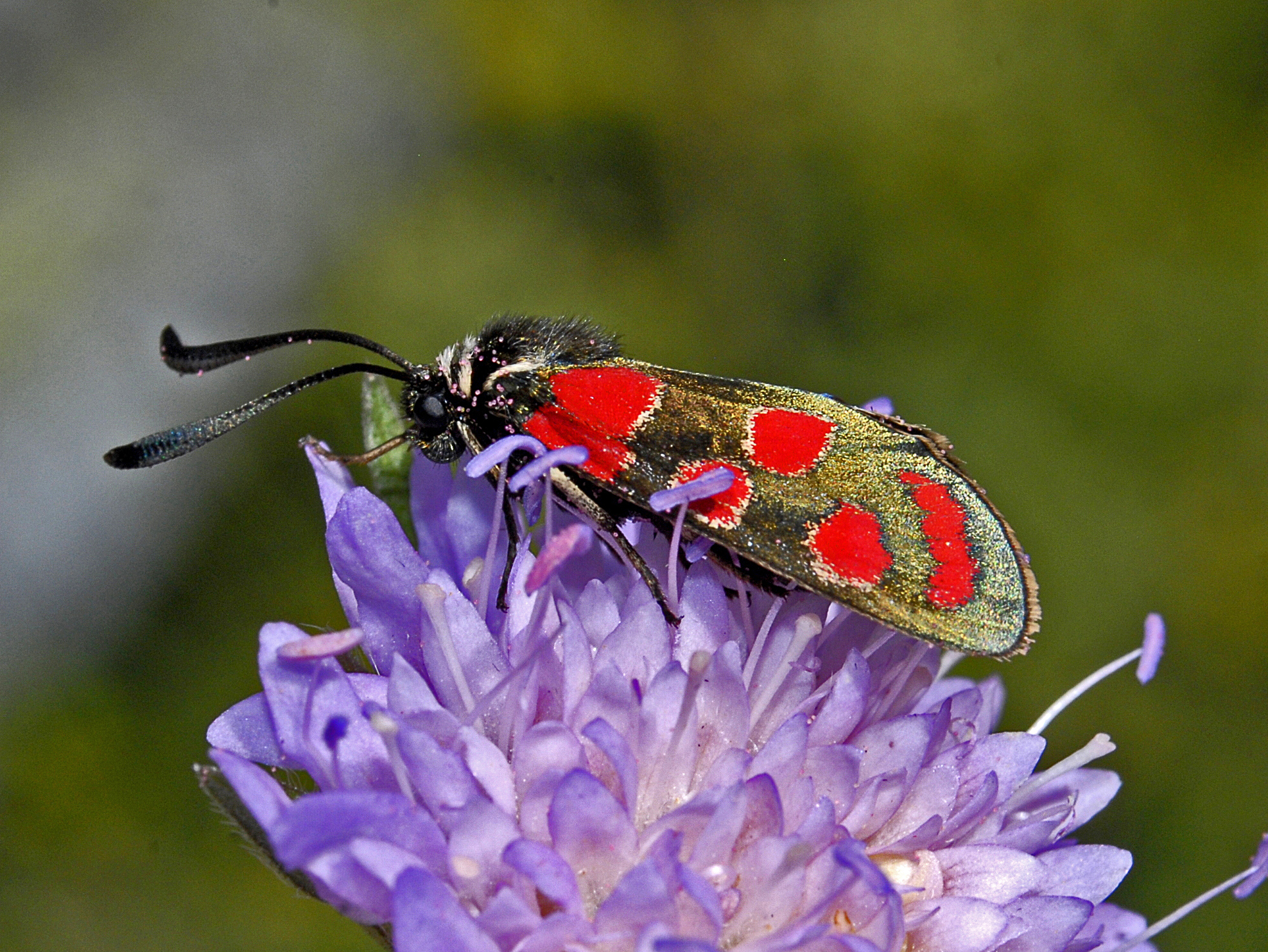
Lateral view

The wingspan is 30–35 mm. Forewings are bluish-black with six red spots surrounded by yellow. Hindwings have a red color with a black border. The outer spots are often in the shape of a crescent. The abdomen is black-blue, sometimes with a red belt. The caterpillar is light green with a series of triangular black spots on the sides of the body. Pupae are black-brown, with a white or yellowish ovoid cocoon.

This species is rather similar to Zygaena algira, Zygaena maroccana, Zygaena occitanica, Zygaena orana and Zygaena youngi.

== Technical description and variation ==
Z. carniolica. It is hardly possible to give a general description of the colour and pattern of the 20 odd forms which are being united under this species. The antenna is strong, being enlarged to a stout club; collar and edge of thorax mostly with whitish hairs; legs black-blue, yellow beneath. Forewing metallic black-green, densely scaled, fringes light reddish yellow; 6 spots, the 6 halfmoon-shaped, parallel with the distal margin, its normal colour in exceptional specimens absent, but then always recognizable by the scaling having a different gloss. The species is distributed throughout Central and South Europe, as well as North Africa and Western Asia, extending to Turkestan and the Altai. "To enumerate all transitions and aberrations would fatigue even the most patient," says Ochsenheimer; we also shall therefore only characterize the forms which alone till now have received names. The name-typical form, carniolica Scop.(= onobrychis Schiff. & Den., caffer Esp. (8d) has white edged spots on forewing and a red abdominal belt. From Central Germany- southwards to the Mediterranean and eastwards to the Altai. — ab. flaveola Esp. (= luteola Boisd.) [Zygaena carniolica ssp. flaveola Esper, 1786 ] (8d) has the hindwing and the spots of the forewing straw-yellow instead of red. As a rarity everywhere among the normal form.especially often found in Austria. — ab. dichroma Hirshke has the red mixed with yellow. — In ab. grossi Hirshke [ now junior synonym of Z.carniolica Scopoli, 1763] the red is replaced by coffee-brown. — hedysari Hbn. (= astragali Hbn., onobrychis Boisd., meliloti Hbn., sedi Dup.) [Zygaena carniolica ssp. hedysari Hübner, 1796] (8e) has no red abdominal belt: the commonest form in Germany, but locally predominating also in Italy and other countries. — diniensis H.-Sch.[Zygaena carniolica ssp. diniensis Herrich-Schäffer, 1852] (8e) has a red belt; the spots of the forewing very large, fiery red, with very thin light borders. French Riviera. — In bohatschi Wagn.[ now junior synonym of

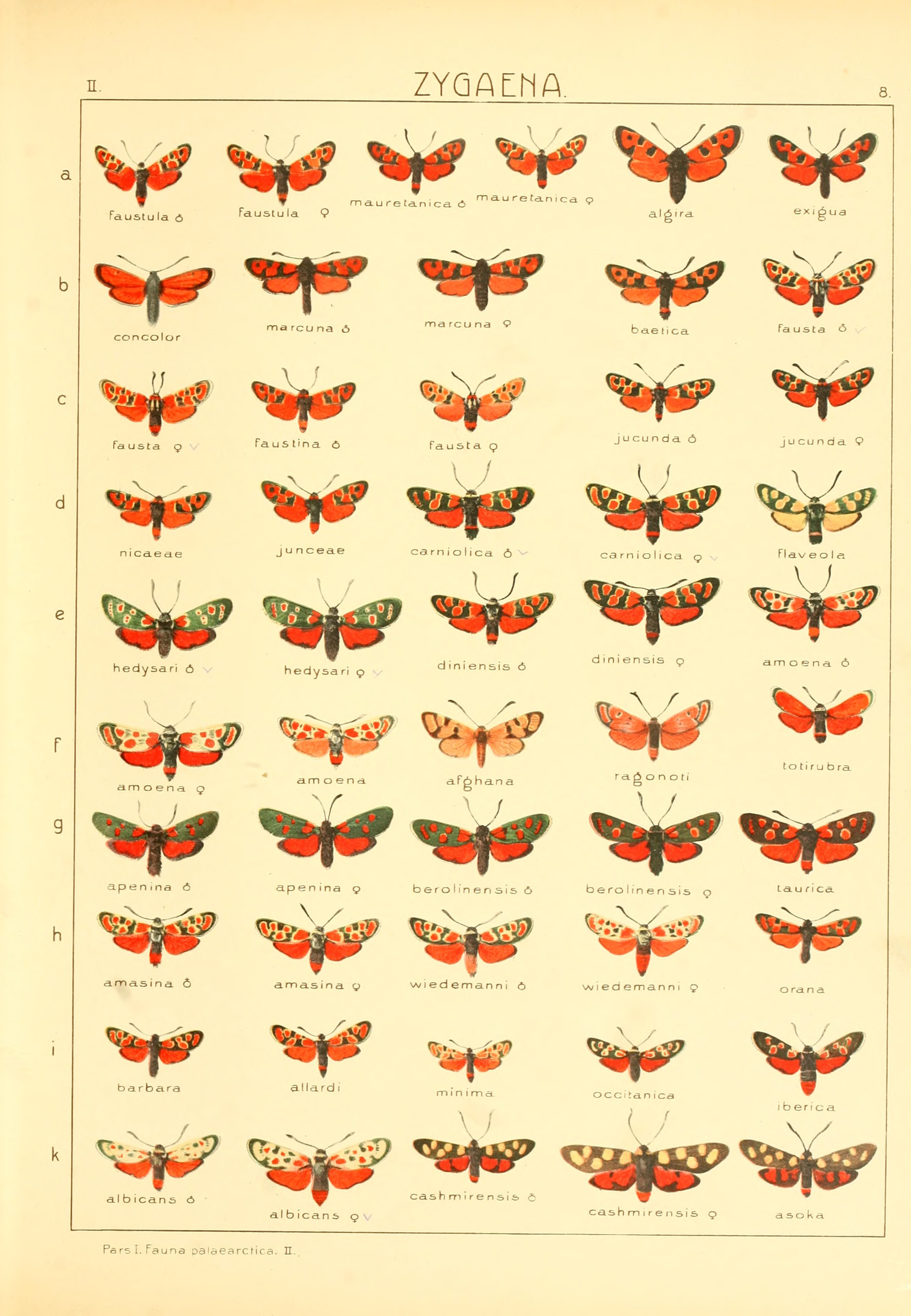
Plate from Seitz

depicting a few subspecies]] Z. carniolica Scopoli, 1763] the spots of the forewing are confluent in pairs; Liguria.— In ab. jurassica Blachier [ now Zygaena carniolica ssp. virginea Müller, 1766] the central spots are very large and connected with the red basal area by a costal streak, while the 6 spot remains isolated; found near Geneva in July and August. — ab. weileri Stgr. (= diniensis Oberth.) [ now Zygaena carniolica ssp. modesta Burgeff, 1914] . Here the proximal spots are merged to a large red patch which bears single red dots, only the 6 (lunate) spot remaining separate; in Germany, Austria and at the Riviera. — ab. ragonoti Gianelli (8f) [now Zygaena carniolica ssp. virginea Müller, 1766 ] from Turin, is only a modification of the form weileri; the forewing is almost entirely red, but, besides the 6 spot being isolated, there are some more black markings in the basal area of the forewing than in weileri. — In the Tring Museum there is an aberration with entirely red wings, which may be named totirubra ab. nov. [now junior synonym of Zygaena carniolica Scopoli, 1763] (8f), since the corresponding forms of other species of Zygaena have received names. Found in Hungary.— In amoena Stgr. [now junior synonym of Zygaena carniolica Scopoli, 1763 ] (8ef), from Hungary and Lower Austria, the whitish edges of the spots of the forewing are so enlarged that the white almost entirely displaces the dark ground-colour, the hindwing being sometimes pale pink, as in the third specimen figured as (amoena on 8f.) — In berolinensis Stgr. [ Zygaena carniolica ssp. berolinensis Lederer, 1853 ] (8g), occurring singly everywhere among the normal form, but being especially typical at the Italian Riviera, the white margins of the spots of the forewing are completely absent and the abdomen is without belt. — As taurica Stgr.[ Zygaena carniolica ssp. taurica Staudinger, 1879 ] (8g) a Lydian form is known in which the proximal spots are broadly white-edged, while the 6 transverse, spot has almost disappeared. — In apenina Tur. (= wiskotti Calb.) [ now Z. carniolica ssp. hedysari Hübner, 1796 ] (8g), which flies not rarely near Genoa behind the Campo Santo among hedysari and berolinensis, the 6 transverse spot is completely absent or is only indicated as a dull shadow in the ground colour.- graeca Stgr. [ Z. carniolica ssp. graeca Staudinger, 1870] resembles a small carniolica of the name-typical form, and has like this insect a red belt, but the whitish yellow edges of the spots of the forewing are much thinner; from Greece.amasina Stgr. (8j) [Zygaena carniolica ssp. amasina Staudinger, 1879 ], from Asia Minor, closely resembles amoena but is beautifully bright-red instead of pink and has abundant traces of the black ground colour, which in amoena is almost entirely replaced by white.wiedemanni Men. [ Z. carniolica ssp. wiedemannii Ménétriés, 1839 ] (8h), from Anterior Asia, on the contrary has so much white on the forewing that this is the prevalent colour: moreover, the abdomen is vermilion except the base and tip.— albarracina Stgr. [ Z. carniolica ssp. albarracina Staudinger, 1887, from Andalusia, is a small form which approaches orana, but has less red on the abdomen.In transiens Stgr. [ Z. carniolica ssp. transiens Staudinger, 1887 ] the spot 6 which is edged with white in the previous forms, has become all white, the red centre disappearing, this form therefore approaching the occitanica group, which one has several times endeavoured to distinguish specifically from the carniolica-forms from Western Asia.

== Biology ==
It is a univoltine species. Adults are on wing from July to August. Adults feed on the nectar of flowers in the family Fabaceae. The larvae feed on Lotus, Anthyllis, Dorycnium and Onobrychis species. They frequently rest large numbers on flowers. Pupation occurs in May–June. The caterpillars hibernate.

== Gallery ==
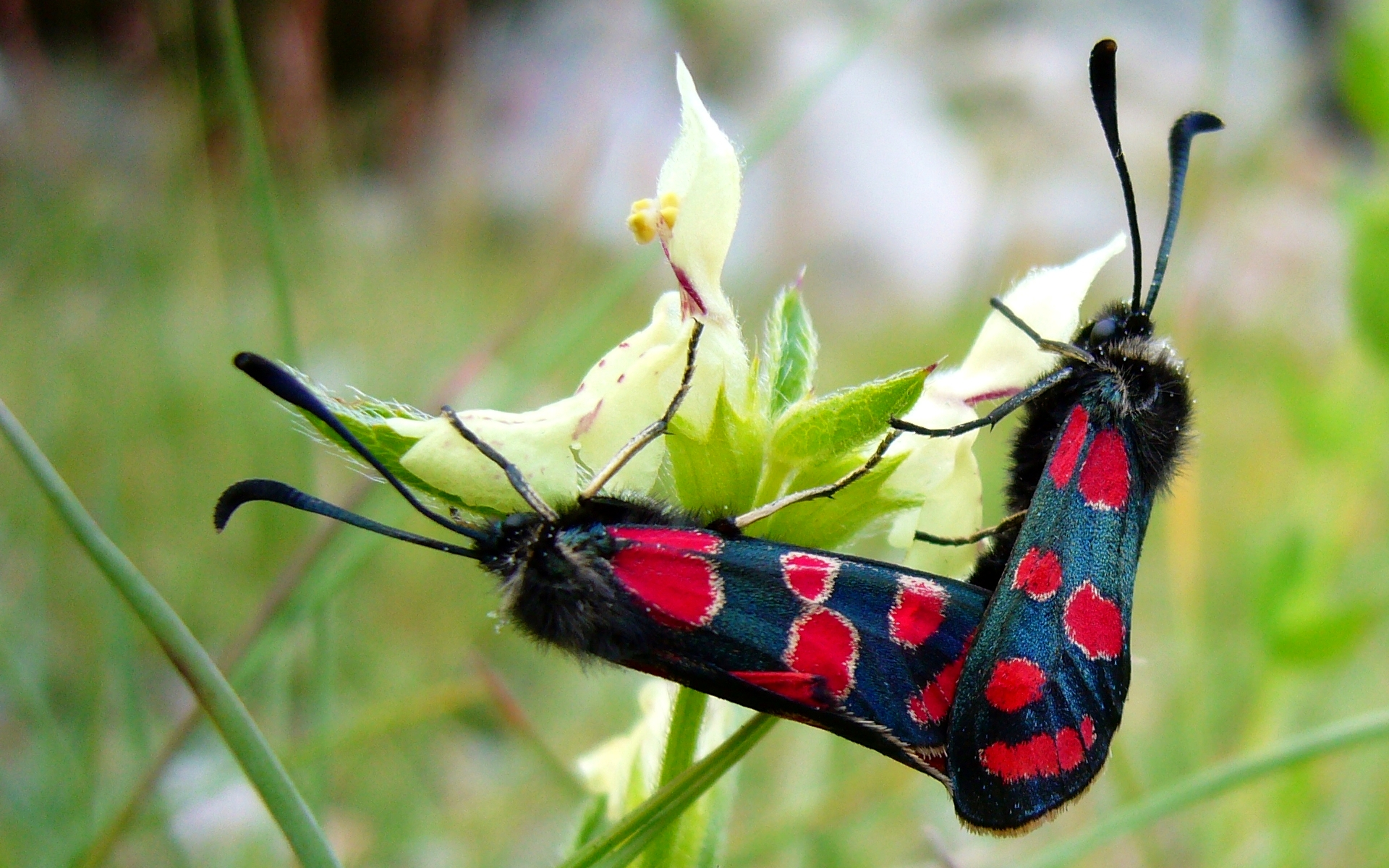
Mating pair

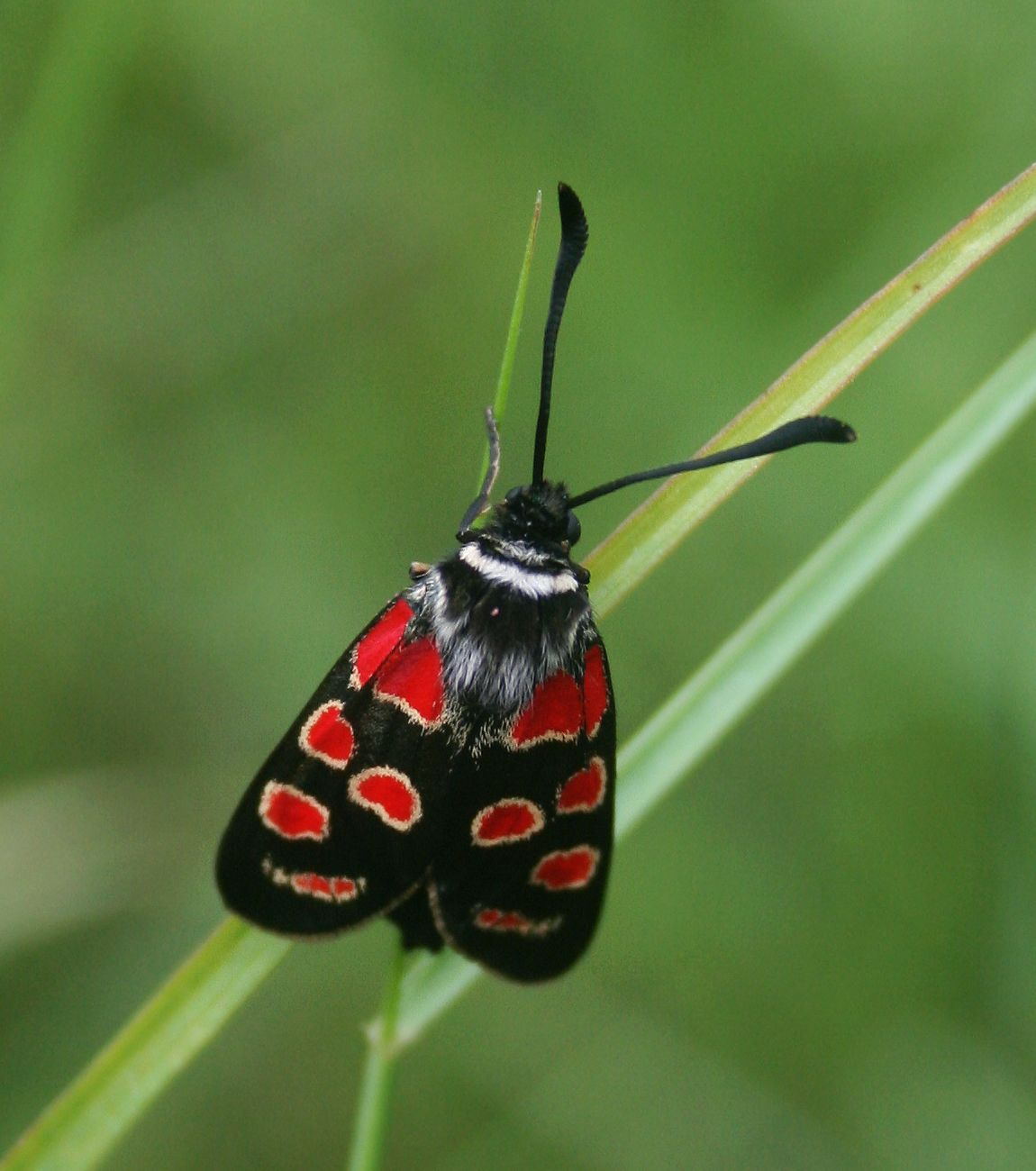
Adult

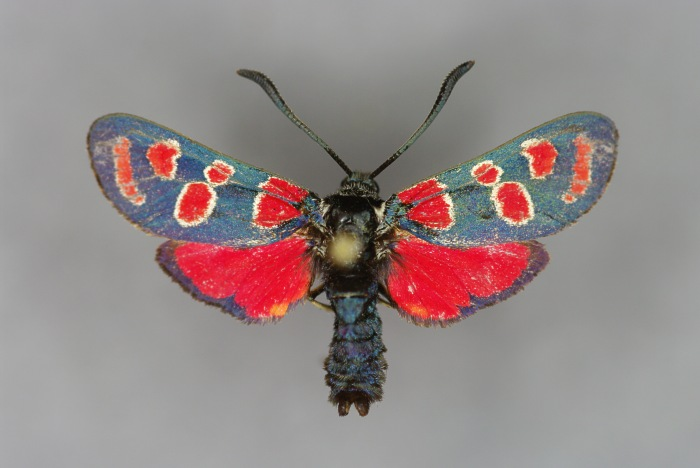
Mounted specimen

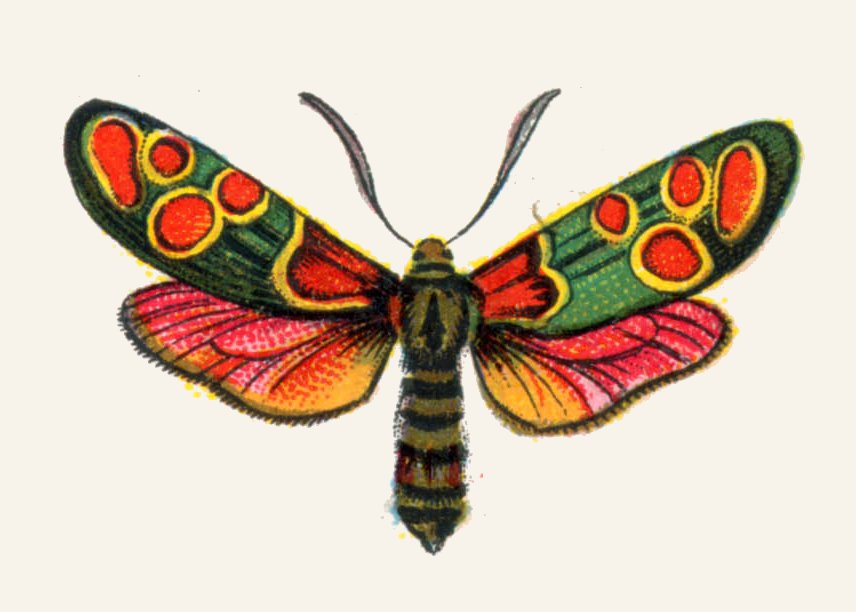
Illustration

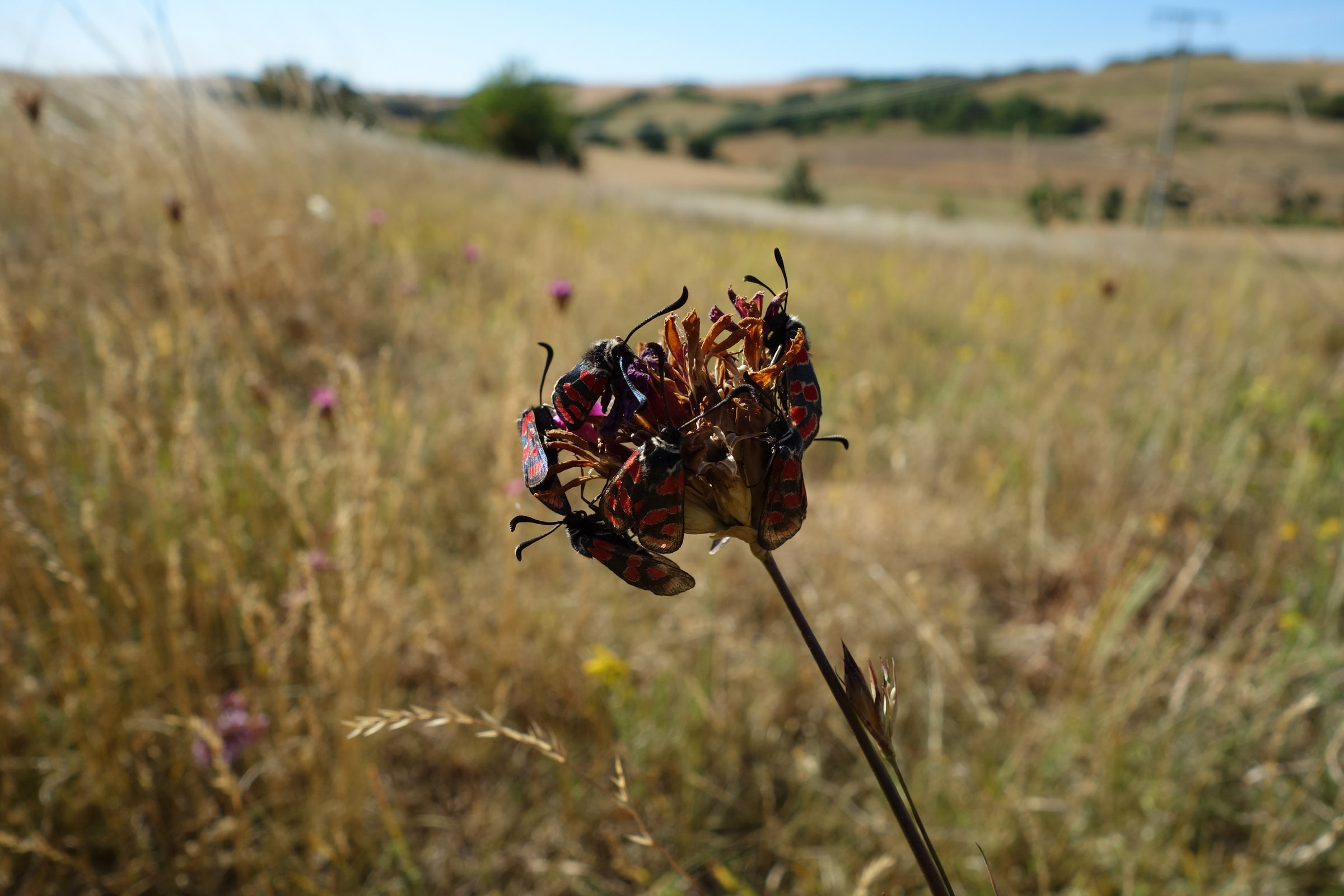
Resting

== Bibliography ==
- Abivardi, Cyrus (2008). "Burnet moth biology". V Capinera, John L. Encyclopedia of entomology (2. izd.). Heidelberg: Springer Science+Business Media. str. 617–622. ISBN 978-1-4020-6242-1.
- Binzenhöfer, Birgit; Schröder, Boris; Strauss, Barbara; Biedermann, Robert; Settele, Josef (2005). "Habitat models and habitat connectivity analysis for butterflies and burnet moths – The example of Zygaena carniolica and Coenonympha arcania". Biological Conservation 126: 247–259.
- C. M. Naumann, G. M. Tarmann, W. G. Tremewan: The Western Palaearctic Zygaenidae. Apollo Books, Stenstrup, 1999, ISBN 87-88757-15-3
- O. Karsholt, J. Razowski (eds.), 1996. The Lepidoptera of Europe: a distributional checklist
- Šašić, Martina; Nahirnić, Ana; Tarmann, Gerhard M. (2016-12-31). "Zygaenidae (Lepidoptera) in the Lepidoptera collections of the Croatian Natural History Museum". Natura Croatica: Periodicum Musei Historiae Naturalis Croatici. 25 (2): 233–248. doi:10.20302/NC.2016.25.19. eISSN 1848-7386.
