= Leskia siphonina =

Scientific classification
- Kingdom: Animalia
- Phylum: Arthropoda
- Class: Insecta
- Order: Diptera
- Family: Tachinidae
- Subfamily: Tachininae
- Tribe: Leskiini
- Genus: Leskia
- Species: L. siphonina

Binomial name
- Leskia siphonina (Villeneuve, 1937)

Synonyms
- Myiobia siphonina Villeneuve, 1937

Species of fly

Leskia siphonina is a species of bristle fly in the family Tachinidae.

== Distribution ==
Guyana.
