= Leskia occidentalis =

Scientific classification
- Kingdom: Animalia
- Phylum: Arthropoda
- Class: Insecta
- Order: Diptera
- Family: Tachinidae
- Genus: Leskia
- Species: L. occidentalis

Binomial name
- Leskia occidentalis (Coquillett, 1895)

Synonyms
- Drepanoglossa occidentalis Coquillett, 1895; Myobia gilensis Townsend, 1897

Species of fly

Leskia occidentalis is a species of bristle fly in the family Tachinidae. It is found in North America.
