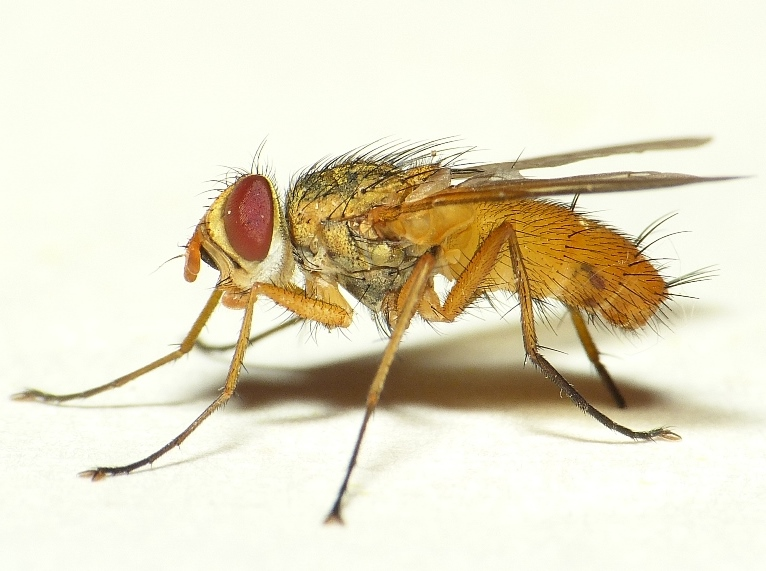
- Leskia aurea

Scientific classification
- Kingdom: Animalia
- Phylum: Arthropoda
- Clade: Pancrustacea
- Class: Insecta
- Order: Diptera
- Family: Tachinidae
- Subfamily: Tachininae
- Tribe: Leskiini
- Genus: Leskia; Robineau-Desvoidy, 1830

Type species
- Leskia flavescens Robineau-Desvoidy, 1830

Synonyms
- Eumyiobia Mesnil, 1957; Eumyobia Townsend, 1911; Leskiopalpus Townsend, 1916; Myobiopsis Townsend, 1916; Pirrosia Rondani, 1873; Pyrosia Schiner, 1868; Pyrrhosia Brauer & von Berganstamm, 1889; Pyrrosia Rondani, 1856; Sipholeskia Townsend, 1916

= Leskia =

Genus of flies

Leskia is a genus of flies in the family Tachinidae.

== Species ==
- Leskia angusta (Walker, 1853)
- Leskia arturi (Guimarães, 1975)
- Leskia aurea (Fallén, 1820)
- Leskia aurifrons (Macquart, 1846)
- Leskia bezziana (Baranov, 1938)
- Leskia bibens (Wiedemann, 1830)
- Leskia bwambana Emden, 1960
- Leskia certima (Curran, 1927)
- Leskia darwini Emden, 1960
- Leskia depilis (Coquillett, 1895)
- Leskia diadema (Wiedemann, 1830)
- Leskia erevanica Richter, 1974
- Leskia famelica (Wiedemann, 1830)
- Leskia flava (Townsend, 1911)
- Leskia flavescens (Townsend, 1929)
- Leskia flavipennis (Wiedemann, 1830)
- Leskia flavitegula Zhang, 2023
- Leskia hirtula (Villeneuve, 1936)
- Leskia ignifrons (Bezzi, 1928)
- Leskia lineata Emden, 1960
- Leskia lineaticollis Emden, 1960
- Leskia longirostris (Villeneuve, 1937)
- Leskia macilenta Mesnil, 1978
- Leskia miranda Mesnil, 1973
- Leskia occidentalis (Coquillett, 1895)
- Leskia pallidithorax Emden, 1960
- Leskia palliventris Emden, 1960
- Leskia pellucens Curran, 1925
- Leskia penaltis (Curran, 1934)
- Leskia pertecta (Walker, 1861)
- Leskia pertinax (Curran, 1934)
- Leskia pilipleura Mesnil, 1978
- Leskia pruinosa Emden, 1960
- Leskia sanctaecrucis (Thompson, 1963)
- Leskia sappirina Mesnil, 1978
- Leskia similis (Townsend, 1916)
- Leskia siphonina (Villeneuve, 1937)
- Leskia taylori Emden, 1960
- Leskia verna (Curran, 1934)
- Leskia villeneuvei Emden, 1960
