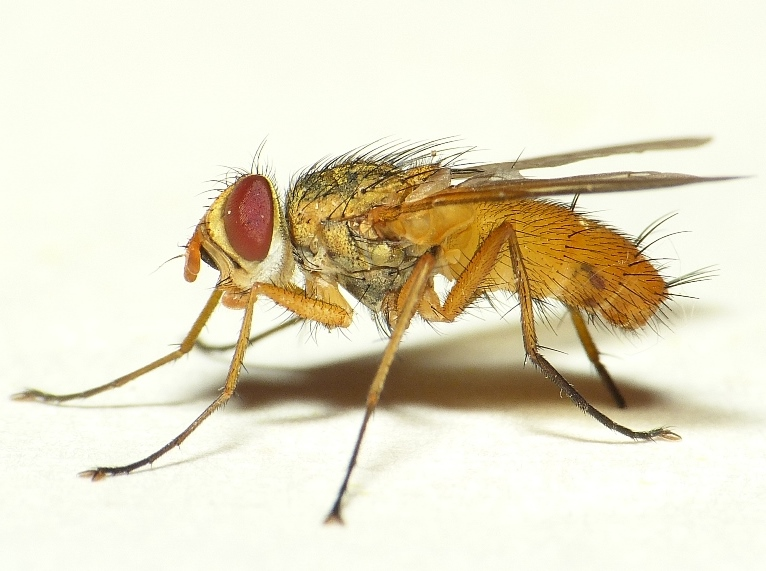
- Leskia aurea

Scientific classification
- Kingdom: Animalia
- Phylum: Arthropoda
- Clade: Pancrustacea
- Class: Insecta
- Order: Diptera
- Family: Tachinidae
- Subfamily: Tachininae
- Tribe: Leskiini
- Genus: Leskia
- Species: L. aurea

Binomial name
- Leskia aurea (Fallén, 1820)

Synonyms
- Tachina aurea Fallén, 1820; Leskia flavescens Robineau-Desvoidy, 1830

= Leskia aurea =

Species of fly

Leskia aurea is a European species of fly in the family Tachinidae.

== Distribution ==
British Isles, Czech Republic, Estonia, Hungary, Latvia, Lithuania, Moldova, Poland, Romania, Slovakia, Ukraine, Denmark, Finland, Norway, Sweden, Andorra, Bulgaria, Croatia, Italy, Portugal, Slovenia, Spain, Turkey, Austria, Belgium, France, Germany, Netherlands, Switzerland, Japan, Russia, Transcaucasia, China.
