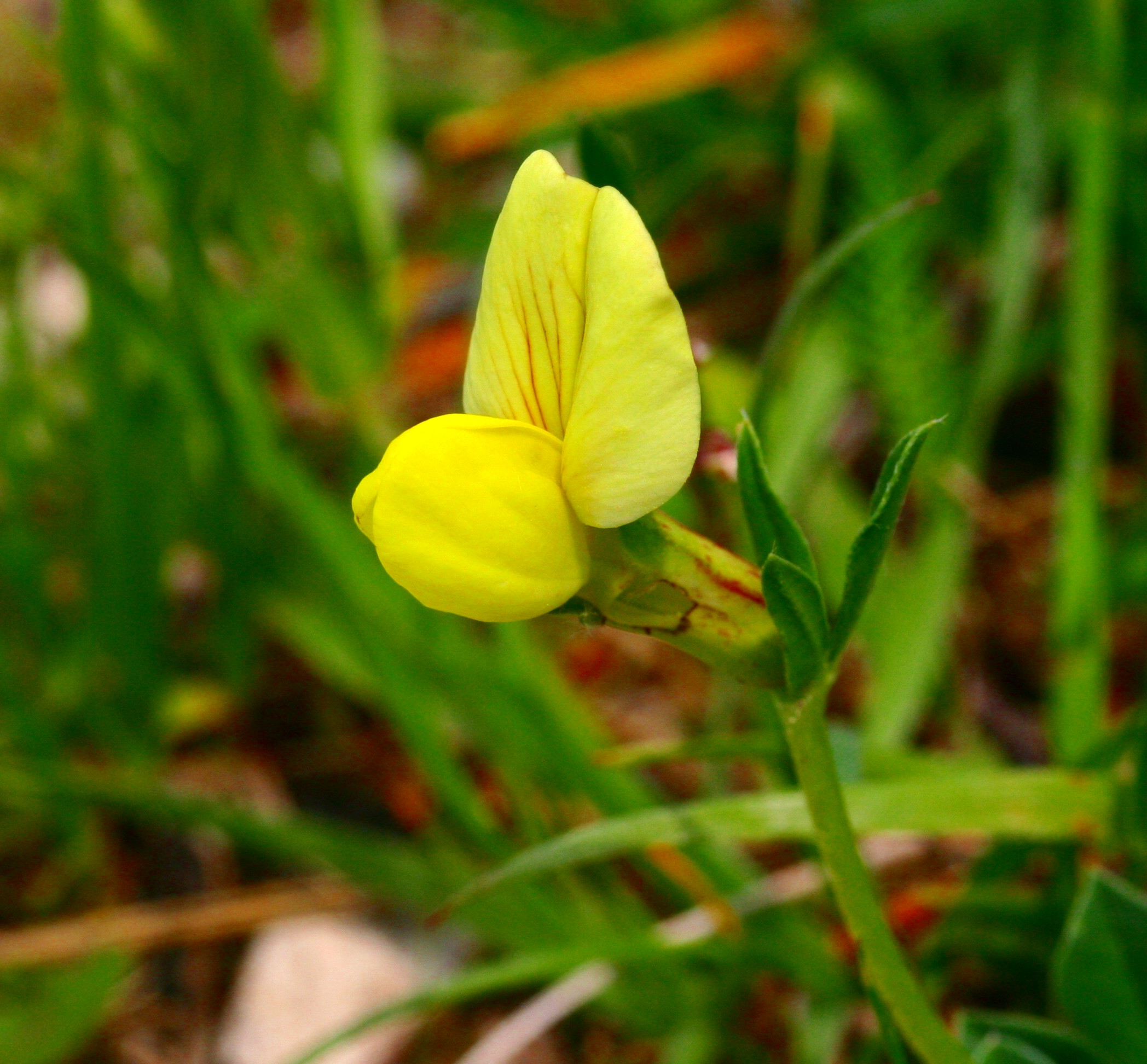

Scientific classification
- Kingdom: Plantae
- Clade: Tracheophytes
- Clade: Angiosperms
- Clade: Eudicots
- Clade: Rosids
- Order: Fabales
- Family: Fabaceae
- Subfamily: Faboideae
- Genus: Lotus
- Species: L. maritimus

Binomial name
- Lotus maritimus L.

Synonyms
- List: Lotus bouteloui Nyman; Lotus pratensis Mill.; Scandalida flava Medik.; Scandalida maritima (L.) Scop.; Tetragonolobus bouteloui Willk.; Tetragonolobus glaucus Dulac; Tetragonolobus maritimus (L.) Roth; Tetragonolobus maritimus var. hirsutus (Willk.) Muñoz Garm. & Pedrol; Tetragonolobus prostratus Moench; Tetragonolobus scandalida Scop.; Tetragonolobus tauricus Bunge ex Nyman

= Lotus maritimus =

Species of legume

Lotus maritimus is a species of plant in the legume family, native to Europe, Africa and temperate Asia. It is one of several species known as dragon's teeth.

== Description ==
Dragon's-teeth is a prostrate or debumbent (curving up at the tips), herbaceous perennial with branched stems up to about 30 cm long. The leaves are alternate and consist of three leaflets at the end of a short stalk (petiole) about 0.5 cm long. The leaflets are sessile, 10-30 mm long by 4-15 mm wide, oblanceolate, and finely hairy. At the base of the petiole there are two ovate stipules about 10 mm long.

Flowering takes place in spring and summer (May - August in Britain). The inflorescences arise from the leaf axils and have just one or two flowers on a peduncle that is considerably longer than the adjacent leaf. Each flower is subtended by a 3-lobed bract with narrow, pointed lobes. The flower consists of a reddish-green, hairy calyx up to 15 mm long which splits about halfway along into 5 unequal, pointed teeth. The corolla is about 25-30 mm long and has a pale yellow standard with reddish veins, and darker yellow wings and keel. The flowers have 10 stamens and one style.

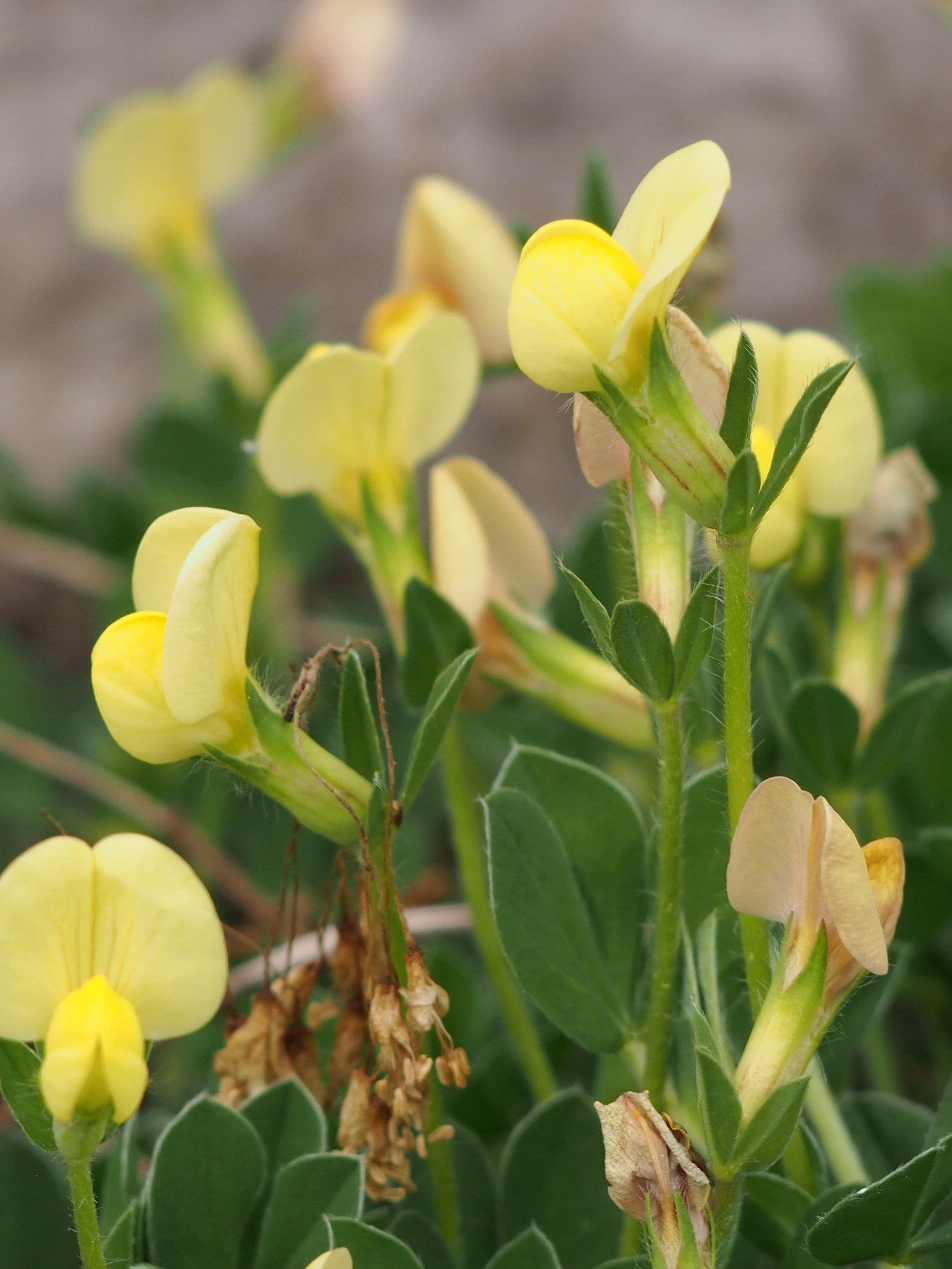
The flowers are bright yellow and occur singly or in pairs.

The superior ovary develops into a 4-winged sword-shaped fruit about 50 mm long, which is light green when fresh turning brown, woody and brittle when ripe. The fruit is dehiscent and contains many small, round seeds about 2 mm in diameter.

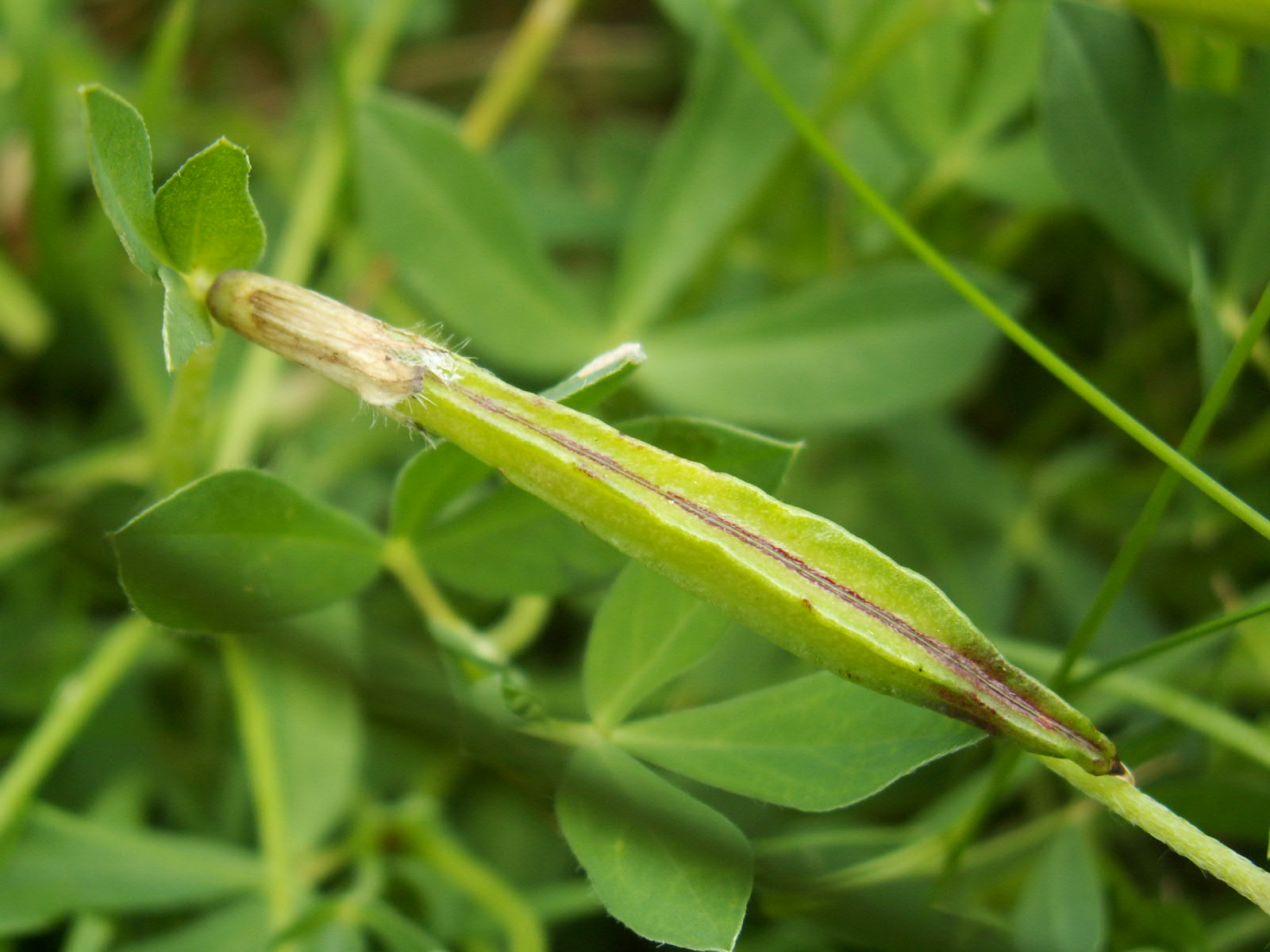
The fruit are very long and looks somewhat like a sword.

== Taxonomy ==
Linnaeus called it 'maritimus', which means "by the sea" because he thought that was where it grew, although modern maps show that it occurs in inland locations, too.

The name "dragon's-teeth" is a reference to the legend of Cadmus, the mythical founder of Thebes, who conjured an army by sowing the teeth of a dragon he had killed. A sward of Lotus maritimus in fruit could be compared to an army brandishing their swords, hence the name. The striking shape of the fruit is also the origin name of the old scientific name, Tetragonolobus, which is a Neo-Latin word meaning "lobed obong".

== Distribution and status ==
The native range of dragon's-teeth is in central to southern Europe, north Africa and western Asia. It extends northwards to Britain and Scandinavia where populations are often transient and it is sometimes classified as an introduction. However, despite speculation that it may be a contaminant of seed mixes, its occurrence in calcareous grassland nature reserves, shingle beaches and chalk pits does not point strongly towards such a source, and it could just as easily be classed as a native plant that is expanding through natural means in northern areas.

== Habitat and ecology ==
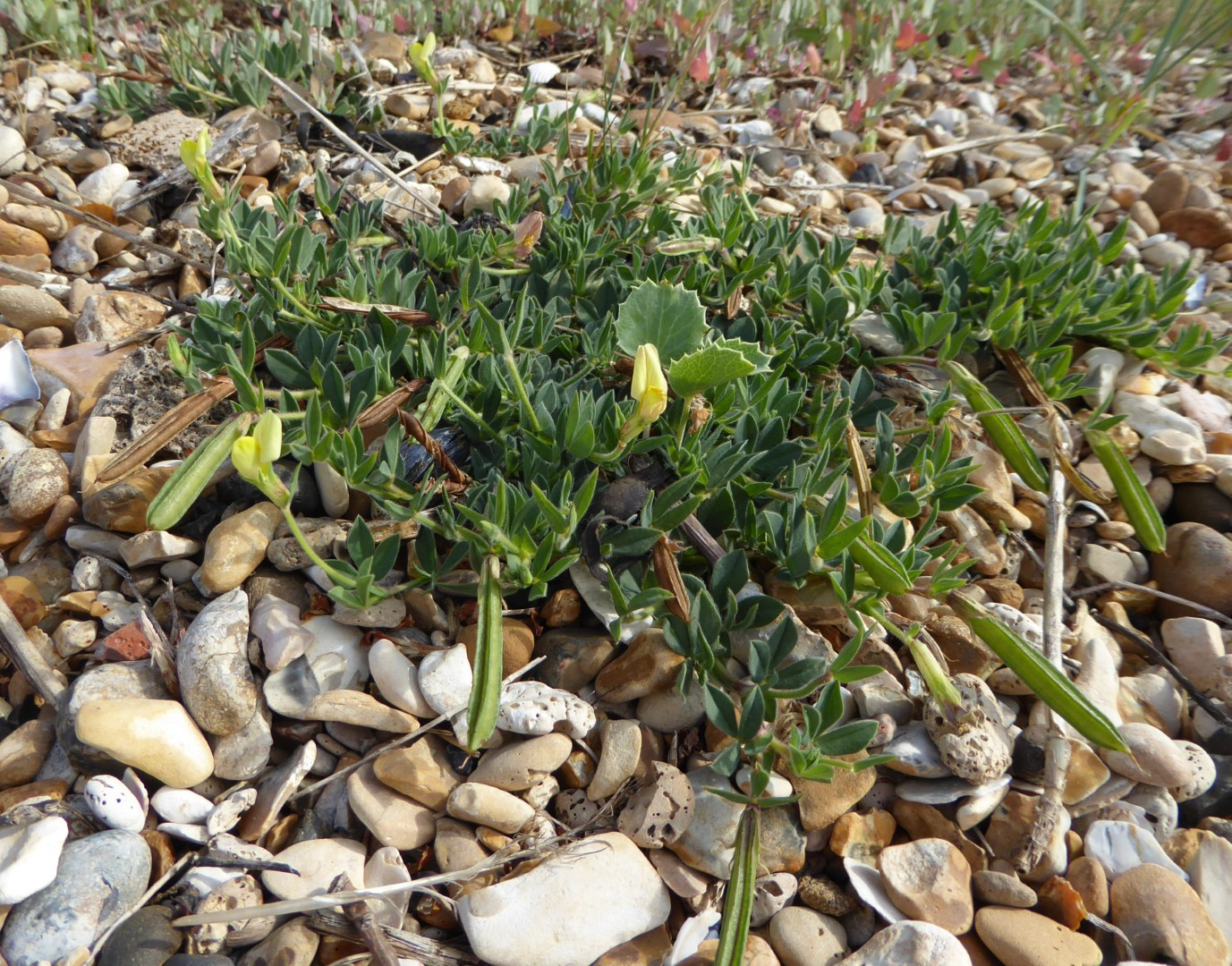
Dragon's-teeth often grows on beaches

Although it is a perennial, dragon's-teeth is usually found in places where there is bare ground available for the establishment of seedlings, including path edges and sandy or shingly beaches. In these situations it often behaves more like an annual, reproducing by seed rather than becoming permanently established.
