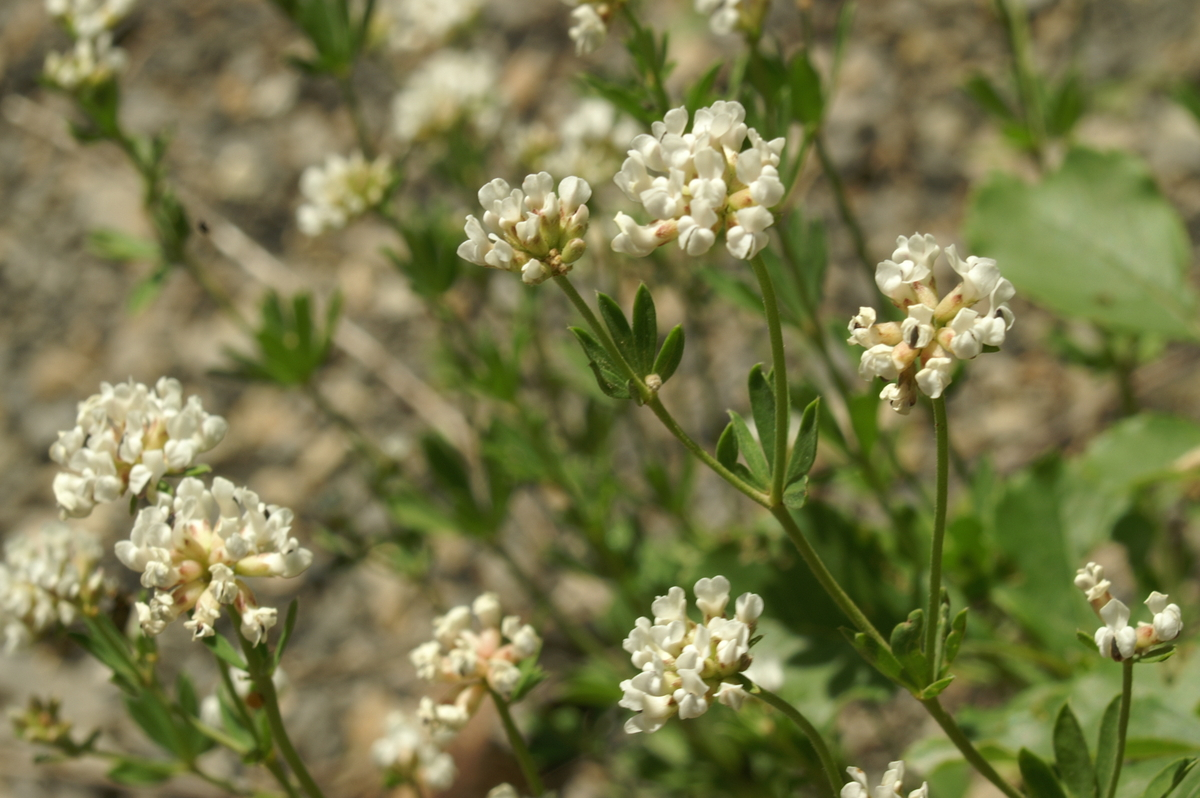

Scientific classification
- Kingdom: Plantae
- Clade: Tracheophytes
- Clade: Angiosperms
- Clade: Eudicots
- Clade: Rosids
- Order: Fabales
- Family: Fabaceae
- Subfamily: Faboideae
- Genus: Lotus
- Species: L. herbaceus

Binomial name
- Lotus herbaceus (Vill.) Jauzein

Synonyms
- Dorycnium crantzii (Vis.) Brand; Dorycnium gracile Jord.; Dorycnium herbaceum Vill.; Dorycnium jordanianum Willk.; Dorycnium jordanii Loret & Barrandon; Dorycnium sericeum Sweet; Lotus crantzii Vis.; Lotus dorycnium Crantz non L.; Lotus hemorroidalis Lam.; Lotus intermedius Loisel.; Lotus jordanii (Loret & Barrandon) Coulot, Rabaute & J.-M.Tison; Lotus sericeus DC.

= Lotus herbaceus =

Species of legume

Lotus herbaceus is a herbaceous perennial plant belonging to the genus Lotus of the family Fabaceae. The species includes the plants formerly called Dorycnium herbaceum and Dorycnium jordanii. The flowering period extends from May through July.

== Subspecies ==
Two subspecies are recognized:

- Lotus herbaceus subsp. gracilis (Jord.) Jauzein; synonyms include Dorycnium jordanii Loret & Barrandon – coast of the western Mediterranean, both Europe and Africa
- Lotus herbaceus subsp. herbaceus; synonyms include Dorycnium herbaceum Vill. – southern and eastern Europe through Turkey to the Caucasus

== Distribution ==
Lotus herbaceus can be found in southern and eastern Europe through Turkey to the Caucasus. It also extends into northern Africa.
