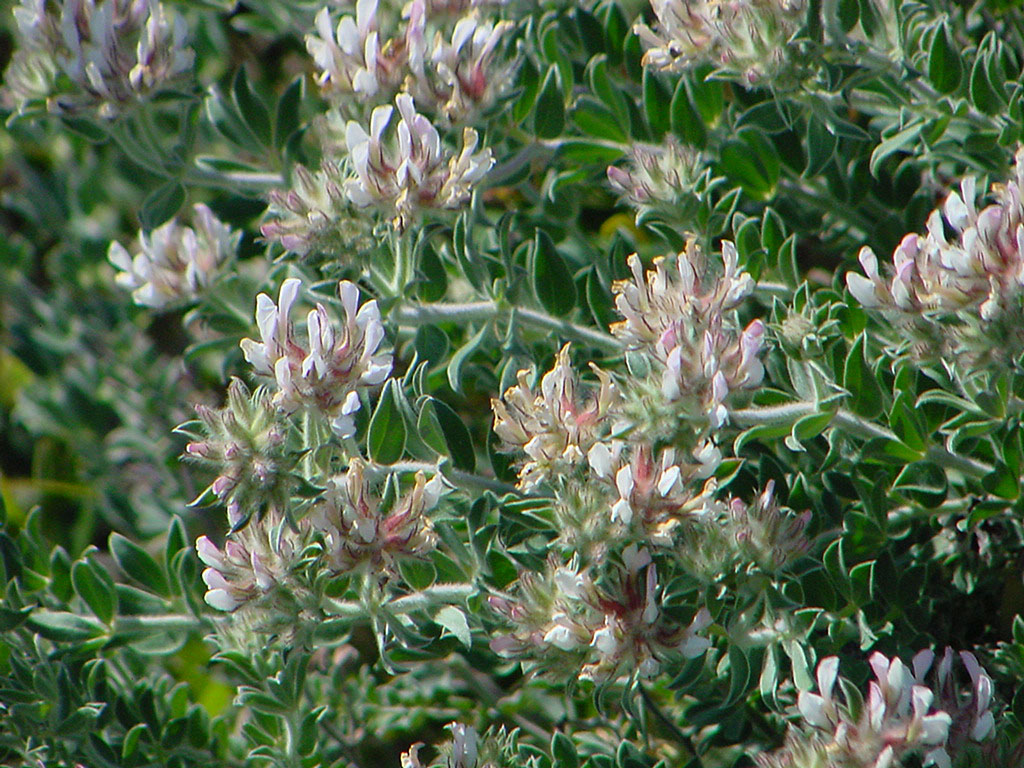

Scientific classification
- Kingdom: Plantae
- Clade: Embryophytes
- Clade: Tracheophytes
- Clade: Spermatophytes
- Clade: Angiosperms
- Clade: Eudicots
- Clade: Rosids
- Order: Fabales
- Family: Fabaceae
- Subfamily: Faboideae
- Genus: Lotus
- Species: L. hirsutus

Binomial name
- Lotus hirsutus L.

Synonyms
- Bonjeanea hirsuta (L.) Rchb.; Bonjeanea hirta Jord. & Fourr.; Bonjeanea venusta Jord. & Fourr.; Dorycnium hirsutum (L.) Ser.; Lotus candidus Mill.; Lotus pilosus Medik.

= Lotus hirsutus =

Species of legume

Lotus hirsutus, also known by the synonym Dorycnium hirsutum, common name: canary clover or hairy canary-clover, is a species of flowering plant in the legume family Fabaceae.

== Description ==
It is a low-growing, domed semi-evergreen subshrub, reaching on average 20–50 centimetres (7.9–19.7 in) in height. Its habit is erect, green, hairy and branched. The silver leaves are sessile, alternate and quite fuzzy. The flowers are white veined pinkish-red, in terminal umbels composed of four to ten flowers. The flowering period extends from May through July. The fruits are cylindrical reddish brown seed pods.

== Distribution and habitat ==
This plant is native to the Mediterranean Basin, from Portugal to Turkey and south to northern Africa.

The typical habitat of this sub-shrub is grassland, in well-drained soil. Plants can be found at an altitude of 0–1,500 metres (0–4,921 ft).

== Cultivation ==
This plant is found in cultivation. Though hardy down to −10 °C (14 °F), it requires a sheltered spot in full sun. In the United Kingdom it has won the Royal Horticultural Society's Award of Garden Merit.

== Gallery ==
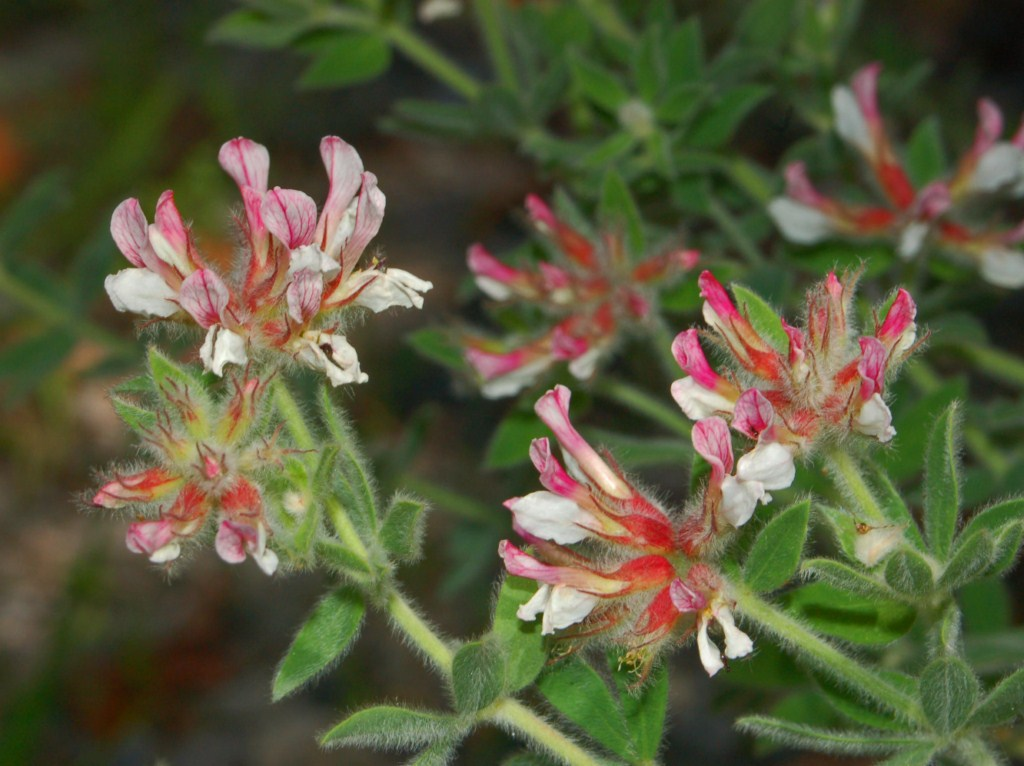
Flowers

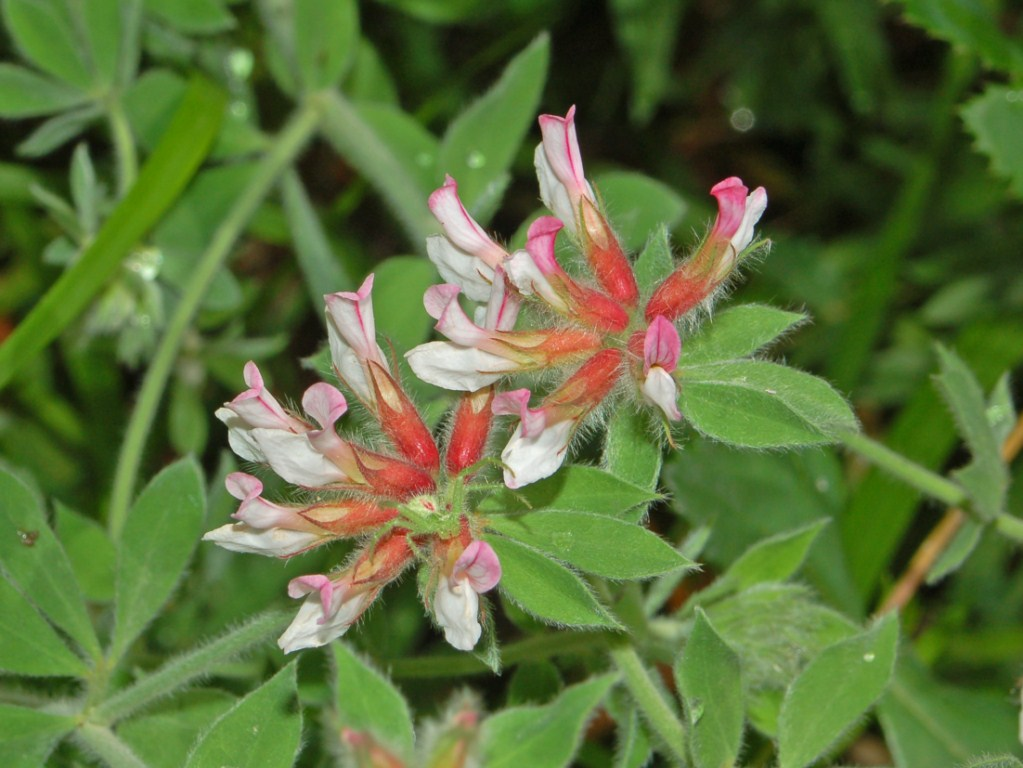
Flowers

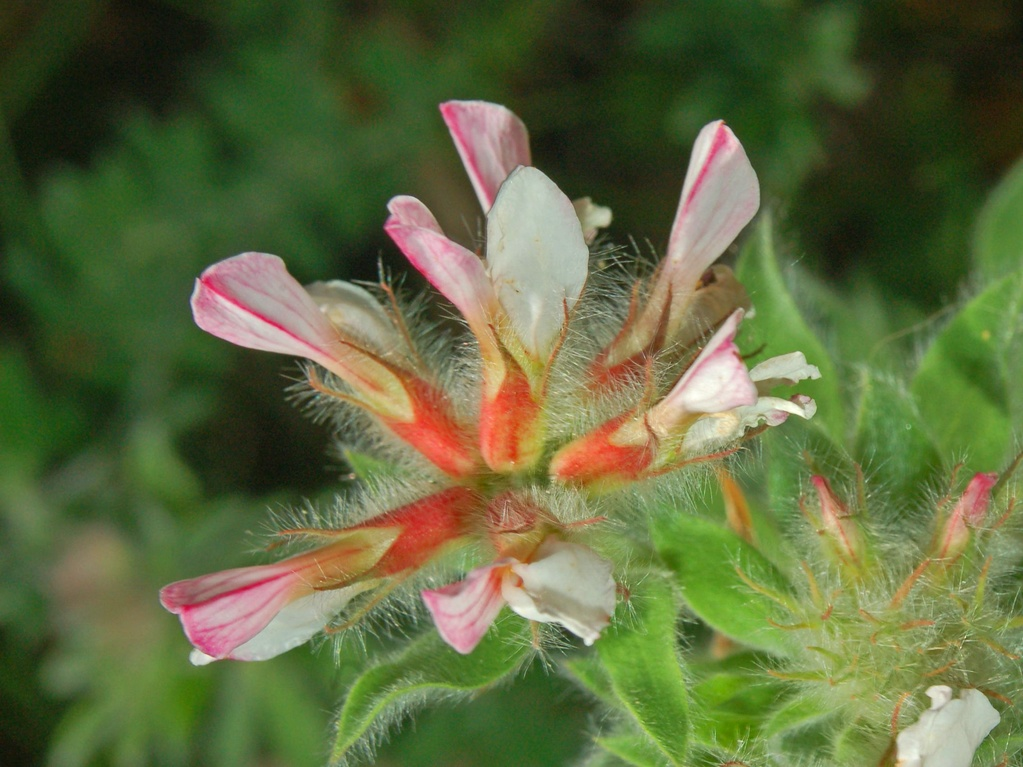
Flower

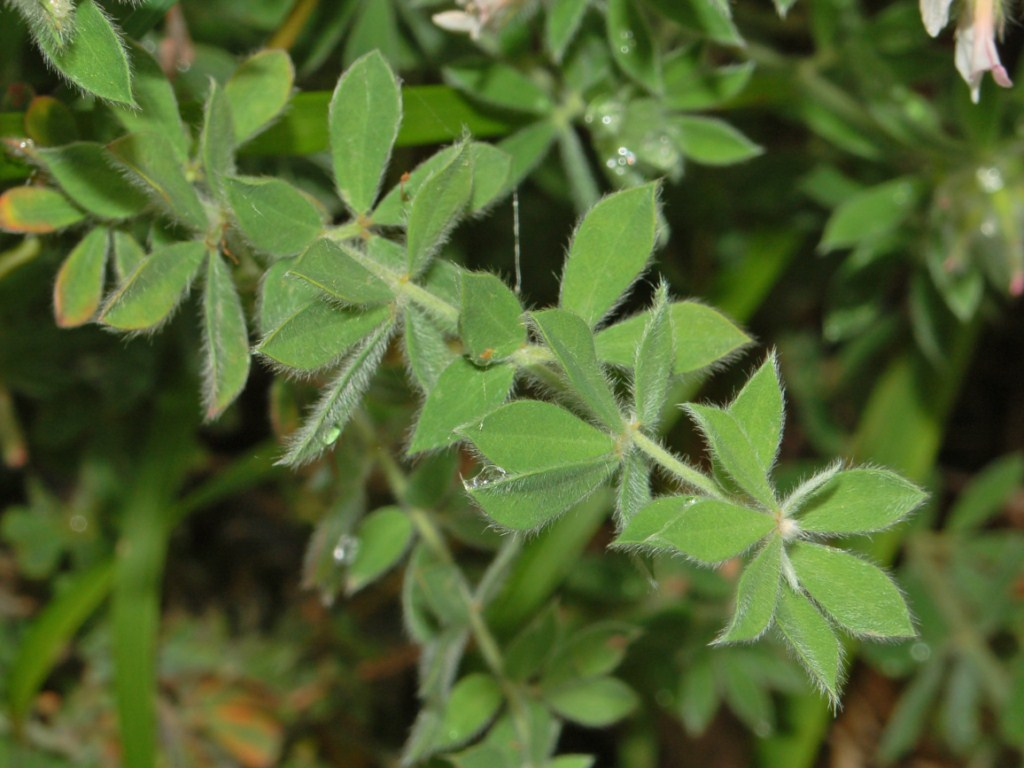
Leaves
