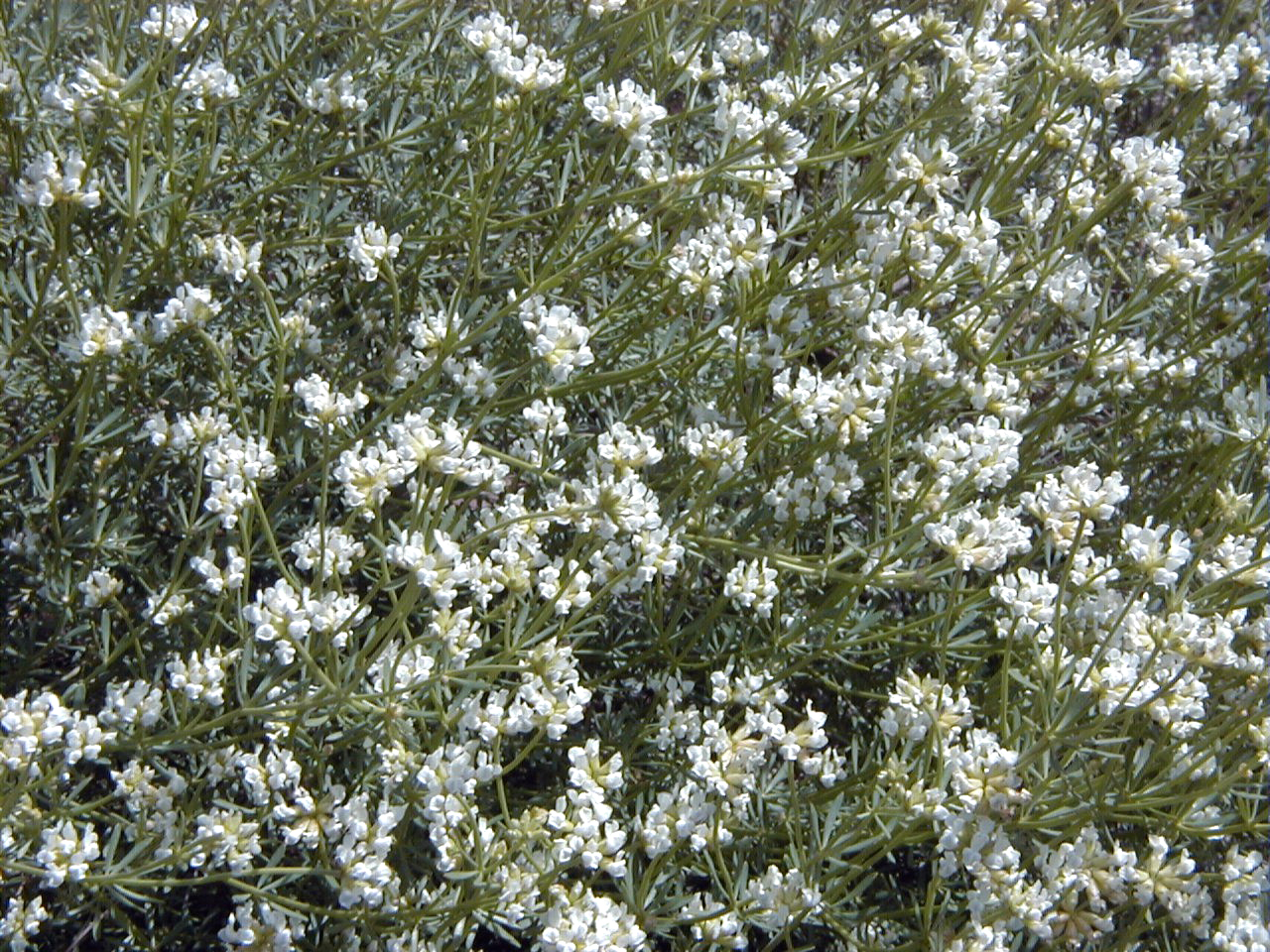

Scientific classification
- Kingdom: Plantae
- Clade: Tracheophytes
- Clade: Angiosperms
- Clade: Eudicots
- Clade: Rosids
- Order: Fabales
- Family: Fabaceae
- Subfamily: Faboideae
- Genus: Lotus
- Species: L. dorycnium

Binomial name
- Lotus dorycnium L.

Synonyms
- Dorycnium pentaphyllum Scop.

= Lotus dorycnium =

Species of legume

Lotus dorycnium, previously known by the synonym Dorycnium pentaphyllum, common names: prostrate Canary clover and badassi, is a herbaceous perennial plant belonging to the genus Lotus of the family Fabaceae.

== Description ==
Lotus dorycnium reaches an average height of 10–70 centimetres (3.9–27.6 in). The stems and the branches are woody. The leaves are composed by five segments and are hairy on both sides. Flowers are small and white, in terminal umbels of 5–20 flowers on a short stalk. The flowering period extends from May until July. The fruits are ovoid reddish-brown legumes 3–6 millimetres (0.12–0.24 in) long containing one or two seeds.

== Gallery ==
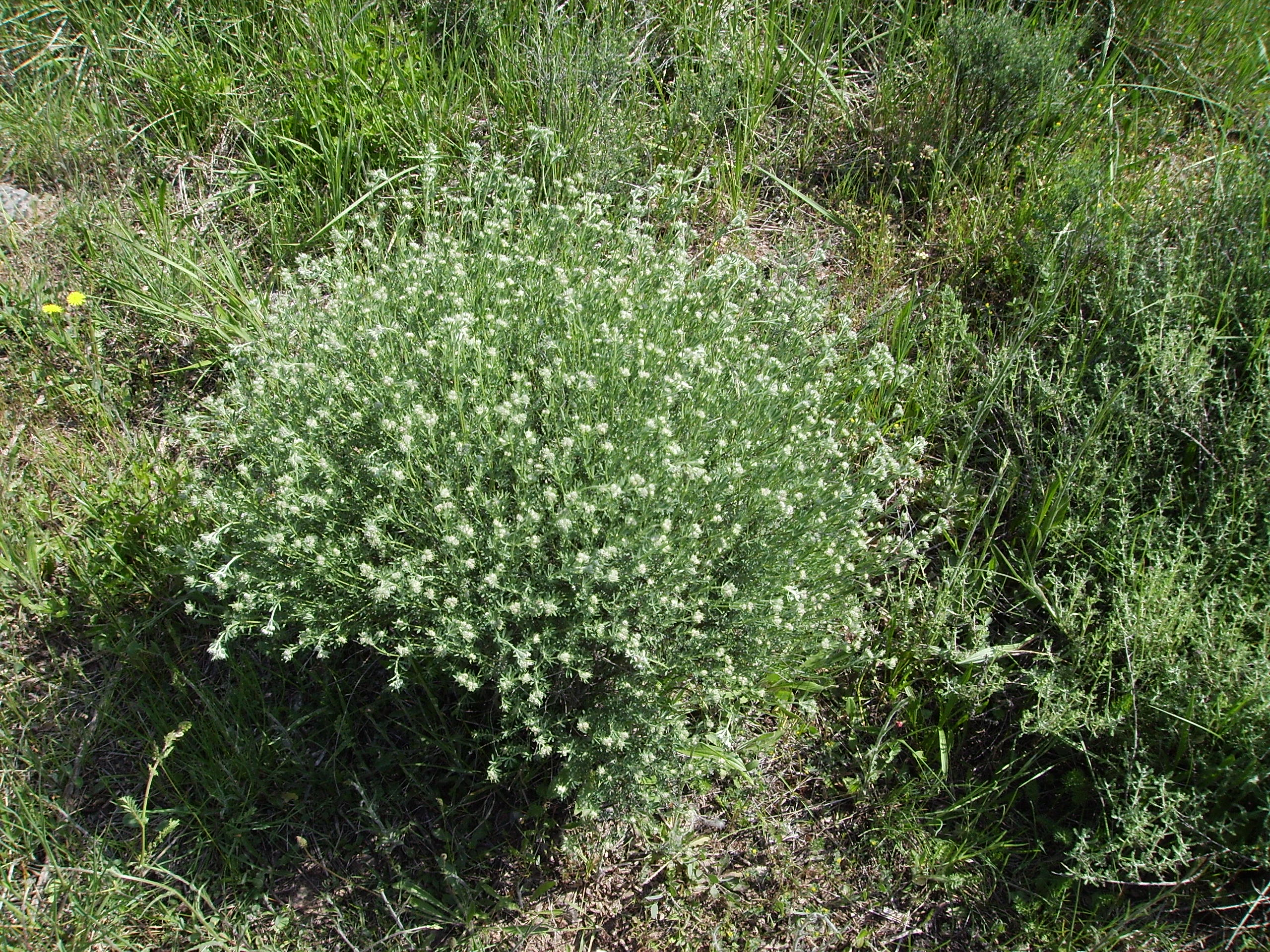
Plant

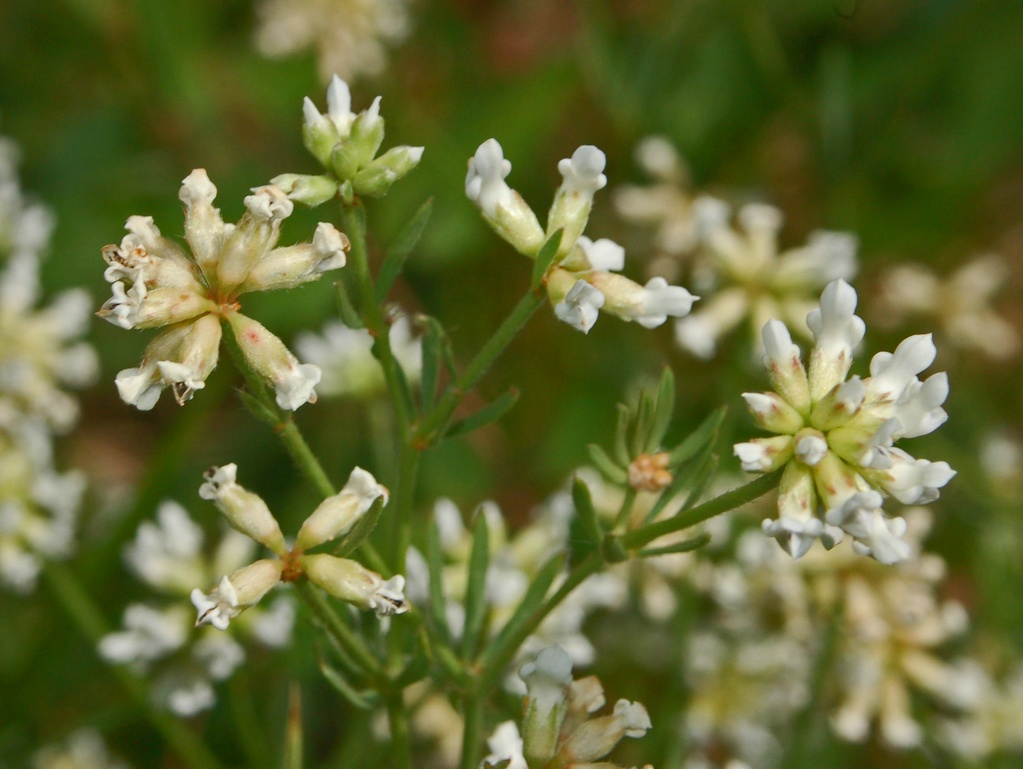
Flowers

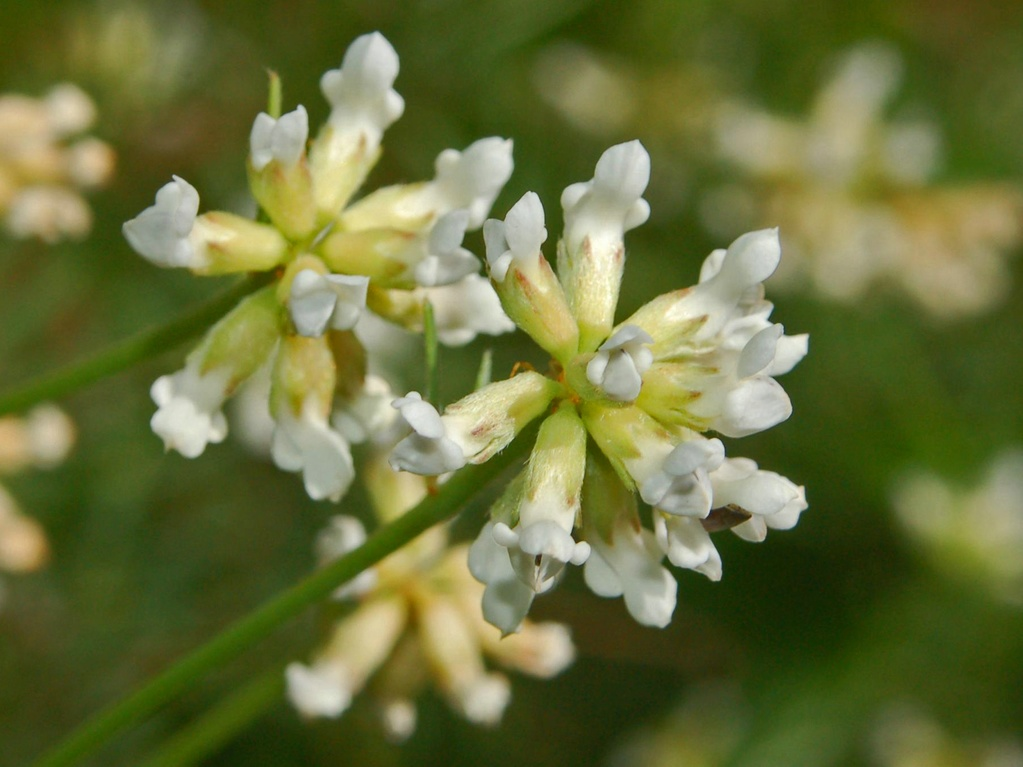
Flowers

== Distribution ==
Lotus dorycnium has a broadly Mediterranean distribution.

== Habitat ==
These plants prefer semi-arid hills, sunny and dry pastures and Mediterranean environment and tolerates all soil types. They can be found at an altitude of 0–1,300 metres (0–4,265 ft).
