= Syrmatium =

Genus of legumes

Syrmatium was a formerly accepted genus of flowering plants in the family Fabaceae (legumes), native to the southwestern United States. As of February 2021, it was considered a synonym of Acmispon by Plants of the World Online, and only Acmispon was recognized by the Jepson eFlora.

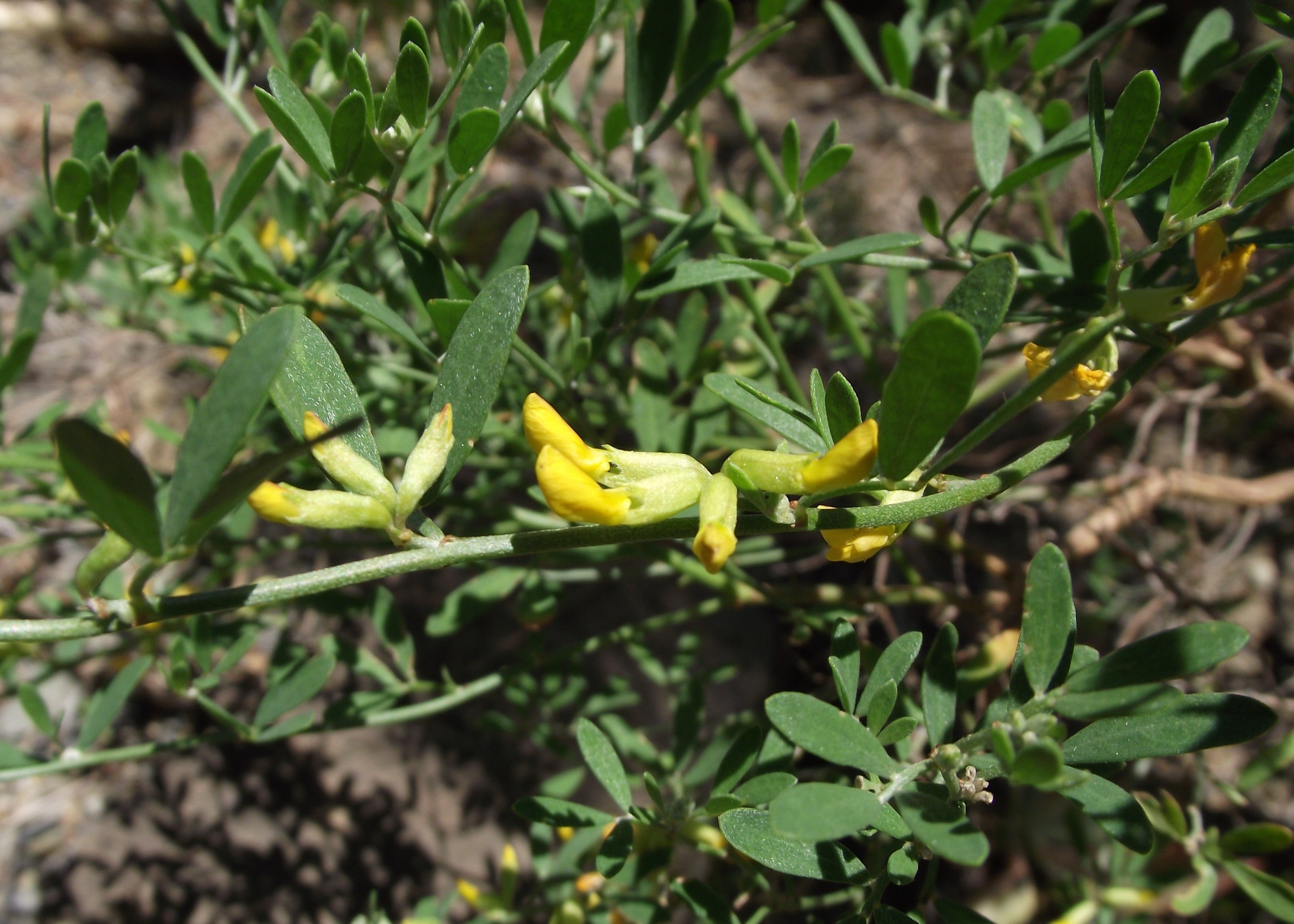
Acmispon dendroideus var. veatchii, formerly Syrmatium veatchii

== Taxonomy ==
Syrmatium belonged to a group of species traditionally placed in the tribe Loteae of the subfamily Faboideae. The taxonomy of this group is complex, and its division into genera has varied considerably. Many species of Syrmatium were formerly placed in a broadly defined genus Lotus. A molecular phylogenetic study in 2000 based on nuclear ribosomal ITS sequences confirmed the view that the "New World" (American) and "Old World" (African and Eurasian) species of Lotus did not belong in the same genus. Syrmatium was monophyletic.

=== Species ===
Species that have been placed in Syrmatium include:

- Syrmatium argophyllum (A.Gray) Greene = Acmispon argophyllus (A.Gray) Brouillet
- Syrmatium cytisoides (Benth.) Greene = Acmispon cytisoides (Benth.) Brouillet
- Syrmatium decumbens (Benth.) Greene = Acmispon decumbens (Benth.) Govaerts
- Syrmatium distichum Greene = Acmispon distichus (Greene) Brouillet
- Syrmatium haydonii (Orcutt) Brand = Acmispon haydonii (Orcutt) Brouillet
- Syrmatium junceum Benth.) Greene = Acmispon junceus (Benth.) Brouillet
- Syrmatium leucophyllum (Greene) Brand = Acmispon procumbens (Greene) Brouillet var. procumbens
- Syrmatium micranthum (Nutt. ex Torr. & A.Gray) Greene = Acmispon micranthus (Nutt. ex Torr. & A.Gray) Brouillet
- Syrmatium prostratum (Nutt.) Greene = Acmispon prostratus (Nutt.) Brouillet
- Syrmatium tomentosum (Hook. & Arn.) Vogel = Acmispon tomentosus (Hook. & Arn.) Govaerts
- Syrmatium veatchii (Greene) Greene = Acmispon dendroideus var. veatchii (Greene) Brouillet
- Syrmatium watsonii (Vasey & Rose) Brand = Hosackia alamosana Rose
