= San Tan Mountain Regional Park =

Park in Pinal County, Arizona

Coordinates: 33°10′4″N 111°38′8″W

San Tan Mountain Regional Park is a large rural/suburban park located in Pinal County. Although the park is administered by Maricopa County Parks, it is located within Pinal County. It encompasses over 10,000 acres and preserves a portion of the San Tan Mountains, south of Queen Creek.

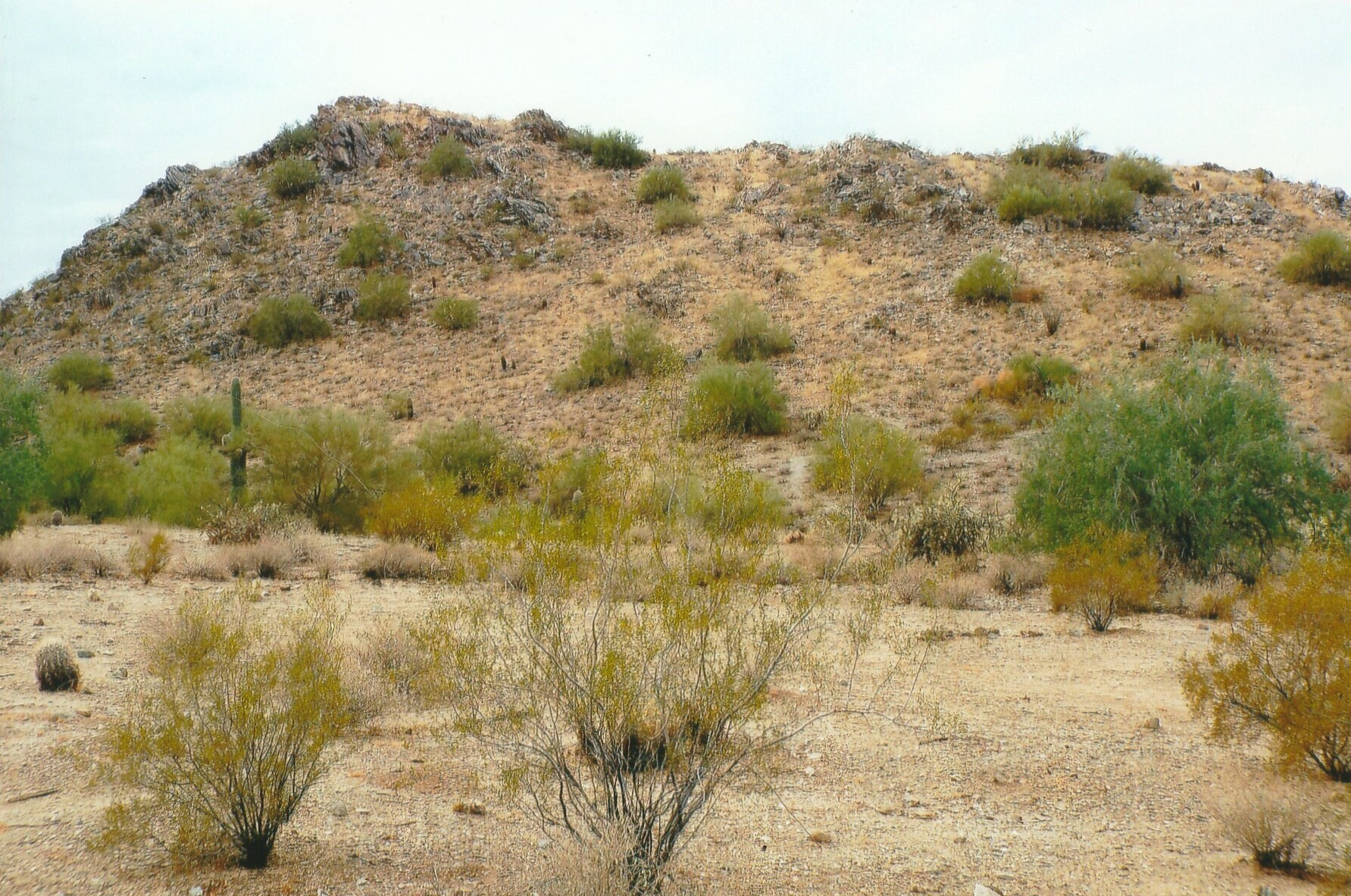
Gold Mountain in San Tan Mountain Regional Park

== Description ==
Comprising over 10,200 acres in the Sonoran Desert, the park sits south of Queen Creek Arizona and preserves a portion of the San Tan Mountains, located on their northeastern flank. It is located approximately 30 miles southeast of downtown Phoenix. Higley Basin is its northern border, while Chandler Heights sits to its northwest. The western and southern portions of the park are bordered by the Gila River Indian Reservation. The elevation of the park varies between 1,400 and 2,500 feet, with the highest point in the park situated in the Malpais Hills at 2,539 feet. Goldmine Mountain which sits in the northern section of the park, with the Malpais Hills in the south, between them sit an unnamed central highlands. These three mountain groups rise above the general plain of the park, which sits at 1500 feet.

Proterozoic and Laramide granites are the predominant geology of the park, while Mid-Tertiary sedimentary and volcanic rocks overlay Proterozoic and Cretaceous crystalline rocks in the central and eastern portions. The majority of exposed bedrock is either granite or schist, with rhyolitic volcanics existing in the northern Malpais Hills.

The climate consists of sweltering hot summers and cool mild winters, with average monthly temperatures ranging from a high of 104 degrees Fahrenheit in July to a low of 65.1 degrees in January. The park averages about 8.95 inches of rain per year, with almost 60% occurring with the June to September North American Monsoon season.

The vegetation varies from creosote flats to saguaro forest. Fauna includes many species of reptiles, birds, and mammals. The flora falls into the Sonoran Desert scrub category, in the Arizona Upland vegetation subdivision, the wettest subdivision of the category. Within the park the flora falls into 239 taxa, broken into 52 families, 171 genera and 238 species, with approximately 90% of the species being indigenous. The 10% of non-indigenous plants consist of 24 species. Almost 47% of the park's flora comes from five families: Asteraceae (35 genera, 42 species, 17.6%); Poaceae (20 genera, 26 species, 10.9%); Fabaceae (10 genera, 17 species, 7.1%); Boraginaceae (6 genera, 14 species, 5.9%); and Cactaceae (6 genera, 13 species, 5.4%). Some of the Asteraceae species include: San Felipe dogweed, Triangle-Leaf Bursage, Desert Broom, Desert Marigold, Brittlebush, Arizona Cottonrose, Burrobush, and Woollyhead neststraw. Examples of Poaceae include: Purple threeawn, Arizona brome, Red Brome, Bermuda Grass, desert fluff-grass, Bigelow's bluegrass, and Sixweeks fescue. Fabaceae is represented by Catclaw acacia, Coastal bird's-foot trefoil, hairy lotus, Mojave lupine, ironwood, Foothills paloverde, and Velvet Mesquite. Examples of Boraginaceae include: Common fiddleneck, Panamint cryptantha, broad-nutted comb bur, and Arizona popcornflower. The Cactaceae are represented by: saguaro, Buckhorn Cholla, teddy bear cholla, Engelmann's hedgehog cactus, and the barrel cactus.

The park is mostly used for recreational uses such as horseback riding, cycling, and hiking. In June 2003 a master plan was produced which called for development of the park to account for increased use, which will protect historical sites, vegetation and habitat. Special use areas will be created, and fencing to ward off sensitive areas, and closing off illegal access points. Trails and roads will be built or rehabilitated. The extensive mountain biking trails consist mainly of doubletrack trails. There is an educational area detailing the lives of the desert tortoise. As of 2022, there are nine multiuse trails in the park, most of which are open to hiking, cycling and horseback riding. They include the Little Leaf Trail (0.7 mile), Stargazer Trail (0.8 mile), the Hedgehog Trail (1 mile), Moonlight Trail (1.3 miles), and San Tan Trail (6.4 miles). The Goldmine Trail (2.5 miles) allows you to hike to the highest point in the park. The park has three entrances, on the north, east and south sides of the park. At the main entrance to the park off Phillips Road, there is a visitor center (built in 2005) with restrooms, a drinking fountain, indoor and outdoor desert-animal exhibits, and a small gift shop. The Goldmine entrance has parking and portable restrooms. The Rock Peak Wash trailhead has no services.

== History ==
Human presence in the area goes back to circa 1100-1450 A.D., the "classic period" of Hohokam history, consisting of rockpile fields located on large portions of the area. These are recognized as a sign of agricultural activity by the Hohokam, who most likely farmed agaves, yuccas, and chollas. With a few exceptions, the entire area was largely undeveloped before 1975. Those exceptions include minor prospecting, some cattle grazing, and a stagecoach trail.

In 1948 two prospectors, Mansel Carter and Marion Kennedy moved into the area. Carter was originally from Ohio, and after several different careers in his younger years which included piloting and logging, he moved to Gilbert in 1941, where he opened a camera shop. Kennedy was an American Indian from Oklahoma, where he attended the Indian School in Carlisle, Pennsylvania with Jim Thorpe. Initially they lived in a cave near the foot of Goldmine Mountain, prior to building a shanty outside the cave. The two made their living by mining small claims in the area, finding copper, silver, turquoise, and gold. Over the next dozen years they used the proceeds of their mining to file 55 claims, which are still owned by Carter's heirs. Kennedy died in 1960 at the age of 86. After his death, Carter continued to mine, but also began to whittle figurines out of local wood and cactus skeletons. Nicknamed the "Old Man of the Mountain", he died at the age of 85 in 1987.

The park was created in 1986 on approximately 6,800 acres owned by the United States Bureau of Land Management. An additional 3,400 acres owned by Maricopa County was incorporated into the park during the 1990s. The park is reached by paved roads; no roads or trails inside the park are paved except the area at the visitor center. The surrounding area consists mostly of agricultural fields, desert flats, low-lying hills, and housing developments.
