= Spanish clover =

Spanish clover is a common name for several flowering plants in the Fabaceae (pea) family and may refer to:

- Acmispon americanus
- Desmodium incanum, native to Central and South America
- Lotus purshianus
- Medicago sativa
- Trifolium gemellum, a species of Trifolium
