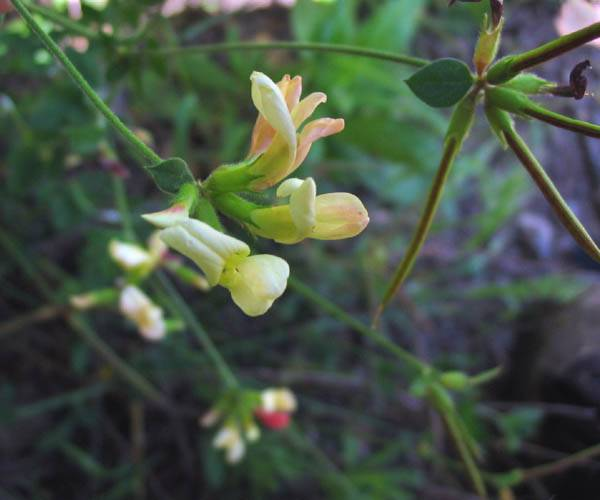

Scientific classification
- Kingdom: Plantae
- Clade: Tracheophytes
- Clade: Angiosperms
- Clade: Eudicots
- Clade: Rosids
- Order: Fabales
- Family: Fabaceae
- Subfamily: Faboideae
- Genus: Acmispon
- Species: A. grandiflorus

Binomial name
- Acmispon grandiflorus (Benth.) Brouillet

Synonyms
- Anisolotus grandiflorus (Benth.) A.Heller; Hosackia anthylloides (A.Gray) Millsp.; Hosackia confinis (Greene) Brand; Hosackia grandiflora Benth.; Hosackia guadalupensis (Greene) Brand; Hosackia leucophaea (Greene) Abrams; Hosackia occulta Greene; Hosackia ochroleuca Nutt.; Lotus confinis Greene; Lotus grandiflorus (Benth.) Greene; Lotus guadalupensis Greene; Lotus leucophaeus Greene; Lotus macranthus Greene; Ottleya grandiflora (Benth.) D.D.Sokoloff

= Acmispon grandiflorus =

Species of legume

Acmispon grandiflorus, synonym Lotus grandiflorus, is a species of legume native to western North America. It is known by the common name chaparral bird's-foot trefoil.

It is native to the west coast of North America from Washington to north-western Mexico, including California and Baja California, where it is found in many mountainous areas in the chaparral and coniferous forests.

== Description ==
Acmispon grandiflorus is a perennial herb taking an erect to decumbent form. It is lined with leaves each made up of oval leaflets 1 to 2 centimeters long and hairy to hairless in texture.

The inflorescence is made up 3 to 9 pealike flowers which may approach three centimeters long. The flower varies in color from whitish to yellow to pink.

The fruit is a legume pod up to 6 centimeters long.
