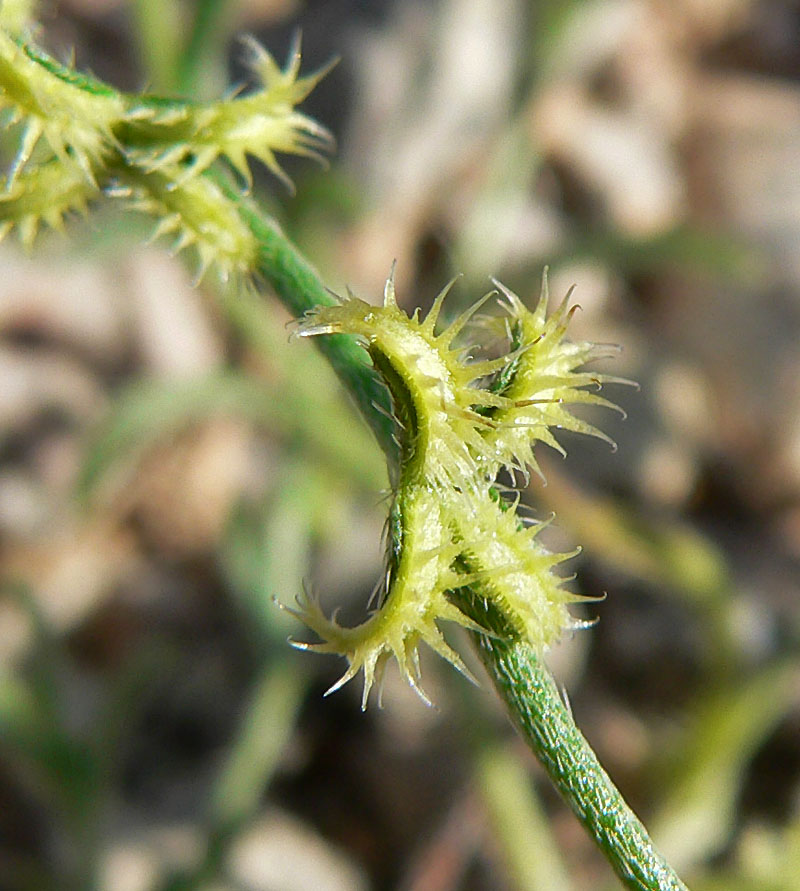
- Fruits

Scientific classification
- Kingdom: Plantae
- Clade: Tracheophytes
- Clade: Angiosperms
- Clade: Eudicots
- Clade: Asterids
- Order: Boraginales
- Family: Boraginaceae
- Genus: Pectocarya
- Species: P. recurvata

Binomial name
- Pectocarya recurvata I.M.Johnst.

= Pectocarya recurvata =

Species of flowering plant

Pectocarya recurvata is a species of flowering plant in the borage family known by the common names curvenut combseed and arched-nut pectocarya. It is native to the southwestern United States and northwestern Mexico, where it grows in many types of desert habitat. It is an annual herb producing a slender, rough-haired stem, generally upright to erect in form to a maximum height of about 21 centimeters. The small, pointed linear leaves alternately arranged along the stem. The inflorescence is a series of flowers, each on a curved pedicel. The flower has small green sepals and a rounded white corolla. The fruits, borne in groups of four, are curved nutlets fringed with flat teeth, each measuring 2.5 to 4 millimeters long.
