= Acmispon neomexicanus =

Scientific classification
- Kingdom: Plantae
- Clade: Tracheophytes
- Clade: Angiosperms
- Clade: Eudicots
- Clade: Rosids
- Order: Fabales
- Family: Fabaceae
- Subfamily: Faboideae
- Genus: Acmispon
- Species: A. neomexicanus

Binomial name
- Acmispon neomexicanus (Greene) Brouillet

Species of plant

Acmispon neomexicanus or Greene's trefoil is a flowering plant in the family Fabaceae that grows exclusively in Arizona, New Mexico and northern Mexico.

== Description ==
It is identified by very close hairy leaves and smooth flowers looking like small unclustered mustard yellow sweet peas. The seed pods are a distinct red color with hairs all along, and with an extremely hairy seed pod base.

== Habitat ==
This species grows in the dry shrubland biome.

== Conservation status ==
This species is not under threat.
