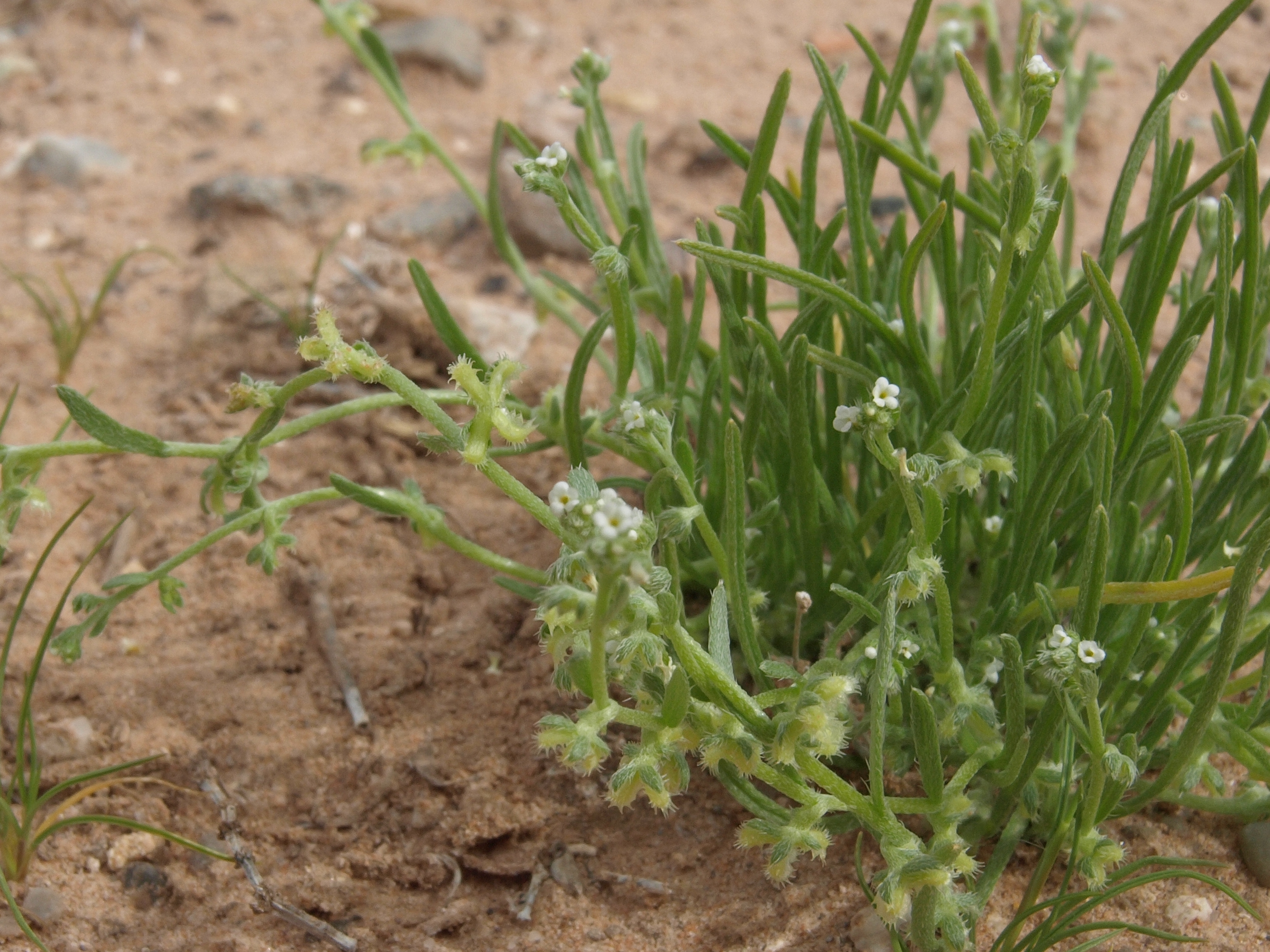
- Mixed combseed, Pectocarya heterocarpa, Lake Mead National Recreation Area, elevation 400 m (1310 ft)

Conservation status
- Secure (NatureServe)

Scientific classification
- Kingdom: Plantae
- Clade: Tracheophytes
- Clade: Angiosperms
- Clade: Eudicots
- Clade: Asterids
- Order: Boraginales
- Family: Boraginaceae
- Genus: Pectocarya
- Species: P. heterocarpa

Binomial name
- Pectocarya heterocarpa I.M.Johnst.

= Pectocarya heterocarpa =

Species of flowering plant

Pectocarya heterocarpa is a species of flowering plant in the borage family known by the common names chuckwalla combseed and mixed-nut pectocarya. It is native to the southwestern United States and northern Mexico, where it grows in desert, mountain and plateau habitat, in scrub, woodland, and open areas. This is an annual herb producing a slender, rough-haired stem prostrate or upright to a maximum length of about 25 centimeters. The small, pointed linear leaves are alternately arranged, widely spaced along the stem. The inflorescence is a series of flowers, each on a curved pedicel. The flower has small green sepals and tiny white petals. The fruit is an array of four nutlets each lined with comblike prickles.
