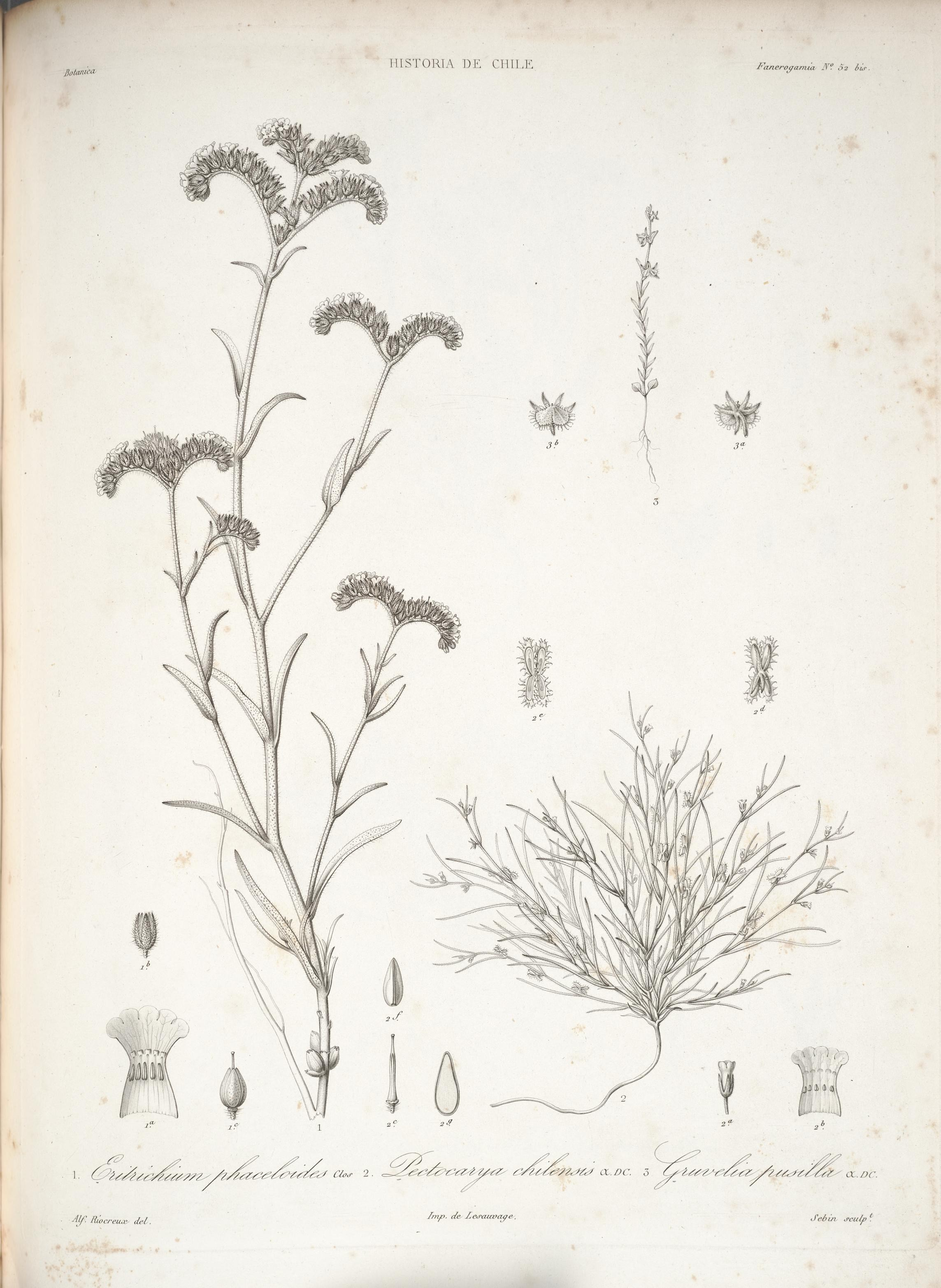

Scientific classification
- Kingdom: Plantae
- Clade: Tracheophytes
- Clade: Angiosperms
- Clade: Eudicots
- Clade: Asterids
- Order: Boraginales
- Family: Boraginaceae
- Genus: Pectocarya
- Species: P. pusilla

Binomial name
- Pectocarya pusilla (A.DC.) A.Gray

= Pectocarya pusilla =

Species of flowering plant

Pectocarya pusilla is a species of flowering plant in the borage family known by the common names little combseed and little pectocarya. It is native to the west coast of the United States from Washington to central California, where it grows in several habitat types, including disturbed areas such as roadsides. This is an annual herb producing a slender, rough-haired stem, generally upright to erect in form to a maximum height of about 38 centimeters. The small, pointed linear leaves are alternately arranged higher on the stem, and those lower on the stem are oppositely arranged and fused at the bases. The inflorescence is a series of flowers, each on a curved pedicel. The flower has small green sepals with short hooked hairs and a rounded white corolla. The fruit is an array of four flattened nutlets with fringes of comblike hairs.
