= Hammatolobium =

Scientific classification
- Kingdom: Plantae
- Clade: Tracheophytes
- Clade: Angiosperms
- Clade: Eudicots
- Clade: Rosids
- Order: Fabales
- Family: Fabaceae
- Subfamily: Faboideae
- Tribe: Loteae
- Genus: Hammatolobium; Fenzl (1842)

Species
- Hammatolobium kremerianum (Coss.) Müll.Berol.; Hammatolobium lotoides Fenzl

Synonyms
- Ludovicia Coss. (1856)

Genus of legumes

Hammatolobium is a genus of flowering plants in the legume family Fabaceae. It belongs to the subfamily Faboideae. It includes two species of herbaceous perennials native to the Mediterranean Basin.

- Hammatolobium kremerianum (Coss.) Müll.Berol. – Morocco and Algeria
- Hammatolobium lotoides Fenzl – southern Greece, Turkey, Syria, and Lebanon
