= Acmispon argyraeus =

Scientific classification
- Kingdom: Plantae
- Clade: Tracheophytes
- Clade: Angiosperms
- Clade: Eudicots
- Clade: Rosids
- Order: Fabales
- Family: Fabaceae
- Subfamily: Faboideae
- Genus: Acmispon
- Species: A. argyraeus

Binomial name
- Acmispon argyraeus (Greene) Brouillet

Synonyms
- Hosackia argyraea Greene; Lotus argyraeus Greene; Ottleya argyraea (Greene) D.D.Sokoloff

Species of legume

Acmispon argyraeus, synonym Lotus argyraeus, is a species of legume native to California and northwest Mexico. It is known by the common name canyon bird's-foot trefoil. It occurs in dry mountain habitats. It is a perennial herb composed of leaves, each made up of a few oval leaflike leaflets about 1 cm long. Most parts of the plant have a silky-hairy in texture. The inflorescence holds one to three pinkish-yellow flowers roughly 1 cm long. The fruit is a dehiscent legume pod up to 2.5 cm long.
