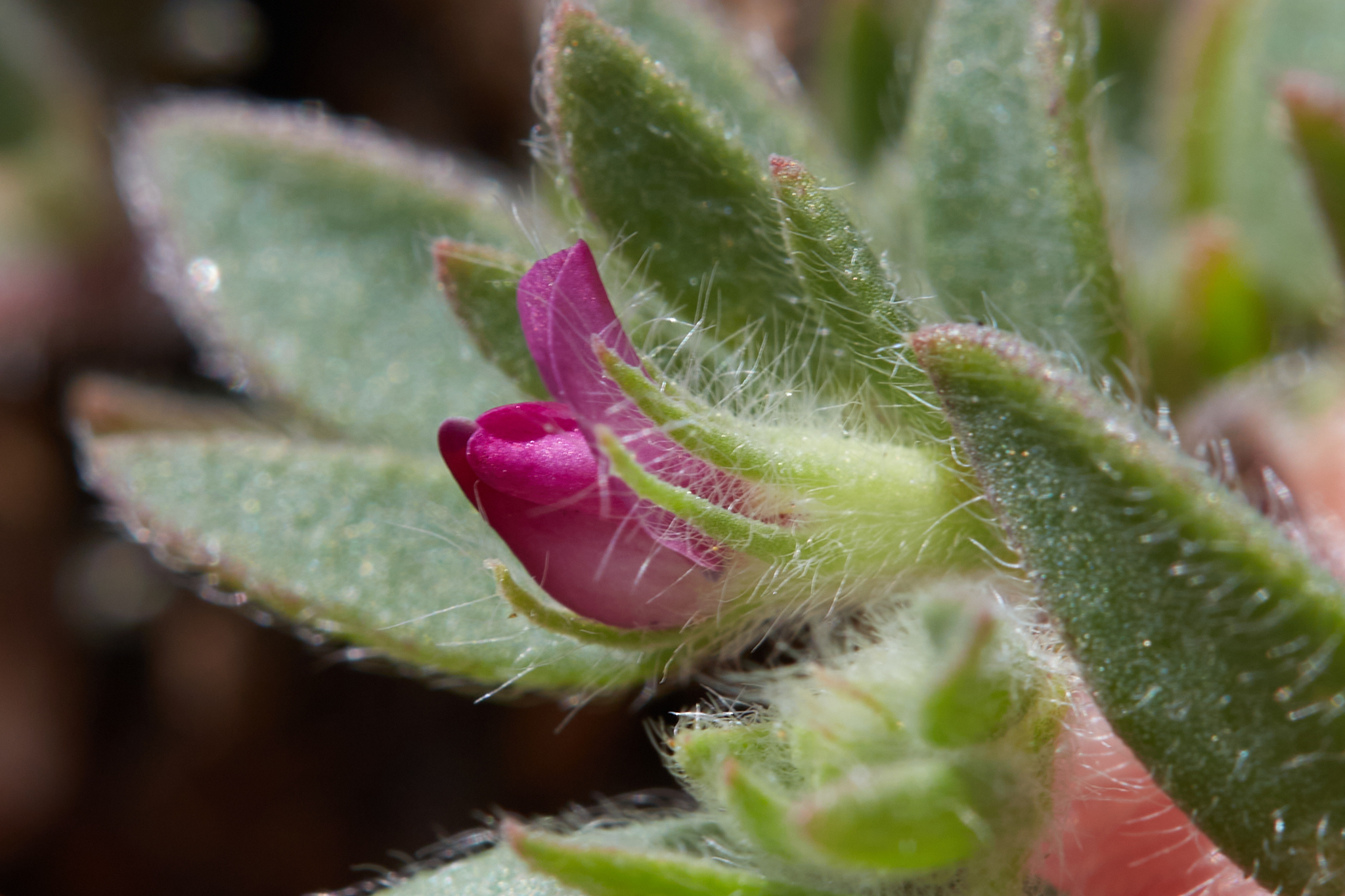
- Flower of Acmispon rubriflorus

Conservation status
- Imperiled (NatureServe)

Scientific classification
- Kingdom: Plantae
- Clade: Embryophytes
- Clade: Tracheophytes
- Clade: Angiosperms
- Clade: Eudicots
- Clade: Rosids
- Order: Fabales
- Family: Fabaceae
- Subfamily: Faboideae
- Genus: Acmispon
- Species: A. rubriflorus

Binomial name
- Acmispon rubriflorus (H.Sharsm.) D.D.Sokoloff

Synonyms
- Lotus rubriflorus H.Sharsm.

= Acmispon rubriflorus =

Species of legume

Acmispon rubriflorus, synonym Lotus rubriflorus, is a species of legume endemic to California. It is known by the common name red-flowered bird's-foot trefoil. It is known from only four occurrences with a disjunct distribution.

== Location ==
There are two occurrences in eastern Stanislaus County, California, near Mount Boardman, and the other two occurrences are in Colusa and Tehama Counties over 100 miles to the north. The plant's habitat is grassland and woodland.

== Description ==
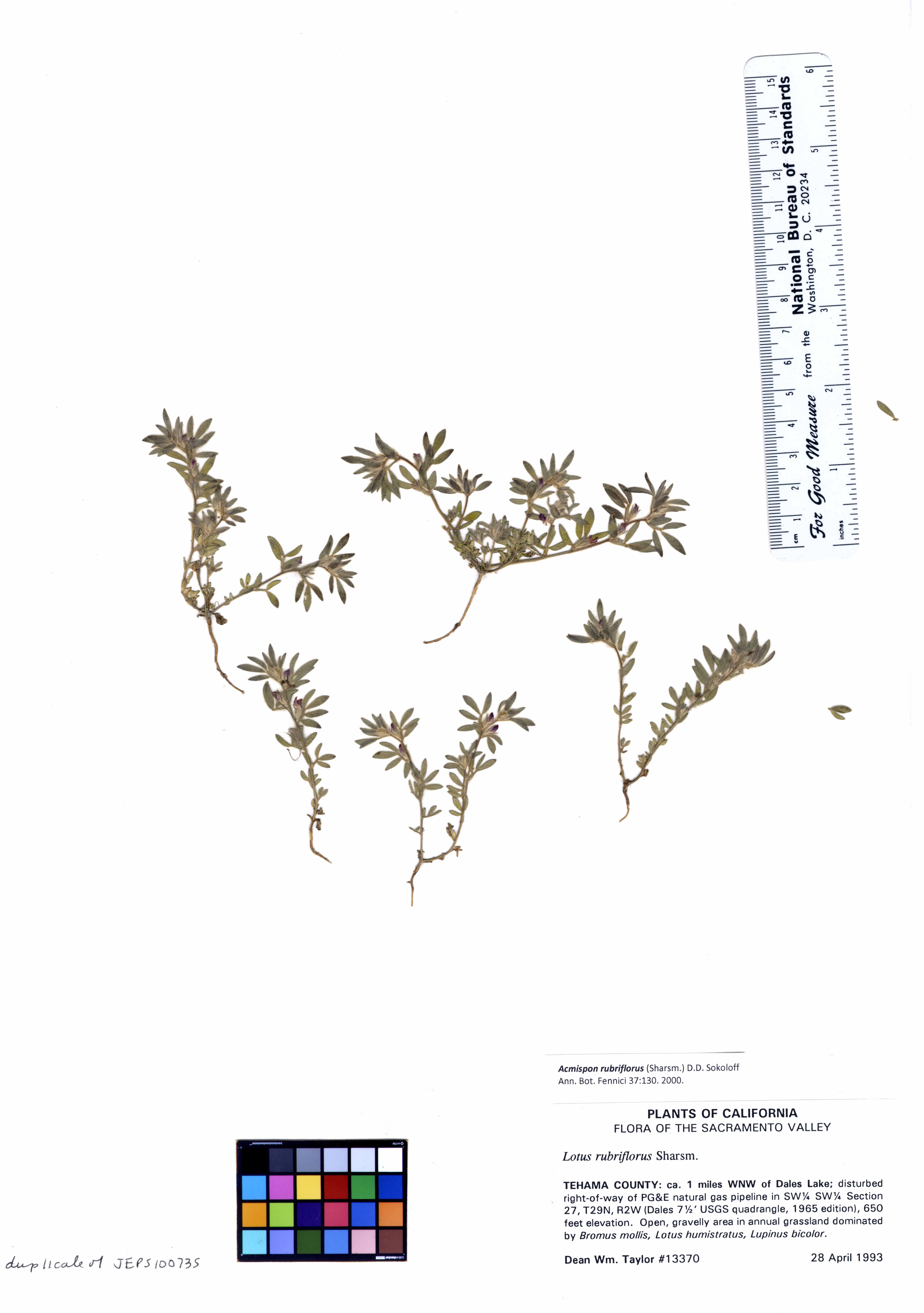
Herbarium specimen of Acmispon rubriflorus

This is a petite annual herb spreading in a small patch on the ground. Its slender branches are lined with leaves each made up of about 4 hairy lance-shaped leaflets. Solitary magenta flowers appear in the leaf axils, each minute pea-shaped bloom just a few millimeters wide. The fruit is a hairy legume pod which may approach a centimeter in length.
