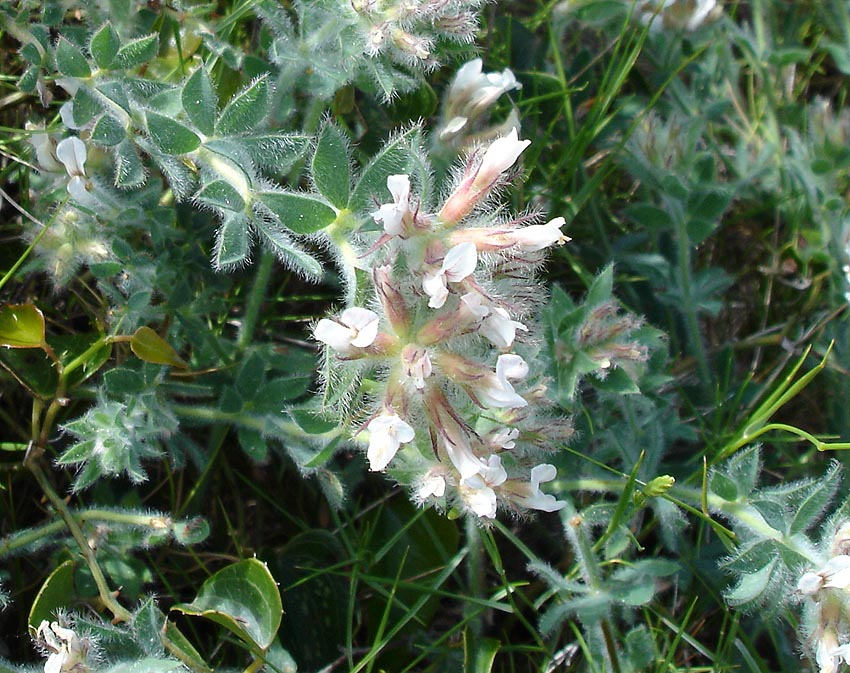
- Lotus hirsutus

Scientific classification
- Kingdom: Plantae
- Clade: Tracheophytes
- Clade: Angiosperms
- Clade: Eudicots
- Clade: Rosids
- Order: Fabales
- Family: Fabaceae
- Subfamily: Faboideae
- Clade: Meso-Papilionoideae
- Clade: Non-protein amino acid-accumulating clade
- Clade: Hologalegina
- Clade: Robinioids
- Tribe: Loteae; DC.

Synonyms
- Coronilleae

= Loteae =

Tribe of legumes

The tribe Loteae is a subdivision of the plant family Fabaceae, in the Robinioids. These genera are recognized by the USDA:

- Acmispon Raf. 1832
- Anthyllis L. 1753
- Antopetitia A.Rich. 1840
- Coronilla L. 1753
- Cytisopsis Jaub. & Spach 1844
- Dorycnium Mill. 1754 – included in Lotus
- Dorycnopsis Boiss. 1839 (Note: Possibly synonymous with Anthyllis)
- Hammatolobium Fenzl 1842
- Hippocrepis L. 1753—horseshoe vetches
- Hosackia Douglas ex Lindl. 1829 (Note: Possibly synonymous with Lotus)
- Hymenocarpos Savi
- Kebirita Kramina & D.D.Sokoloff 2001
- Lotus L. 1753—bird's-foot trefoils
- Ornithopus L. 1753
- Ottleya D.D.Sokoloff 1999 (Note: Possibly synonymous with Acmispon)
- Podolotus Royle 1835
- Pseudolotus Rech.f. 1958
- Scorpiurus L. 1753—scorpion's tails
- Securigera DC. 1805 (Note: Possibly synonymous with Coronilla)—crown vetches
- Syrmatium Vogel 1836
- Tetragonolobus Scop. 1772
- Tripodion Medik. 1787
- Vermifrux J.B.Gillett 1966
