= Acmispon haydonii =

Conservation status
- Vulnerable (NatureServe)

Scientific classification
- Kingdom: Plantae
- Clade: Tracheophytes
- Clade: Angiosperms
- Clade: Eudicots
- Clade: Rosids
- Order: Fabales
- Family: Fabaceae
- Subfamily: Faboideae
- Genus: Acmispon
- Species: A. haydonii

Binomial name
- Acmispon haydonii (Orcutt) Brouillet

Synonyms
- Hosackia haydonii Orcutt; Lotus haydonii (Orcutt) Greene; Lotus spencerae J.F.Macbr.; Syrmatium haydonii (Orcutt) Brand

Species of legume

Acmispon haydonii, synonyms Lotus haydonii and Syrmatium haydonii, is a species of legume native to California It is known by the common names pygmy lotus, rock bird's-foot trefoil and Haydon's lotus.

It is native to the dry mountain slopes and deserts of southern California, mainly the deserts of eastern San Diego County, where it grows in scrub and woodland habitat. It is a small bushy perennial herb spreading with mostly naked, slender stems. The sparse leaves are made up of usually three tiny leaflets and are deciduous. The inflorescence is generally made up of one or two yellow to reddish pealike flowers each under a centimeter long. The fruit is a curved legume pod also under a centimeter long.

== Taxonomy ==
The species was first described in 1889 by Charles Russell Orcutt as Hosackia haydonii. It was subsequently transferred to Lotus by Greene in 1890, to Syrmatium by August Brand in 1898 and independently by Amos Arthur Heller in 1913, and to Acmispon by Luc Brouillet in 2008.
