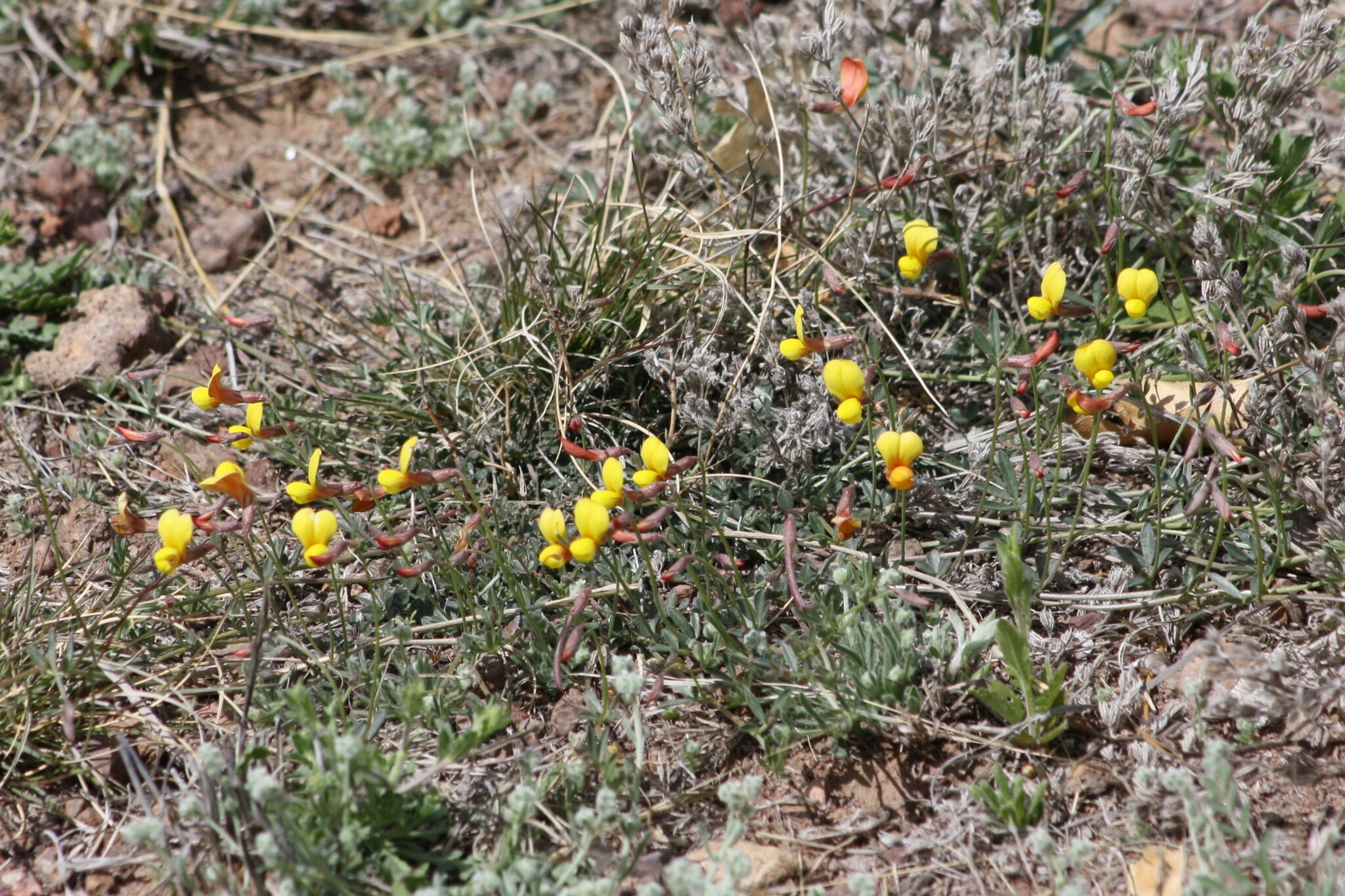

Scientific classification
- Kingdom: Plantae
- Clade: Tracheophytes
- Clade: Angiosperms
- Clade: Eudicots
- Clade: Rosids
- Order: Fabales
- Family: Fabaceae
- Subfamily: Faboideae
- Genus: Acmispon
- Species: A. oroboides

Binomial name
- Acmispon oroboides (Kunth) Brouillet

Synonyms
- Anil ehrenbergiana (Steud.) Kuntze; Anil hippocrepoides (Schltdl.) Kuntze; Anisolotus puberulus (Benth.) Wooton & Standl.; Cracca oroboides (Kunth) Kuntze; Hosackia angustifolia G. Don; Hosackia mexicana Benth.; Hosackia puberula Benth.; Indigofera ehrenbergiana Steud.; Lotus oroboides (Kunth) Ottley; Lotus puberulus (Benth.) Greene; Ottleya oroboides (Kunth) D.D. Sokoloff; Tephrosia oroboides Kunth

= Acmispon oroboides =

Species of flowering plant

Acmispon oroboides, the New Mexico bird's-foot trefoil, is a species of flowering plant native to the southwestern United States and northern Mexico.

== Description ==
Acmispon oroboides is a small perennial legume. It has multiple stems that keep low to the ground. The flowers bloom between February and July. They are typical in shape of the pea family, with yellow petals and red backsides.

== Distribution and habitat ==
Acmispon oroboides is found in the southwestern United States and northern Mexico. It grows between 3,500 ft and 5,000 ft in dry desert soils and around desert shrub to pinyon-juniper communities.
