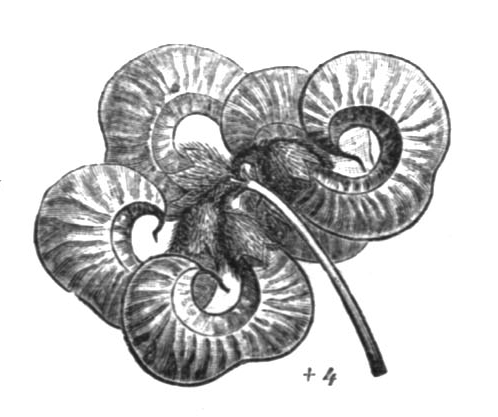
- Dorycnopsis abyssinica

Scientific classification
- Kingdom: Plantae
- Clade: Embryophytes
- Clade: Tracheophytes
- Clade: Angiosperms
- Clade: Eudicots
- Clade: Rosids
- Order: Fabales
- Family: Fabaceae
- Subfamily: Faboideae
- Tribe: Loteae
- Genus: Dorycnopsis; Boiss. (1839)

Synonyms
- Helminthocarpon A.Rich. (1848), nom illeg.; Vermifrux J.B.Gillett (1966)

= Dorycnopsis =

Genus of flowering plants

Dorycnopsis is a genus of flowering plants in the legume family Fabaceae. It belongs to the subfamily Faboideae. It includes two species of subshrubs, one native to southwestern Europe and Morocco, and the other native to the Horn of Africa and Yemen.

- Dorycnopsis abyssinica (A.Rich.) V.N.Tikhom. & D.D.Sokoloff – northeastern tropical Africa (Eritrea, Ethiopia, Somalia, and Sudan) and Yemen
- Dorycnopsis gerardi (L.) Boiss. – southwestern Europe (Italy, Sardinia, France, Corsica, Spain, and Portugal) and Morocco
