= Pectocarya peninsularis =

Scientific classification
- Kingdom: Plantae
- Clade: Tracheophytes
- Clade: Angiosperms
- Clade: Eudicots
- Clade: Asterids
- Order: Boraginales
- Family: Boraginaceae
- Genus: Pectocarya
- Species: P. peninsularis

Binomial name
- Pectocarya peninsularis I.M.Johnst.

Species of flowering plant

Pectocarya peninsularis is a species of flowering plant in the borage family known by the common names Baja pectocarya and peninsular pectocarya. It is native to the Sonoran Desert of California and Baja California, where it grows in open desert habitat, including disturbed areas. This is an annual herb producing a slender, rough-haired stem, decumbent or upright form to a maximum length of about 24 centimeters. The small, pointed linear leaves are alternately arranged, widely spaced along the stem. The inflorescence is a series of flowers, each on a curved pedicel. The flower has small green sepals and tiny white petals. The fruit is an array of four nutlets each lined with comblike prickles, those higher on the plant arranged in pairs and the lower ones unpaired.
