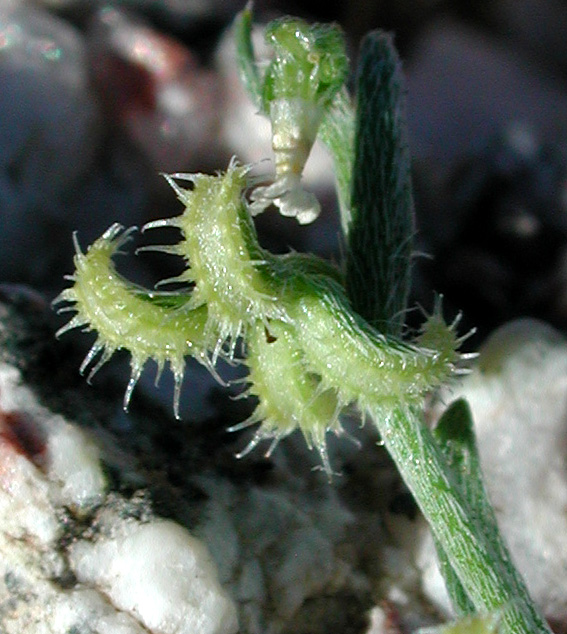
- Pectocarya recurvata (fruit)

Scientific classification
- Kingdom: Plantae
- Clade: Embryophytes
- Clade: Tracheophytes
- Clade: Spermatophytes
- Clade: Angiosperms
- Clade: Eudicots
- Clade: Asterids
- Order: Boraginales
- Family: Boraginaceae
- Subfamily: Boraginoideae
- Genus: Pectocarya; DC. ex Meisn.

Species
- 13; see text

Synonyms
- Ctenospermum Post & Kuntze (1903), nom. nud.; Gruvelia A.DC. (1846); Ktenospermum Lehm. (1837)

= Pectocarya =

Genus of flowering plants in the borage family

Pectocarya is a plant genus of about 15 species in the family Boraginaceae. Plants in this genus are known generally as combseeds. They are small annual plants which bear tiny white flowers no more than 3 millimeters in diameter. Their fruits are nutlets which often have small projections that look like the teeth of a comb, hence their common name. The nutlets usually come in clusters of four. These plants are found mainly in western North America.

== Species ==
13 species are accepted.

- Pectocarya anisocarpa Veno
- Pectocarya anomala I.M.Johnst.
- Pectocarya boliviana (I.M.Johnst.) I.M.Johnst.
- Pectocarya dimorpha (I.M.Johnst.) I.M.Johnst.
- Pectocarya heterocarpa (I.M.Johnst.) I.M.Johnst. – chuckwalla combseed
- Pectocarya lateriflora (Lam.) DC.
- Pectocarya linearis (Ruiz & Pav.) DC. – sagebrush combseed
- Pectocarya penicillata A.DC. – sleeping combseed, winged combseed, shortleaf combseed
- Pectocarya peninsularis I.M.Johnst. – peninsula combseed
- Pectocarya platycarpa (Munz & I.M.Johnst.) Munz & I.M.Johnst. – broadfruit combseed
- Pectocarya pusilla (A.DC.) A.Gray – little combseed, purple prairieclover
- Pectocarya recurvata I.M.Johnst. – curvenut combseed, combbur
- Pectocarya setosa A.Gray – moth combseed
