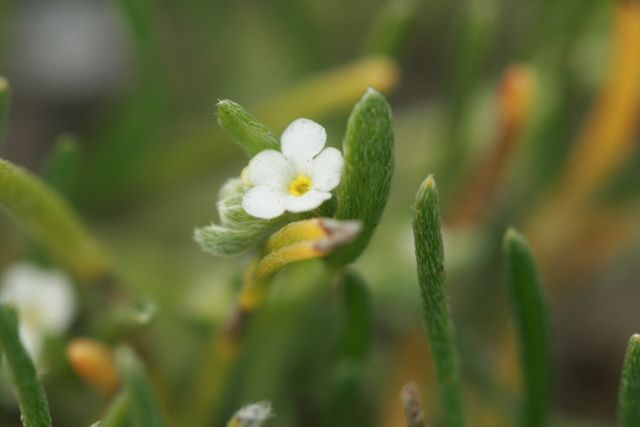

Conservation status
- Secure (NatureServe)

Scientific classification
- Kingdom: Plantae
- Clade: Tracheophytes
- Clade: Angiosperms
- Clade: Eudicots
- Clade: Asterids
- Order: Boraginales
- Family: Boraginaceae
- Genus: Pectocarya
- Species: P. penicillata

Binomial name
- Pectocarya penicillata (Hook. & Arn.) A.DC.

= Pectocarya penicillata =

Species of flowering plant

Pectocarya penicillata is a species of flowering plant in the borage family known by the common names sleeping combseed, shortleaf combseed, winged combseed and northern pectocarya. It is native to much of western North America from British Columbia to Wyoming to Baja California, where it grows in many types of habitat, including disturbed areas such as roadsides. This is an annual herb producing a slender, rough-haired stem, mostly decumbent in form, to a maximum length of about 25 centimeters. The small, pointed linear leaves are alternately arranged, widely spaced along the stem. The inflorescence is a series of flowers, each on a curved pedicel. The flower has small green sepals and tiny white petals. The fruit is an array of four nutlets each lined with comblike prickles.
