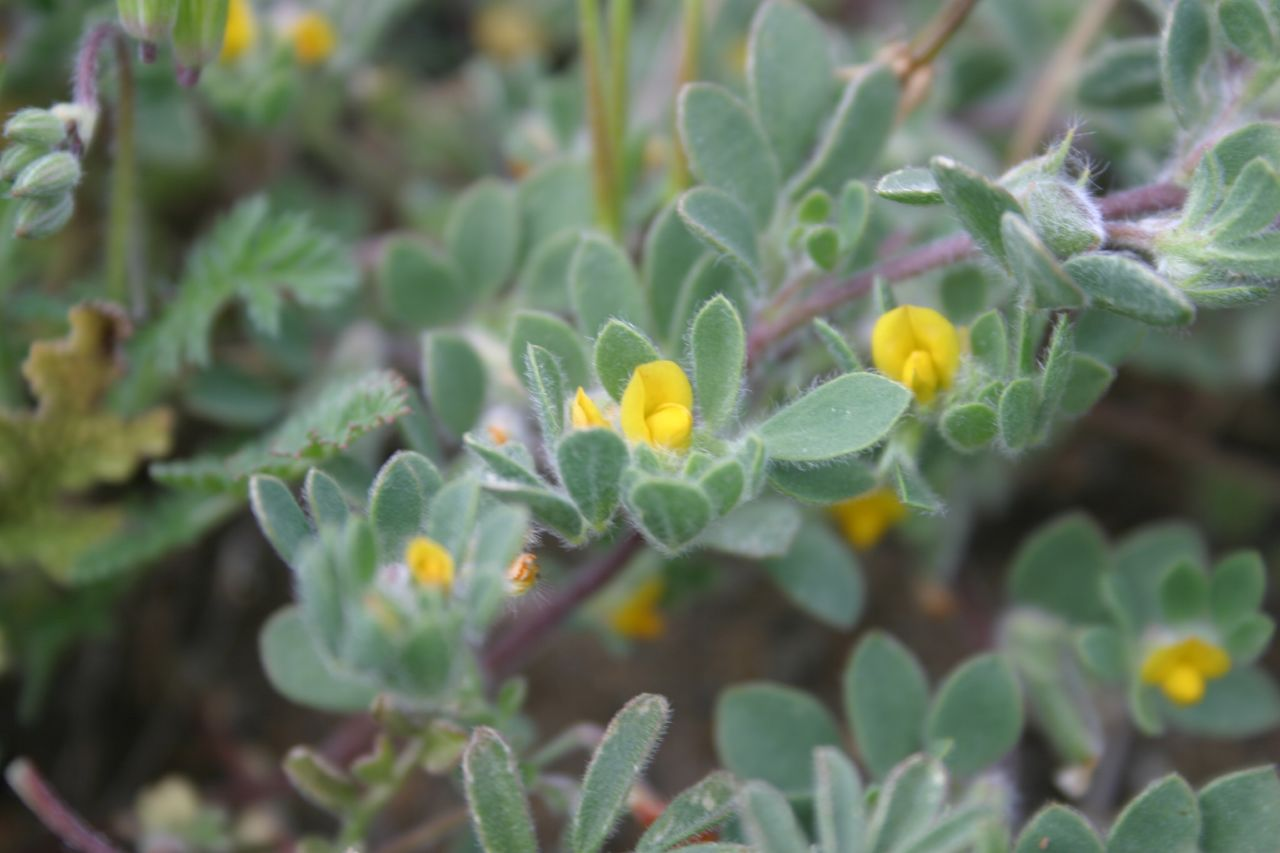

Scientific classification
- Kingdom: Plantae
- Clade: Tracheophytes
- Clade: Angiosperms
- Clade: Eudicots
- Clade: Rosids
- Order: Fabales
- Family: Fabaceae
- Subfamily: Faboideae
- Genus: Acmispon
- Species: A. brachycarpus

Binomial name
- Acmispon brachycarpus (Benth.) D.D.Sokoloff

Synonyms
- Anisolotus brachycarpus (Benth.) Rydb.; Anisolotus trispermus (Greene) Wooton & Standl.; Hosackia brachycarpa Benth.; Hosackia trisperma (Greene) Brand; Lotus humistratus Greene; Lotus trispermus Greene

= Acmispon brachycarpus =

Species of legume

Acmispon brachycarpus (formerly Lotus humistratus) is a species of legume known by the common name foothill deervetch. It is native to western North America from Idaho to Texas to northern Mexico, where it is known from many types of habitat. It is an annual herb spreading upright or taking a clumpy or matted form. It is lined with leaves each usually made up of four hairy, somewhat fleshy leaflets each up to about 1 cm long. Solitary yellow, pea-like flowers appear in the leaf axils. The fruit is a legume pod variable in size and shape.
