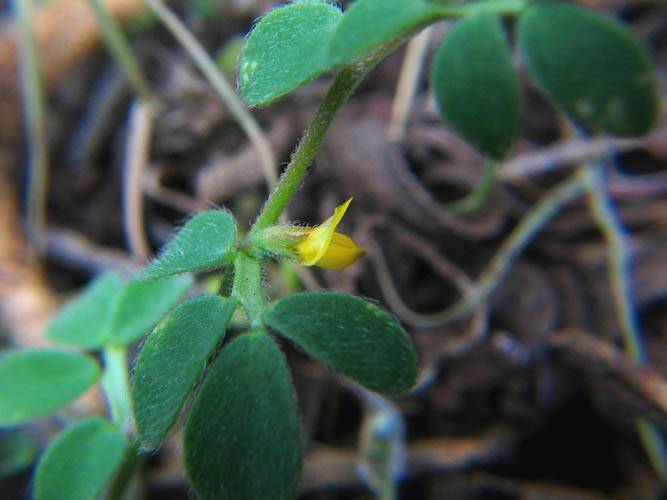

Conservation status
- Apparently Secure (NatureServe)

Scientific classification
- Kingdom: Plantae
- Clade: Tracheophytes
- Clade: Angiosperms
- Clade: Eudicots
- Clade: Rosids
- Order: Fabales
- Family: Fabaceae
- Subfamily: Faboideae
- Genus: Acmispon
- Species: A. wrangelianus

Binomial name
- Acmispon wrangelianus (Fisch. & C.A.Mey.) D.D.Sokoloff

Synonyms
- Anisolotus wrangeliana (Fisch. & C.A.Mey.) Bernh.; Lotus subpinnatus var. wrangelianus (Fisch. & C.A.Mey.) Jeps.; Lotus wrangelianus Fisch. & C.A.Mey.

= Acmispon wrangelianus =

Species of legume

Acmispon wrangelianus is a species of legume native to California and Oregon in the southwestern United States. It is known by the common names Chilean bird's-foot trefoil and Chile lotus. Despite its common name, it is not from Chile. It can be found in many types of habitat, including disturbed areas. This is a hairy, prostrate annual herb. Its slender branches are lined with leaves each made of generally four small leaflets. The inflorescence is composed of a solitary yellow pealike flower around a centimeter wide. The fruit is a legume pod one to two centimeters (0.39 to 0.79 in) long.
