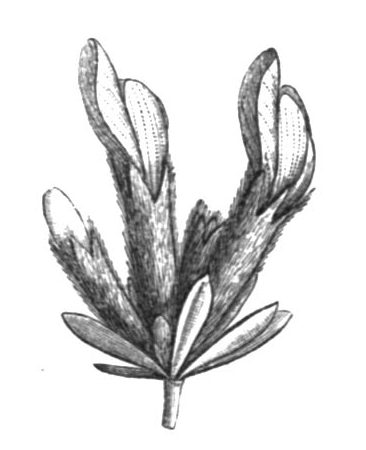
- Cytisopsis pseudocytisus

Scientific classification
- Kingdom: Plantae
- Clade: Tracheophytes
- Clade: Angiosperms
- Clade: Eudicots
- Clade: Rosids
- Order: Fabales
- Family: Fabaceae
- Subfamily: Faboideae
- Tribe: Loteae
- Genus: Cytisopsis; Jaub. & Spach (1844)

Species
- Cytisopsis ahmedii (Batt. & Pit.) Lassen; Cytisopsis pseudocytisus (Boiss.) Fertig

Synonyms
- Lyauteya Maire (1919)

= Cytisopsis =

Genus of legumes

Cytisopsis is a genus of flowering plants in the legume family, Fabaceae. It belongs to subfamily Faboideae. It contains two species, native to Morocco and the eastern Mediterranean.

- Cytisopsis ahmedii (Batt. & Pit.) Lassen – a shrub endemic to Morocco
- Cytisopsis pseudocytisus (Boiss.) Fertig – a subshrub native to the eastern Mediterranean, from southern and southeastern Turkey to Israel. It is an ingredient in the herbal tea, zahraa, in the Unani medicine tradition of Syria.
