= Acmispon denticulatus =

Scientific classification
- Kingdom: Plantae
- Clade: Tracheophytes
- Clade: Angiosperms
- Clade: Eudicots
- Clade: Rosids
- Order: Fabales
- Family: Fabaceae
- Subfamily: Faboideae
- Genus: Acmispon
- Species: A. denticulatus

Binomial name
- Acmispon denticulatus (Drew) D.D.Sokoloff

Species of legume

Acmispon denticulatus (previously Lotus denticulatus) is a species of legume known by the common name riverbar bird's-foot trefoil. It is native to western North America from British Columbia to California to Utah, where it grows in moist spots in a number of habitat types. It is an annual herb growing erect or spreading to about 40 cm in maximum length. It is lined with leaves each made up of a few alternately arranged oval leaflets 1 to 2 cm long, sometimes slightly hairy in texture. The inflorescence is made up of one or two whitish to yellowish pealike flowers located in leaf axils. The fruit is a hairy legume pod up to about 1.5 cm long.
