= Acmispon mearnsii =

Conservation status
- Vulnerable (NatureServe)

Scientific classification
- Kingdom: Plantae
- Clade: Embryophytes
- Clade: Tracheophytes
- Clade: Spermatophytes
- Clade: Angiosperms
- Clade: Eudicots
- Clade: Rosids
- Order: Fabales
- Family: Fabaceae
- Subfamily: Faboideae
- Genus: Acmispon
- Species: A. mearnsii

Binomial name
- Acmispon mearnsii (Britton) Brouillet

Synonyms
- Anisolotus mearnsii (Greene) A.Heller; Hosackia mearnsii Britton; Lotus mearnsii (Britton) Greene; Ottleya mearnsii (Britton) D.D.Sokoloff

Species of legume

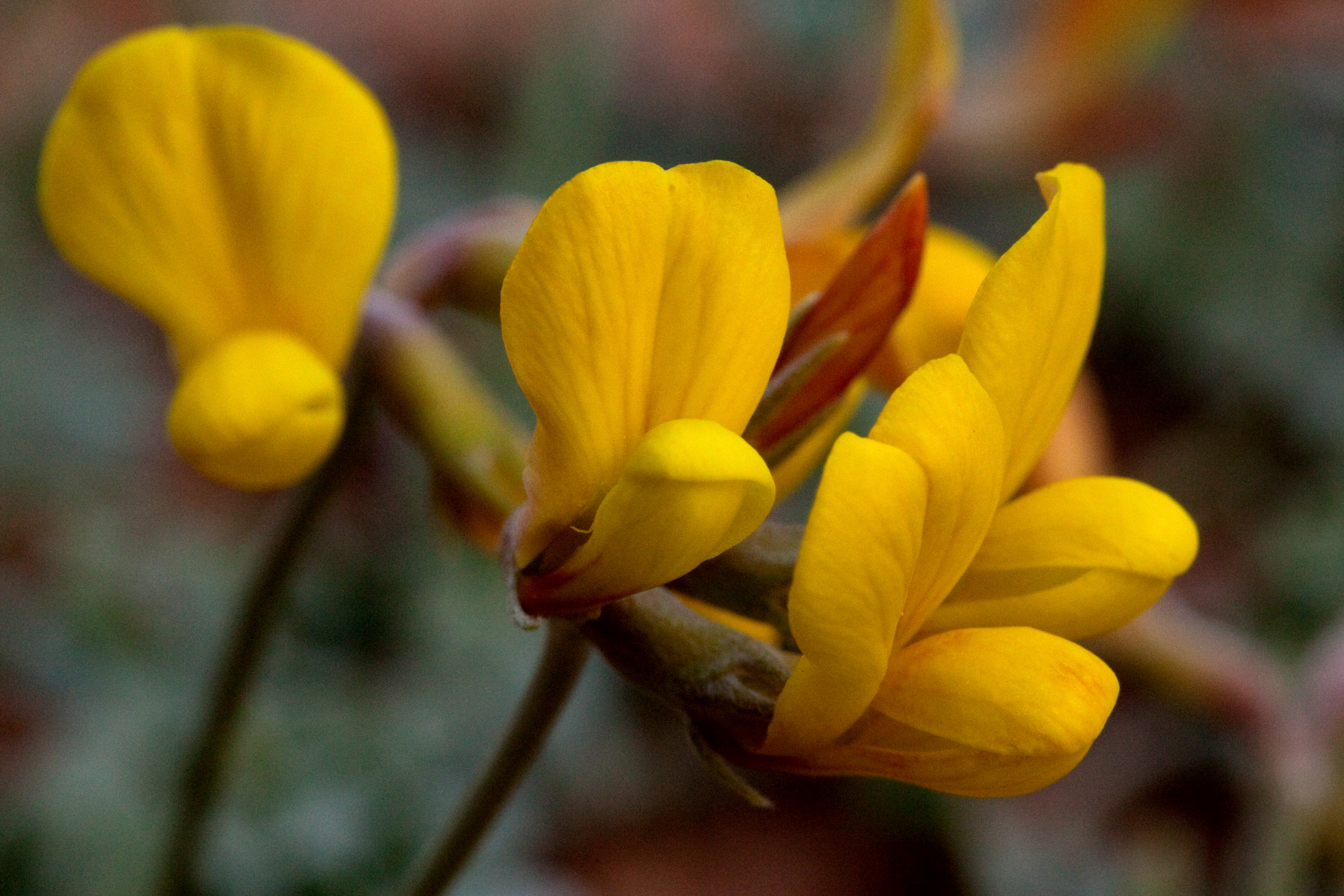
Acmispon mearnsii in Yavapa County, Arizona

Acmispon mearnsii, synonym Lotus mearnsii, is a species of flowering plant in the legume family endemic to Arizona in the United States. It known by the common name Mearns' bird's-foot trefoil. In Arizona, it occurs in Coconino, Navajo, and Yavapai Counties.
