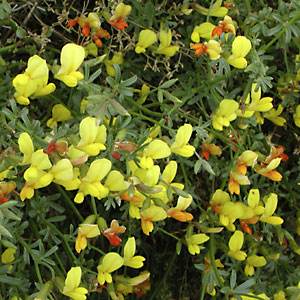

Scientific classification
- Kingdom: Plantae
- Clade: Tracheophytes
- Clade: Angiosperms
- Clade: Eudicots
- Clade: Rosids
- Order: Fabales
- Family: Fabaceae
- Subfamily: Faboideae
- Genus: Acmispon
- Species: A. rigidus

Binomial name
- Acmispon rigidus (Benth.) Brouillet (2008)

Synonyms
- Anisolotus argensis (Coult.) A.Heller (1913); Anisolotus rigidus (Benth.) Rydb. (1906); Hosackia puberula A.Gray (1853), nom. illeg.; Hosackia rigida Benth. (1849); Lotus argensis Coult. (1893); Lotus rigidus (Benth.) Greene (1890); Ottleya rigida (Benth.) D.D.Sokoloff (1999)

= Acmispon rigidus =

Species of legume

Acmispon rigidus, synonyms Lotus rigidus and Ottleya rigida, is a flowering plant in the pea family (Fabaceae), native to the southwestern United States and northwestern Mexico. It is known as shrubby deervetch or desert rock-pea. It is found in the Mojave Desert and Sonoran Desert.

== Description ==
It is a perennial herbaceous plant growing to 0.5–1.5 m tall. The leaves are irregularly pinnate or palmate with three or five leaflets, 5–17 mm long. The flowers are yellow to cream, turning red or purple as they age.

== Distribution and habitat ==
Acmispon rigidus is found in the southwestern United States (Arizona, California, Nevada and Utah) and in northwestern Mexico. It occurs in the Mojave Desert north to Inyo County, California, and in the Sonoran Desert south to the Baja California Peninsula. It is found on dry slopes and desert dry washes below 6,000 ft above sea level, in Joshua tree woodland, and in pinyon-juniper woodland plant communities.
