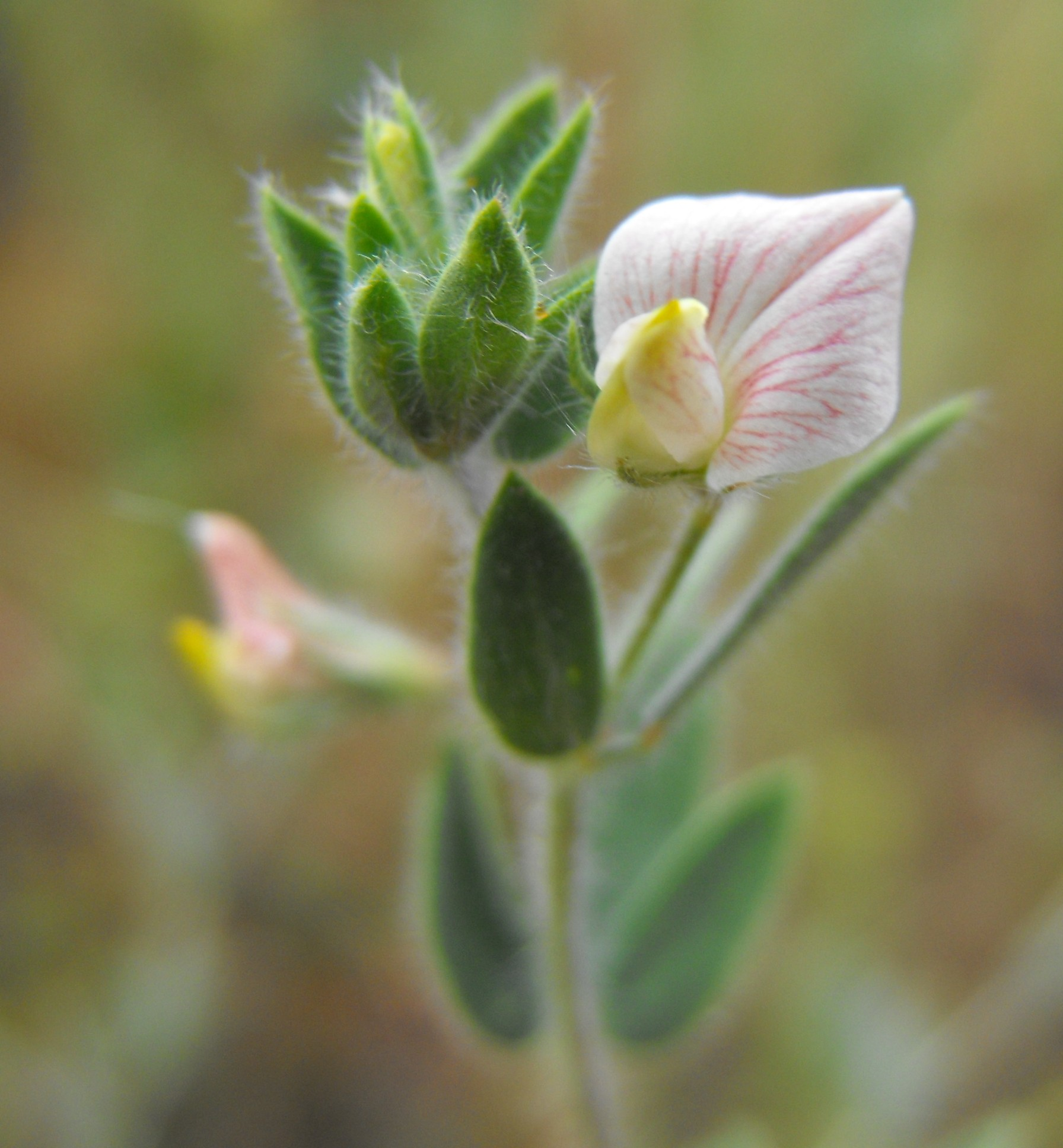

Scientific classification
- Kingdom: Plantae
- Clade: Tracheophytes
- Clade: Angiosperms
- Clade: Eudicots
- Clade: Rosids
- Order: Fabales
- Family: Fabaceae
- Subfamily: Faboideae
- Genus: Acmispon
- Species: A. americanus

Binomial name
- Acmispon americanus (Nutt.) Rydb.

Synonyms
- Lotus purshianus Clem. & E.G. Clem.; Lotus unifoliolatus (Hook.) Benth.

= Acmispon americanus =

Species of legume

Acmispon americanus, known by the common names American bird's-foot trefoil and Spanish clover, is a species of legume native to most habitats of California, the Western United States, Western Canada, and northern Mexico.

== Description ==
The plant is an upright hairy annual, growing to 25 cm. The flowers (to 6mm) are pale pink to cream.

Subspecies

Acmispon americanus is often discussed as comprising several varieties, including:

- Acmispon americanus var. americanus
