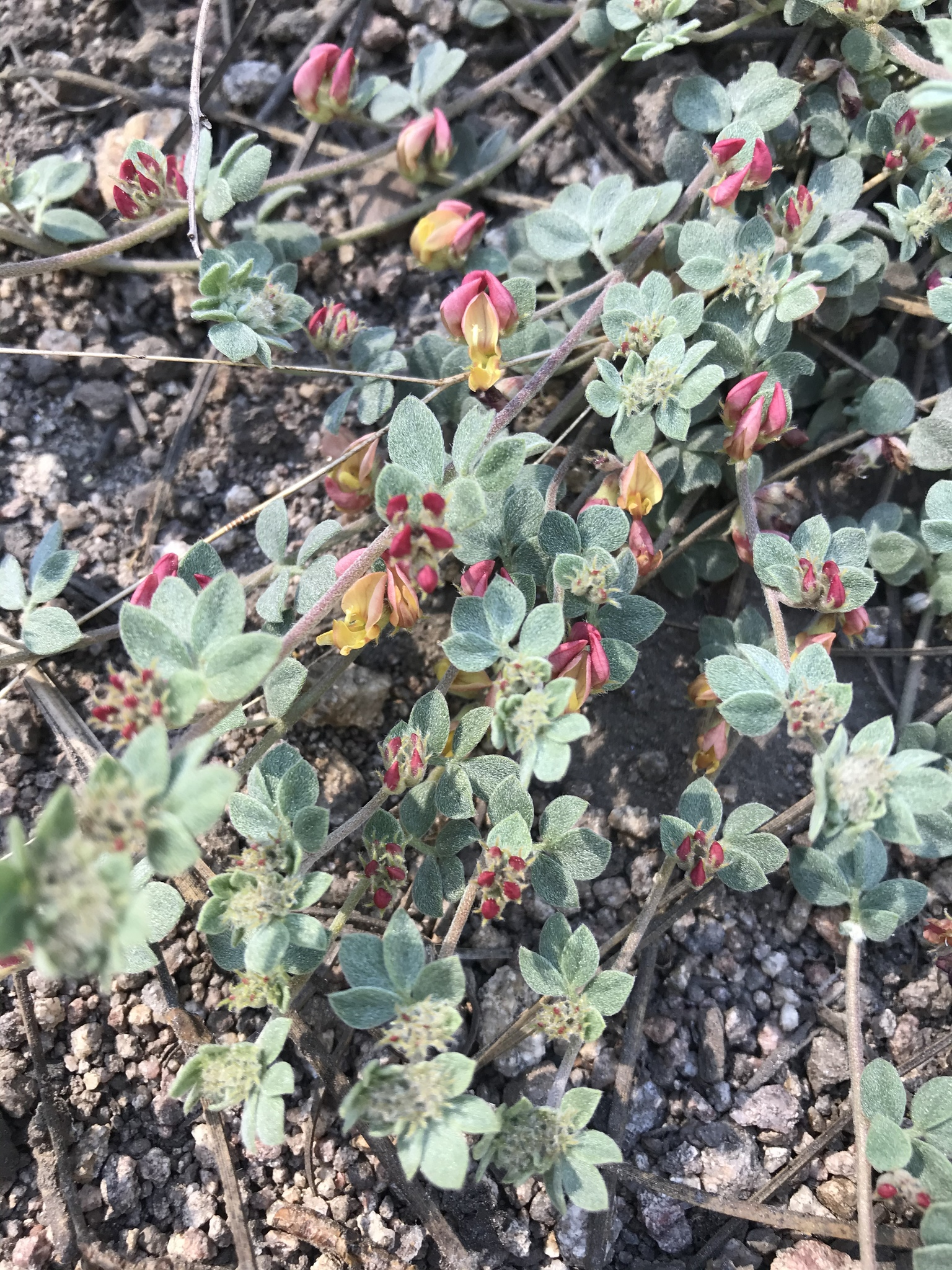
- Acmispon decumbens var. davidsonii

Scientific classification
- Kingdom: Plantae
- Clade: Tracheophytes
- Clade: Angiosperms
- Clade: Eudicots
- Clade: Rosids
- Order: Fabales
- Family: Fabaceae
- Subfamily: Faboideae
- Genus: Acmispon
- Species: A. decumbens

Binomial name
- Acmispon decumbens (Benth.) Govaerts

Synonyms
- Anisolotus decumbens (Benth.) Thornber; Hosackia decumbens Benth.; Lotus douglasii Greene; Lotus nevadensis var. douglasii (Greene) Ottley; Syrmatium decumbens (Benth.) Greene

= Acmispon decumbens =

Species of legume

Acmispon decumbens is a species of flowering plant in the family Fabaceae, native to the western United States (Nevada, California) and north-western Mexico (Baja California). It was first described by George Bentham in 1836 as Hosackia decumbens.

It grows in several types of habitat, including mountain forest and meadows. It is a spreading or mat-forming perennial herb coated in long hairs. It is lined with leaves each made up of small green oval leaflets. The inflorescence bears up 12 pinkish yellow pealike flowers each a centimeter long or more. The fruit is a slender, bent, beaked legume pod.

== Varieties ==
Two varieties are recognized:

- Acmispon decumbens var. decumbens; synonyms include Acmispon nevadensis (S.Watson) Brouillet, Hosackia heermannii L.C.Anderson, Syrmatium nevadense (S.Watson) Greene
- Acmispon decumbens var. davidsonii (Greene) Govaerts; synonyms include Lotus davidsonii Greene
