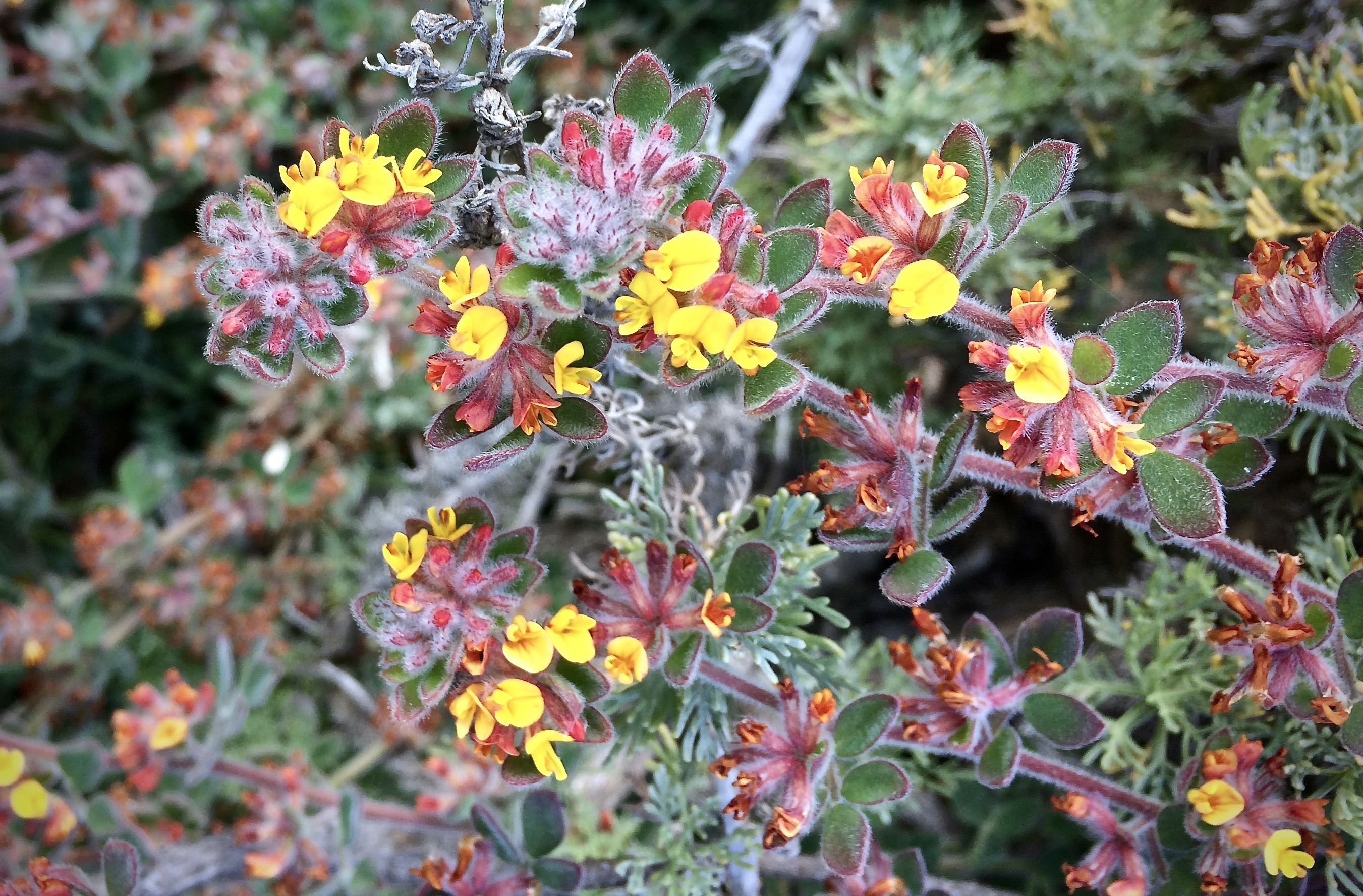
- Acmispon tomentosus var. glabriusculus

Scientific classification
- Kingdom: Plantae
- Clade: Tracheophytes
- Clade: Angiosperms
- Clade: Eudicots
- Clade: Rosids
- Order: Fabales
- Family: Fabaceae
- Subfamily: Faboideae
- Genus: Acmispon
- Species: A. tomentosus

Binomial name
- Acmispon tomentosus (Hook. & Arn.) Govaerts

Varieties
- See text

Synonyms
- 17 synonyms: for Acmispon tomentosus; Hosackia tomentosa Hook. & Arn.; Lotus eriophorus Greene; Lotus heermannii var. eriophorus (Greene) Ottley; Lotus tomentosus (Hook. & Arn.) Greene; Syrmatium eriophorum (Greene) A.Heller; Syrmatium tomentosum (Hook. & Arn.) Vogel; for A. t. var. tomentosus; Acmispon heermannii var. orbicularis (A.Gray) Brouillet; Drepanolobus lanatus Nutt.; Hosackia heermannii var. orbicularis A.Gray; Lotus eriophorus var. heermannii Ottley; Lotus heermannii Greene; Lotus heermannii var. orbicularis (A.Gray) Isely; for A. t. var. glabriusculus; Hosackia decumbens var. glabriuscula Hook. & Arn.; Hosackia tomentosa subsp. glabriuscula (Hook. & Arn.) Abrams; Acmispon heermannii (Durand & Hilg.) Brouillet; Hosackia heermannii Durand & Hilg.; Syrmatium heermannii (Durand & Hilg.) Greene

= Acmispon tomentosus =

Species of flowering plant

Acmispon tomentosus is a species of perennial plant in the family Fabaceae. It is native to California and northwestern Mexico. The variety A. tomentosus var. glabriusculus has the synonym Acmispon heermannii.

== Description ==
The species is identified by small oval hairy succulent leaves. the flower buds are burgundy red and the flowers are yellow, looking much like a small version of a Lotus pedunculatus flower head.

Sometimes this species occurs as an annual plant if it is growing in certain conditions.

== Taxonomy ==
The species was first described by William Jackson Hooker and George Arnott Walker Arnott in 1832 as Hosackia tomentosa. It was moved to the genus Acmispon in 2018.

=== Varieties ===
As of October 2024, Plants of the World Online accepted two varieties:

- Acmispon tomentosus var. glabriusculus (Hook. & Arn.) Govaerts
- Acmispon tomentosus var. tomentosus

A. tomentosus var. glabriusculus has the synonym Acmispon heermannii, and has been known by the common name Heermann's bird's-foot trefoil. As of October 2024, Plants of the World Online and the Jepson eFlora accept this variety rather than the species A. heermannii.

A. tomentosus var. tomentosus is generally identified by having less red in its buds and more hairy leaves.
