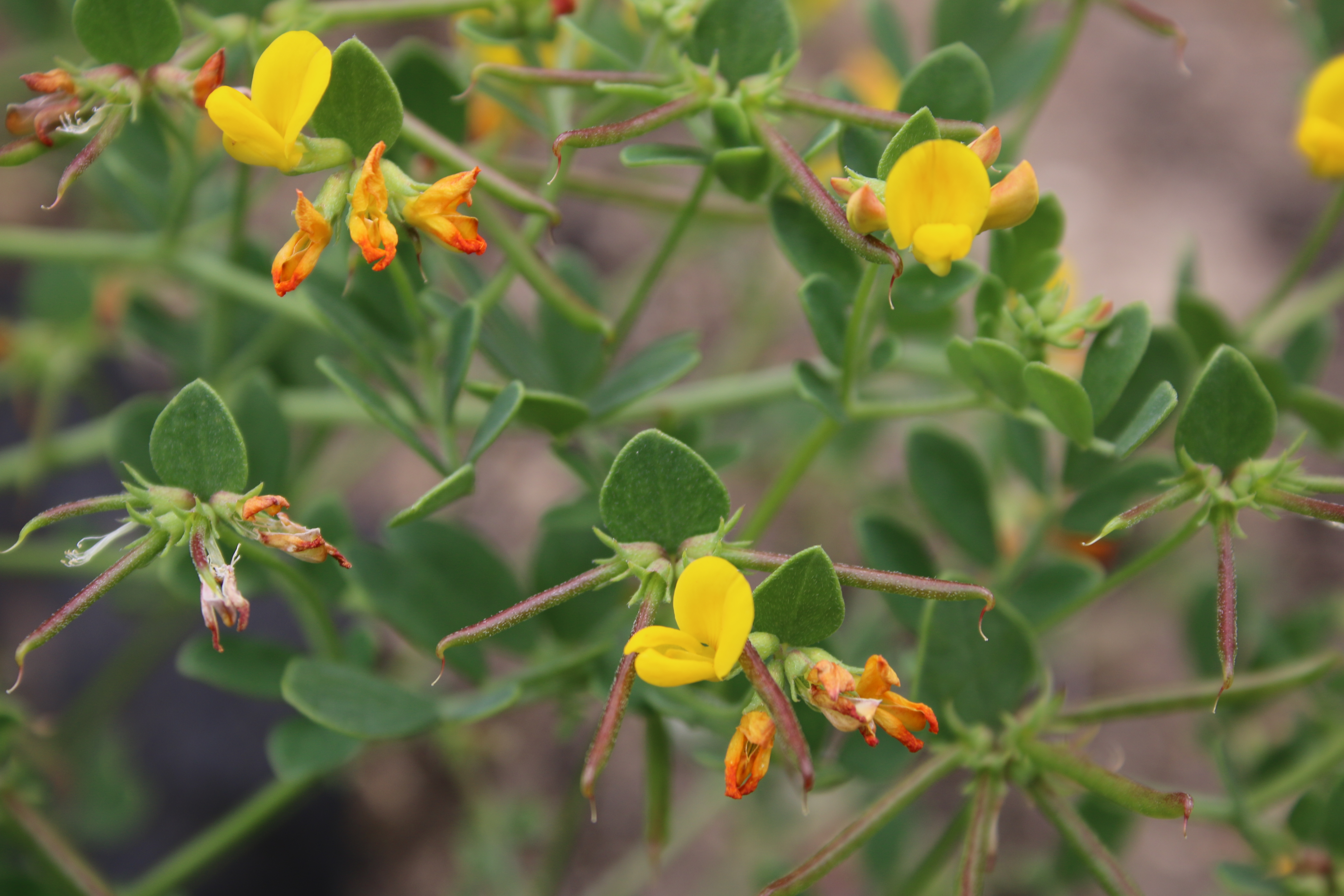

Scientific classification
- Kingdom: Plantae
- Clade: Tracheophytes
- Clade: Angiosperms
- Clade: Eudicots
- Clade: Rosids
- Order: Fabales
- Family: Fabaceae
- Subfamily: Faboideae
- Genus: Acmispon
- Species: A. maritimus

Binomial name
- Acmispon maritimus (Nutt.) D.D.Sokoloff

Synonyms
- Anisolotus maritimus (Nutt.) A.Heller; Hosackia maritima Nutt.; Lotus salsuginosus Greene

= Acmispon maritimus =

Species of legume

Acmispon maritimus, synonym Lotus salsuginosus, is a species of legume native to Arizona, California and northwestern Mexico. It is known by the common name coastal bird's-foot trefoil. It grows in many types of mountain, desert, and scrub habitat, not necessarily near the coast. It is an annual herb quite variable in morphology, from petite to bushy, hairless to roughly hairy, and prostrate to erect in form. The slender stems are lined with leaves each made up of pairs of leaflets variable in shape and size. The inflorescence is a small array of 1 to 4 yellow flowers, each up to a centimeter long or so. The elongated flower corolla emerges from a tubular calyx of sepals. The fruit is a legume pod up to 3 centimeters long. Laboratory studies have shown this species, which occurs in wildfire-prone habitat such as chaparral, to have an increased rate of seed germination after exposure to heat.
