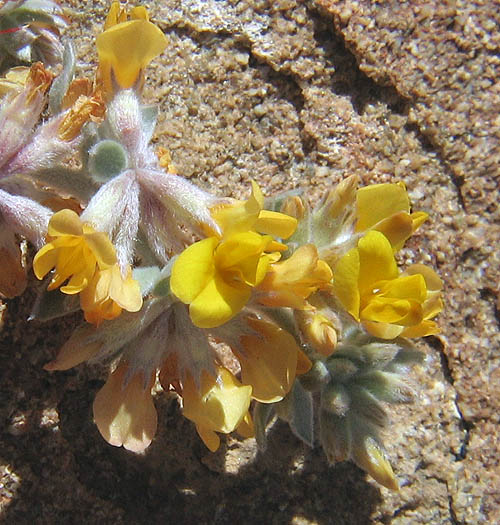

Scientific classification
- Kingdom: Plantae
- Clade: Embryophytes
- Clade: Tracheophytes
- Clade: Angiosperms
- Clade: Eudicots
- Clade: Rosids
- Order: Fabales
- Family: Fabaceae
- Subfamily: Faboideae
- Genus: Acmispon
- Species: A. argophyllus

Binomial name
- Acmispon argophyllus (A.Gray) Brouillet

Synonyms
- Hosackia argophylla A.Gray; Lotus argophyllus (A.Gray) Greene

= Acmispon argophyllus =

Species of legume

Acmispon argophyllus, synonym Lotus argophyllus, is a species of legume native to California and northwest Mexico. It is known by the common name silver bird's-foot trefoil or silver lotus.

It is native to northwest Mexico and California, where it can be found in the southern California Coast Ranges, Peninsular Ranges, and Transverse Ranges, the Sierra Nevada, Southern California coastal zones, and the Channel Islands. It is found on sheltered rocky slopes in chaparral, conifer forest, and other habitat types.

== Description ==
Acmispon argophyllus is a perennial herb growing prostrate to erect, the base of its stem woody and tough and upper parts coat in silky silvery hairs. The leaves are each made up of pairs of hairy oval leaflike leaflets around a centimeter long.

The inflorescence is a cluster of many tubular yellow flowers each about a centimeter long, encased at the base in a calyx of silky-hairy sepals. The fruit is legume pod generally containing a single seed.

General research has indicated that the northern and southern island populations are distinct, with very little mixing, or gene flow, occurring between populations. Such research has also suggested that Acmispon argophyllus is pollinated by generalist bees, however scientists are unsure exactly how its seeds are spread.

=== Varieties ===
The varieties of this species include:

- A. a. var. adsurgens — San Clemente Island bird's-foot trefoil is endemic to San Clemente Island, one of the Channel Islands of California. It is rare.
- A. a. var. argenteus — Channel Islands silver lotus is endemic to several of the Channel Islands.
- A. a. var. argophyllus — Fremont's silver lotus is a more common variety which can be found in mainland distribution.
- A. a. var. fremontii is known only from the Sierra Nevada.
- A. a. var. niveus — Santa Cruz Island bird's-foot trefoil, endemic to Santa Cruz Island, another of the Channel Islands, is rare.
- A. a. var. ornithopus — Guadalupe bird's-foot trefoil, endemic to Guadalupe Island in Baja California, and is sometimes lumped into var. argenteus.

== See also ==
- California chaparral and woodlands
