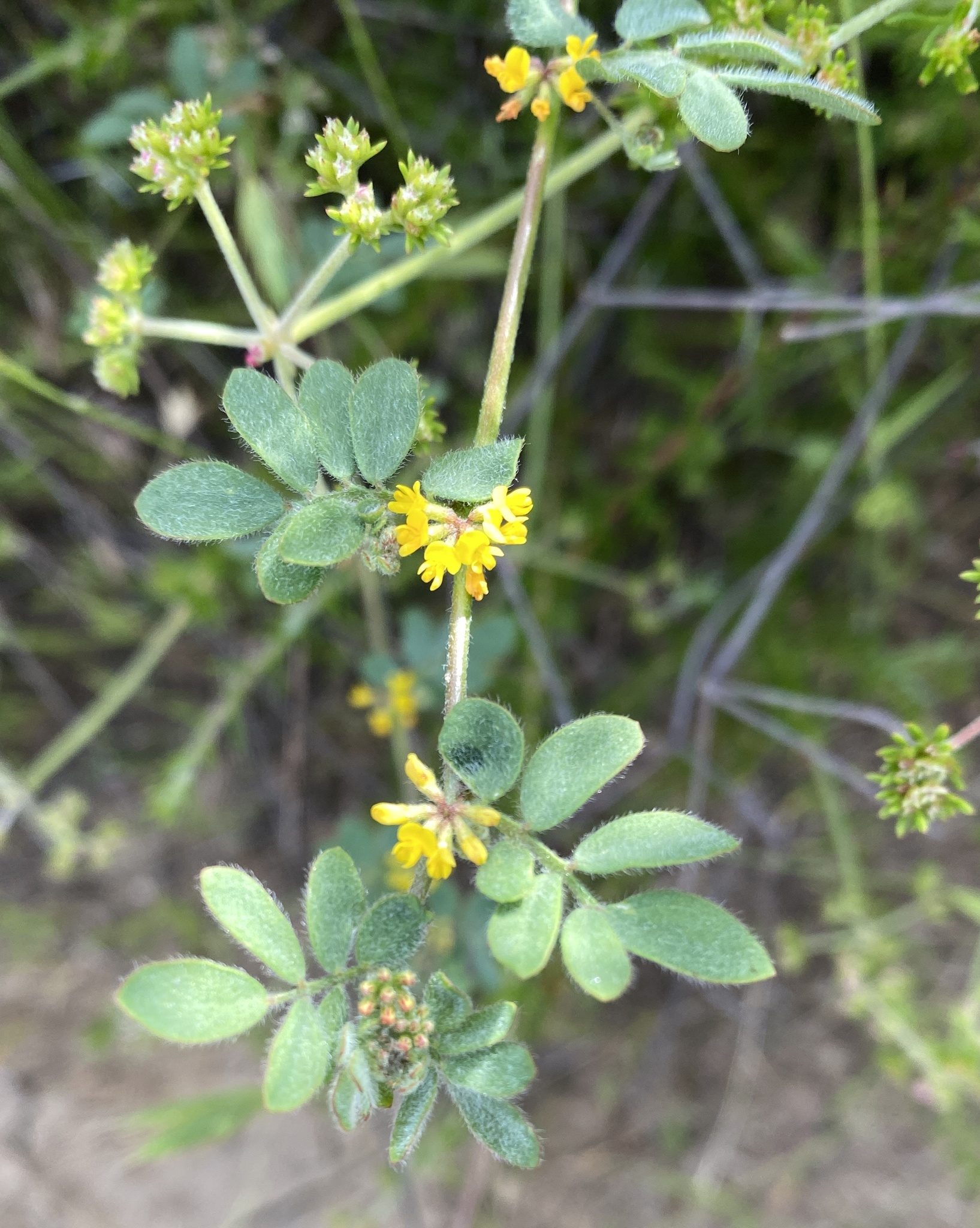

Scientific classification
- Kingdom: Plantae
- Clade: Tracheophytes
- Clade: Angiosperms
- Clade: Eudicots
- Clade: Rosids
- Order: Fabales
- Family: Fabaceae
- Subfamily: Faboideae
- Genus: Acmispon
- Species: A. micranthus

Binomial name
- Acmispon micranthus (Nutt. ex Torr. & A.Gray) Brouillet

Synonyms
- Hosackia micrantha Nutt. ex Torr. & A.Gray; Lotus hamatus Greene; Syrmatium micranthum (Nutt. ex Torr. & A.Gray) Greene

= Acmispon micranthus =

Species of legume

Acmispon micranthus is a species of legume native to California and northwestern Mexico. It is known by the common name San Diego bird's-foot trefoil. It is found in the coastal mountain ranges of California and Baja California, where it grows in various types of scrub and canyon habitat. It is an annual herb taking a spreading or upright form. It is lined with leaves each made up of oval leaflets each about a centimeter long. The inflorescence is a small bunch of red and yellow flowers. Each flower is in a tubular calyx of sepals and is only a few millimeters long. The fruit is a narrow, bent legume pod up to 1.5 centimeters long, including the hooked beak at the tip.
