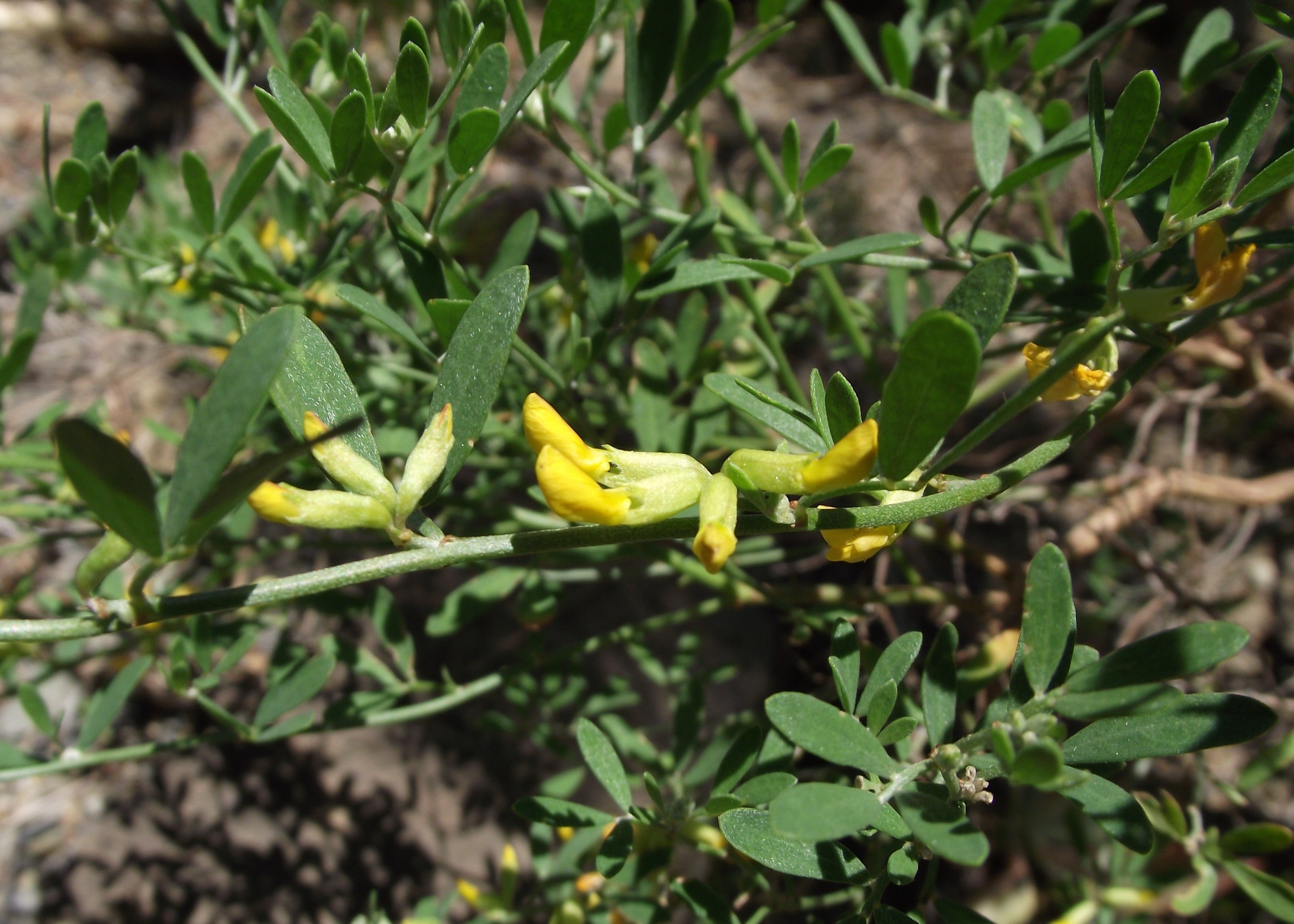

Conservation status
- Apparently Secure (NatureServe)

Scientific classification
- Kingdom: Plantae
- Clade: Tracheophytes
- Clade: Angiosperms
- Clade: Eudicots
- Clade: Rosids
- Order: Fabales
- Family: Fabaceae
- Subfamily: Faboideae
- Genus: Acmispon
- Species: A. dendroideus

Binomial name
- Acmispon dendroideus (Greene) Brouillet

Synonyms
- Species: Hosackia dendroidea (Greene) Abrams; Syrmatium dendroideum Greene; Varieties: See text.

= Acmispon dendroideus =

Species of legume

Acmispon dendroideus, synonym Syrmatium veatchii, is a species of legume native to California. It is known by the common name island broom. It is endemic to the Channel Islands of California, where it grows on coastal bluffs and cliffs. It is a spreading perennial herb or erect shrub approaching 2 meters in height. It is hairless to hairy and gray-green in color. The branches lined with leaves each made up of a few oval leaflike leaflets up to 1.5 centimeters long each. The inflorescence bears up to 10 yellow pealike flowers, each roughly a centimeter long and fading red as they age.

== Taxonomy ==
The species was first described by Edward Lee Greene in 1886, as Syrmatium dendroideum.

=== Varieties ===
A number of varieties have been recognized:

- Acmispon dendroideus var. dendroideus
- Acmispon dendroideus var. traskiae (Eastw. ex Abrams) Brouillet

Synonyms:
- Lotus dendroideus var. traskiae (Eastw. ex Abrams) Isely
- Lotus scoparius subsp. traskiae (Eastw. ex Abrams) P.H.Raven
- Lotus scoparius var. traskiae (Eastw. ex Abrams) Ottley
- Syrmatium traskiae Eastw. ex Abrams

- Acmispon dendroideus var. veatchii (Greene) Brouillet

Synonyms:
- Hosackia veatchii Greene
- Lotus dendroideus Greene
- Lotus dendroideus var. veatchii (Greene) Isely
- Lotus scoparius var. dendroideus Ottley
- Lotus scoparius var. veatchii Ottley
- Lotus veatchii (Greene) Greene
- Syrmatium veatchii (Greene) Greene

The rarest, var. traskiae, the San Clemente Island broom or San Clemente Island lotus, is limited to San Clemente Island. It is treated federally as an endangered species. In the 1990s the Navy removed goats from San Clemente Island and started a management program to benefit this species. Due to the management efforts for this species, it has increased from just 9 occurrences at the time of listing to over 150 populations consisting of over 10,000 individuals. In 2007 the US Fish & Wildlife Service recommended it be downlisted from endangered to threatened status.
