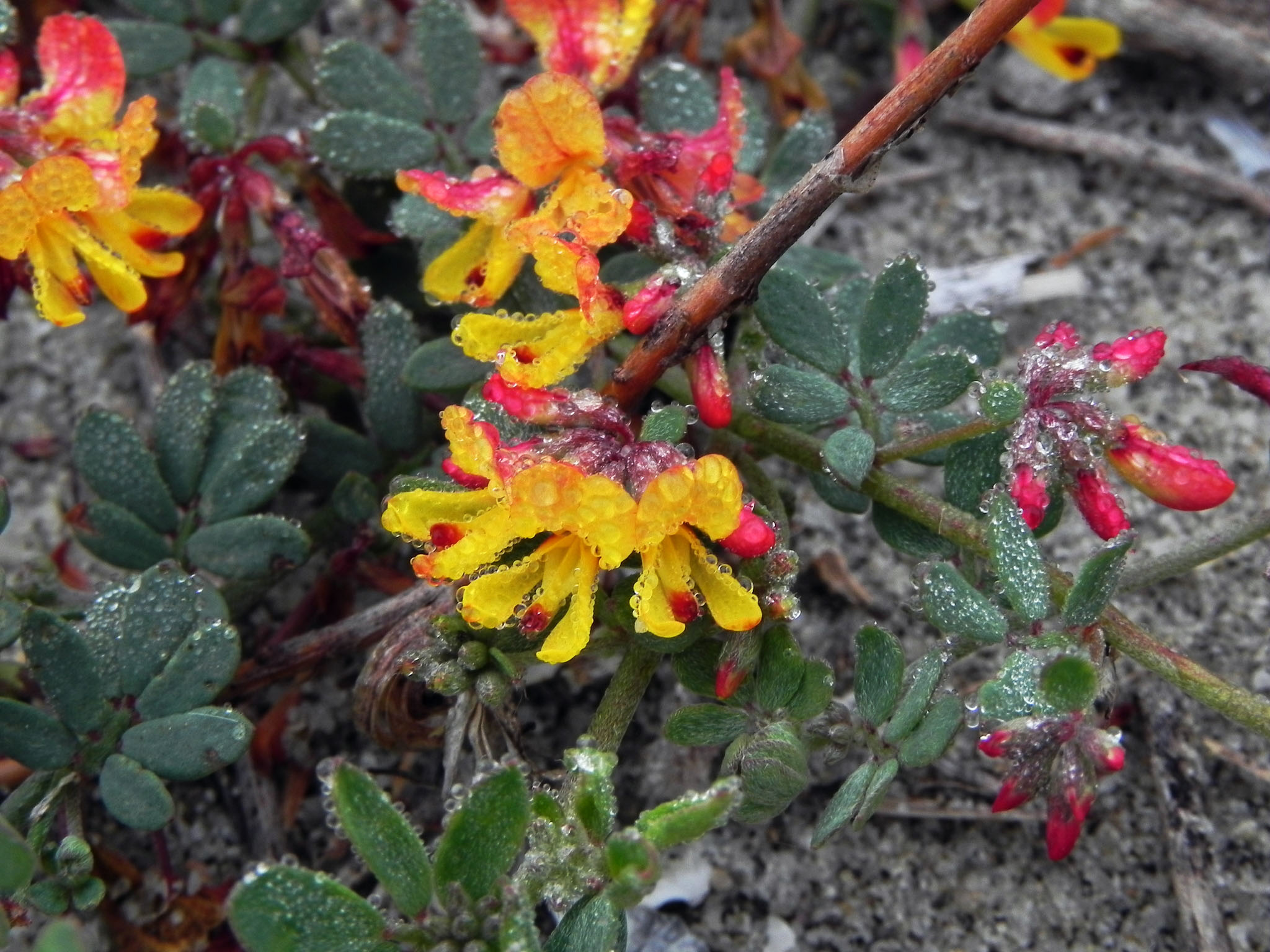

Conservation status
- Critically Imperiled (NatureServe)

Scientific classification
- Kingdom: Plantae
- Clade: Embryophytes
- Clade: Tracheophytes
- Clade: Angiosperms
- Clade: Eudicots
- Clade: Rosids
- Order: Fabales
- Family: Fabaceae
- Subfamily: Faboideae
- Genus: Acmispon
- Species: A. prostratus

Binomial name
- Acmispon prostratus (Nutt.) Brouillet

Synonyms
- Hosackia palmeri Vasey & Rose; Hosackia prostrata Nutt.; Lotus nuttallianus Greene; Lotus prostratus L.; Syrmatium prostratum (Torr. & A.Gray) Brouillet

= Acmispon prostratus =

Species of legume

Acmispon prostratus, synonyms Lotus nuttallianus and Syrmatium prostratum, is a species of legume native to California and northwestern Mexico. It is known by the common names beach lotus, Nuttall's lotus, and wire bird's-foot trefoil. It is native to Baja California and just into San Diego County, California, where it is a resident of coastal habitats, such as beaches and bluffs.

It is a rare plant of the highly developed coastline in and around the city of San Diego, where threatened populations are known at Mission Bay, the Silver Strand and Imperial Beach.

This is an annual herb lined with leaves made up of oval leaflets one half to one centimeter long. The inflorescence bears 3 to 8 red and yellow flowers each about a centimeter in length. The fruit is a slender, curved legume pod containing usually 2 small beanlike seeds.
