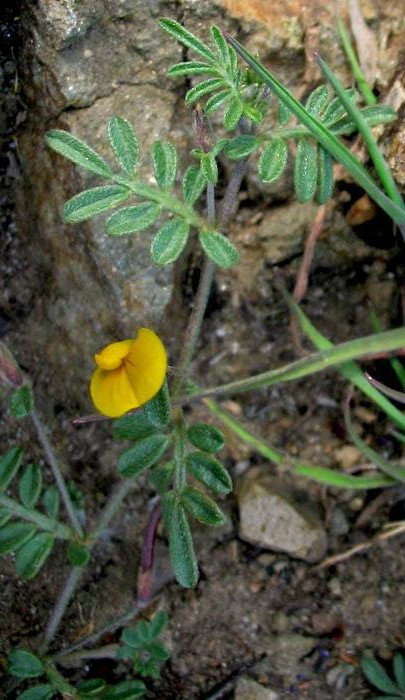

Scientific classification
- Kingdom: Plantae
- Clade: Tracheophytes
- Clade: Angiosperms
- Clade: Eudicots
- Clade: Rosids
- Order: Fabales
- Family: Fabaceae
- Subfamily: Faboideae
- Genus: Acmispon
- Species: A. strigosus

Binomial name
- Acmispon strigosus (Nutt.) Brouillet (2008)

Synonyms
- Acmispon strigosus var. hirtellus (Greene) D.W.Taylor (2010); Anisolotus hirtellus (Greene) A.Heller (1912); Anisolotus nudiflorus (Nutt.) A.Heller (1911 publ. 1912); Anisolotus rubellus (Nutt.) A.Heller (1911 publ. 1912); Anisolotus strigosus (Nutt.) A.Heller (1907); Hosackia hirtella (Greene) Brand (1898); Hosackia maritima Torr. (1859), nom. illeg.; Hosackia nudiflora Nutt. (1838); Hosackia rubella Nutt. (1838); Hosackia strigosa Nutt. (1838); Hosackia strigosa var. hirtella H.M.Hall (1912); Lotus hirtellus Greene (1890); Lotus nudiflorus Greene (1890); Lotus rubellus Greene (1890); Lotus strigosus Greene (1890); Lotus strigosus var. hirtellus Ottley (1923); Lotus strigosus var. nudiflorus (Nutt.) Jeps. (1901); Ottleya strigosa (Nutt.) D.D.Sokoloff (1999)

= Acmispon strigosus =

Species of legume

Acmispon strigosus, synonyms Lotus strigosus and Ottleya strigosa, is a flowering plant in the pea family (Fabaceae), native to the southwestern United States and northern Mexico. It is known as stiff-haired lotus or strigose bird's-foot trefoil.

== Description ==
Acmispon strigosus is a prostrate annual herb. It is sometimes roughly hairy as its name suggests, but it may be somewhat woolly, fuzzy, or nearly hairless as well. Its slender branches are lined with leaves each made of several small leaflets. The leaves are 1/2" to 1" long. They are pinnately divided, with 4-9 obovate, alternate, leaflets, on a flattened rachis. The inflorescence bears one or two yellow to orange or red pealike flowers, each with a corolla one half to one centimeter across. The fruit is a legume pod 1 to 3 centimeters long.

== Distribution and habitat ==
It is native to the southwestern United States (California and Nevada) and northern Mexico, where it is known from many types of habitat, including disturbed areas.
