= Acmispon distichus =

Scientific classification
- Kingdom: Plantae
- Clade: Tracheophytes
- Clade: Angiosperms
- Clade: Eudicots
- Clade: Rosids
- Order: Fabales
- Family: Fabaceae
- Subfamily: Faboideae
- Genus: Acmispon
- Species: A. distichus

Binomial name
- Acmispon distichus (Greene) Brouillet

Species of plant

Acmispon distichus is a species of Acmispon endemic to northwestern Mexico.

== Description ==
This species is identified by small hairy leaves, deep red flowers, and small short seed heads with a little end beak.

== Conservation status ==
This species is considered Least Concern by Kew.
