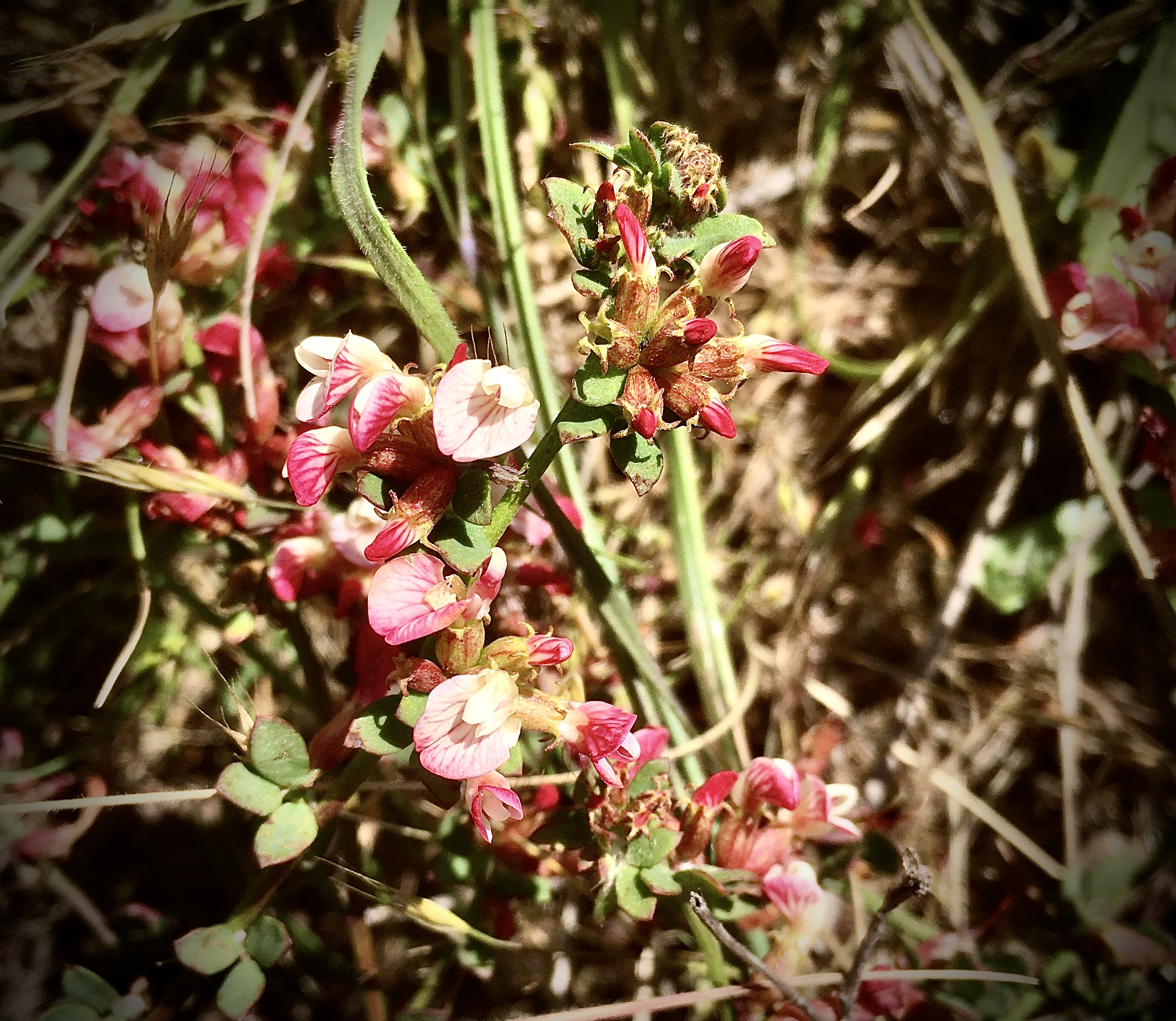

Conservation status
- Apparently Secure (NatureServe)

Scientific classification
- Kingdom: Plantae
- Clade: Tracheophytes
- Clade: Angiosperms
- Clade: Eudicots
- Clade: Rosids
- Order: Fabales
- Family: Fabaceae
- Subfamily: Faboideae
- Genus: Acmispon
- Species: A. cytisoides

Binomial name
- Acmispon cytisoides Greene

Synonyms
- Hosackia cytisoides Benth.; Lotus benthamii Greene; Syrmatium cytisoides (Benth.) Brouillet

= Acmispon cytisoides =

Species of legume

Acmispon cytisoides, synonyms Lotus benthamii and Syrmatium cytisoides, is a species of legume native to California. It is known by the common names Bentham's broom and Bentham's deerweed. It is endemic to central California, where it occurs along the Central Coast and into the coastal mountain ranges. It grows in oceanside habitat and inland on slopes and in canyons. It is a mat-forming or spreading perennial herb lined with leaves each made up of a few oval leaflike leaflets up to 12 mm long. The inflorescence bears up to 10 dull pinkish dark-veined flowers, each just under 1 cm long.
