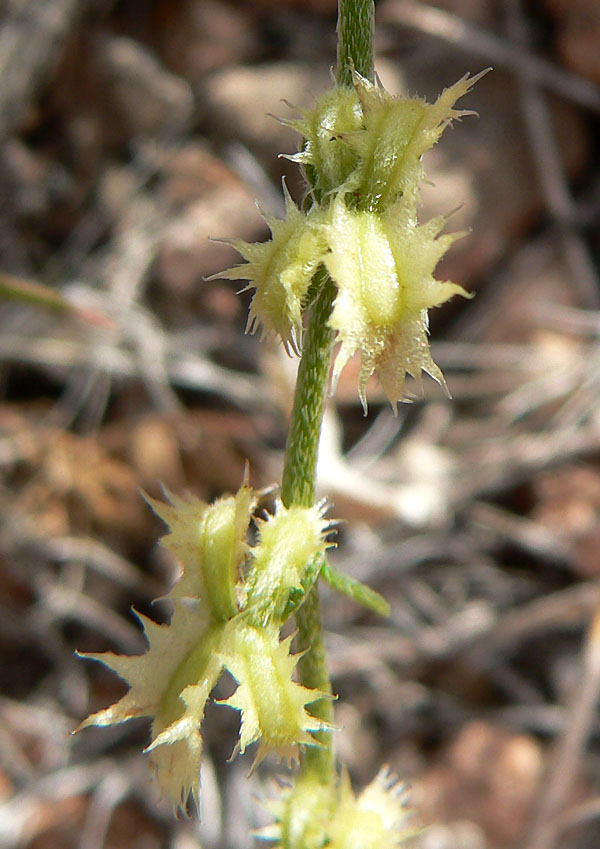
- Fruits

Scientific classification
- Kingdom: Plantae
- Clade: Tracheophytes
- Clade: Angiosperms
- Clade: Eudicots
- Clade: Asterids
- Order: Boraginales
- Family: Boraginaceae
- Genus: Pectocarya
- Species: P. platycarpa

Binomial name
- Pectocarya platycarpa Munz & I.M.Johnst.

= Pectocarya platycarpa =

Species of flowering plant

Pectocarya platycarpa is a species of flowering plant in the borage family known by the common names broadfruit combseed and wide-toothed pectocarya. It is native to the southwestern United States and northwestern Mexico, where it grows in many types of coastal and inland habitat, from mountains to desert. This is an annual herb producing a slender, rough-haired stem, generally upright to erect in form to a maximum height of 25 centimeters. The small, pointed linear leaves are alternately arranged, widely spaced along the stem. The inflorescence is a series of flowers, each on a curved pedicel. The flower has small green sepals and a tiny white corolla. The fruit is an array of four flattened, slightly curving nutlets lined with thin teeth.
