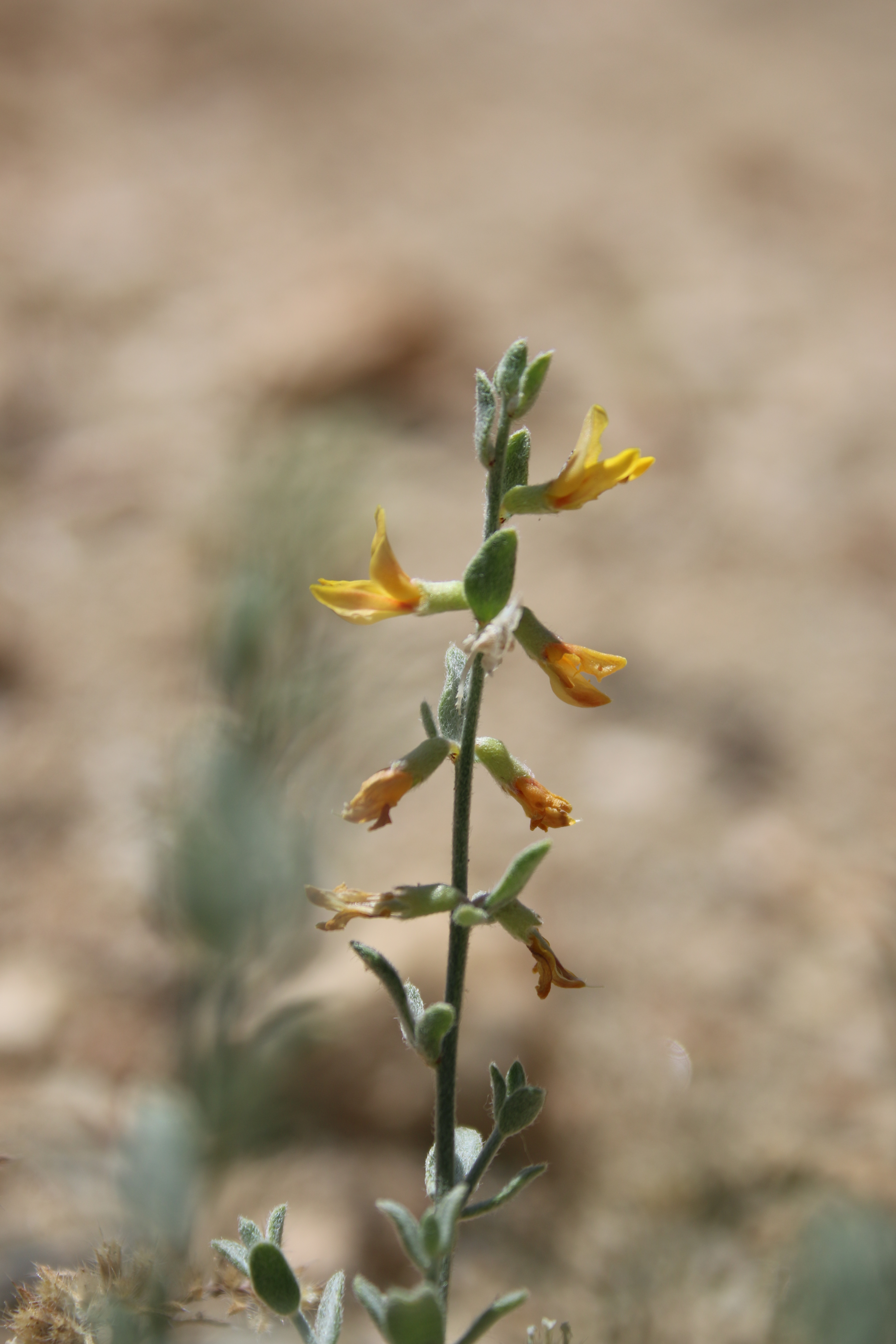
- var. jepsonii

Scientific classification
- Kingdom: Plantae
- Clade: Tracheophytes
- Clade: Angiosperms
- Clade: Eudicots
- Clade: Rosids
- Order: Fabales
- Family: Fabaceae
- Subfamily: Faboideae
- Genus: Acmispon
- Species: A. procumbens

Binomial name
- Acmispon procumbens (Greene) Brouillet

Synonyms
- Hosackia procumbens Greene; Hosackia sericea Benth.; Lotus leucophyllus Greene; Lotus procumbens Greene; Syrmatium procumbens (Greene) Greene; Syrmatium sericeum (Benth.) Greene

= Acmispon procumbens =

Species of legume

Acmispon procumbens, synonym Lotus procumbens, is a species of legume endemic to California. It is known by the common name silky deerweed. It is known from many habitat types in several regions from the Central Valley to the Mojave Desert to the Peninsular Ranges.

== Description ==
It is a tough, hairy perennial herb spreading as a clumpy mat or sometimes growing erect to approach a meter in height. Its slender branches are lined with small leaves each made up usually three leaflets. The inflorescence is generally 1 to 3 solid or red-veined yellow flowers between 1 and 2 centimeters long. The fruit is a legume pod just over a centimeter long containing 2 or 3 beanlike seeds.
