= Acmispon junceus =

Conservation status
- Apparently Secure (NatureServe)

Scientific classification
- Kingdom: Plantae
- Clade: Tracheophytes
- Clade: Angiosperms
- Clade: Eudicots
- Clade: Rosids
- Order: Fabales
- Family: Fabaceae
- Subfamily: Faboideae
- Genus: Acmispon
- Species: A. junceus

Binomial name
- Acmispon junceus (Benth.) Brouillet

Synonyms
- Hosackia juncea Benth.; Lotus junceus (Benth.) Greene; Syrmatium junceum (Benth.) Greene

Species of legume

Acmispon junceus, synonyms Lotus junceus and Syrmatium junceum, is a species of legume native to California. It is known by the common names rush broom and rush deervetch. It is endemic to California, where it is known from the northern and central coast and the coastal mountain ranges. It can be found from beaches inland to serpentine slopes and chaparral. It is a hairy, prostrate or spreading perennial herb lined with leaves each made up of small oval leaflets. The inflorescence bears up 8 yellow pealike flowers each up to about a centimeter long. The fruit is a small beaked legume pod.
