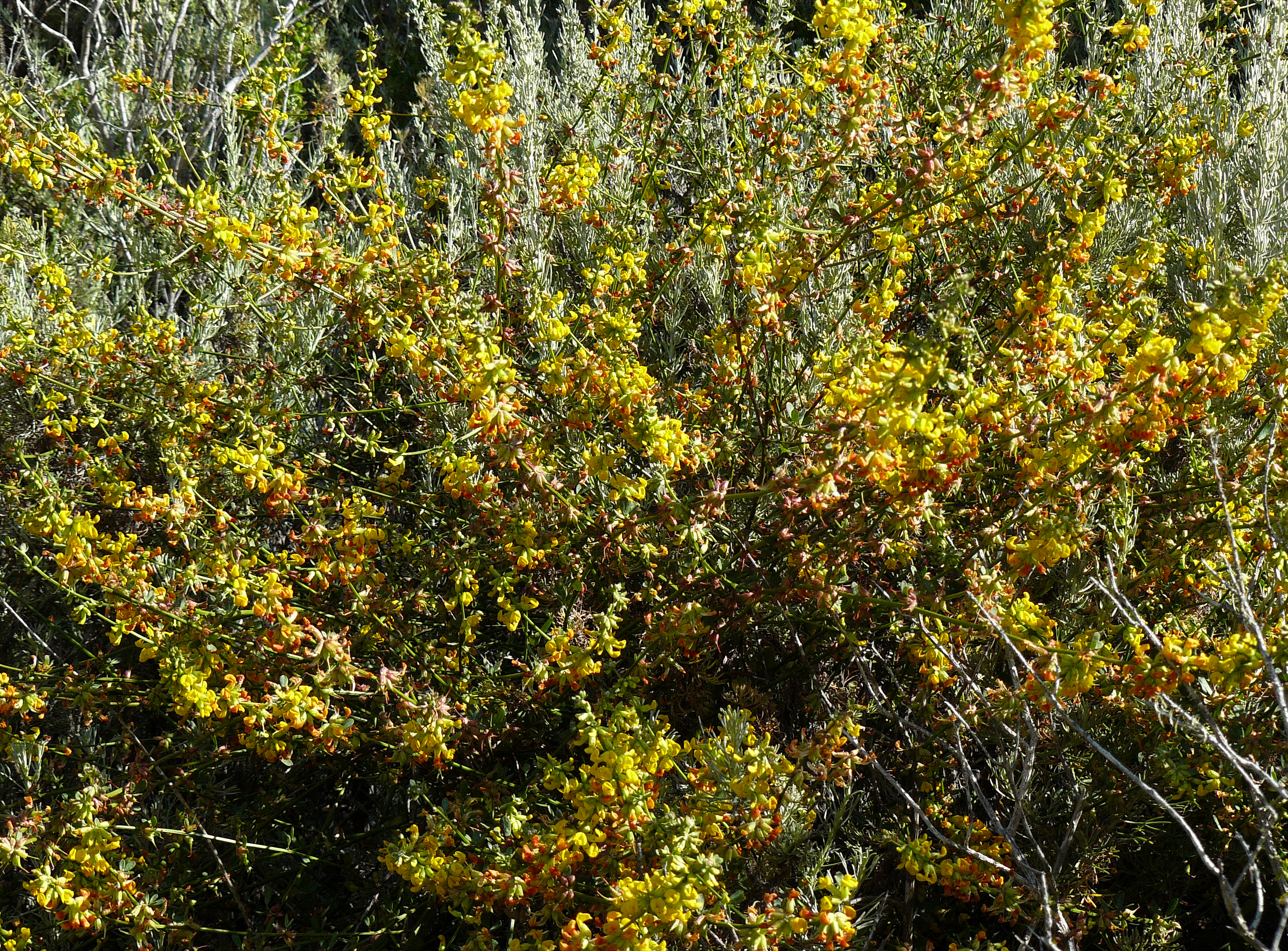
- Acmispon glaber

Scientific classification
- Kingdom: Plantae
- Clade: Embryophytes
- Clade: Tracheophytes
- Clade: Spermatophytes
- Clade: Angiosperms
- Clade: Eudicots
- Clade: Rosids
- Order: Fabales
- Family: Fabaceae
- Subfamily: Faboideae
- Clade: Robinioids
- Tribe: Loteae
- Genus: Acmispon; Raf. (1832)

Species
- 35; see text

Synonyms
- Anisolotus Bernh. (1837); Drepanolobus Nutt. (1838); Ottleya D.D.Sokoloff (1999); Syrmatium Vogel (1836)

= Acmispon =

Genus of legumes

Acmispon is a genus of flowering plant in the family Fabaceae (legumes), native to North America and the west coast of Chile in South America. It includes several species of American bird's-foot trefoils and deervetches formerly contained in the globally distributed genus Lotus. The former genus Syrmatium is included in Acmispon. The Jepson eFlora accepts only Acmispon.

== Species ==
As of September 2023, the following species were accepted:

- Acmispon americanus (Nutt.) Rydb.
- Acmispon argophyllus (A.Gray) Brouillet
- Acmispon argyraeus (Greene) Brouillet
- Acmispon brachycarpus (Benth.) D.D.Sokoloff
- Acmispon cytisoides (Benth.) Brouillet, syn. Syrmatium cytisoides
- Acmispon decumbens (Benth.) Govaerts, including Acmispon nevadensis (S.Watson) Brouillet
- Acmispon dendroideus (Greene) Brouillet, syn. Syrmatium veatchii
- Acmispon denticulatus (Drew) D.D.Sokoloff
- Acmispon distichus (Greene) Brouillet
- Acmispon flexuosus (Greene) Brouillet
- Acmispon glaber (Vogel) Brouillet
- Acmispon grandiflorus (Benth.) Brouillet
- Acmispon haydonii (Orcutt) Brouillet, syn. Syrmatium haydonii
- Acmispon intricatus (Eastw.) Brouillet
- Acmispon junceus (Benth.) Brouillet, syn. Syrmatium junceum
- Acmispon maritimus (Nutt.) D.D.Sokoloff
- Acmispon mearnsii (Britton) Brouillet
- Acmispon micranthus (Nutt. ex Torr. & A.Gray) Brouillet, syn. Syrmatium micranthum
- Acmispon neomexicanus (Greene) Brouillet
- Acmispon niveus (S.Watson) Brouillet
- Acmispon nudatus (Greene) Brouillet
- Acmispon oroboides (Kunth) Brouillet
- Acmispon parviflorus (Benth.) D.D.Sokoloff
- Acmispon plebeius (Brandegee) Allred
- Acmispon procumbens (Greene) Brouillet
- Acmispon prostratus (Torr. & A.Gray) Brouillet, syn. Syrmatium prostratum
- Acmispon rigidus (Benth.) Brouillet, syn. Ottleya rigida (Benth.) D.D.Sokoloff
- Acmispon rubriflorus (H.Sharsm.) D.D.Sokoloff
- Acmispon strigosus (Nutt.) Brouillet, syn. Ottleya strigosa (Nutt.) D.D.Sokoloff
- Acmispon subpinnatus (Lag.) D.D.Sokoloff
- Acmispon tomentosus (Hook. & Arn.) Govaerts
  - Acmispon tomentosus var. glabriusculus (Hook. & Arn.) Govaerts, syn. Acmispon heermannii (Durand & Hilg.) Brouillet
  - Acmispon tomentosus var. tomentosus
- Acmispon utahensis (Ottley) Brouillet
- Acmispon watsonii (Vasey & Rose) Brouillet
- Acmispon wrangelianus (Fisch. & C.A.Mey.) Sokoloff
- Acmispon wrightii (A.Gray) Brouillet
