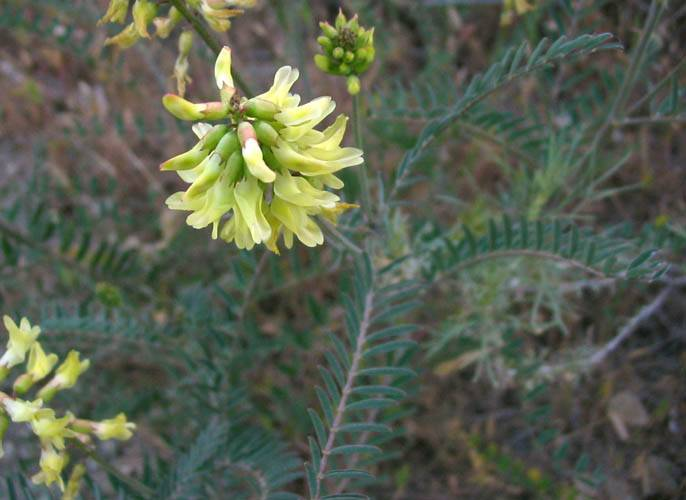

Conservation status
- Vulnerable (NatureServe)

Scientific classification
- Kingdom: Plantae
- Clade: Tracheophytes
- Clade: Angiosperms
- Clade: Eudicots
- Clade: Rosids
- Order: Fabales
- Family: Fabaceae
- Subfamily: Faboideae
- Genus: Astragalus
- Species: A. trichopodus

Binomial name
- Astragalus trichopodus (Nutt.) A.Gray

= Astragalus trichopodus =

Species of legume

Astragalus trichopodus is a species of legume known by the common name Santa Barbara milk vetch. It is native to southern California and Baja California, where it grows in several types of open habitat, including in the Transverse Ranges and Mojave Desert.

The species has three subspecies:

Astraglus trichopodus var. antiselli - Antisell's milkvetch

Astraglus trichopodus var. lonchus - Southern California milkvetch

Astraglus trichopodus var. trichopodus - Santa Barbara milkvetch

== Description ==
This is a robust perennial herb producing a branching stem up to about a meter in maximum height. The hairy stem is lined with many leaves each up to 20 cm (7.9 in) long which are made up of several pairs of widely spaced lance-shaped leaflets each up to 2.5 cm (0.98 in) in length. The inflorescence is a raceme of up to 50 flowers which are cream colored and sometimes tinted with light purple. Each flower is 2 to 3 cm (0.79 to 1.18 in) long including its tubular base of sepals. The species' blooming period is from February to June.

The fruit is a laterally compressed, slightly inflated legume pod up to 4 to 5 cm (1.6 to 2.0 in) long which dries to a papery texture. The fruits hang in bunches where they develop from the inflorescence. Each pod contains many seeds.

== Distribution and habitat ==
The plant is endemic and native to southern California and its range also extends to Baja California. It can be found in coastal sage scrub and grassland communities.

It is most commonly found in the months of March, April, and May.

Its conservation status is listed as G3, which means it is vulnerable.

== Ecology ==
Astragalus trichopodus supports several different species of butterflies and is the host plant for the Reakirt's blue, the arrowhead blue, the marine blue, Queen Alexandra's sulphur, and the critically endangered Palos Verdes blue butterfly.

The species was once thought to be the only host plant for Palos Verdes blue butterflies, but larvae have since been found to feed on Acmispon glaber as well.
