= White point (disambiguation) =

White point is a term in image science.

White Point may also refer to:

- White Point (Jackson County, Oregon)
- White Point Garden
- White Point Nature Preserve
- Mythimna albipuncta, a moth with the common name of "white-point".
