= Glaucopsyche argali =

Scientific classification
- Domain: Eukaryota
- Kingdom: Animalia
- Phylum: Arthropoda
- Class: Insecta
- Order: Lepidoptera
- Family: Lycaenidae
- Genus: Glaucopsyche
- Species: G. argali

Binomial name
- Glaucopsyche argali (Elwes, 1899)

Species of butterfly

Glaucopsyche argali is a butterfly found in the East Palearctic (Altai) that belongs to the blues family.

== Subspecies ==
- G. a. argali Southeast Altai
- G. a. arkhar Lukhtanov, 1990 Saur, Manrak, Kurchum Mountains
- G. a. chingiz Churkin, 2005 Mongolia

== Description from Seitz ==
L. argali Elw. This species is said to be allied to melanops, but to have the upperside pale silver grey. — Elwes discovered this insect in the Altai.

== Biology ==
The larva feeds on Larva on Oxytropis spp.

== See also ==
- List of butterflies of Russia
