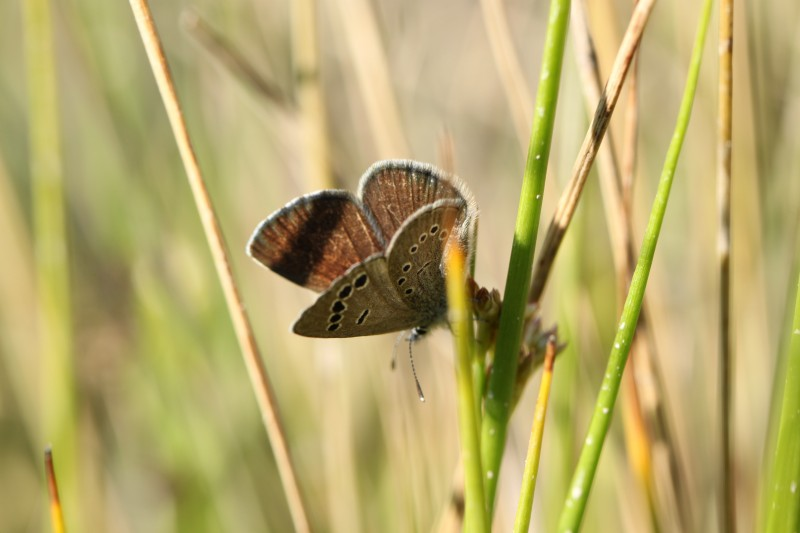

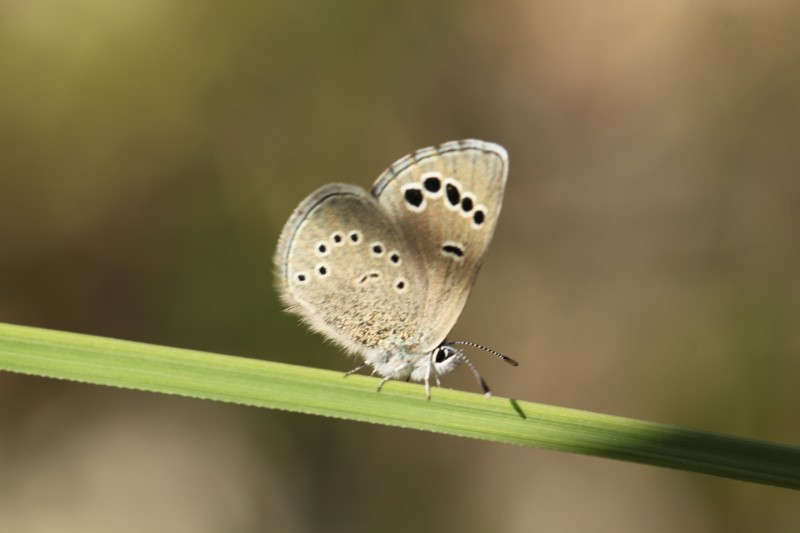
- Imagos of G. paphos at Paphos, Cyprus

Scientific classification
- Kingdom: Animalia
- Phylum: Arthropoda
- Clade: Pancrustacea
- Class: Insecta
- Order: Lepidoptera
- Family: Lycaenidae
- Genus: Glaucopsyche
- Species: G. paphos

Binomial name
- Glaucopsyche paphos Chapman, 1920

= Glaucopsyche paphos =

Paphos blue

Species of butterfly

Glaucopsyche paphos is a small butterfly found in the Palearctic that belongs to the blues family. It is endemic to Cyprus It is sometimes considered to be a subspecies of Glaucopsyche melanops.

== See also ==
- List of butterflies of Europe
