= Glaucopsyche lygdamus =

- Male
- Both Glaucopsyche lygdamus couperi

Conservation status
- Secure (NatureServe)

Scientific classification
- Kingdom: Animalia
- Phylum: Arthropoda
- Clade: Pancrustacea
- Class: Insecta
- Order: Lepidoptera
- Family: Lycaenidae
- Genus: Glaucopsyche
- Species: G. lygdamus

Binomial name
- Glaucopsyche lygdamus (Edward Doubleday, 1841)

Subspecies
- See text

Species of butterfly

Glaucopsyche lygdamus, the silvery blue, is a small butterfly native to North America.

== Description ==
Its upperside is a light blue in males and a dull grayish blue in females. The underside is gray with a single row of round spots of differing sizes depending upon the region.

== Distribution and habitat ==
G. lygdamus is found over much of the western United States and most of Canada extending north excepting most of Nunavut and the high Arctic islands. Wingspan is from 18 to 28 mm. It occurs in a variety of habitats including alpine meadows, shale barrens, dunes, and wooded areas. It feeds on Lupinus plants.

== Taxonomy ==
The extinct Xerces blue (Glaucopsyche xerces) was once thought to be a subspecies of the silvery blue.

=== Subspecies ===
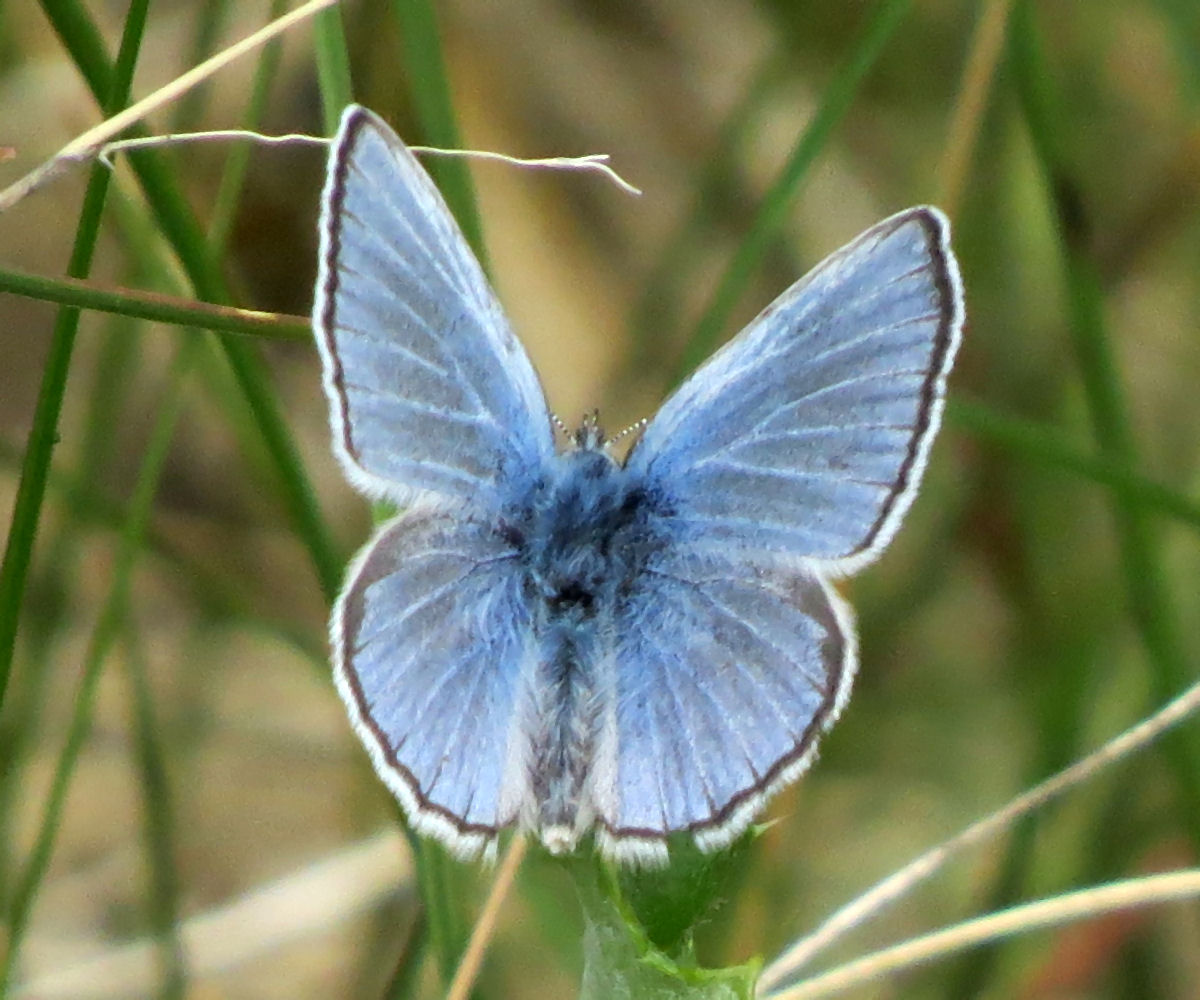
G. l. couperii on tufted vetch (Vicia cracca), Calgary, Alberta, Canada

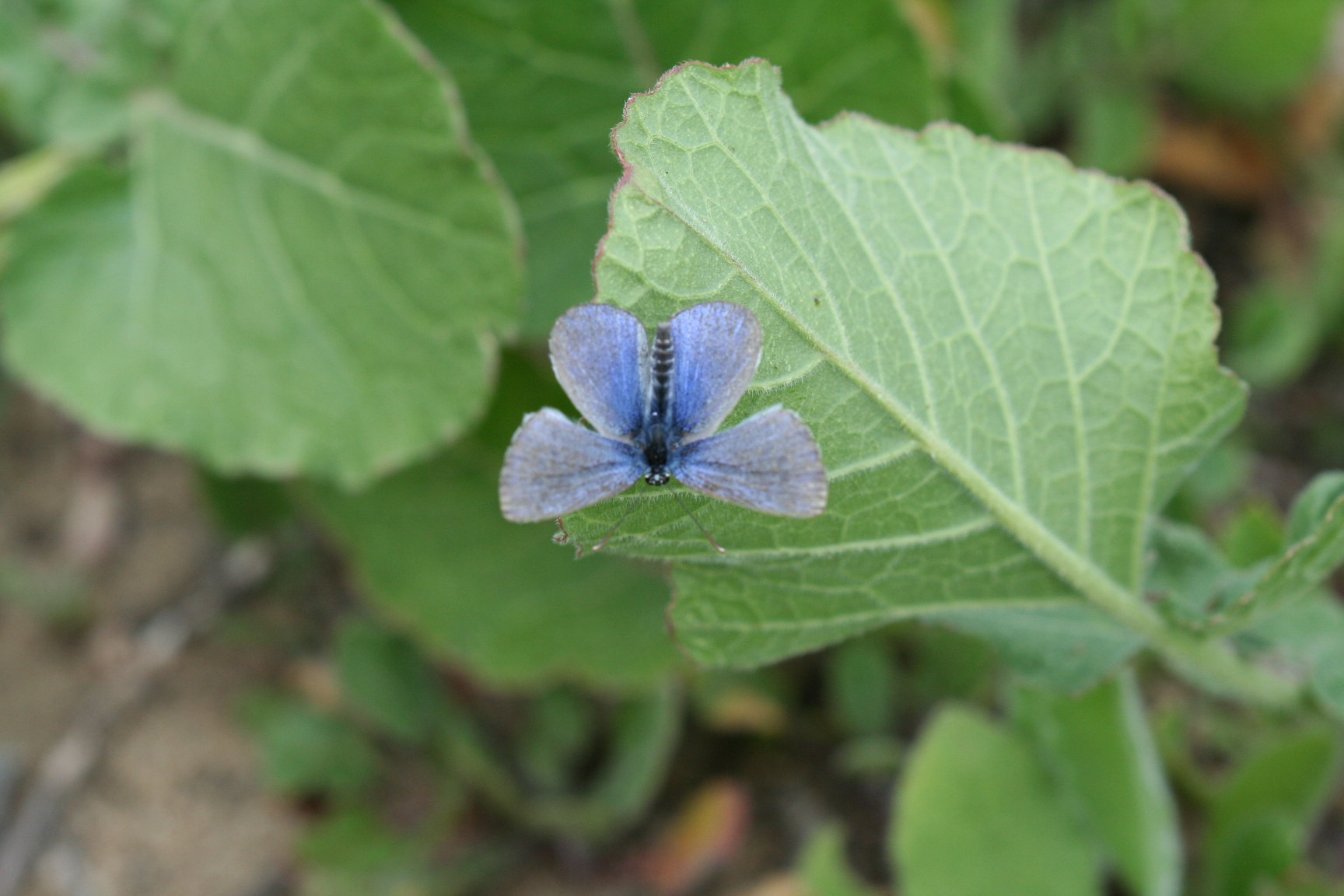
G. l. palosverdesensis

Listed alphabetically:

- G. l. afra (W. H. Edwards, 1884) – Afra (silvery) blue
- G. l. arizonensis McDunnough, 1934 – Arizona silvery blue
- G. l. australis (F. Grinnell, 1917) – southern (silvery) blue
- G. l. columbia (Skinner, 1917) – Columbia blue or Skinner's (silvery) blue
- G. l. couperi Grote, 1873 – Couper's silvery blue
- G. l. deserticola (Austin & J. Emmel, 1998) – Mojave silvery blue
- G. l. incognitus Tilden, 1974 – Behr's silvery blue
- G. l. jacki Stallings & Turner, 1947 – Jack's (silvery) blue
- G. l. lygdamus (Edward Doubleday, 1841) – (Georgian) silvery blue
- G. l. mildredae F. Chermock, 1944 – Mildred's silvery blue
- G. l. minipunctum (Austin, 1998) – mini-spotted silvery blue
- G. l. nittanyensis (F. Chermock, 1944) – Appalachian silvery blue
- G. l. oro Scudder, 1876 – oro (silvery) blue
- G. l. palosverdesensis (E. Perkins & J. Emmel, 1977) – Palos Verdes blue
- G. l. pseudoxerces (Emmel & Emmel, 1998) – false Xerces (silvery) blue
- G. l. sabulosa (Emmel, Emmel & Mattoon, 1998) – sand dune silvery blue

== Visually similar species ==
- Eastern tailed-blue (Cupido comyntas) has small 'tails' on hindwings
- Western tailed-blue (Cupido amyntula) has small 'tails' on hindwings
- Arrowhead blue (Glaucopsyche piasus)
- Greenish blue (Aricia saepiolus) has two rows of small black spots on the underside of both wings
- Boisduval's blue (Aricia icarioides) has two rows of small black spots on the underside of both wings
