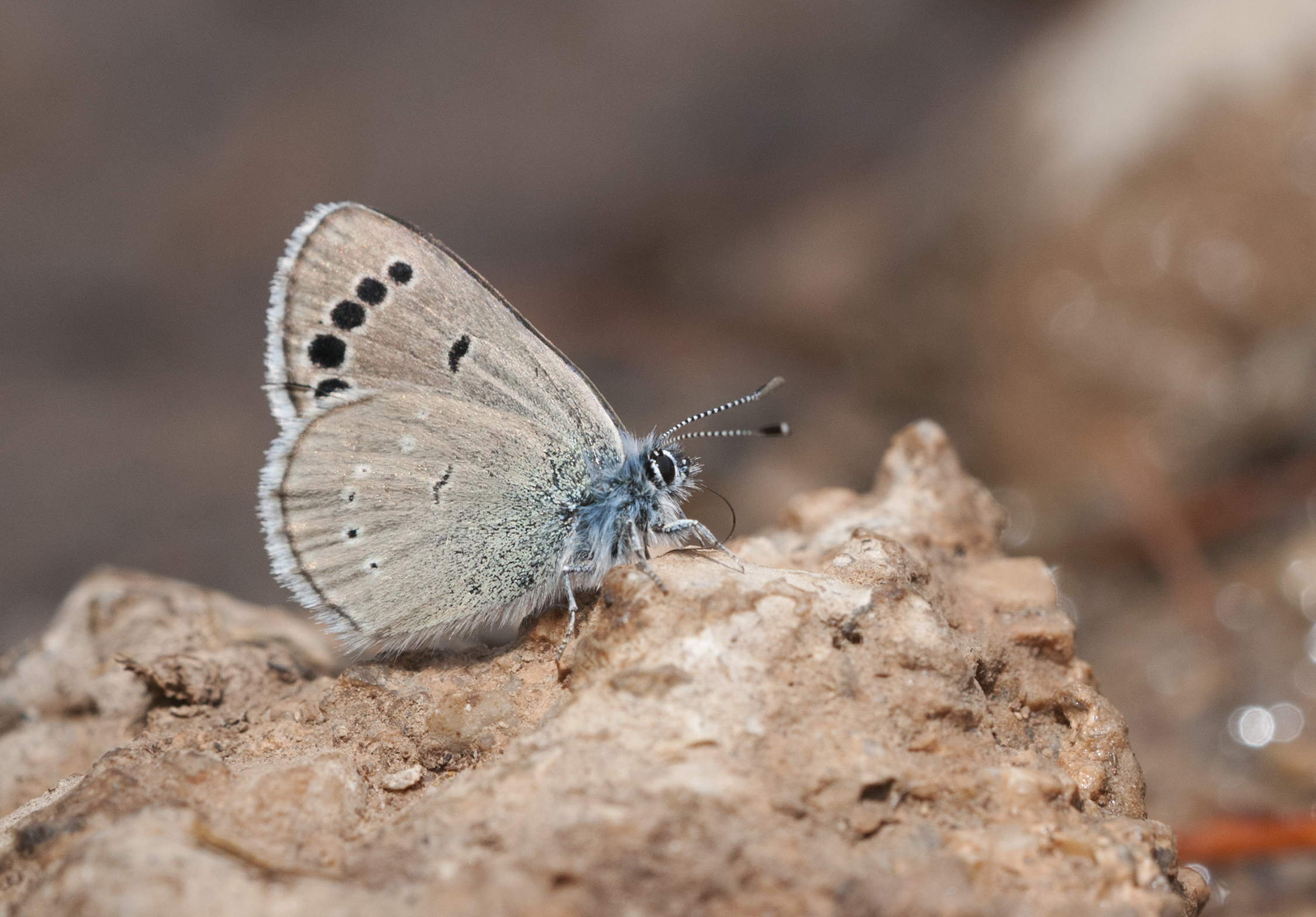

Scientific classification
- Domain: Eukaryota
- Kingdom: Animalia
- Phylum: Arthropoda
- Class: Insecta
- Order: Lepidoptera
- Family: Lycaenidae
- Genus: Glaucopsyche
- Species: G. astraea

Binomial name
- Glaucopsyche astraea (Freyer, 1852)

Synonyms
- Lycaena astraea Freyer, 1852

= Glaucopsyche astraea =

Species of butterfly

Glaucopsyche astraea is a species of butterfly in the family Lycaenidae. The species can be found throughout Turkey. The species has one subspecies:

- Glaucopsyche astraea eckweileri Koçak, 1979
