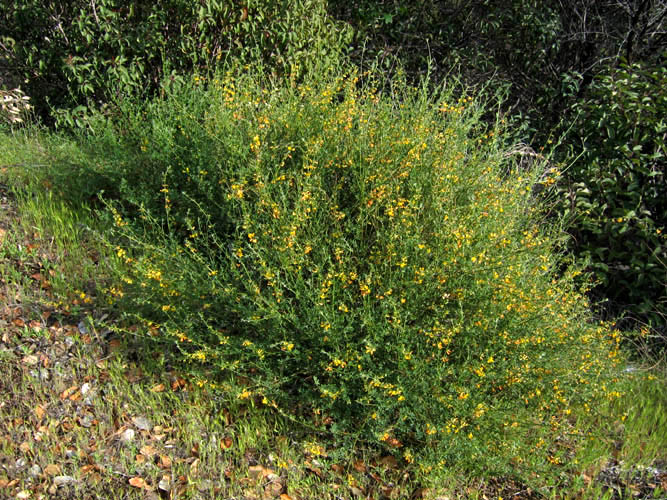

Conservation status
- Secure (NatureServe)

Scientific classification
- Kingdom: Plantae
- Clade: Tracheophytes
- Clade: Angiosperms
- Clade: Eudicots
- Clade: Rosids
- Order: Fabales
- Family: Fabaceae
- Subfamily: Faboideae
- Genus: Acmispon
- Species: A. glaber

Binomial name
- Acmispon glaber (Vogel) Brouillet

Synonyms
- Lotus scoparius (Nutt.) Ottley

= Acmispon glaber =

Species of shrub

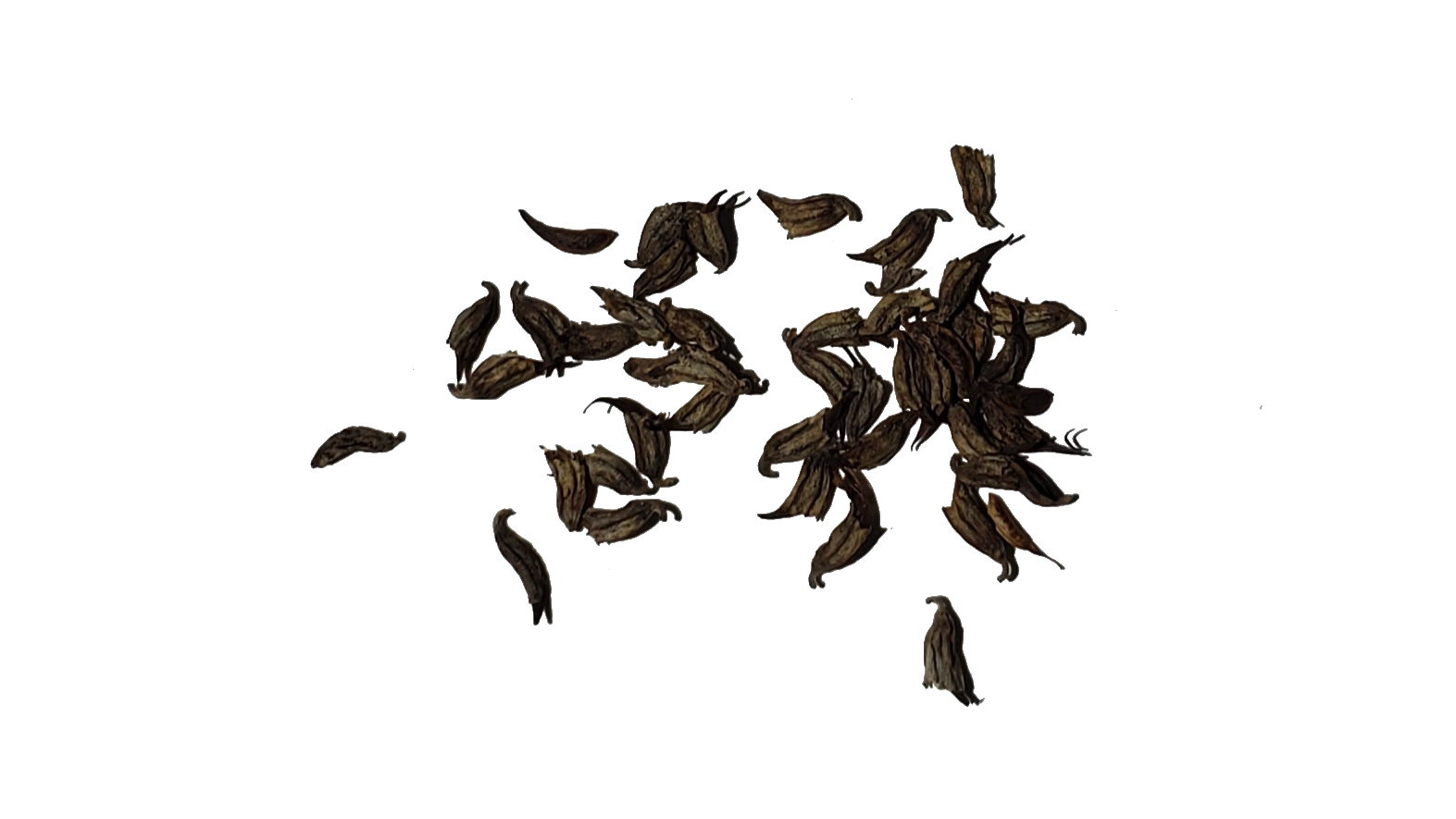
Curved fruits of Acmispon glaber

Acmispon glaber (previously Lotus scoparius) (common deerweed, deer weed, deervetch, California broom or western bird's-foot trefoil) is a perennial subshrub in the family Fabaceae (pea family). The plant is a pioneer species found in dry areas of California, Arizona, and Mexico. It is commonly found in many areas including chaparral, coastal sand and roadsides at elevations below 1500 m.

== Description ==
The Acmispon glaber stems are green, erect, somewhat branched, with small, deciduous, pinnate leaves consisting of three to six leaflets. The plant blooms from about March to August and has flowers that are bilateral, small (7–11 mm), yellow, and clustered together in an inflorescence consisting of two to seven flowers in the upper leaf axils. The flowers become reddish with age. The fruit consists of a curved legume with two seeds.

== Ecology ==
Acmispon glaber is a food consumed by numerous wildlife, providing intake for hummingbirds, bees, butterfly larvae, and deer. Among the larvae are the Acmon blue, Afranius duskywing, Avalon scrub hairstreak, bramble hairstreak, funereal duskywing, northern cloudywing, and at one point in time the extinct Xerces blue. Common plant associates in chaparral, especially in the transition between coastal chaparral and coastal sage scrub, include California sagebrush and toyon.

Landowners seeking to provide a home for reintroducing the Palos Verdes blue butterfly have been required to have sufficient Acmispon glaber plants to provide the butterflies with shelter.

Adult Acmispon glaber plants are usually killed by fire due to their thin epidermis and broom-like foliage that burns easily, but the seeds of Acmispon glaber are scarified by fire and readily germinate in the first rainy season after a fire. For 2 to 3 years after a fire in a sage scrub habitat, the flora consists primarily of herbaceous annuals and short-lived herbaceous perennials, but after the first 2–3 years, Acmispon glaber generally becomes dominant, being gradually replaced by long-lived shrubs after 5–10 years post-fire.

Due to their seeds' fire adaptation, Acmispon glaber benefits from heat scarification in cultivation. Heat treatment significantly increases germination rate.

- Acmispon glaber var. brevialatus is endemic to California.
