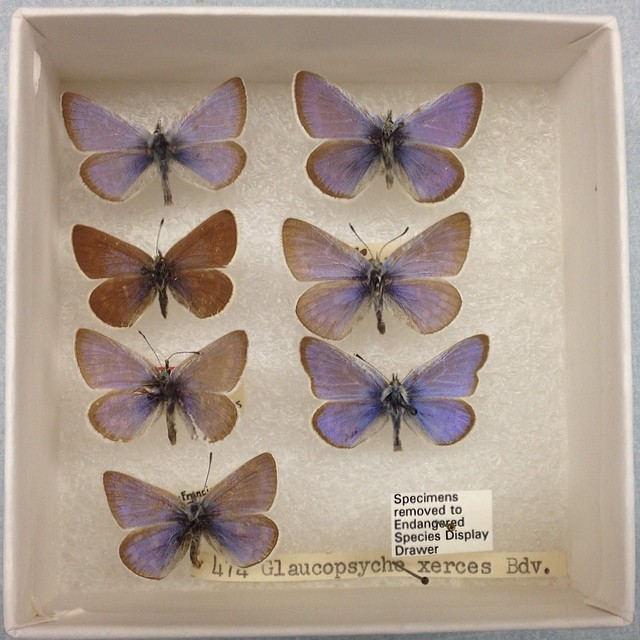
- Samples of the extinct Glaucopsyche xerces butterfly in the collections of the Field Museum of Natural History

Conservation status
- Extinct (early 1940s) (IUCN 3.1)

- Presumed Extinct (early 1940s) (NatureServe)

Scientific classification
- Kingdom: Animalia
- Phylum: Arthropoda
- Clade: Pancrustacea
- Class: Insecta
- Order: Lepidoptera
- Family: Lycaenidae
- Genus: Glaucopsyche
- Species: †G. xerces

Binomial name
- †Glaucopsyche xerces (Boisduval, 1852)

Synonyms
- Glaucopsyche lygdamus xerces

= Xerces blue =

Extinct species of butterfly

The Xerces blue (Glaucopsyche xerces) is an extinct species of butterfly in the gossamer-winged butterfly family, Lycaenidae. The species lived in coastal sand dunes of the Sunset District of the San Francisco Peninsula in California. The Xerces blue is believed to be the first American butterfly species to become extinct due to loss of habitat caused by urban development. The last Xerces blue was seen in 1941 or 1943 on land that is now part of the Golden Gate National Recreation Area.

== Taxonomy ==
Genetic analysis of museum specimens published in 2021 confirmed that the Xerces blue represented a distinct species within the genus Glaucopsyche, with its closest relatives being Glaucopsyche australis and Glaucopsyche pseudoxerces, with this group most closely related to Glaucopsyche lygdamus (the silvery blue).

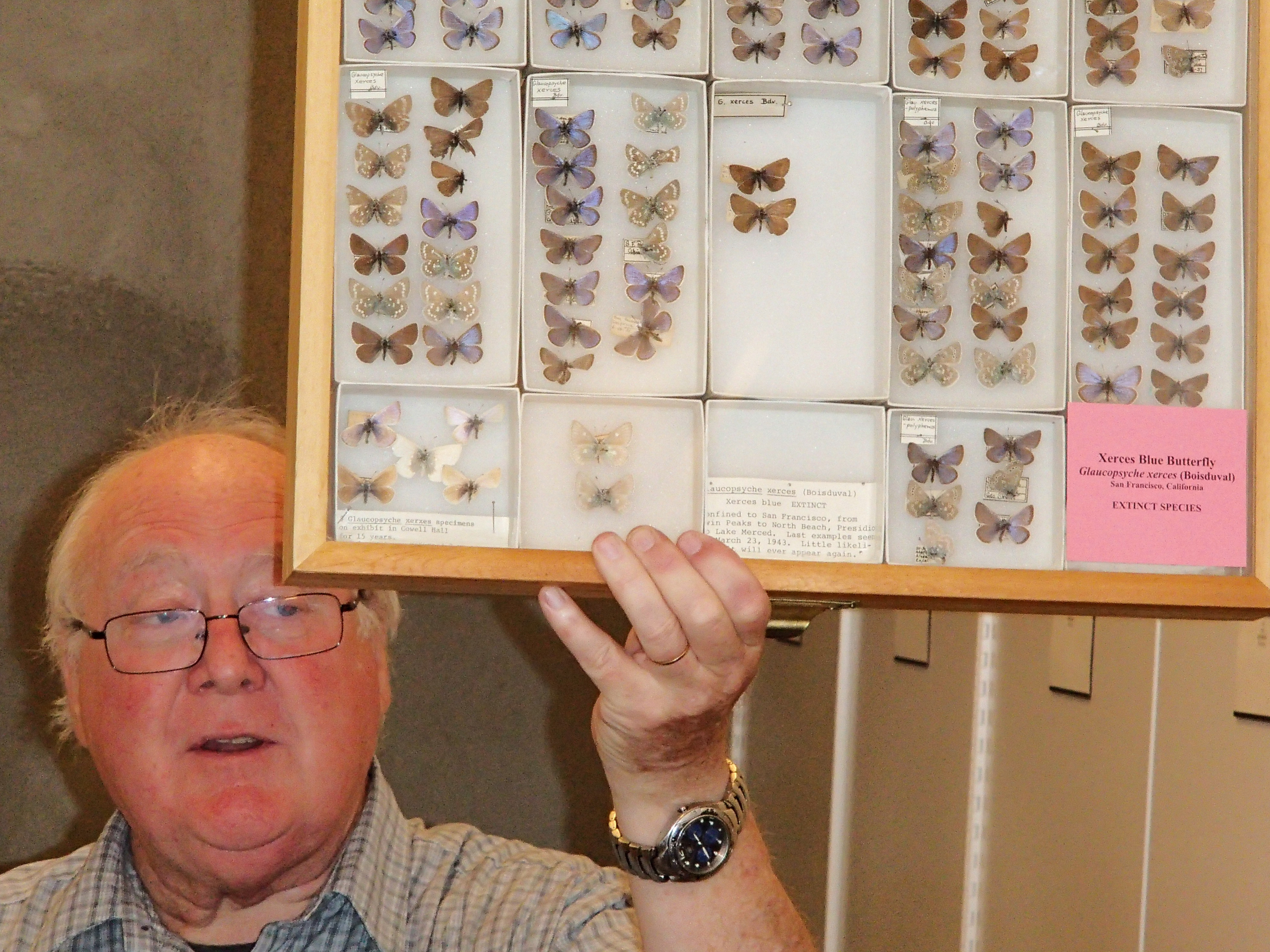
Specimens in California Academy of Sciences

== Extinction and ecology ==
The species was first described and documented in 1852. It was characterized by blue wings with white spots. The butterflies fed on vegetation belonging to the genus Lotus and Lupinus. The loss of the Lotus plant that the butterfly fed on while in its larval stages is believed to be one reason for the extinction of the Xerces blue. The plant could not survive in the disturbed soils due to human development and was no longer available to the Xerces blue. Lupinus, the Xerces blue's other vegetative food source, was not suitable for the larval stages.

Preserved specimens are found in California Academy of Sciences, Bohart Museum, and the Harvard Museum of Natural History.

== Reestablishment efforts ==
Efforts are ongoing to reestablish related butterflies in the Xerces blue's former habitat. The Palos Verdes blue (Glaucopsyche lygdamus palosverdesensis), which is considered a Los Angeles cousin of the Xerces, is being reared in labs. A new Xerces-like subspecies of the silvery blue (Glaucopsyche lygdamus), which the Xerces blue was thought to be a subspecies of has been discovered as well, and has been analyzed as a potential way to revive the Xerces blue. Successful reintroduction efforts of the silvery blue occurred in 2024 in a collaboration between the Presidio Land Trust, National Park Service, and California Academy of Sciences, among other groups. In 2025, silvery blue offspring were documented in the Lobos Creek Valley Dunes, implying successful reproduction within the Presidio. Releases of silvery blues have continued in 2025.
