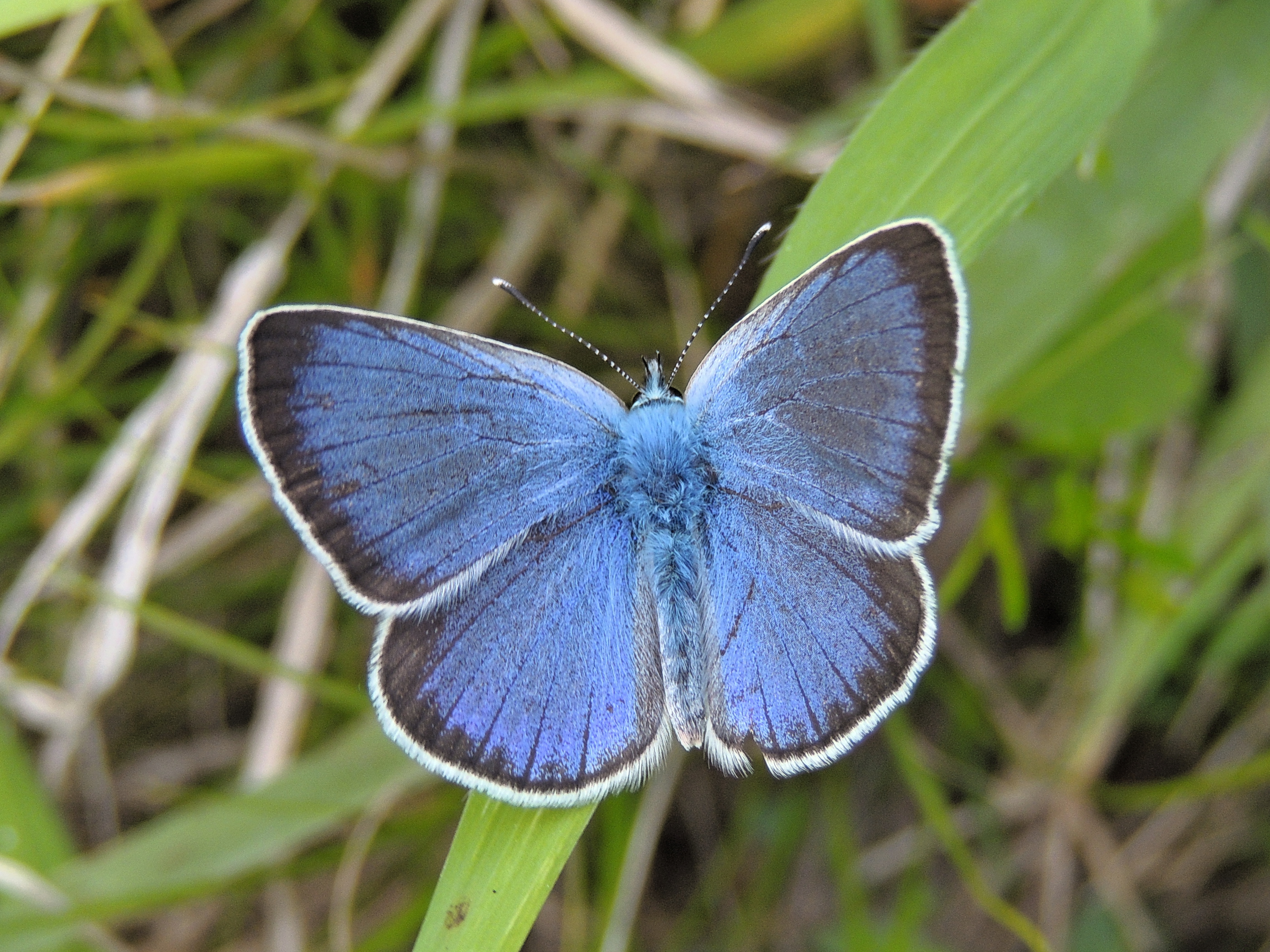

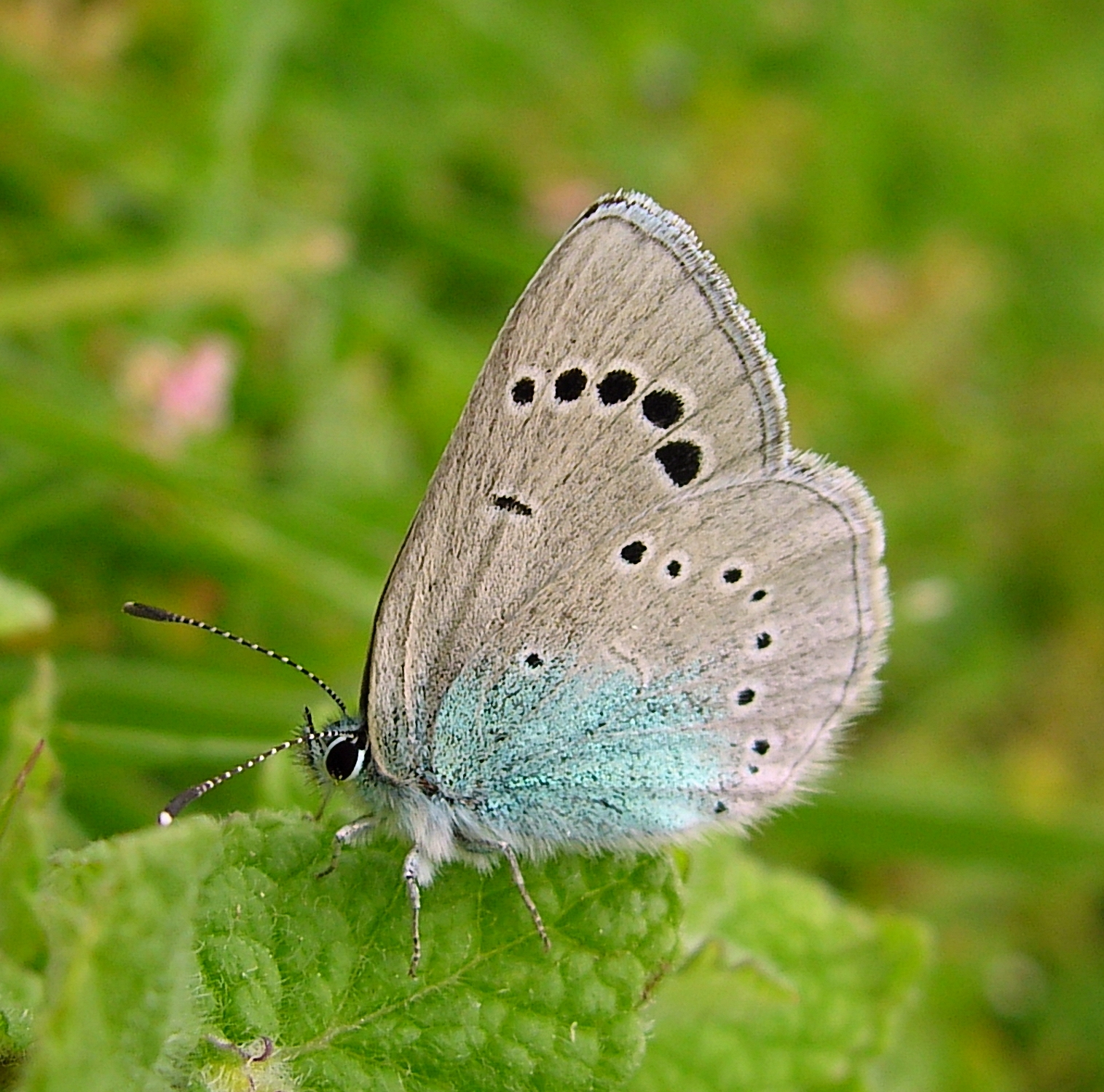
- Imagos of Glaucopsyche alexis, upper and underside, in Spain and Romania

Scientific classification
- Domain: Eukaryota
- Kingdom: Animalia
- Phylum: Arthropoda
- Class: Insecta
- Order: Lepidoptera
- Family: Lycaenidae
- Subfamily: Polyommatinae
- Tribe: Polyommatini
- Genus: Glaucopsyche; Scudder, 1872

Synonyms
- Apelles Hemming, 1931; Bajluana Korshunov & Ivonin, 1990; Phaedrotes Scudder, 1876

= Glaucopsyche =

Butterfly genus in family Lycaenidae

Glaucopsyche, commonly called blues, is a Holarctic genus of butterfly in the family Lycaenidae, found mainly in Palearctic Asia. For other species called "blues" see subfamily Polyommatinae and genus Plebejus.

== Species ==
- Glaucopsyche alexis (Poda, 1761) – green-underside blue
- Glaucopsyche alluaudi Oberthür, 1922 Morocco may be Glaucopsyche melanops subspecies alluaudi
- Glaucopsyche argali (Elwes, 1899)
  - Glaucopsyche argali argali southeast Altai
  - Glaucopsyche argali arkhar (Lukhtanov, 1990) Altai
- Glaucopsyche arizonensis McDunnough, 1936 Arizona may be Glaucopsyche lygdamus subspecies arizonensis
- Glaucopsyche astraea (Freyer, 1852) Asia Minor, Kurdistan
- Glaucopsyche charybdis (Staudinger, 1886) Central Asia
- Glaucopsyche damaetas (Denis & Schiffermüller, 1775) T.L. "neighbourhood of Vienna"
- Glaucopsyche exerces (Boisduval, 1852)
- Glaucopsyche grumi (Forster, 1938)
- Glaucopsyche iphicles (Staudinger, 1886)
- Glaucopsyche kurnakovi (Kurentzov, 1970) Kamchatka
- Glaucopsyche laetifica (Püngeler, 1898) Kazakhstan
- Glaucopsyche lycormas (Butler, 1866) Siberia, Mongolia, China, Korea and Japan
  - Glaucopsyche lycormas lycormas Japan
  - Glaucopsyche lycormas scylla (Oberthür, 1880) Amur Oblast, Ussuri
  - Glaucopsyche lycormas tomariana (Matsumura, 1928) Kunashir
- Glaucopsyche lygdamus (Doubleday, 1842) – silvery blue – North America
  - Glaucopsyche lygdamus incognita (Tilden, 1974) – Behr's blue – California
  - Glaucopsyche lygdamus palosverdesensis – Palos Verdes blue – California
  - Glaucopsyche lygdamus afra (Edwards, 1883)
  - Glaucopsyche lygdamus arizonensis McDunnough, 1936 Arizona
  - Glaucopsyche lygdamus columbia (Skinner, 1917)
  - Glaucopsyche lygdamus couperi Grote, 1874
  - Glaucopsyche lygdamus jacki Stallings & Turner, 1947
  - Glaucopsyche lygdamus maritima (Weeks, 1902) Baja California
  - Glaucopsyche lygdamus mildredi Chermock, 1944
  - Glaucopsyche lygdamus orcus (Edwards, 1869) California
  - Glaucopsyche lygdamus oro Scudder, 1876
- Glaucopsyche melanops (Boisduval, 1829) – black-eyed blue
  - Glaucopsyche melanops algirica (Heyne, 1895) North Africa and South Spain
  - Glaucopsyche melanops alluaudi (Oberthür, 1922) Morocco
- Glaucopsyche mertila (Edwards, 1866)
- Glaucopsyche paphos Chapman, 1920 – Paphos blue (endemic to Cyprus) may be Glaucopsyche melanops subspecies paphos
- Glaucopsyche pauper (Verity, 1919)
- Glaucopsyche piasus (Boisduval, 1852) – arrowhead blue – western North America
  - Glaucopsyche piasus daunia (Edwards, 1871)
  - Glaucopsyche piasus nevada Brown, 1975 Nevada
  - Glaucopsyche piasus sagittigera (C. & R. Felder, 1865) California
  - Glaucopsyche piasus toxeuma Brown, 1971
  - Glaucopsyche piasus umbrosa Emmel, Emmel & Mattoon, 1998 California
- Glaucopsyche seminigra Howarth & Povolny, 1976 Iran and Afghanistan
  - Glaucopsyche seminigra seminigra
  - Glaucopsyche seminigra sofidensis Blom, 1979
- †Glaucopsyche xerces (Boisduval, 1852) – Xerces blue (extinct) San Francisco, United States
