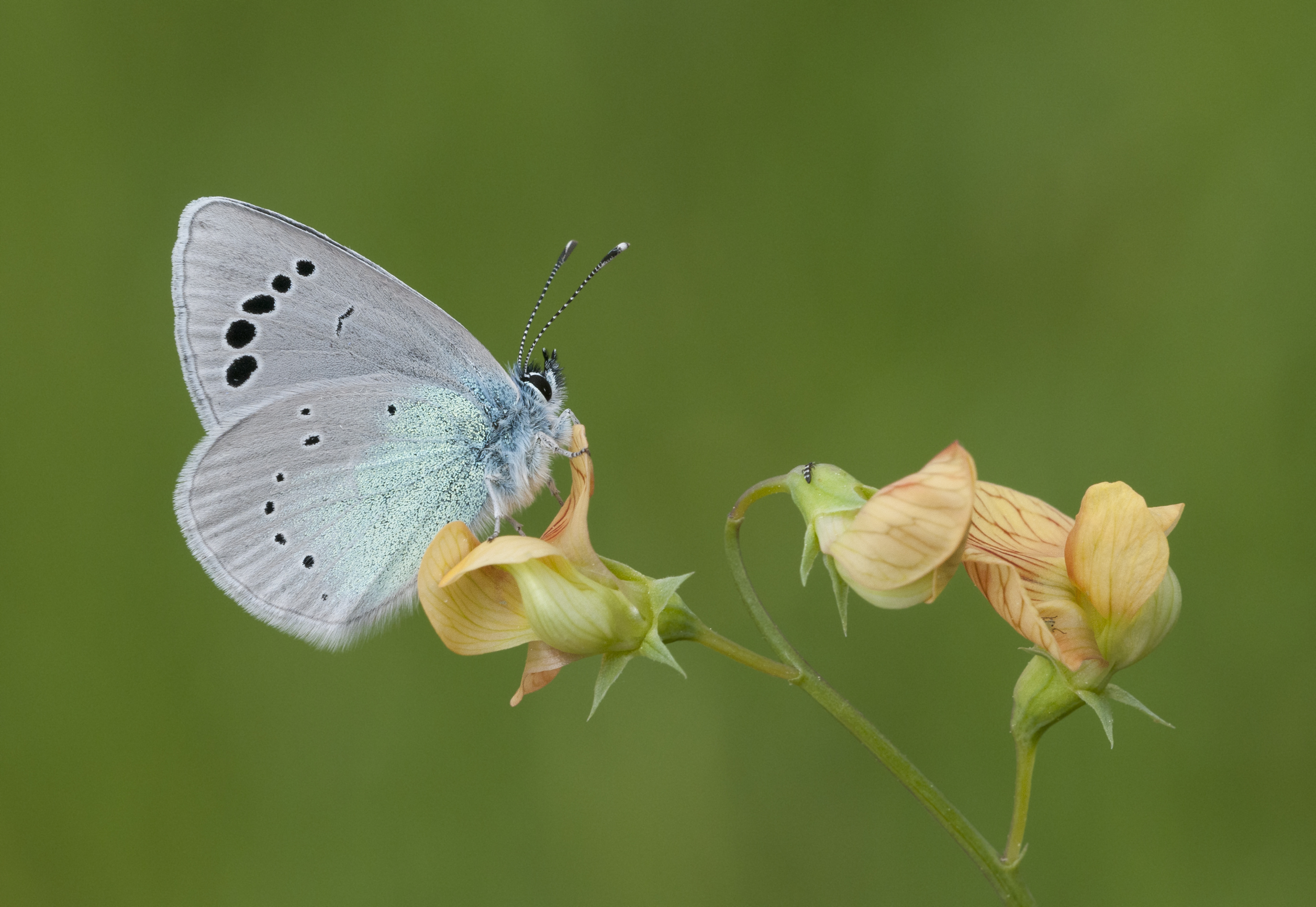

Scientific classification
- Kingdom: Animalia
- Phylum: Arthropoda
- Class: Insecta
- Order: Lepidoptera
- Family: Lycaenidae
- Genus: Glaucopsyche
- Species: G. alexis

Binomial name
- Glaucopsyche alexis Poda, 1761

= Glaucopsyche alexis =

Species of butterfly

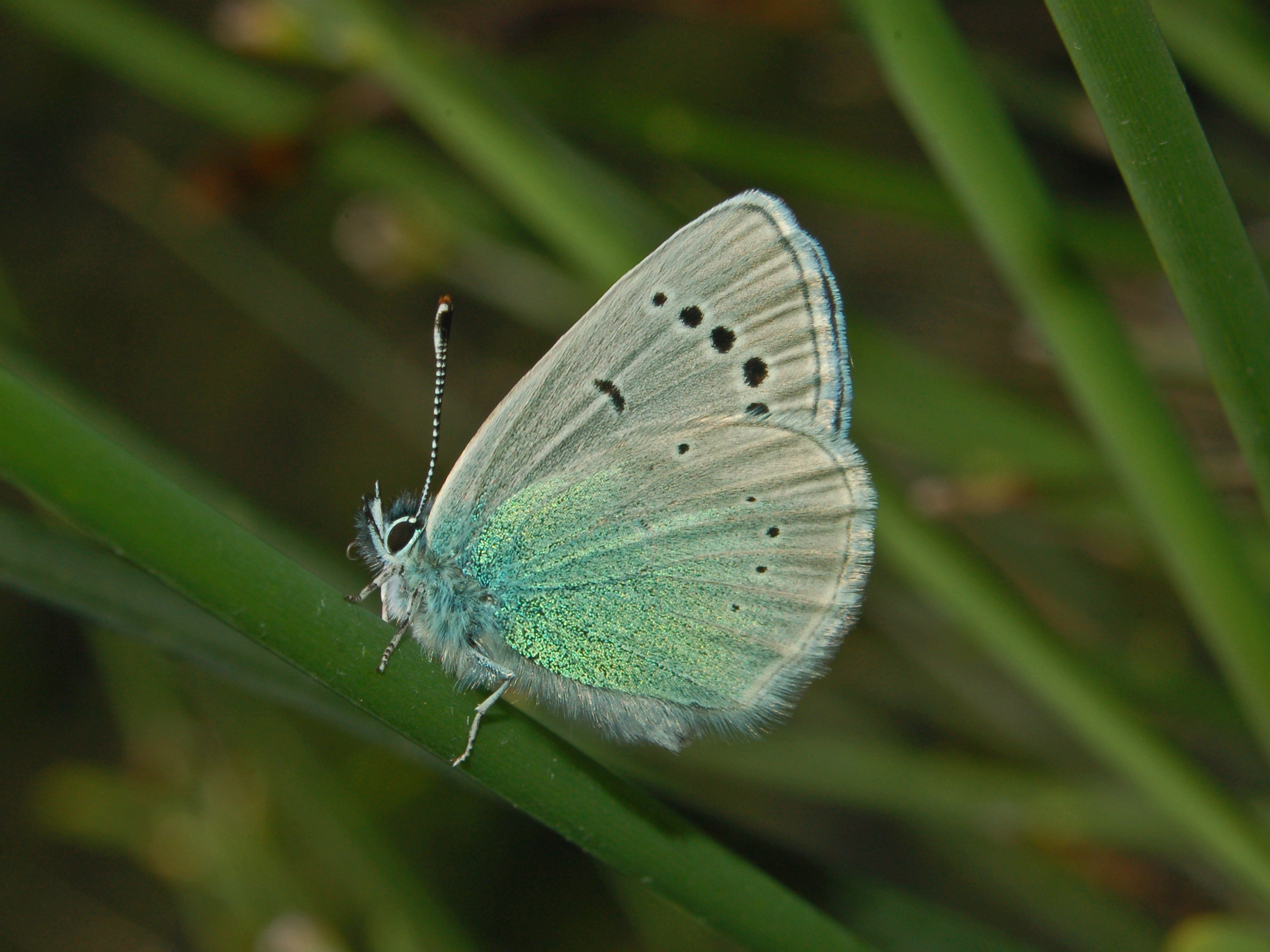

Glaucopsyche alexis, the green-underside blue, is a butterfly of the family Lycaenidae. It is found in the Palearctic.

The butterfly flies from April to July depending on the location, lingering in warm, lush meadows with plenty of its host plant, vetch (Vicia).

== Subspecies ==
- G. a. alexis southern and central Europe and Siberia
- G. a. blachieri (Milliére, 1887) Carpathians
- G. a. lugens (Caradja, 1893) Caucasus
- G. a. melanoposmater Verity, 1928 Algeria and Tunisia

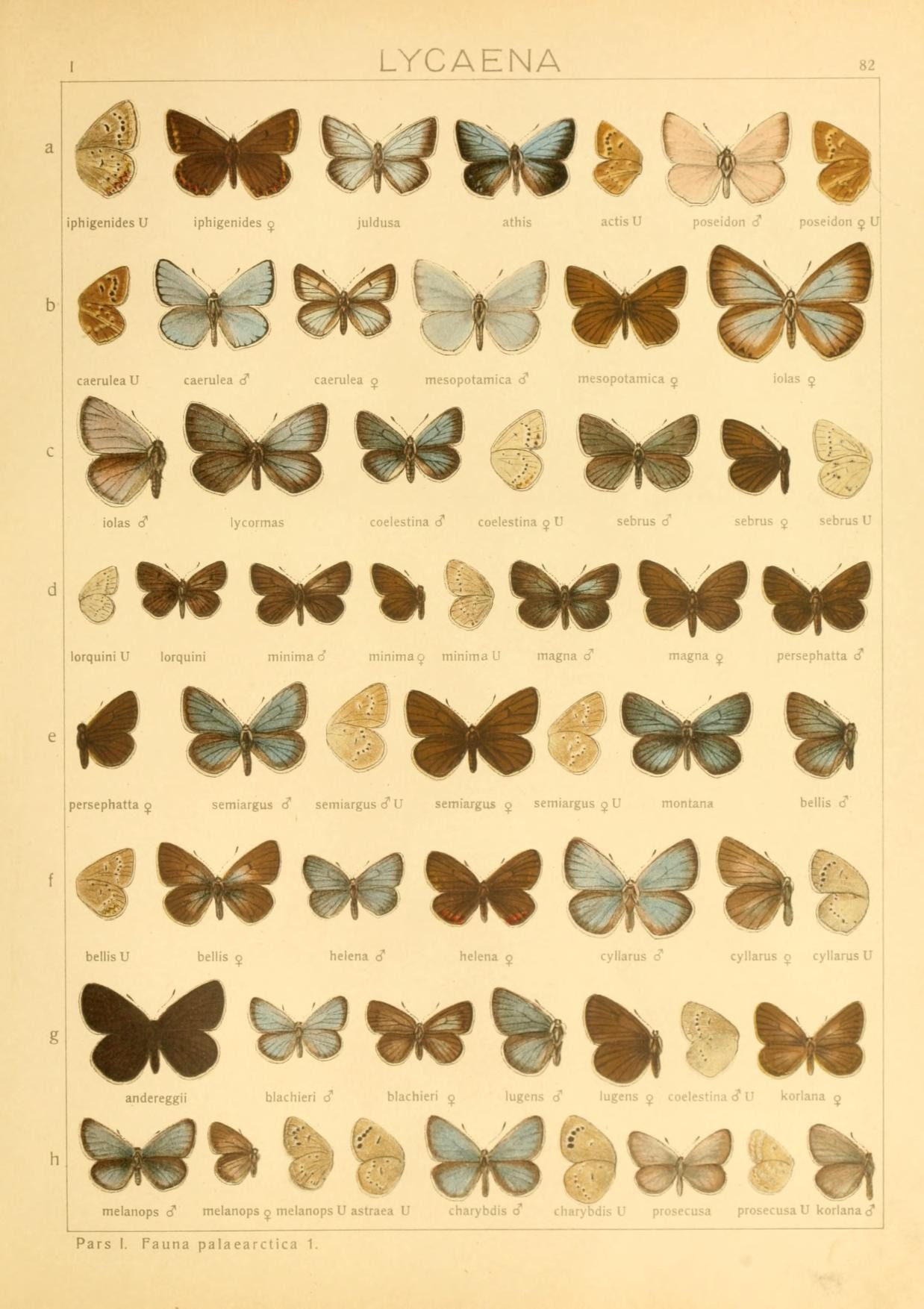
Seitz 82f

== Description from Seitz ==
L. cyllarus Rott. (= damoetas Schiff.) (82 f). Male above light cyaneous blue with a violet sheen and narrow black border; female darker blue with the black border gradually shading off, so that it occupies nearly the whole outer half of the wings. Beneath silver-grey (male) or ashy grey (female), the forewing with 5 or 6 large rounded black spots, the hindwing with small ocelli and in its whole basal half with metallic blue-green dusting. In ab. dimus Bgstr. the ocelli of the forewing beneath are reduced to 4; on the other hand, they may also be increased in number, or may be elongate (= subtus-radiata Oberth.). In European Turkey and the neighbouring districts of Anterior Asia the ocelli of the forewing appear to be constantly or at least commonly enlarged, the blue also being darker; this is ab. tristis Gerh.. Throughout Central and Southern Europe, North Africa and North Asia to the Amur; absent from England and Japan. — ab. andereggii Ruhl (82 g) occurs in the Alps (perhaps also elsewhere); it is a large female-form which is above entirely black-brown, the underside being dark ashy grey, with the very large ocelli placed in pale rings.— blachieri Mill. (82 g) is a very small form from Southern France and the Yalais which has beneath only 4 ocelli on the forewing and very scanty blue-green dusting at the base of the hindwing; above darker and duller blue. — coelestina Mill., nec Ev. (82 g) is similar to the preceding form; above very dull in colour, underside with blue-green scaling only in the basal half, the ocelli of the forewing reduced in size, those of the hindwing almost obsolete. — lugens Car. (82 g) has altogether lost the ocelli of the hindwing; the male is darker blue above, the female being entirely black-brown almost like the female of semiargus without any blue; the blue-green scaling on the hindwing beneath is entirely absent or nearly. — aeruginosa Stgr.,[now species Glaucopsyche aeruginosa (Staudinger, 1881)]from South Russia, Asia Minor (especially the Lebanon) into Central Asia, has the hindwing beneath entirely dusted with blue-green. — laetifica Pung., [now species Glaucopsyche laetifica (Püngeler, 1898)] from the Ili R., has similar underside, but the blue of the upperside is purer and more brilliant in both sexes; the club of the antenna has a different shape (being more elongate) and is reddish yellow on the innerside, so that Pungeler regarded laetifica as being perhaps a distinct species. — Larva green or brownish, with reddish brown dorsal line accompanied by dark oblique parallel stripes which stand close together; head black. In June and the autumn on Cytisus, Genista, Astragalus, Melilotus, etc. Pupa greyish brown. North of the Alps, where occurs only one brood, the larva probably hibernates. The butterflies occur singly but are mostly common, being found on clearings in timber-woods and on wide roads, where they flutter along usually 1 to 2 m above the ground, with a slow, straight, flapping flight. They appear in the South in the spring and again from July onwards, in the North only once, at the end of May and in June.

== Biology ==
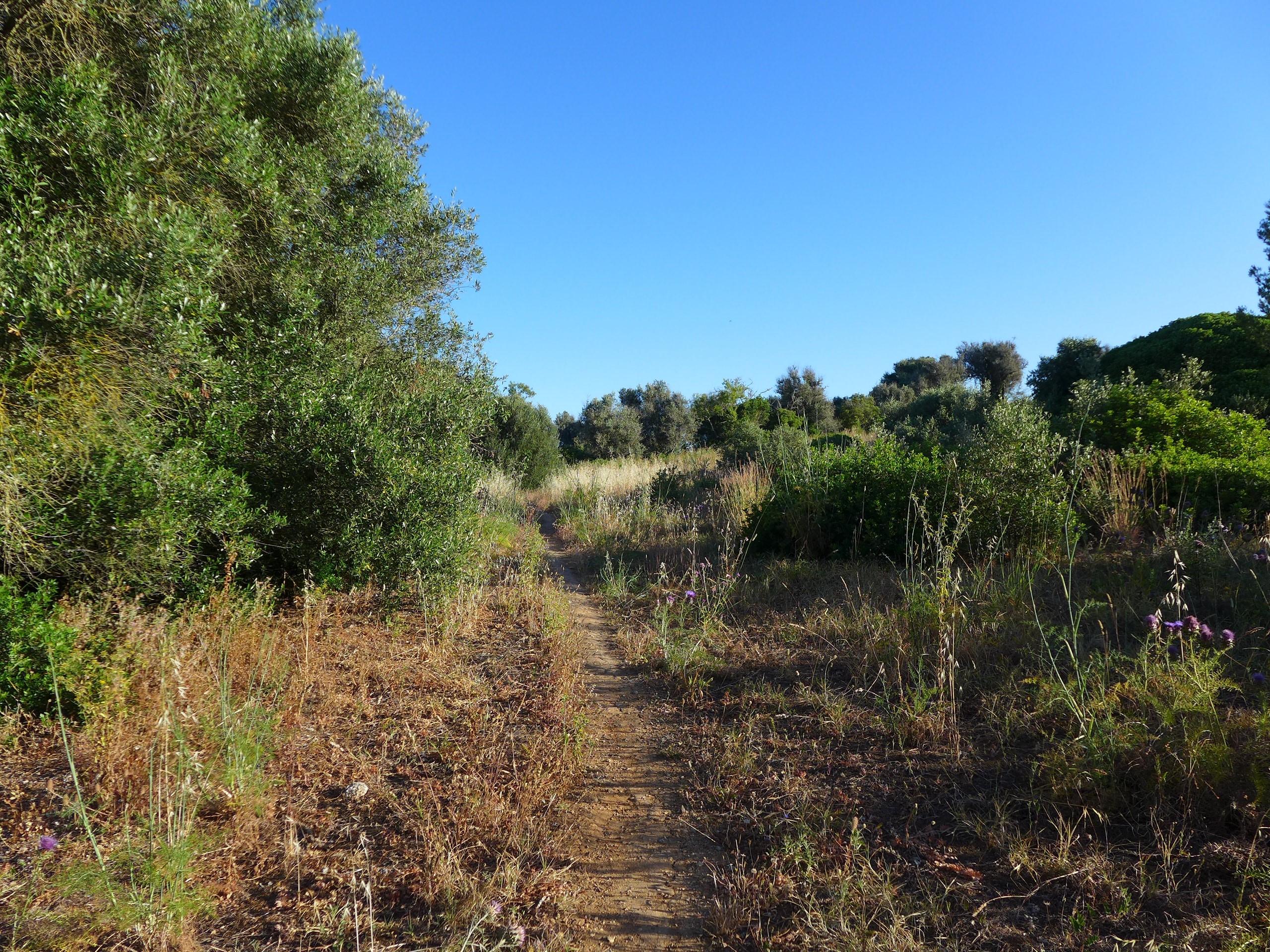
Habitat in Portugal

Habitats include xerophytic meadows along river valleys, meadows of various types, dry woodlands and wastelands, glades, stony outcrops, sunny dry meadows of pine forests, parks. In the south of the range, it inhabits chalk steppes, steppe gullies, banks of irrigation canals. In the Caucasus, it is found in subalpine tall grass flowering meadows.

== Etymology ==
Named in the Classical tradition. Alexis is a shepherd and poet in the poetry of Virgil and Horace.
