= White Point (Jackson County, Oregon) =

Summit in Oregon, US

Coordinates: 42°46′23″N 122°33′08″W

White Point is a summit in the U.S. state of Oregon. The elevation is 5,016 feet (1,529 m).

White Point was named for deposits of white rock.
