= Palos Verdes blue =

Conservation status
- Critically Imperiled (NatureServe)

Scientific classification
- Kingdom: Animalia
- Phylum: Arthropoda
- Class: Insecta
- Order: Lepidoptera
- Family: Lycaenidae
- Genus: Glaucopsyche
- Species: G. lygdamus
- Subspecies: G. l. palosverdesensis

Trinomial name
- Glaucopsyche lygdamus palosverdesensis E. Perkins and J. Emmel, 1977

Subspecies of butterfly

The Palos Verdes blue (Glaucopsyche lygdamus palosverdesensis) is a small endangered butterfly native to the Palos Verdes Peninsula in southwest Los Angeles County, California, United States. As its distribution has been proven to be limited to one single site, it has one of the best claims to being the world's rarest butterfly.

== Overview ==
The Palos Verdes blue (G. l. palosverdesensis) is a localized subspecies of the silvery blue (G. lygdamus), which ranges over much of North America. It was described in 1977, shortly before it became one of the second groups of butterflies to be listed under the US Endangered Species Act in 1980. It is distinguished from other subspecies of G. lygdamus by its slightly different patterning on the underside of the wing and an earlier flight period. The subspecies was described from the southern slope of the Palos Verdes Peninsula in coastal Los Angeles County.

The Palos Verdes blue butterfly was thought to be driven to extinction in 1983, primarily by development of its habitat. The last three to six known individuals were seen and photographed in March, 1983, but the site they occupied was scraped shortly after for fire control. In 1994, the butterfly was rediscovered by Rick Rogers, Rudi Mattoni, and Timothy Dahlum at the Defense Fuel Support Point in San Pedro, which is located on the northern (inland) side of the Palos Verdes Peninsula. This new population lays eggs on an additional food plant (common deerweed, Acmispon glaber) but shares physical and behavioral characteristics with the other now-extinct populations.

== Biology ==
=== Taxonomy and systematics ===
Glaucopsyche lygdamus palosverdesensis is a subspecies of Glaucopsyche lygdamus (the "silvery blue"), a species of butterfly found throughout North America. There are currently 11 subspecies of silvery blue. G. lygdamus palosverdesensis was first described in the 1970s and was distinguished from other G. lygdamus by its faster and early flight, wing color and wing spot patterns.

=== Morphology ===
The Palos Verdes blue butterfly has a wingspan of only 25–30 mm (0.98–1.18 in). The male has a bright silvery-blue dorsal wing outlined in a narrow line of black, while the female's dorsal wing is a more brownish-gray colour. Both males and females have gray ventral wings with dark spots surrounded by white rings.

=== Habitat ===
G. lygdamus palosverdesensis persists particularly on the Palos Verdes Peninsula, 15 miles south of Los Angeles, in a coastal sage scrub habitat. This subspecies is locally monophagous, or particular to one species of food plant. The entire subspecies was originally thought to be particular only to the locoweed or rattlepod (Astragalus trichopodus lonchus), but the population rediscovered in 1994 used common deerweed (Lotus scoparius) as its larval food plant. These two types of plants are fast becoming scarce on the Palos Verdes Peninsula because of housing development. Retention of these larval food plants is essential for conservation of the Palos Verdes blue.

=== Life stages ===
Oviposition, laying of eggs on the larval food plant, occurs only once a breeding season for the Palos Verdes blue. There are at least four larval instars, or stages of development. After 7 to 10 days the larvae emerge and crawl to the base of the food plant where they pupate. Pupae remain in diapause until emerging as adults. The flight period and reproductive period occur together, beginning in late January and ending in early May. It is rare to see the Palos Verdes blue far from its home food patch, but research shows that males cover more distance and have longer periods of flight. Palos Verdes blues are a diurnal and panmictic subspecies. They are also non-migratory and very particular in their use of larval food plants. Their adult lifespan is only five days.

=== Relationships with other species ===
Interspecific competition may occur with other lycaenid butterflies for the larval food plant. A mutualism between ants and larvae has been observed during the instars of butterfly development. G. l. palosverdesensis has a host-parasite relationship with its larval food plants, Astragalus lonchus and Lotus scoparius. Predation by western yellowjackets (Vespula pensylvanica) on the Palos Verdes blue has also been observed at the Defense Fuel Point location.

== Conservation ==
=== Laws ===
G. lygdamus palosverdesensis was listed as an "endangered species" by the United States Fish and Wildlife Service on July 2, 1980. This listing also included city-owned critical habitat, plus comments and recommendations for species conservation. Insects are not currently protected by California laws.

=== Threats ===
The main threat to the Palos Verdes blue has been habitat destruction due to weeds and rototilling, which has negative effects on the essential larval food plants. Recreational, commercial, or residential development of the Palos Verdes Peninsula is also a major concern in preservation of the food plants.

=== Court case ===
In 1982, the city of Rancho Palos Verdes bulldozed the then most extensive known habitat of the butterfly to build a baseball field, an act believed to have been a principal cause of the die-off of the subspecies before its rediscovery in 1994. The US Fish and Wildlife Service maintained that the city was "well aware" of the butterfly and the site status. According to the Los Angeles Times, the mayor of the city "said no one complained about butterfly destruction until grading had been completed." In 1987, the city was charged by the federal government with violating the Endangered Species Act (ESA). The case was dismissed later that year by a federal court, which said a municipality was not a person for purposes of the ESA, and thus could not be held criminally responsible. The following year, the US Congress responded by amending the act to include any "individual, corporation, partnership, trust, association, or any other private entity; or any officer, employee, agent, department, or instrumentality of the Federal Government, of any State, municipality, or political subdivision of a State, or of any federal government; any State, municipality, or political subdivision of a State; or any other entity subject to the jurisdiction of the United States."

=== Reintroduction ===
The Palos Verdes Peninsula is split into the north and south slopes. On the north slope, reintroduction is suggested based on presence of deerweed (Acmispon glaber) and a native plant index number. The only habitat known so far on the north slope is the Defense Fuel Support Point location. The south slope has many more historic sites of Palos Verdes blue, which are all suggested for reintroduction, including any more sites containing locoweed (Astragalus). Particular sites of reintroduction and rehabilitation of the Palos Verdes blue include Defense Fuel Support Point in San Pedro and the Linden H. Chandler Preserve. In conjunction with other organizations, the Palos Verdes Peninsula Land Conservancy is installing and maintaining coastal sage scrub habitat on the slopes around the fuel tanks to benefit the blue butterfly. The Urban Wildlands Group, a nonprofit organization "dedicated to the conservation of species, habitats, and ecological processes in urban and urbanizing areas", conducts the captive breeding program. This program is a collaboration with Moorpark College and is directed by Moorpark College professor Dr. Jana Johnson.

Since that time, the Defense Logistics Agency, which operates the facility, has funded habitat restoration and a breeding program for the blue butterfly. Honey, produced on the premises, is provided to the captive rearing program so the butterflies are able to feed on the same food source as its wild companions. Major Jason Pike, an entomologist for the Defense Logistics Agency who has been monitoring the project, commented, "The military takes its responsibilities for endangered species on its properties very seriously, and DLA is pleased to provide support for the blue butterfly project."

=== Mass rearing ===
Mass rearing of the Palos Verdes blue has been taking place since rediscovery in 1994. The mass rearing is conducted for conservation purposes, reintroduction and prevention of extinction. The mass rearing takes place in "tent" cages containing both known larval food plants. It has been variably successful. In 2008, 2,400 butterflies were raised in a laboratory at Moorpark College. In addition to accepting the conditions of the butterflies' protected status, landowners seeking to house the butterflies needed to prove they could provide sufficient numbers of "yellow-flowering deer weed plants."

=== Modeling ===
Although population viability analysis models are often very important for predicting the outcome of conservation efforts, there have been many problems with using population viability analysis models to predict Palos Verdes blue populations. This type of modeling has proved inconclusive mainly because the Palos Verdes blue utilizes habitat so variably, depending on climatic and successional changes. So far, the appropriate habitat has been hard to find, and expert intuition has often been wrong. Long-term population studies are not available to provide this information because of the many local extinctions and declining numbers of this subspecies. For this reason, the subspecies long-term viability is very difficult to predict.

=== Key conservationists ===
Current conservation efforts are supported by the Defense Logistics Agency and the U.S. Navy and implemented by the Palos Verdes Peninsula Land Conservancy, The Urban Wildlands Group, and The Butterfly Project led by biologist Jana J. Johnson at Moorpark College. The Youth Environmental Service program of the Palos Verdes / South Bay Audubon Society and other volunteer groups have provided help weeding and establishing habitat for the butterfly. The Youth Environmental Service (YES) program started in 2012 and focuses on conserving the Linden H. Chandler Preserve, where they work on restoring native plants for the Palos Verdes blue butterfly.

== See also ==
- El Segundo blue
