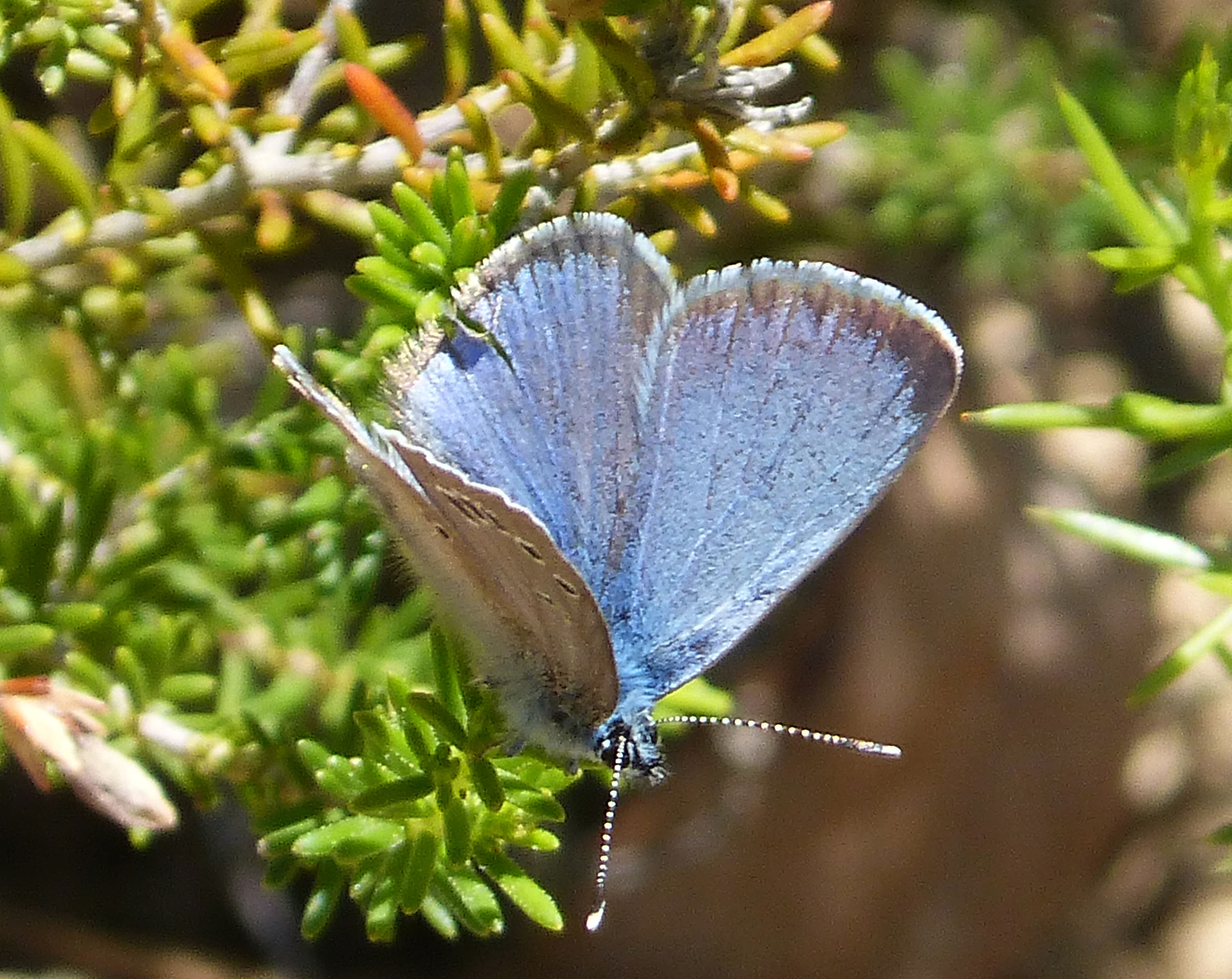

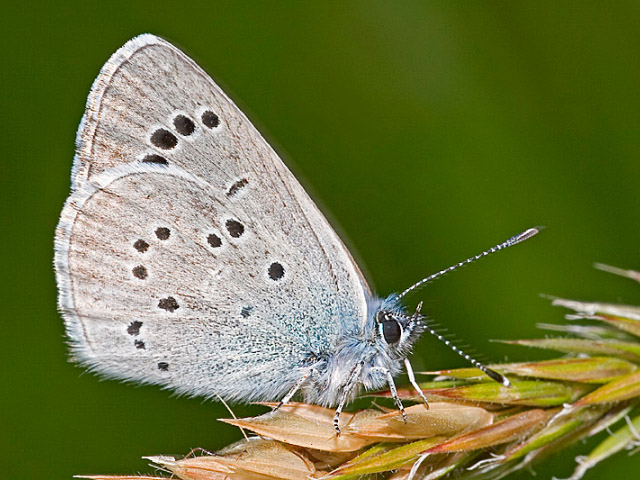
- Imagos in Spain

Scientific classification
- Domain: Eukaryota
- Kingdom: Animalia
- Phylum: Arthropoda
- Class: Insecta
- Order: Lepidoptera
- Family: Lycaenidae
- Genus: Glaucopsyche
- Subgenus: Glaucopsyche (Glaucopsyche)
- Species: G. melanops

Binomial name
- Glaucopsyche melanops Boidsduval, 1828
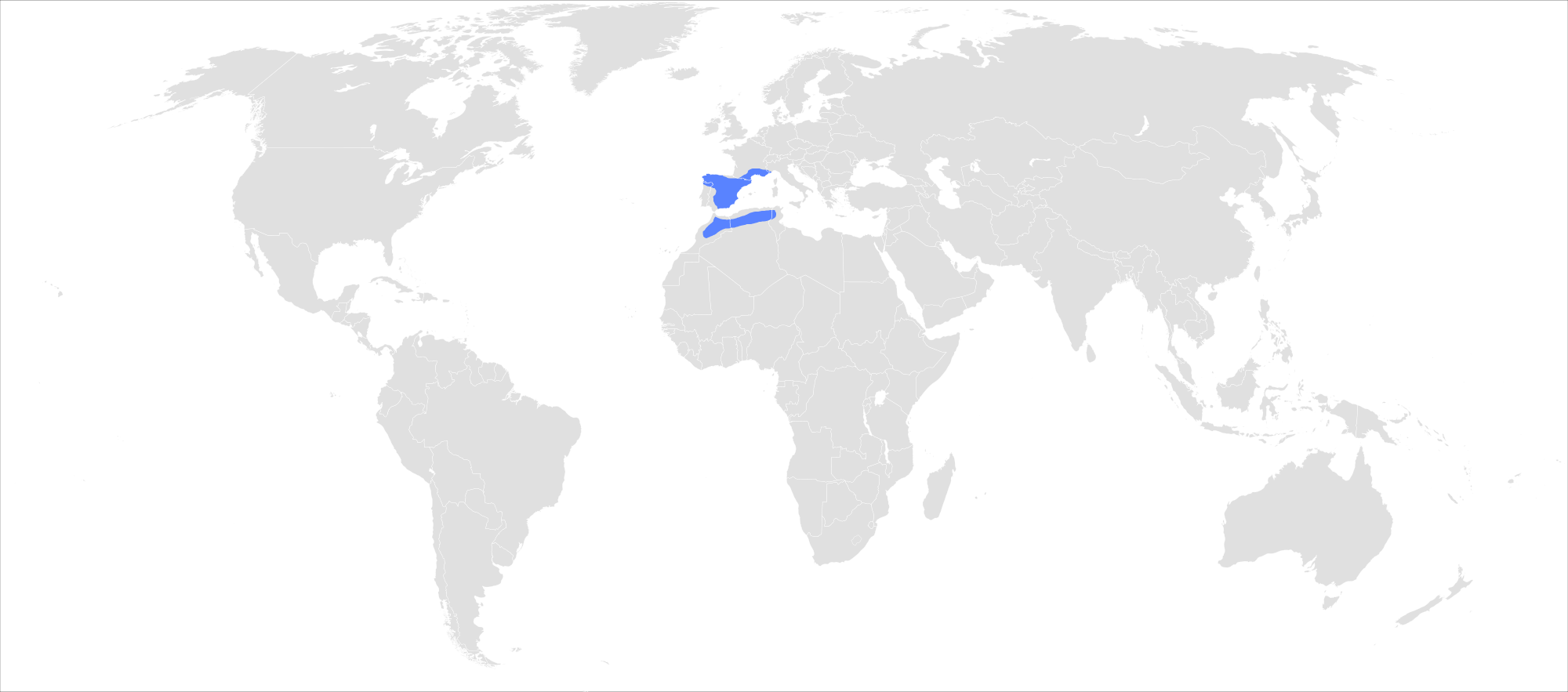
- range

Synonyms
- Polyommatus melanops Boisduval, 1828

= Glaucopsyche melanops =

Black-eyed blue

Species of butterfly

Glaucopsyche melanops, the black-eyed blue, is a butterfly of the family Lycaenidae. It is found in the western part of Southern Europe and North Africa.

The length of the forewings is 11–13 mm. The butterfly flies from May to July depending on the location.

The larvae feed on Fabaceae species.

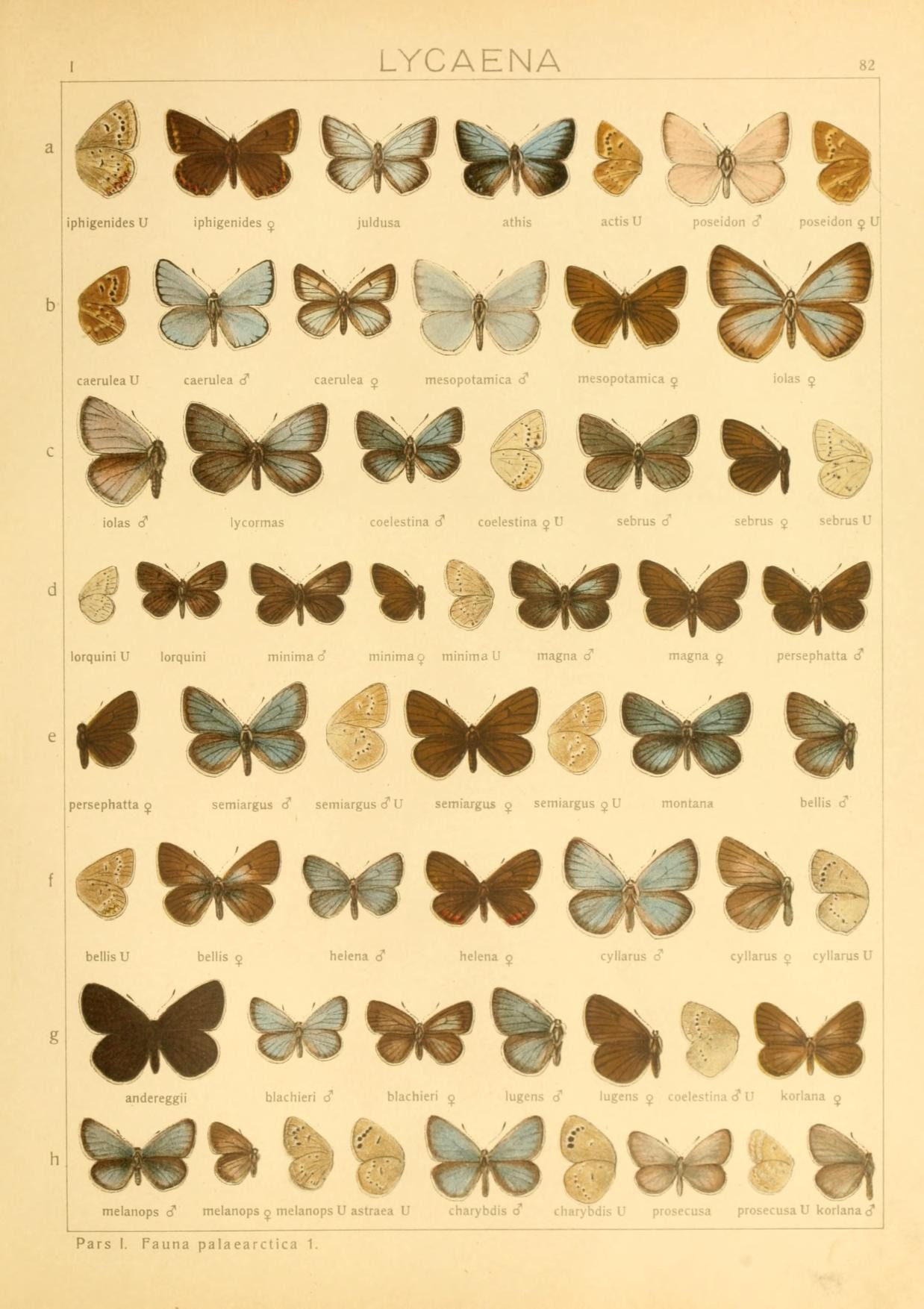
Seitz 82h

== Description from Seitz ==
L. melanops Bdv. (= saportae Hbn.) (82 h). Above similar to the smallest varieties of cyllarus, but the ocelli of the forewing beneath are enlarged, usually much more than in our figure; the row, moreover, is strongly curved and the ocelli gradually increase in size from the first to the fifth, the sixth ocellus, if present, being smaller again. In South- West Europe, ab. elongata Courv. (= marchandii Gerh.) has elongate ocelli; ab. marchandii Bdv. is beneath without ocelli. — In North Africa there occurs a considerably larger form with broader black margin to the forewing and somewhat darker underside; this is algirica Ruhl-Heyne. — Larva pale green, with thin dark markings; a brownish dorsal stripe and a white side-line, between which a dark green pencilling; head black. Until June on Dorycynium. Pupa pale brown, with black dots on the sides. In spring, usually frequent wherever it occurs.

== Biology ==
The habitat is garrigue, degraded orchards and scrub, hot dry grassfield margins and woodland edge between 100m-800m. Larval foodplants include Lotus dorycnium, Sulla flexuosa (Hedysarum flexuosum L.).Adults feed on various small composites.

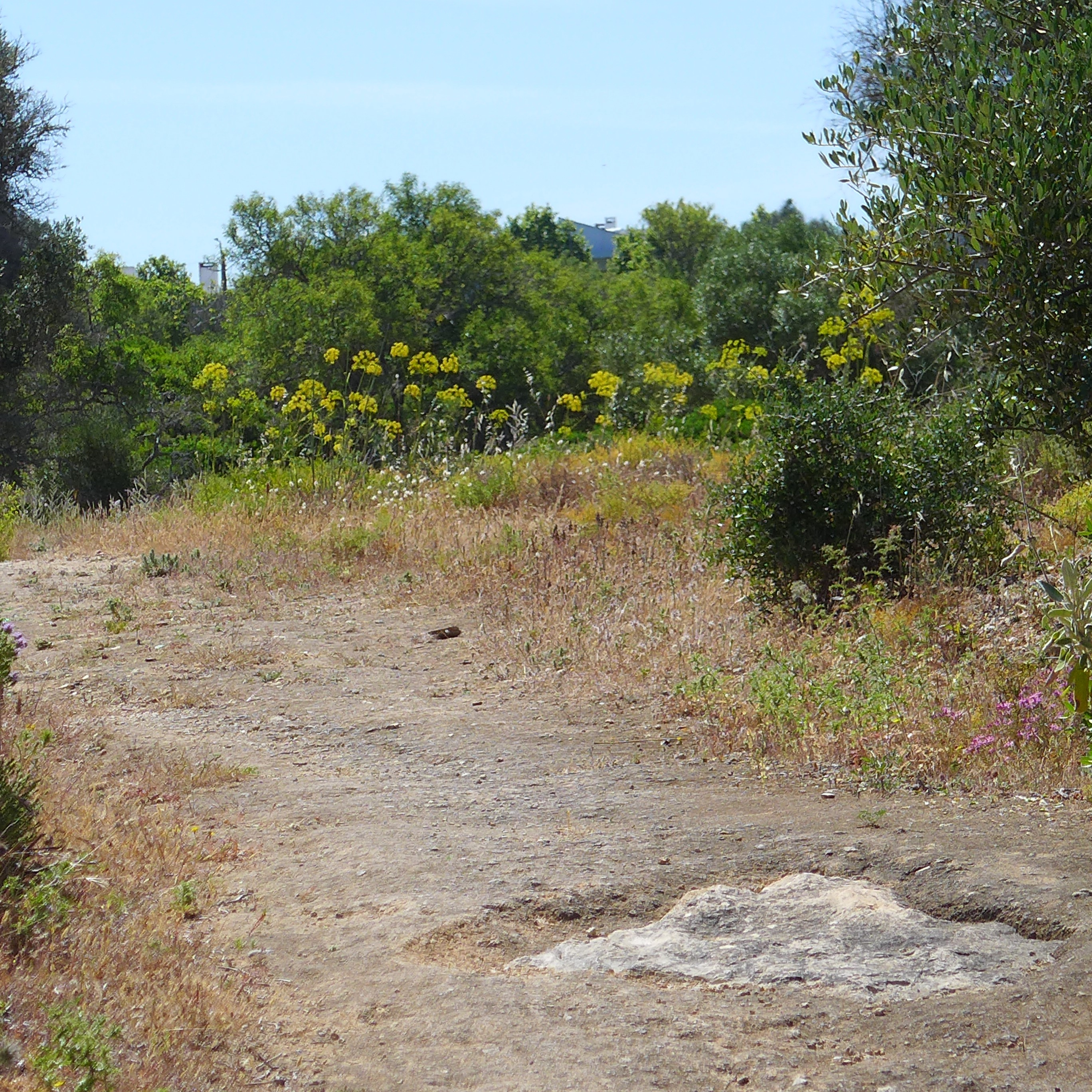
Habitat in Portugal
