= Palos Verdes Peninsula Land Conservancy =

Non-profit organization in California

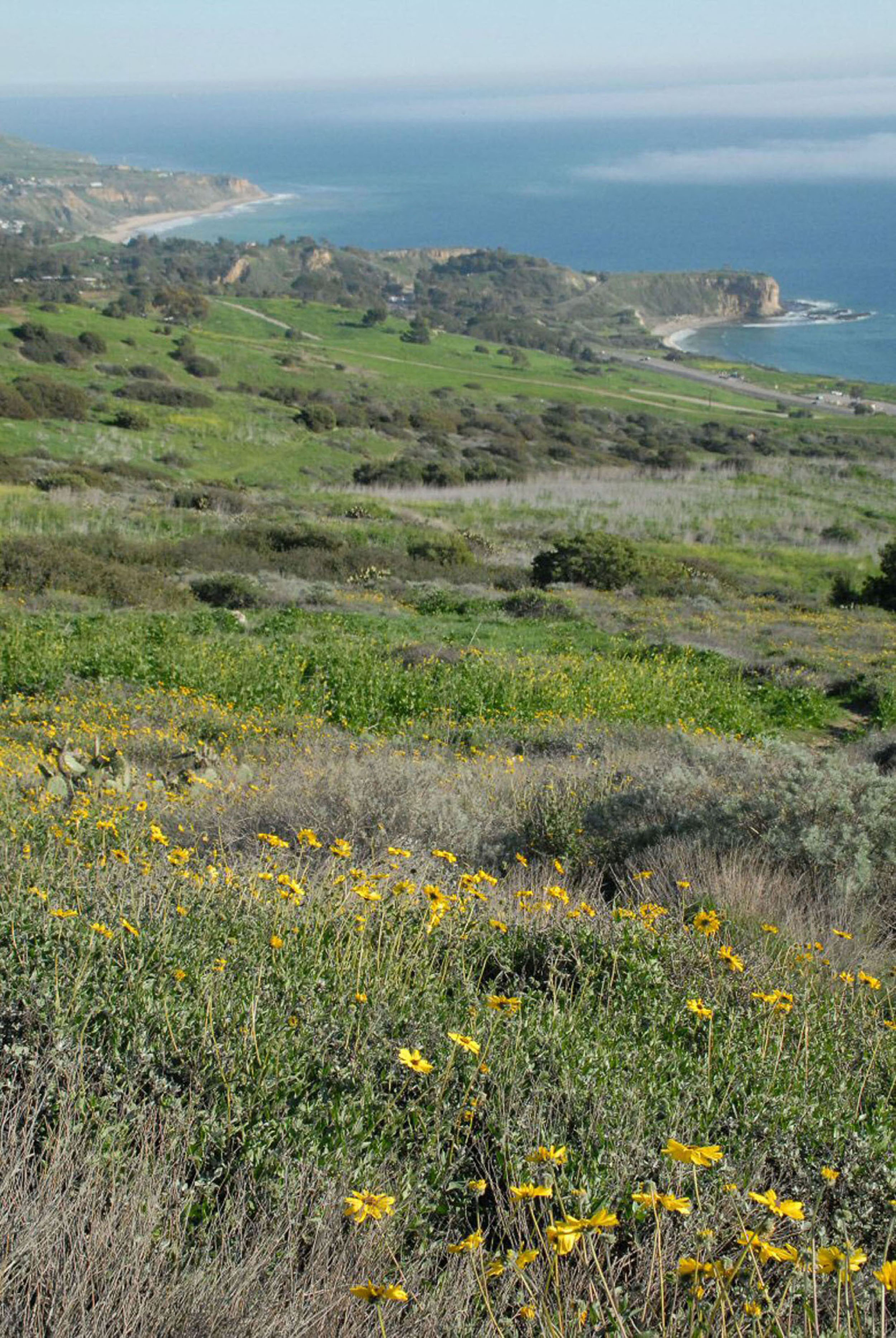
A trail in the Palos Verdes Nature Preserve, overlooking Coastal sage scrub and the Pacific Ocean

The Palos Verdes Peninsula Land Conservancy (PVPLC) is a non-profit organization that is based on the Palos Verdes Peninsula in southwestern Los Angeles County, California.

Its mission is "Preserving land and restoring habitat for the education and enjoyment of all".

The Conservancy is a land trust and environmental organization to protect natural areas in the Palos Verdes Hills and adjacent coastal Palos Verdes Peninsula areas. Habitats protected include those of the California chaparral and woodlands ecoregion and its Coastal sage scrub and Southern coastal grasslands subregions.

== Preserves ==
Founded in 1988, the Conservancy has protected 1,600 acres (6.5 km^{2}) of open space as nature preserves on the Palos Verdes Peninsula.

=== White Point Nature Preserve ===
The White Point Nature Preserve is located in San Pedro and features 102 acres (0.41 km^{2}) of restored coastal sage scrub habitat, hiking and handicap access trails, and a Nature Education Center overlooking the ocean and Santa Catalina Island.

According to the Land Conservancy, White Point Nature Preserve was formerly owned and operated by the US military as a Nike missile site. When the City of Los Angeles purchased the land back, it was designated to the Conservancy in 2000. A 25-year agreement was made with the Conservancy and the City to help restore the native plant species and habitat for both native flora and fauna. The White Point Nature Preserve was established and opened for the public to enjoy its scenery, trails, and education program in 2003.

The White Point Nature Education Center has been constructed from an old missile assembly building and provides visitors with exhibits showcasing the Preserve's rich cultural and ecological history. The site once belonged to the Tongva, an indigenous tribe from the Los Angeles Basin and the Southern Channel Islands. The Education Center highlights the history of the Tongvan people and their importance to the land, and is surrounded by native plant demonstration gardens.

=== Linden H. Chandler Preserve ===
The Linden H. Chandler Preserve is a 28.5-acre (115,000 m^{2}) property located in Rolling Hills Estates. Owned jointly by the City of Rolling Hills Estates and the Land Conservancy, intensive habitat restoration efforts have added native wildflowers and shrubs to the hillsides. Trails traverse its slopes and grasslands, passing by a recently restored wetland area. The Linden H. Chandler Preserve was created in 1993 through a sale and donation of property by the Chandler heirs, who wanted to see the land preserved in their father's name, who was the founder of Chandler's Palos Verdes Sand and Gravel in Rolling Hills Estates.

=== George F Canyon Preserve ===
The 51-acre (21 ha) George F Canyon Preserve and Nature Center is owned by the City of Rolling Hills Estates, and operated by the Conservancy. A nature trail passes through one of the largest canyons on the Palos Verdes Peninsula. Visitors walk or ride on horseback through willow-riparian and coastal sage scrub habitats, culminating in a view of the Los Angeles Basin.

The George F Canyon Nature Center provides educational and recreational programs. Exhibits focus on themes such as butterflies, birds of the canyon, insects, plant habitats, animals and wildflowers.

=== Palos Verdes Nature Preserve ===
Aerial view of preserved land on the coast

The Palos Verdes Nature Preserve is the largest of the Conservancy's preserves consisting of approximately 1,400 acres (5.7 km^{2}) of rolling hills, steep canyons and rock outcrops, with natural habitat and views of the Pacific Ocean and Santa Catalina Island. The City of Rancho Palos Verdes owns most of the land and the Palos Verdes Peninsula Land Conservancy manages the preserve. The preserve is made up of 12 reserves: Malaga Reserve, Vista Del Norte Reserve, Vicente Bluffs Reserve, Alta Vicente Reserve, Three Sisters Reserve, Filiorum Reserve, Portuguese Bend Reserve, Ocean Trails Reserve, Abalone Cove Ecological Reserve, Forrestal Reserve, San Ramon Reserve, and Agua Amarga Reserve.

Malaga Reserve

Malaga Canyon stretches the 61.5 acres of the Malaga Reserve. Running up the Grandview neighborhood of the Palos Verdes Estates, the reserve was acquired by the conservancy in 2019. The land now serves as habitat for the rare California gnatcatcher and is potential habitat for the Palos Verdes Blue Butterfly. The reserve is also part of the popular hiking circuit, the "PV Malaga Cove Loop" which is a 6.1 mile loop encompassing the Malaga Estates and Malaga Cove. Coastal sages, coastal cacti, and flowering blooms occupy the entirety of the land.

Vista Del Norte Reserve

Vista Del Norte Reserve is the smallest of the Palos Verdes Nature Preserves at only 14 acres (57,000 m^{2}). It is located above Indian Peak Drive on the slopes of the Rolling Hills Estates. It overlooks the Peninsula's center area from Vista del Norte and Indian Peak Loop Trails. Hiking trails are open to pedestrians only and offer views of the LA Basin and the Catalina Islands on a clear day.

Vicente Bluffs Reserve

This reserve occupies the bluffs located off the coast of the eastern edge of Rancho Palos Verdes. It encompasses 84 acres of accessible land: 6 acres of the bluffs at the lower point of the reserve, 9 acres of fishing access property, and the areas of natural habitat within the Estates at 69 acres. This particular reserve is known for its unique geological formations, such as the hexagonal-shaped rock columns of basalt. The California Coastal Conservancy grant, along with the Conservancy help protect these formations from sedimentation and increased erosion from hiking and other recreational activities.

The three parts of the reserve are separated by chunks of private land, so there is no singular trail that runs through the entirety of the reserve. Because the bluffs and the rock formations are protected by the Conservancy, trails running through this section are designated for pedestrian use only, and the land located more inland have multi-use purposes.

Alta Vicente Reserve

Like Vicente Bluffs Reserve, Alta Vicente Reserve is located along the eastern shore of Rancho Palos Verdes, and encompasses a coastal section and a more inland section. A mass restoration plan was initiated in 2008 to restore the 55 acre reserve, and efforts are still being made today to accomplish this goal. There are several trails, whose purpose is multi-use, that occupy the inland section, and due to increased protection of the coast, the coastal section is designated for pedestrian hiking only.

In 1942, at the beginning of World War II, the land that now stands at this reserve was utilized by the US in its efforts to protect the western shore from enemy advancement tactics. Two 6-inch diameter coastal artillery guns were constructed to protect the Catalina channel from invasion, and several bunkers were dug out to house soldiers, ammunition, and supplies.

Three Sisters Reserve

Three Sisters Reserve connects to the western edge of Filiorum Reserve, and is a 99 acre piece of protected land that can be accessed directly from Fillorum Reserve or through the Rolling Hills Estates. A 21 acre restoration project was initiated in 2009 to help restore native wildflower habitat and coastal habitat.

The innovative technique used in this project was the monitoring of 250 goats, which were moved into the reserve to eat all of the non-native plants and species of weeds that had taken over the ecosystem when the preserve was originally established. The Conservancy is also responsible for the irrigation and planting of over 8,000 grass and sage scrub species. Because of these efforts, the reserve can support rare bird species and multi-use trails.

Filiorum Reserve

This reserve is situated between Three Sisters Reserve and Portuguese Bend Reserves, and can be accessed from either of the two reserves or through residential street access. This 191 acres of land was acquired by Rancho Palos Verdes in December 2009, and later designated to the Conservancy. The acquisition of this land became a team effort, as the City and Conservancy brought forward 6.5 million in capital, and over 700 local donors raised the other portion of the fund in order to purchase this land for the City and the local population.

Portuguese Bend Reserve

Portuguese Bend Reserve is the largest individual reserve within the Palos Verdes Nature Preserve at 399 acres. It situated in between Filiorum Reserve and Forrestal Reserve, and was preserved by the Conservancy in 2005. The reserve consists of Rolling Hills, five distinct canyons and rock outcrops, and an ecosystem of incredibly drought-resistant flowering shrubs and coastal sagebrush.

In August 2009, a California wildfire burned through 165 acres of the reserve, affecting the flora and fauna species within the land, including the endangered California Gnatcatcher. Because of this, restoring this reserve became a primary goal for the Conservancy, and planting and restoration projects continue to this day.

Portuguese Bend has a long history of recorded landslides, with its latest movement episode beginning in 1956 from a road construction project. By 1969, the stretch of land had lost about 54,500,000 metric tons of debris to landslide, and the site has been continuing to erode to this day. As a result, some portions of the trails or reserve will be flagged by cones or caution tape, and some sections are off-limits to everybody in general.

Ocean Trails Reserve

Located directly below San Ramon Reserve, and stretching along the coast, parallel to Trump National Golf Club, Los Angeles, lies the 119 acre Ocean Trails Reserve. The reserve has a recorded 8 miles of pedestrian trails, including several beach access points. Over 250,000 native plants have been restored throughout the reserve, including several species of coastal scrub, cacti, and grasses. The area provides a hotspot for migrating birds flying both North and South depending on the time of year, and the habitat supports local species like the California gnatcatcher and the cactus wren.

Abalone Cove Ecological Reserve

Abalone Cove Ecological Reserve is a 64 acre preserve that also contains a State Ecological Preserve. It is separated into two beaches, Abalone Cove and Sacred Cove, and features tide pools, bluffs, and black sand. Accessible along Palos Verdes Drive South, the reserve maintains coastal marine species as well as the terrestrial native species, therefore fishing or taking of marine species is strictly prohibited. Several trails run throughout the reserve, whether you want to make it down to the beaches and tidepools, or if you want to enjoy the scenery from along the cliffs. Currently, some parts of the reserve are closed off to the public due to landslides and unstable cliffs above the site. The area will remain closed until these issues is resolved.

From an ecology perspective, the word take generally means to harass, harm, pursue, hunt, shoot, wound, kill, trap, capture, or collect, or to attempt to engage in any such conduct with a species, as mentioned in the Endangered Species Act.

Forrestal Reserve

Connecting to the Southeastern end of the Portuguese Bend Reserve is the 155 acres of Forrestal Reserve. This reserve has played a prominent role in the Conservancy's efforts to restoring the land. In 2001, restoration began with the help of local community volunteers, so today the reserve can be considered as the best remaining area for wildlife habitat and hiking trails. within the entirety of the Palos Verdes Nature Preserve.

According to the site's geologic history, Rancho Palos Verdes was once an island, and the LA Basin was submerged underwater. Once tectonic uplift took place, the crust, once submerged, began to form cliffs above sea level, and the material within the crust rose along with it. This being said, the reserve's main unique features include the presence of a quarry, dramatic cliffs characterized by faults and folds, and crystals and fossils buried within the sedimentary bedding and igneous intrusions. The discovered fossil remnants can be found at the Point Vicente Interpretive Center.

San Ramon Reserve

The San Ramon Reserve is situated directly above the eastern portion of the Ocean Trails Reserve. Formerly known as the "Switchbacks", it includes all of the 95-acre parcels that surround the switchbacks of Palos Verdes Drive East. The preserve provides oceanside views of the harbor and Catalina Island.

==== Agua Amarga Reserve ====
The Agua Amarga Reserve is a 59-acre reserve that features two canyons, the Agua Amarga and the Lunada, which conjoin on the western end of the reserve. The site is on the border of residential Palos Verdes Estates and can be seen below Hawthorne Boulevard. The Agua Amarga Canyon was acquired in 2005, but land rights to the Lunada Canyon were given to the Conservancy by the E.K Zuckerman family in 1992, which became the Land Conservancy's first natural area.

Once a site for residential development, the Conservancy has restored three acres of coastal sage scrub and willow wetlands habitat for native species such as the California gnatcatcher. Lunada Canyon is a popular hiking destination with scenic views of the ocean from within the gully of the canyon. A hike through Lunada is 1.5 miles round trip, excluding the 0.2 miles of overgrown vegetation at the top of the trail where the views are blocked by nearby houses.

=== Navy Defense Fuel Supply Point ===
The rare Palos Verdes Blue Butterfly

The Defense Fuel Supply Point in San Pedro provides storage for military fuel reserves and is also home to the endangered Palos Verdes blue butterfly (Glaucopsyche lygdamus palosverdesensis), the “rarest butterfly on earth”. The DFSP mission is a restricted facility which receives, stores, and distributes diesel and jet fuels for military use in California, Arizona and Nevada. Coastal sage scrub is juxtaposed within pipelines and storage tanks, providing habitat for the Palos Verdes blue butterfly as well as the threatened California gnatcatcher (Polioptila californica), a small gray bird that is listed as threatened by the U.S. Fish and Wildlife Service.

== Science and education ==
The Conservancy works to save the landscape from past degradation from urbanization, agriculture uses, and the introduction of invasive foreign species. The goals of the Conservancy's science program are to increase the scientific knowledge base of the Palos Verdes Peninsula through collaborative research. The scientific program focuses on understanding the basic ecosystem functions that define the Palos Verdes Peninsula. Research is conducted both by Conservancy staff and through partnerships with universities, colleges and local agencies.

Research projects inform restoration, conservation, education, and stewardship programs and address the interface between the natural and urban environments. The Conservancy's research program was developed to involve collaborative researchers with the overall goal of increasing the scientific knowledge of the Palos Verdes Peninsula.

Today, the Conservancy implores several educational opportunities for the community to join in on. A team of environmental educators lead monthly nature walks for those interested in learning about the history of the land and how to properly maintain the natural environment. They also host several events throughout the year for families, and they are always open to bookings for school trips and other program visits. The Conservancy has two nature centers where everyone is able to learn about the land and participate in an array of activities to inspire connection to nature, George F. Canyon Nature Preserve and White Point Nature Education Center.

== See also ==
- South Coast Botanic Garden
- Palos Verdes Peninsula topics
- Natural history of Los Angeles County, California
- Natural history of the California chaparral and woodlands
