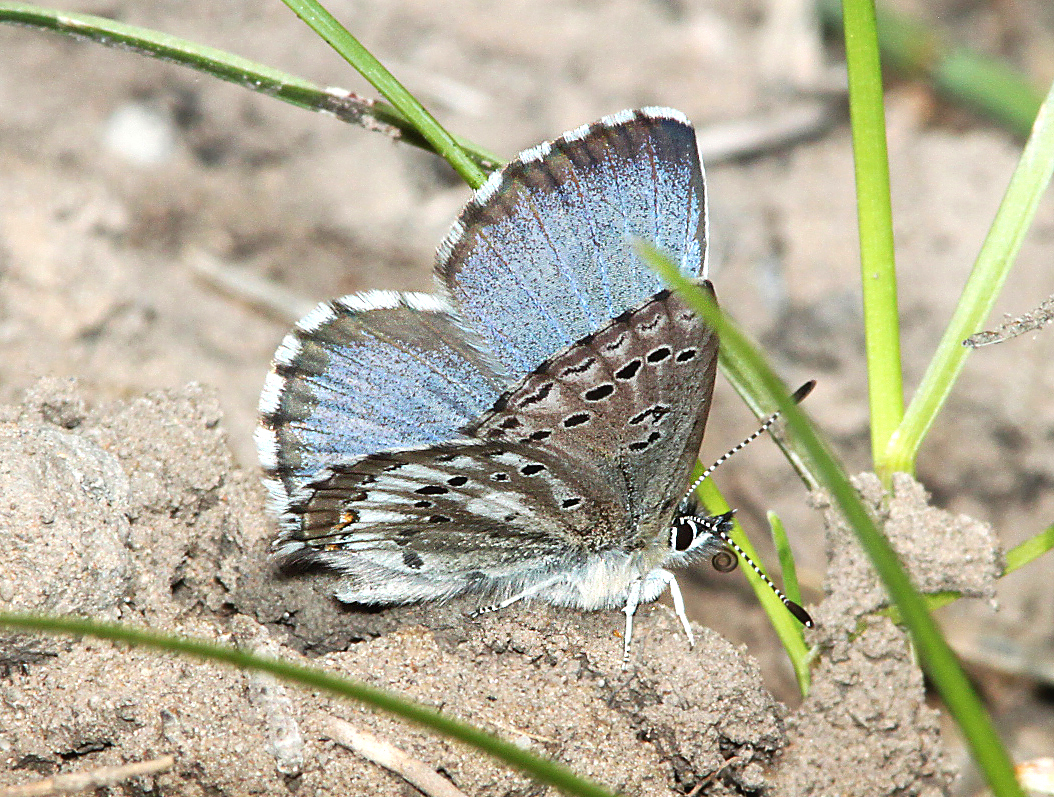
- Imago in Wayne Co, central Utah

Conservation status
- Apparently Secure (NatureServe)

Scientific classification
- Domain: Eukaryota
- Kingdom: Animalia
- Phylum: Arthropoda
- Class: Insecta
- Order: Lepidoptera
- Family: Lycaenidae
- Genus: Glaucopsyche
- Subgenus: Glaucopsyche (Glaucopsyche)
- Species: G. piasus

Binomial name
- Glaucopsyche piasus Boisduval, 1852

Synonyms
- Lycaena catalina Reakirt, 1866

= Glaucopsyche piasus =

Species of butterfly

Glaucopsyche piasus, the arrowhead blue, is a western North American butterfly of the family Lycaenidae. It is a locally common butterfly that favors prairie, open woodland, and woodland edges and trails.

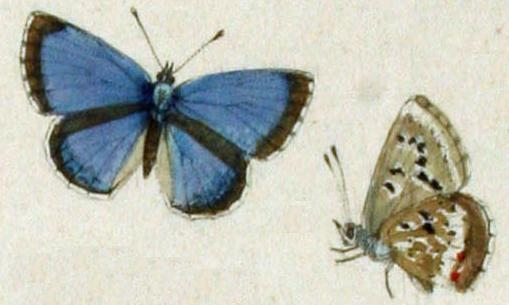
In Felder, 1864

== Description ==
This species has checkered fringes. The upper side of males are violet blue with a wide border; females are duller. The underside is gray with many small black spots. The hindwing has a post-median band of white arrowheads pointing inwards. The wingspan is between 1 1/8 and 1 3/8 inches (2.9 and 3.5 cm). The males patrol during the day near host plants, while females lay eggs on flower buds of the host plant. There is one brood from March to July. Larvae feed on lupine (Lupinus) and milkvetch (Astragalus) species. The adults feed on flower nectar.
