= Archipiélago de Juan Fernández National Park =

National park of Chile

Coordinates: 33.7297°S 79.8692°W

- IUCN category II (national park)
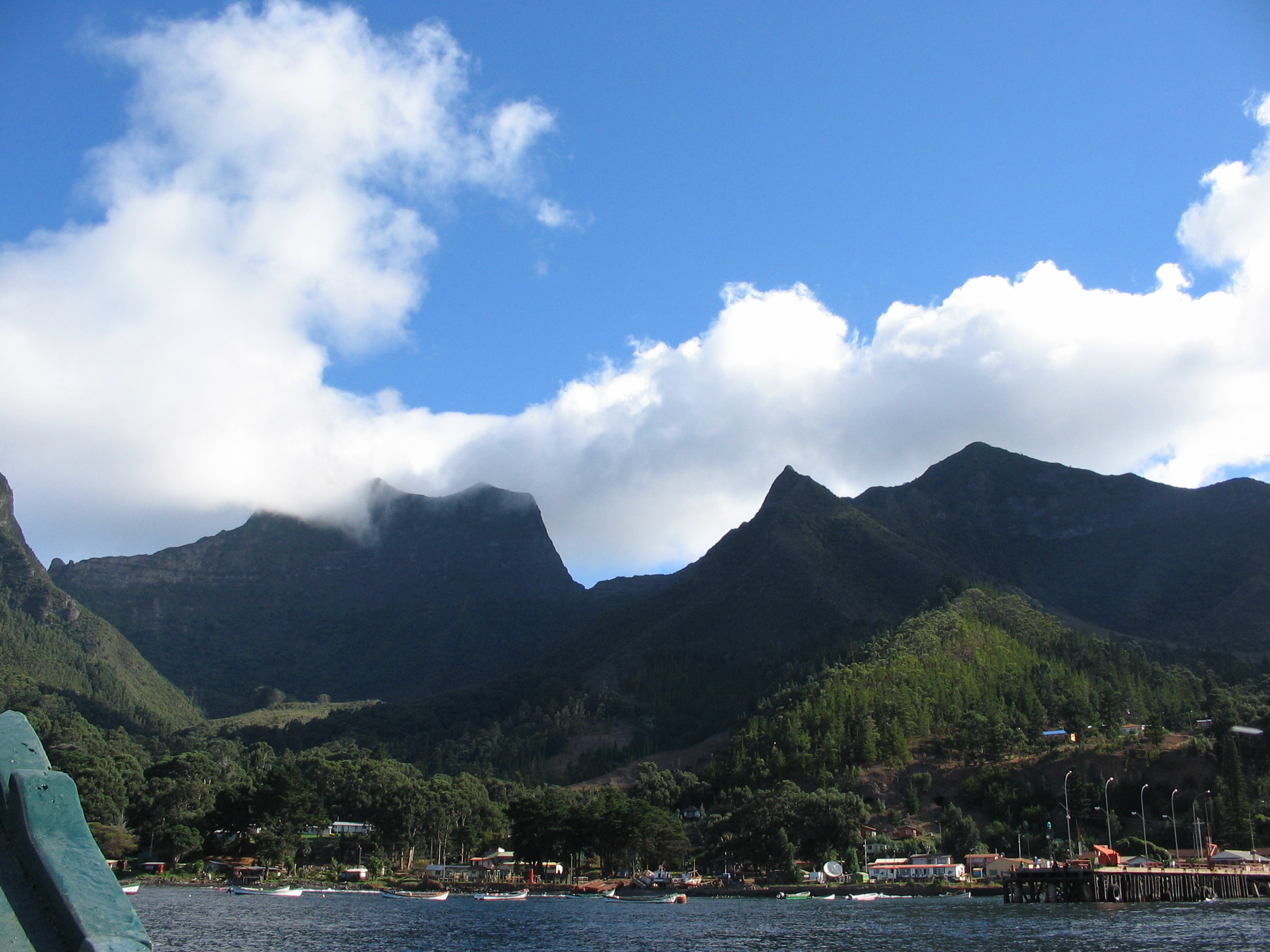
- Robinson Crusoe Island

- Location within Chile
- Location: Valparaíso Region, Chile
- Nearest city: San Antonio, Chile
- Area: 96 km^{2} (37 sq mi)
- Established: January 16, 1935
- Visitors: 1,416 (in 2012)
- Governing body: CONAF

Archipiélago de Juan Fernández National Park (Spanish pronunciation: [ˈxwaɱ feɾˈnandes]) is a national park located in the Pacific Ocean 665 kilometres west of Chile's mainland port of San Antonio, in the Juan Fernández Archipelago. The park covers 96 square kilometres and comprises the islands of Santa Clara andAlejandro Selkirk, as well as most of Robinson Crusoe Island.

== Climate ==
The islands have a subtropical climate with mediterranean influence, but this varies depending on the island and is moderated by the influence of the cold Humboldt Current, which flows northward to the east of the islands, and the southeast trade winds. Temperatures range from 3 °C (37 °F) to 34 °C (93 °F), with an annual mean of 15.4 °C (60 °F). Higher elevations are generally cooler, with occasional frosts on Robinson Crusoe.

Average annual precipitation is 1,081 mm (42.6 in), varying from 318 mm (12.5 in) to 1,698 mm (66.9 in) year to year. Much of the variability in rainfall depends on the El Niño-Southern Oscillation. There is generally a 4 - 5 month dry season during the warmer summer months. Rainfall is higher in the winter months, and varies with elevation and exposure; elevations above 500 m (1,640 ft) experience frequent rainfall, while the western, leeward sides of Robinson Crusoe and Santa Clara are quite dry.

== Ecosystem of the park ==
The Juan Fernández islands are home to rare and endemic plants and animals, some of which are at risk of extinction (like the Juan Fernández Hummingbird). The islands are recognized as a distinct ecoregion, and the whole archipelago, including Robinson Crusoe, Alexander Selkirk and Santa Clara islands and all the islets in the area of the national park, were designated a Biosphere Reserve by UNESCO in 1977.

The volcanic origin and remote location of the islands isolate them from the flora and fauna species of continental South America. As a result, the island is home to relatively few plant and animal species. The closest relatives of the archipelago's plants and animals are found in the temperate broadleaf and mixed forest ecoregions of Southern Chile, including the Valdivian temperate rain forests, Magellanic subpolar forests, and Desventuradas Islands.

=== Flora ===
There are 209 native species of vascular plants in the park, approximately 150 of which are flowering plants and 50 are ferns. There are 126 species (62 percent) that are endemic, with 12 endemic genera and one endemic family, Lactoridaceae. Many plants are characteristic of the Antarctic flora, and are related to plants found in southern South America, New Zealand and Australia. Vegetation zones generally correspond to elevation, with grasslands and shrublands at lower elevations, tall and montane forests at middle elevations, and shrublands at the highest elevations. The two main islands have somewhat distinct plant communities.

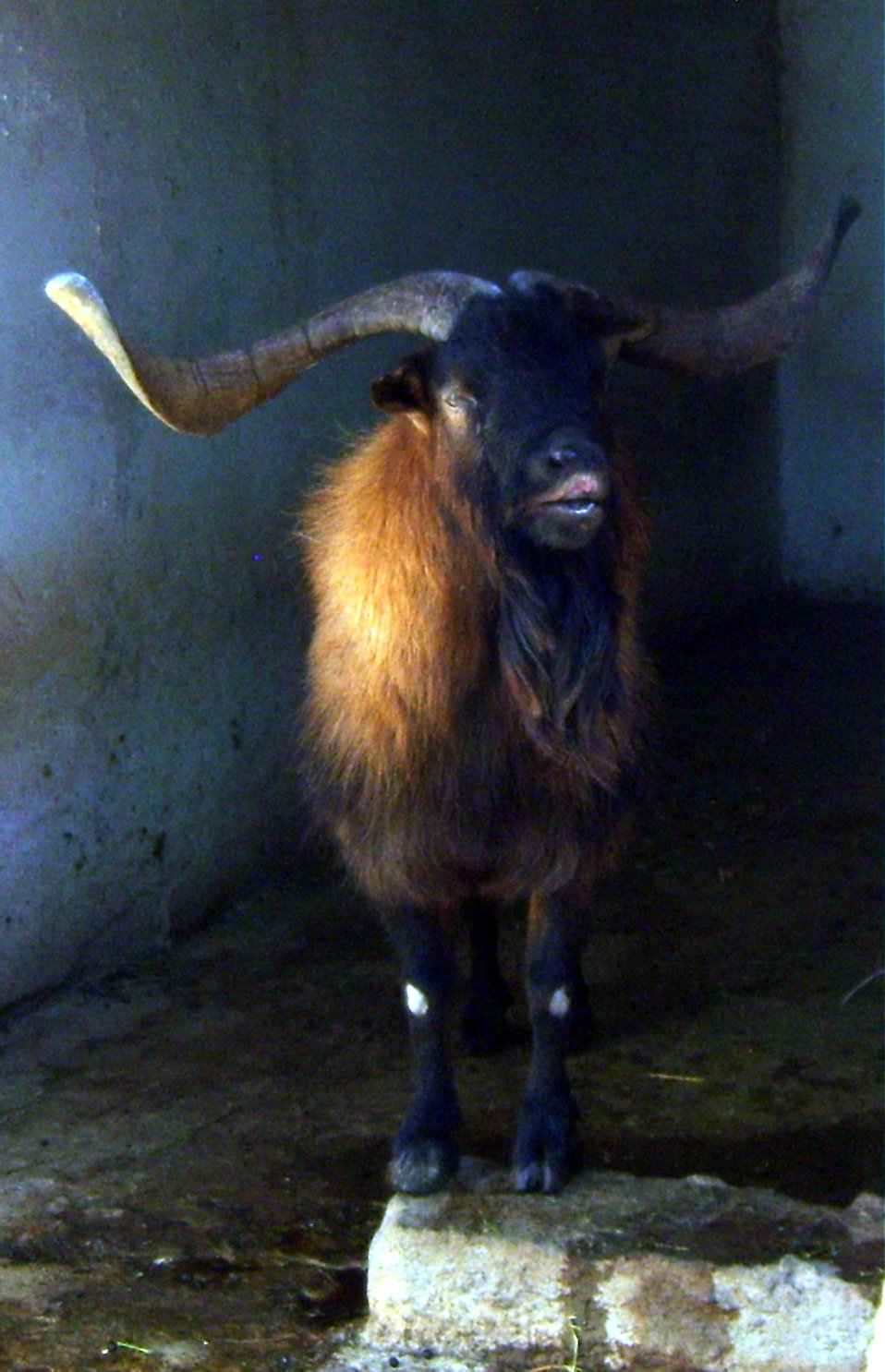
Juan Fernández Goat, (originally domestic goats) showing many of the characteristic of wild goats

Alejandro Selkirk Island is mostly covered with grassland from 0 to 400 m (1,300 ft), interspersed with wooded ravines (quebradas), home to dry forests of Myrceugenia and Zanthoxylum fagara. From 400 m (1,300 ft) to 600 m (2,000 ft) are lower montane forests, with upper montane forest from 600 m (2,000 ft) to 950 m (3,100 ft). The treeline is at approximately 950 m (3,100 ft), above which is alpine shrubland and grassland, dominated by temperate Magellanic vegetation such as Acaena, Dicksonia, Drimys, Empetrum, Gunnera, Myrteola, Pernettya, and Ugni. On Robinson Crusoe, grasslands predominate from 0 to 100 m (300 ft); introduced shrubs from 100 m (300 ft) to 300 m (1,000 ft); tall forests from 300 m (1,000 ft) to 500 m (1,600 ft); montane forests from 500 m (1,640 ft) to 700 m (2,300 ft), with dense tree cover of Cuminia fernandezia, Fagara, and Rhaphithamnus venustus; tree fern forests from 700 m (2,300 ft) to 750 m (2,500 ft), and brushwood forests above 750 m (2,500 ft). Santa Clara is covered with grassland.

One of the main predators of endemic vegetable species, and responsible for the great extensions of grassland, is the Juan Fernández Goat. These were originally domestic goats left behind by the first explorers which became feral, recovering some of the characteristics of wild goats (Capra aegagrus). CONAF carries out ongoing work to control this and other invasive species, including mice, rats, true thrushes, sparrow and feral cats.

Three endemic species dominate the montane forests of the archipelago: Drimys confertifolia on both main islands; Nothomyrcia fernandeziana on Robinson Crusoe; and Myrceugenia schulzei on Alexander Selkirk. Endemic tree fern species of southern hemisphere genus Dicksonia (D. berteriana on Robinson Crusoe and D. externa on Alexander Selkirk) and the endemic genus Thyrsopteris (T. elegans) are the predominant species in the tree-fern forests. An endemic species of sandalwood, Santalum fernandezianum, was overexploited for its fragrant wood, has not been seen since 1908, and is believed extinct. The Chonta palm (Juania australis) is endangered.

=== Fauna ===
The Juan Fernández Archipelago has a very limited fauna, with no native land mammals, reptiles, or amphibians. Seventeen land and sea-bird species breed on the islands. The island has three endemic bird species, and two endemic subspecies. Introduced fauna by humans include rats and goats. Robinson Crusoe Island is home to an endemic and endangered hummingbird, the Juan Fernández firecrown (Sephanoides fernandensis). This large hummingbird, about 11 cm (4 in) long, is thought to number only about 500 individuals. The other endemic bird species are the Juan Fernández tit-tyrant (Anairetes fernandezianus) of Robinson Crusoe Island, and the Masafuera rayadito (Aphrastura masafuerae) of Alejandro Selkirk Island. The islands support the entire known breeding populations of two petrel species, Stejneger's Petrel Pterodroma longirostris (IUCN status VU) and the Juan Fernandez Petrel Pterodroma externa (IUCN status VU). In addition, the Juan Fernandez Islands may still support a third breeding petrel species, De Filippi's Petrel Pterodroma defilippiana (IUCN status VU), whose only other known breeding grounds are on the Desventuradas Islands.

The Magellanic penguin breeds on Robinson Crusoe Island within the archipelago. The endemic Juan Fernandez spiny lobster (without claws) lives in the marine waters (Jasus frontalis). The Juan Fernández fur seal (Arctocephalus philippii) also lives on the islands. This species was nearly exterminated in the sixteenth to nineteenth century, but it was rediscovered in 1965. A census in 1970 found about 750 fur seals living there. Today, the total population reaches the ten thousands. Only two were sighted on the Desventuradas Islands, located some 780 km (485 mi) to the north. The actual population of the Desventuradas may be higher, because the species tends to hide in sea caves. There seems to be a yearly population increase of 16–17 percent.

Juan Fernandez fauna and sea life

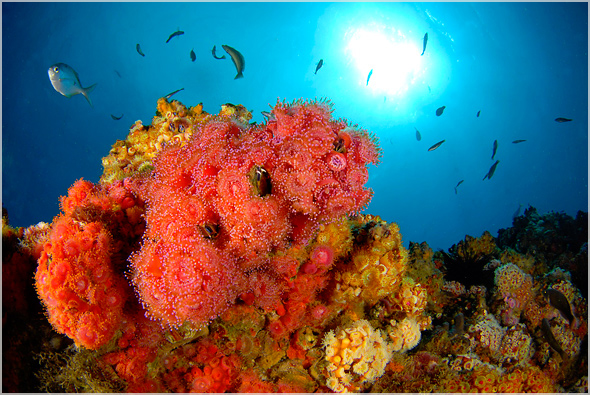
Juan Fernández Reef

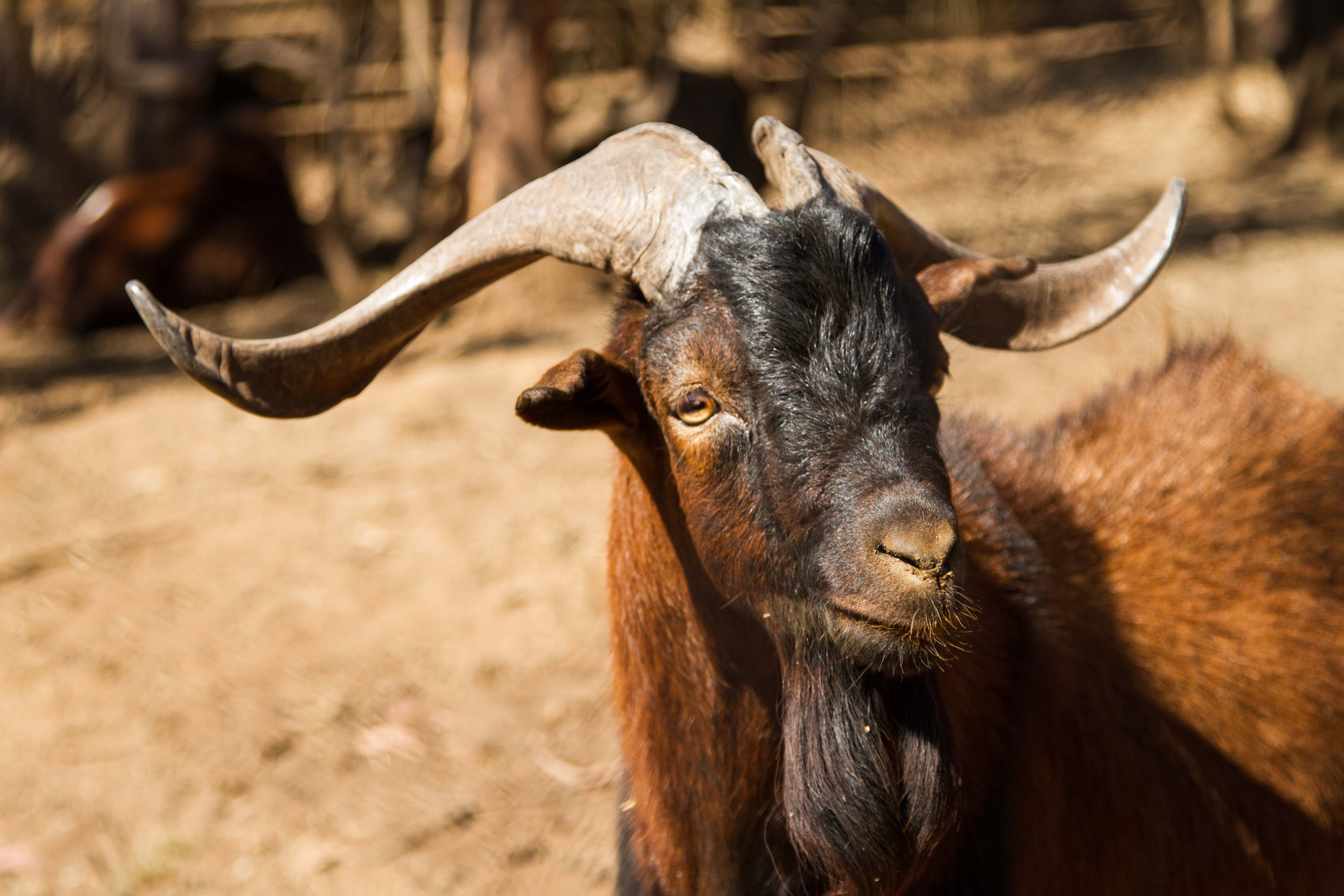
Juan Fernández Wild Goat

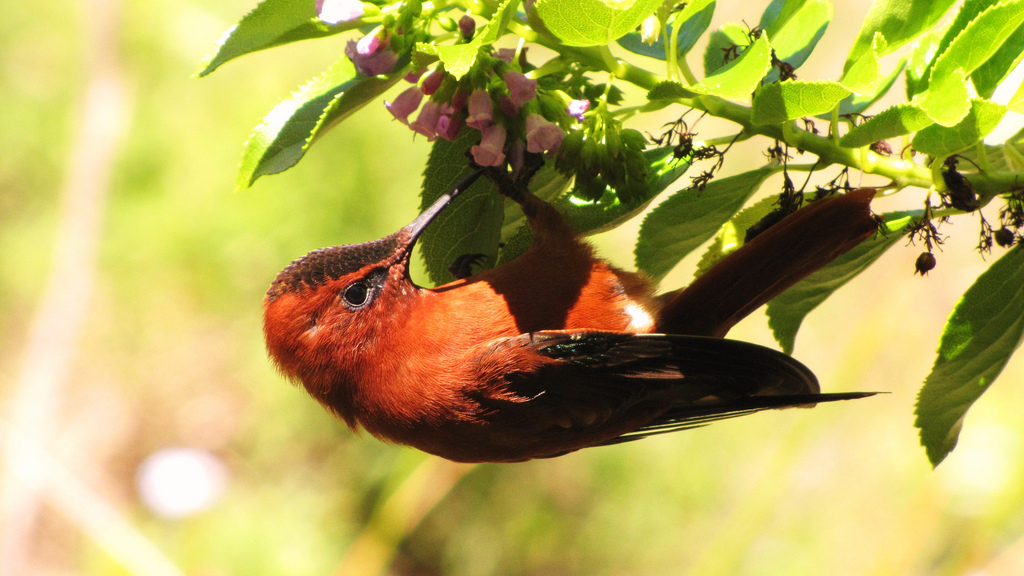
Juan Fernández Firecrown

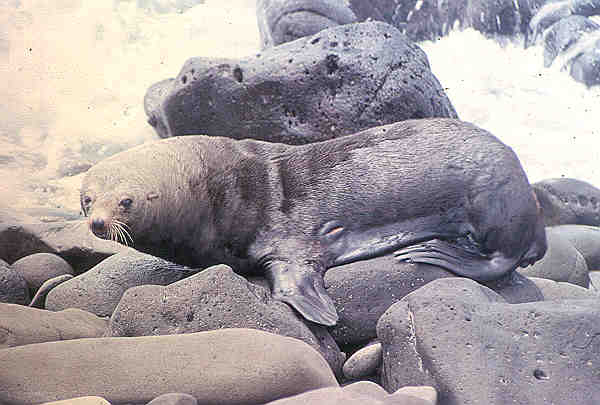
Juan Fernández Fur Seal

== How to get to the park ==
From the continent, as expected, the access is only by air or sea. By air: the local airlines LASSA and ATA fly weekly (2.5 hrs. from Santiago). By sea: a Chilean Navy ship goes to the islands in December and February, and only occasionally the rest of the year. The journey takes one and a half days from Valparaíso.
