= Will (Indian) =

17th-century Miskito pirate

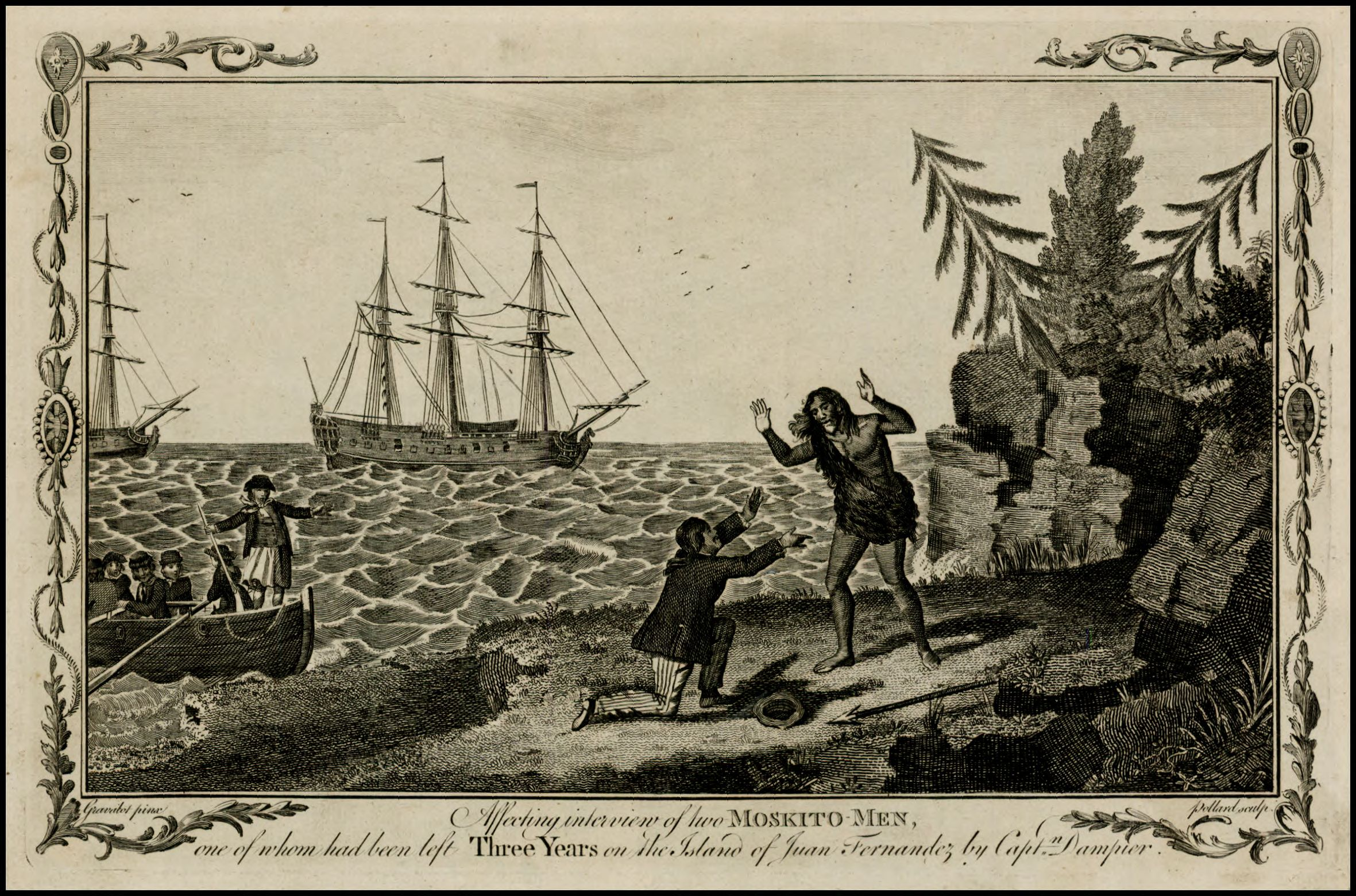
Miskito man, Will, reunited with fellow Miskito, Robin, on Juan Fernández Island in 1684 after surviving alone for over three years using ingenuity and resourcefulness, as recounted by Captain Dampier.

Will (probably born in the 1650s or 1660s) was a Miskito pirate from Mosquitia. He was left behind on the uninhabited Robinson Crusoe Island (today part of Insular Chile), surviving there alone for more than three years. It is possible that Will became the inspiration for Man Friday, the cannibal character in Daniel Defoe's novel Robinson Crusoe.

== In English service ==
As with other Miskitos, Will resisted the Spanish encroachment on their lands, and consequently allied with English pirates operating in the region. In 1680, he and several other Misquitos went on board an English vessel under the command of John Watling. The English gave names to the Miskitos, and he ended up with the name Will. At the end of that year, the English decided to refresh their supplies on the largest of the uninhabited Juan Fernández Islands. On 1 January 1681, while Will was hunting for goats in the island's interior, his comrades suddenly departed without him after having seen Spanish ships approaching in the horizon.

== Castaway life ==
According to William Dampier's book A New Voyage Round the World, Will started his life with

"his Gun and a Knife, with a small Horn of Powder, and a few Shot; which being spent, he contrived a way by notching his Knife, to saw the Barrel of his Gun into small Pieces, wherewith he made Harpoons, Lances, Hooks and a long Knife; heating the pieces first in the fire, which he struck with his Gunflint, and a piece of the Barrel of his Gun, which he hardened; having learnt to do that among the English."

In the beginning Will killed and ate seals but later he only killed seals "but to make [fishing] Lines, cutting their Skins into Thongs."

According to the account of William Dampier, the only first-hand source of information on Will, Will was seen by Spanish landing parties a number of times, but was never captured. Will was rescued by an English party under the command of Dampier on 22 March 1684, and he is recorded to have, upon being reached by the rescuers, immediately killed three goats and served them up in the English style, with cabbage.

== Connections to Robinson Crusoe ==
One of the first writers to connect the story of Will in Dampier to Robinson Crusoe was Thomas Roscoe, in his 1831 annotated edition of Defoe's text.
