= San Juan Bautista, Chile =

San Juan Bautista
- Town
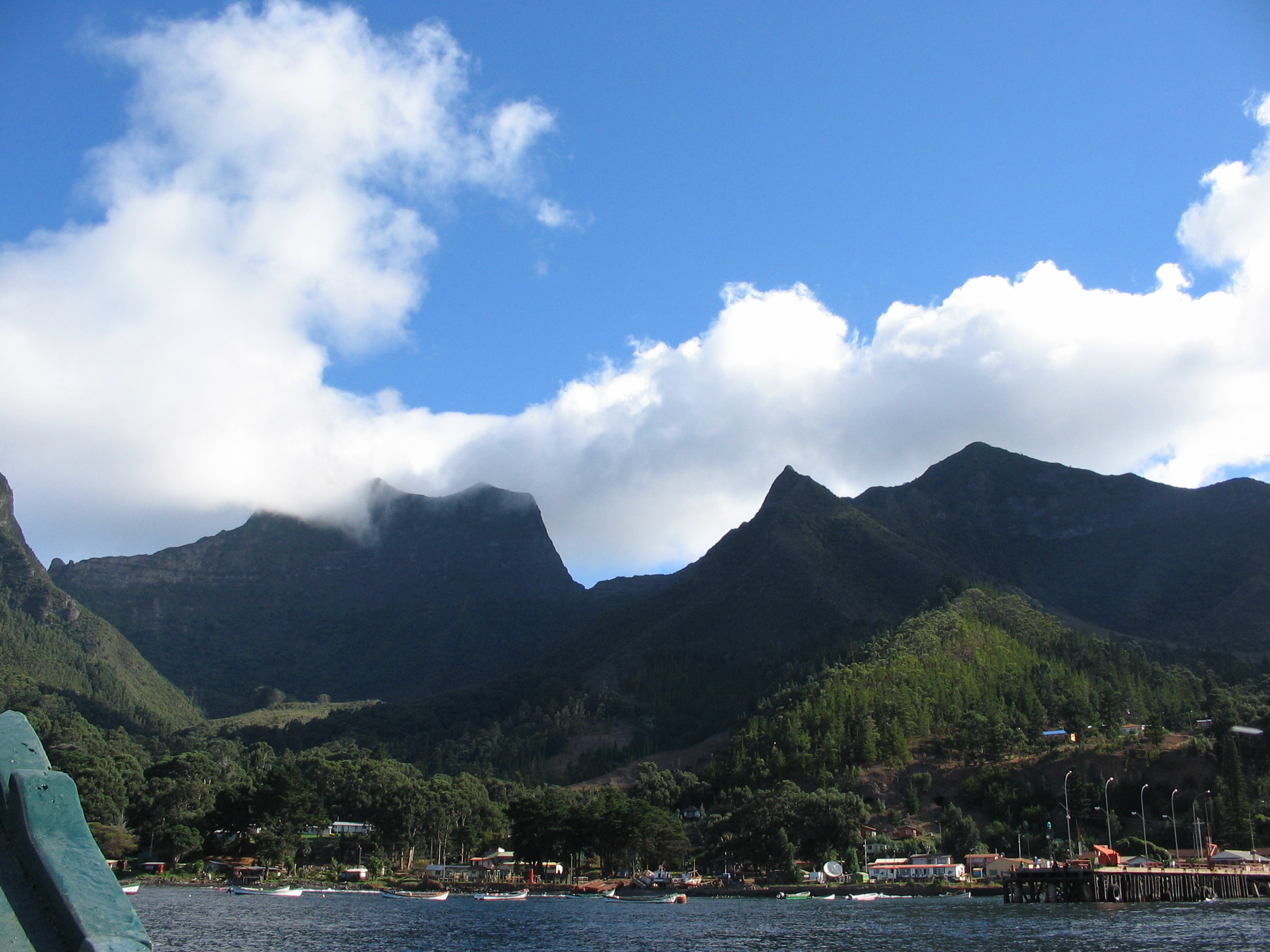
- San Juan Bautista, looking south, as viewed from Cumberland Bay (04/2005).

- Location within Chile
- Coordinates: 33°38′S 78°50′W
- Country: Chile
- Region: Valparaíso
- Province: Valparaíso
- Commune: Juan Fernández
- Founded: 1877

Government
  - Type: Municipality
- Elevation: 0 m (0 ft)

Population (2012 census)
  - Total: 800
- Time zone: UTC-4 (Chilean Standard)
  - Summer (DST): UTC-3 (Chilean Daylight)
- Area code: 56 + 9
- Climate: Cfa

San Juan Bautista is the main town on Robinson Crusoe Island, part of the Juan Fernández Islands, Juan Fernández commune, Valparaíso Province, Chile, and is the primary human settlement within the island chain. Some sources say the town was founded in 1877, while others give an earlier date of 1750. It is located at Cumberland Bay, on the central northeastern coast. Ship Logs from American whalers report transporting prospective colonists and their baggage to the Island on June 19th, 1844.

Although the community maintains a "rustic" serenity, and is largely dependent on the spiny lobster trade, residents do use vehicles, maintain a satellite internet connection, and own television sets. At the 2012 census, the town had a population of 800 people, living in an area of 0.31 km^{2} (0.12 mi^{2}).

There is a football pitch at the north end of the village, near the Dresden School—named after the German light cruiser SMS Dresden, sunk there during World War I; the street it is located on bears the name Dresden, as well. The names of other (generally unpaved) streets in the village include Larraín Alcalde, Ignacio Carrera Pinto, El Sándalo, Vicente González, Teniente Cortés, and La Pólvora.

Overlooking San Juan Bautista are Las Cuevas de los Patriotas (the patriots' caves), where 42 Chilean creole independence activists lived in-exile, as ordered by the Spanish authorities, after the Battle of Rancagua (October 1814). The exiles included historical icons such as Juan Egaña and Manuel de Salas.

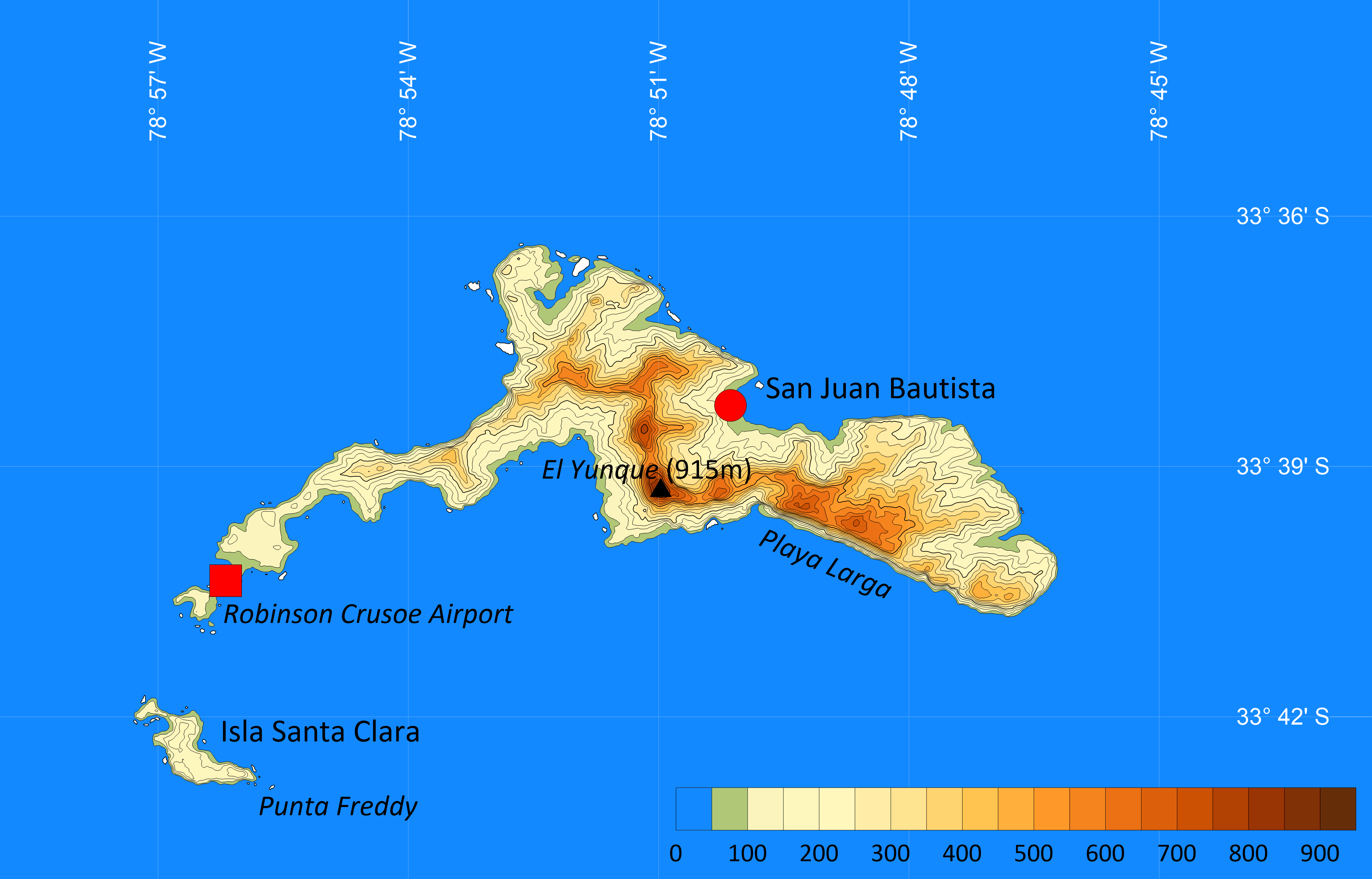
Mapa de la isla de San Juan Bautista

== Transportation ==
Since early 2010, a pair of ships, operated by the Chilean Navy, arrives each month from the mainland. The number of passengers is limited, so arrangements must be made a month or more in advance; reservations are first-come, first-serve until capacity is reached, with preference going to the locals. A one-way trip by boat takes approximately 2–4 days, or around 48–96 hours, depending on maritime conditions.

There is a small, 885 m (2,904 ft) airstrip, Robinson Crusoe Airfield, at the southwest of the island, the only reasonably flat part of the landmass. The airfield typically can only accommodate smaller, twin-engine craft with no more than around seven passengers (and with very light luggage). The average flight-time from the mainland is about 2.5 hours, followed by a roughly 90-minute ferry ride to the town proper, located at the opposite end of the island.

== Climate ==
San Juan Bautista has a subtropical with mediterranean influence climate (Köppen Cfa), with rainfall intermediate between that of Valparaíso and Concepción. Temperature is influenced by the cold Humboldt Current, which flows northward to the east of Robinson Crusoe Island, and the southeast. A city with similar climatic parameters to San Juan Bautista is Vila do Corvo in the Azores islands.

Climate data for San Juan Bautista, Chile (1981–2010, extremes 1958–present)
Month	Jan	Feb	Mar	Apr	May	Jun	Jul	Aug	Sep	Oct	Nov	Dec	Year
Mean daily maximum °C (°F)	25.2 (77.4)	23.1 (73.6)	21.1 (70.0)	19.3 (66.7)	17.6 (63.7)	16.2 (61.2)	15.0 (59.0)	14.8 (58.6)	16.0 (60.8)	17.0 (62.6)	19.6 (67.3)	22.8 (73.0)	18.5 (65.3)
Daily mean °C (°F)	22.1 (71.8)	20.3 (68.5)	18.1 (64.6)	16.5 (61.7)	15.0 (59.0)	13.6 (56.5)	12.5 (54.5)	12.2 (54.0)	13.3 (55.9)	15.3 (59.5)	17.1 (62.8)	20.2 (68.4)	15.7 (60.3)
Mean daily minimum °C (°F)	19.1 (66.4)	17.6 (63.7)	16.1 (61.0)	14.6 (58.3)	13.1 (55.6)	11.8 (53.2)	10.8 (51.4)	10.4 (50.7)	10.4 (50.7)	11.3 (52.3)	14.7 (58.5)	17.7 (63.9)	13.6 (56.5)
Average precipitation mm (inches)	42.5 (1.67)	44.5 (1.75)	60.3 (2.37)	91.1 (3.59)	160.8 (6.33)	180.1 (7.09)	160.2 (6.31)	126.3 (4.97)	87.7 (3.45)	54.1 (2.13)	45.1 (1.78)	40.1 (1.58)	1,092.8 (43.02)
Average precipitation days (≥ 0.1 mm)	11	10	13	15	21	23	21	19	16	14	10	10	183
Average relative humidity (%)	73	73	73	77	78	78	79	77	77	76	74	73	76
Mean monthly sunshine hours	248.0	209.1	158.1	123.0	108.5	99.0	93.0	105.4	147.0	204.6	249.0	260.4	2,005.1
Source: Dirección Meteorológica de Chile "Logbook of the Ship American of Nantucket", by Henry Gifford, Falmouth, MA, USA. 1841-1844.

== 2010 tsunami ==
On 27 February 2010, at least eight people lost their lives when a tsunami caused by the Chilean 8.8 earthquake hit the island and inundated the town. Most of the buildings in the community were destroyed. The disaster could have been worse if not for a timely warning from a 12-year-old girl named Martina Maturana, which saved many of her neighbors from harm.

== Attribution ==
- The original version of this article included text from the Wikipedia article Robinson Crusoe Island.
