= Francisco Javier Quevado y Vasquez =

Chilean educator

Francisco Javier Quevado y Vasquez (1857–?) was a Chilean educator.

He was born in Santiago in 1857. His parents were Juan Quevedo and Carlota Vasquez. He was educated at the Escuela Normal de Preceptores in 1874. Given the title of state professor (profesor de Estado), he was named director of a Quillota public school in 1875. A short time later was director of the city's Superior School (Escuela Superior). In 1877, he was awarded a provincial first prize among teachers of public schools in Valparaíso Province. That year, he also founded the Quillota Society of Elementary Instruction (Sociedad de Instruccion Primaria de Quillota). He also organized and conducted night school for adult workers in that city. In 1888, he was the editor of the Quillota newspaper El Correo. In 1892 he won the position of principal in the school Blas Cuevas de Valparaiso. In 1893 he was appointed general director of primary education in the army. In this capacity he organized the field of primary education in the military. In 1889 he was part of Pedagogy Conference, organized for the first time in Chile.
