= Insular Region =

Insular Region may refer to the following places:

- Insular Chile, a group of oceanic islands under the sovereignty of Chile
- Insular Italy, an official statistical region of Italy
- Insular region of Colombia, the oceanic islands outside the continental territory
- Insular Region (Equatorial Guinea)
- Insular Region, Venezuela

== See also ==
- Insular area, a US-associated jurisdiction that is not part of a US state
- Insular cortex of the brain
- Insular Southeast Asia
- Mainland
- Peninsula
