= Aerocardal =

Chilean airline

AeroCardal
IATA	ICAO	Call sign
-	CDA	AEROCARDAL
- Founded: 1991
- Hubs: Arturo Merino Benítez International Airport
- Alliance: Air Elite, Cirrus Aircraft, JSSI, Gulfstream
- Fleet size: 11
- Headquarters: Santiago, Chile
- Website: https://www.aerocardal.com/en/

Aerocardal is an airline based in Santiago, Chile. It operates international and domestic passenger charter services as well as medical services. Its main base is Arturo Merino Benítez International Airport, Santiago.

== History ==
Aerocardal was established in 1989. It operates a fleet of 11 aircraft including jets and turboprops as well as twin-turbine helicopters. The airline offers flights connecting major capitals as well as medium-sized or remote cities in the Americas and Europe.

== Destinations ==
Aerocardal serves the following scheduled destinations within Chile:

- Santiago - Arturo Merino Benítez International Airport - hub
- Robinson Crusoe Island - Robinson Crusoe Airport - stational

Additionally, the airline operates charter flights and air ambulances.

== Fleet ==
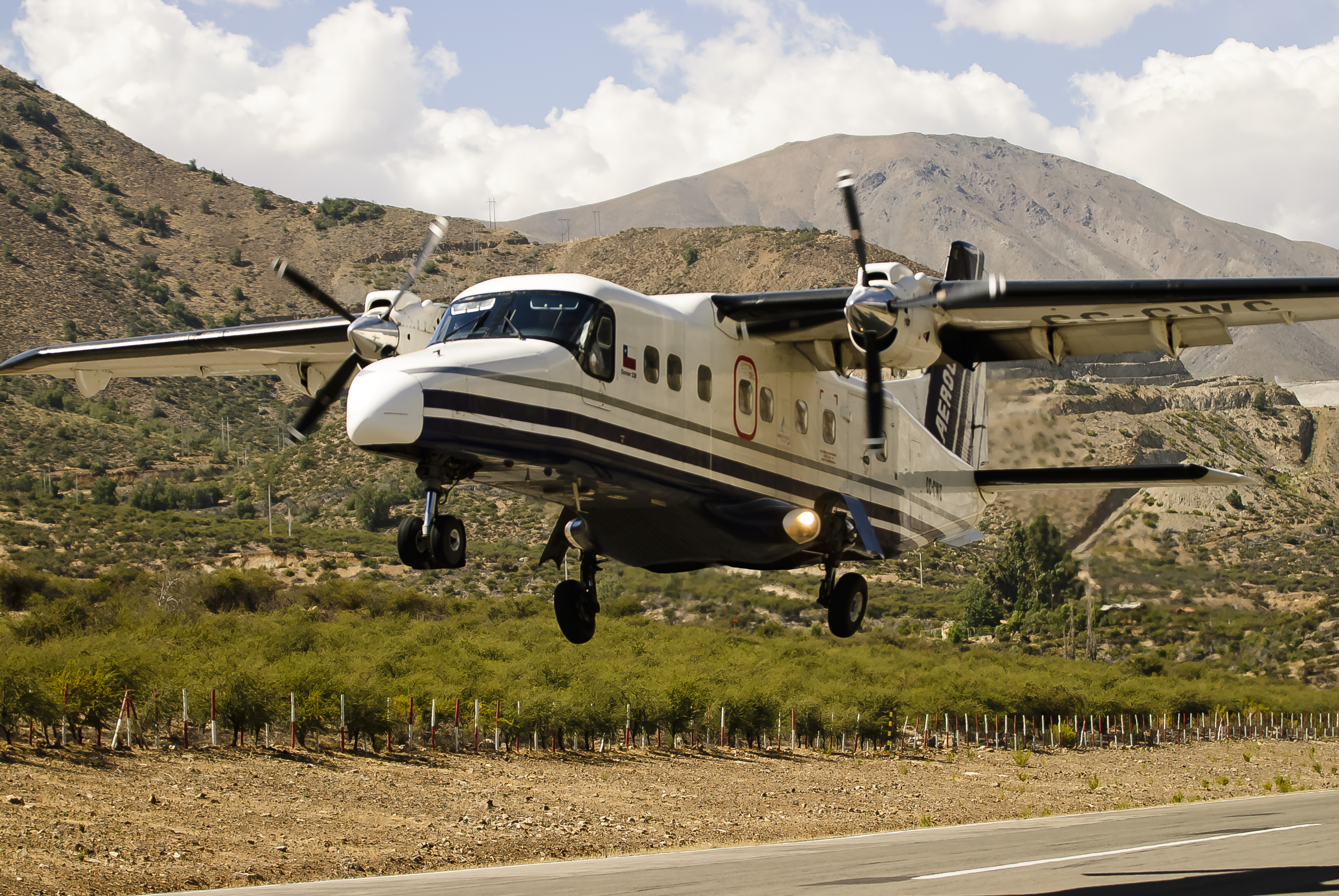
A Dornier 228 of Aerocardal taking off

Its fleet includes the following aircraft (as of July 2020):

- 2 Gulfstream G150
- 1 Gulfstream G280
- 1 Pilatus PC12
- 1 Dornier 228-100 (at August 2025)
- 2 Dornier 228-200 (at August 2025)
- 1 Eurocopter BO-105LS
- 3 Agusta Grand

=== Former fleet ===
- 2 Cessna Citation S550
- 2 Dornier 328-100
- 1 Piper Navajo Panther
- 1 Piper Cheyenne I
- 1 Cessna C421 Golden Eagle
- 1 Cirrus SR22 GTS X Edition
- 1 Eurocopter BO-105CB
- 1 Eurocopter EC135 T2
