= Juan Fernández (commune) =

Juan Fernández Islands Archipiélago Juan Fernández
- Special Territory and Commune
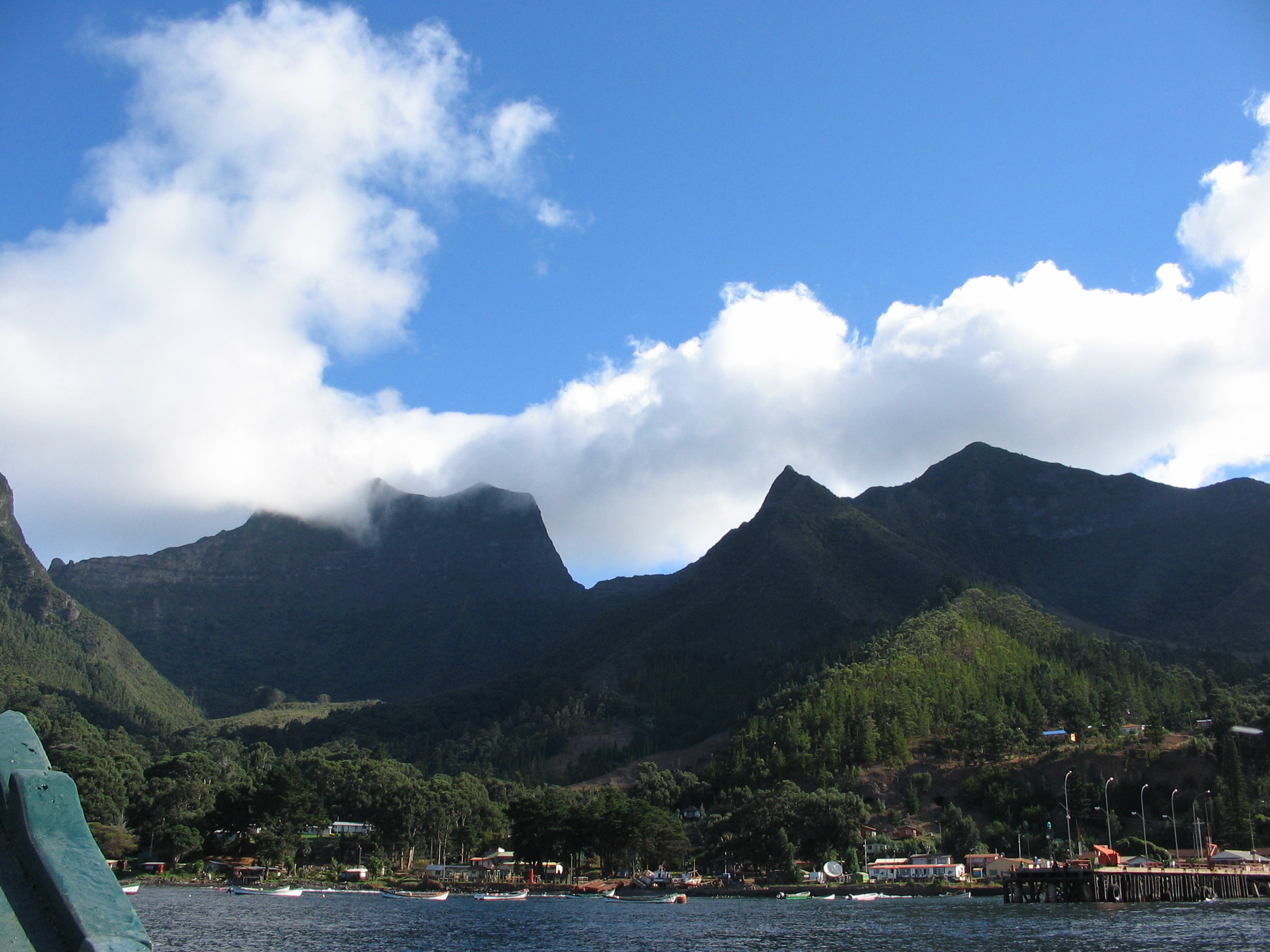
- The town of San Juan Bautista, Robinson Crusoe Island

- Flag Coat of arms Location in Valparaíso Region Location in Chile
- Coordinates: 33°38′29″S 78°50′28″W
- Country: Chile
- Region: Valparaíso
- Province: Valparaíso
- Commune: Juan Fernández
- Discovered: 22 November 1574
- Colony status: 1895
- Commune created: 21 September 1979
- Special territory status: 30 July 2007
- Named for: Juan Fernández
- Capital: San Juan Bautista

Government
  - Type: Municipality
  - Body: Municipal council
  - Alcalde (Mayor): Pablo Andrés Manríquez Angulo (Ind.)

Area
  - Total: 99.6 km^{2} (38.5 sq mi)
- Elevation (Cerro de Los Inocentes): 1,268 m (4,160 ft)

Population (2012 Census)
  - Total: 900
  - Density: 9.0/km^{2} (23/sq mi)
  - Urban: 800
  - Rural: 100

Sex
  - Men: 536
  - Women: 364
- Time zone: UTC-4 (CLT)
  - Summer (DST): UTC-3 (CLST)
- Area code: 56
- Currency: Peso (CLP)
- Website: Juan Fernández Islands

Juan Fernández is a commune located in the Valparaíso Province of the Valparaíso Region, Chile. The commune's territory corresponds to the Juan Fernández Archipelago, including the islands of Robinson Crusoe, Alejandro Selkirk, Santa Clara, and several smaller islets. Due to its insular and remote condition, Juan Fernández is classified as a special-regime commune.

== History ==
The Juan Fernández Archipelago was discovered in the 16th century by the navigator Juan Fernández, who identified a westward maritime route between the Viceroyalty of Peru and Chile. The islands later became strategically significant as a stopover for European navigation in the South Pacific.

In 1899, Chilean geographer Francisco Solano Asta-Buruaga described the islands as part of the Department of Valparaíso, noting their intermittent settlement and their use as a penal and military outpost during the colonial period. Following the Chilean defeat at the Battle of Rancagua in 1814, several supporters of independence were confined on the islands.

In 1924, geographer Luis Risopatrón reaffirmed the archipelago's administrative dependency on Valparaíso, emphasizing its limited but permanent population and its economic reliance on fishing and maritime activities.

=== Creation of the commune ===
The commune of Juan Fernández was officially created on 21 September 1979 by Decree Law No. 2868, which reorganized Chile's territorial divisions. Its municipality was formally established on 5 June 1980 through DFL 1-2868, granting local administrative autonomy. In 1984, the commune was designated a border zone, acknowledging its strategic location in the Pacific Ocean.

== Administration ==
Local administration is carried out by the Municipality of Juan Fernández, an autonomous public corporation headed by a mayor and municipal council, elected every four years by universal suffrage.

For the 2021–2024 term, the mayor is Pablo Manríquez Angulo (Independent–Social Democratic coalition). The commune belongs to Electoral District No. 7 and the 6th Senatorial Constituency (Valparaíso Region).

== Economy ==
Due to its geographic isolation, economic activity in the commune is limited. As of 2018, a total of 29 enterprises were registered in Juan Fernández. The local economy is primarily based on artisanal fishing, marine resource extraction, and small-scale service activities related to tourism and personal services.

== Census divisions ==
According to the National Institute of Statistics (INE), the commune is divided into the following census districts:

| District | Island | Category | Population (2017) |
|---|---|---|---|
| San Juan Bautista | Robinson Crusoe Island | Hamlet | 839 |
| Rada La Colonia | Alejandro Selkirk Island | Hamlet | 65 |

== See also ==
- Juan Fernández Archipelago
- Insular Chile
