= Continental Chile =

Term denoting Chilean territory on the American continent

Map of the three areas dividing the Chilean territory: Continental Chile Insular Chile Chilean Antarctica

Continental Chile is the name given to the Chilean territory located on the continental shelf of South America. This term serves to distinguish the South American area from the insular territories, known as Insular Chile, as from the Chilean Antarctica (Chilean Antarctic Territory). The existence of this three areas of effective or claimed Chilean sovereignty is what supports the existing tricontinental principle in this country.

The term "Continental Chile Time" specifies the time zone of most of Continental Chile, Juan Fernández Islands and Desventuradas Islands, as UTC−4 in winter and UTC−3 in summer. However, the regions of Aysén and Magallanes and Chilean Antarctica use UTC−3 all year. Easter Island and Isla Salas y Gómez, both in Polynesia, use UTC−6 in winter and UTC−5 in summer.

Continental Chile has a surface of 756,770 km^{2}, representing 99.976% of the total surface of the country under effective administration. However, considering the claim in Antarctic, this percent fall down to only 37.71% of national's surface.

With regard to the population, according to the 2002 census, it had a total of 15,111,881 inhabitants, corresponding to 99.97% of the national population.
