= Insular Chile =

Islands owned by Chile

Map of the three areas dividing Chilean territory: In blue: Continental Chile In red: Insular Chile In green: Antarctic Chile

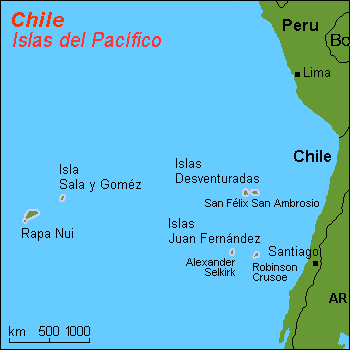
Map of what is considered insular Chile.

Insular Chile, also called Las islas Esporádicas, or 'the Sporadic Islands', is a scattered group of oceanic islands of volcanic origin located in the South Pacific, and which are under the sovereignty of Chile. The islands lie on the Nazca Plate, separate from the South American continental plate.

Despite not being continental islands, the Juan Fernández Islands and the Desventuradas Islands are considered "Continental Insular Chile"; Salas y Gómez Island and Easter Island (both geographically situated in Polynesia) form the zone known as "Oceanic Insular Chile". All of insular Chile is administrated as part of the Valparaíso Region.

== History ==
Easter Island was first inhabited by a Polynesian culture known as the Rapa Nui, and the Rapa Nui knew about Salas y Gómez Island during prehistoric times. As such, academics often group them in with Oceania rather than South America. Descendants of the ancient Rapa Nui make up the majority of Easter Island's current population, and they still consider themselves Polynesians, not associating their island with the culture of South America.

The Juan Fernández Islands and Desventuradas Islands are geographically closer to South America, and there is no evidence to suggest a link to Polynesians. However, they were also never inhabited by any Indigenous American group, unlike with the Caribbean Islands in the Atlantic Ocean. The Juan Fernández Islands and Desventuradas Islands have been included in wider definitions of Oceania, that extend it beyond the ethnocultural regions of Australasia, Melanesia, Micronesia and Polynesia. This is not only because of their status as remote Pacific islands with no geologicial connections to the Americas, but also because of their marine fauna, which shares many similarities to the rest of Oceania.

The San Félix and San Ambrosio Islands of the Desventuradas Archipelago, as well as Easter Island, are mentioned by the abbot Giovanni Ignazio Molina as part of Chilean territory in his work Compendio de la historia geográfica, natural y civil del reyno de Chile (1788), and therefore are considered part of the territory inherited by Chile under the principle of uti possidetis iuris.

== Geography and environment ==
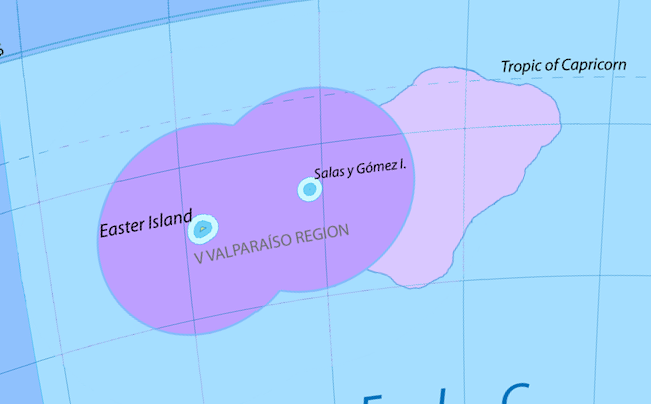
Easter Island or Rapa Nui and Salas y Gómez Island, Chile, its territorial waters and its extended continental shelf. Exclusive Economic Zone and Continental Shelf Extended Continental Shelf

The Sporadic Islands are not the only Chilean insular territories; rather, these islands represent just 328 square kilometres (127 square miles), around 0.3%, of the total, the rest being 3,739 islands and 2,180 islets, the combined land area of which totals 105,561 square kilometres (40,757 square miles), comprising nearly 14% of Chilean territory.

Insular Chile consists of:

1. The Juan Fernández Islands, composed of Robinson Crusoe, Alejandro Selkirk and Santa Clara islands, located 670 kilometres (420 miles) west of Valparaíso
2. The Desventuradas Islands, composed of San Ambrosio and San Félix Islands, located more than 800 kilometres (500 miles) west of continental Chile, opposite the Atacama Region
3. Easter Island, or Rapa Nui, 3,600 kilometres (2,200 miles) west of Caldera, with an area of 163.6 square kilometres (63.2 square miles) – the main island of the Sporadic Islands
4. Salas y Gómez Island, located 3,220 kilometres (2,000 miles) west of Chañaral and 415 kilometres (258 miles) northeast of Easter Island.

Of these islands, only Easter Island and Robinson Crusoe are inhabited. Of the two, Easter Island is the farthest from the South American continent. The Juan Fernández archipelago has become culturally South American, due to the lack of human inhabitation prior to European discovery.

The Sporadic islands are part of the Valparaíso Region. Easter Island and Salas y Gómez form the commune of Isla de Pascua, the only commune of Isla de Pascua Province. The Desventuradas islands and Juan Fernández belong to Valparaíso Province, and are part of the commune of Juan Fernández.

Scientific journal PLOS One wrote about the islands in 2016, claiming "Chile's offshore islands are among the few oceanic archipelagos along the west coast of South America. These islands have cultural and ecological connections to the broader insular Pacific, yet our scientific understanding of them is extremely limited." They also said, "The Juan Fernández and Desventuradas islands are distinct ecoregions within the Temperate South American realm. They possess a unique mix of tropical, subtropical and temperate marine species, and although close to continental South America, elements of the biota have greater affinities with the central and south Pacific, owing to the Humboldt Current, which creates a strong biogeographic barrier between these islands and the continent."

== See also ==
- Chilean Sea
- Islands of Chile
- Tricontinental Chile
