= Nothomyrcia =

Conservation status
- Critically Endangered (IUCN 3.1)

Scientific classification
- Kingdom: Plantae
- Clade: Tracheophytes
- Clade: Angiosperms
- Clade: Eudicots
- Clade: Rosids
- Order: Myrtales
- Family: Myrtaceae
- Genus: Nothomyrcia; Kausel
- Species: N. fernandeziana

Binomial name
- Nothomyrcia fernandeziana (Hook. & Arn.) Kausel

Synonyms
- Eugenia fernandeziana (Hook. & Arn.) Barnéoud; Eugenia lumilla Phil.; Luma fernandeziana (Hook. & Arn.) Burret; Nothomyrcia fernandeziana (Hook. & Arn.) Kausel; Myrceugenia fernandeziana (Hook. & Arn.) Johow; Myrceugenia luma O.Berg; Myrtus fernandeziana Hook. & Arn.; Myrtus maxima Molina; Nothomyrcia maxima (Molina) Gunckel

Species of flowering plant

Nothomyrcia is a genus in the family Myrtaceae, the myrtle family. It is a monotypic taxon, with Nothomyrcia fernandeziana (Luma de Juan Fernández) as the sole species in the genus. Nothomyrcia fernandeziana is a tree endemic to Robinson Crusoe Island in the Juan Fernández Islands of Chile.

== Description ==
Nothomyrcia fernandeziana can grow to 20–28 meters in height and up to 1 meter in diameter with mature specimens. Its bark is whitish or grayish, and its leaves are 3–10 cm long by 1.5–3.2 cm wide. The leaves are hypostomatic with anomocytic stomatal complexes. Nothomyrcia fernandeziana has hermaphrodite flowers with 4 sepals and 4 white petals with numerous stamens.

Its fruits are small (8 x 8 mm), reddish when ripe with 2–3 aromatic seeds, and are dispersed by birds and by gravity. Its maximum age is approximately 250 years with average radial growth of 0.16 to 0.3 cm per year. There is no distinction between its sapwood and heartwood, and its dense, resistant properties have historically made it useful for constructing boats, posts, and agricultural tools.

== Distribution ==
Nothomyrcia fernandeziana is endemic to the montane forests of Robinson Crusoe Island where it historically formed dense stands with species like Drimys confertifolia. The impact of introduced shrubs like Aristotelia chilensis and Rubus ulmifolius is higher in the Nothomyrcia forests than it is in areas of tree ferns.

Nothomyrcia fernandeziana is at severe risk of habitat loss, as its estimated extent of occurrence is less than 36 km^{2}. Threats from introduced herbivores like rabbits, rats, and domestic livestock have caused IUCN to list this species as critically endangered.
