= Robinson Crusoe Airport =

Airport on Isla Robinson Crusoe, Chile

- IATA: none; ICAO: SCIR

Summary
- Airport type: Public
- Serves: Robinson Crusoe Island, Chile
- Elevation AMSL: 466 ft (142 m)
- Coordinates: 33°40′00″S 78°55′43″W

Map
- Location of Robinson Crusoe Airport in Chile

Runways
Direction	Length		Surface
Direction	m	ft	Surface
14/32	1,005	3,297	Asphalt
16/34	631	2,070	Dirt
- Source: Landings.com Google Maps GCM

Robinson Crusoe Airport (Spanish: Aeródromo Robinson Crusoe) (ICAO: SCIR) is an airport serving Robinson Crusoe Island, a Pacific island 620 kilometres (390 mi) off the coast of Chile. The locale is one of the Juan Fernández Islands, being a portion of Chile's Valparaíso Region, and is 685 kilometres (426 mi) from Valparaíso.

A non-directional beacon (Ident: IRC) was on the eastern part of the island, 5.5 nautical miles (10.2 km) east-northeast of the airport. The beacon is likely decommissioned as it no longer listed on navigational charts.

Commercially, the airport is mainly served by a handful of air-taxi companies flying from Santiago, largely in the January-February timeframe, and seldom outside the November-March period. Rainy and windy conditions which may impact landings or takeoffs can occur anytime on the calendar.

Because of a lack of interior roads, transfer between the airport and San Juan Bautista, the main town on Robinson Crusoe, requires a 1.5 hour ride by motor launch.

== See also ==
- Transport in Chile
- List of airports in Chile
