= Battle of Más a Tierra =

WWI naval battle

- Part of the First World War
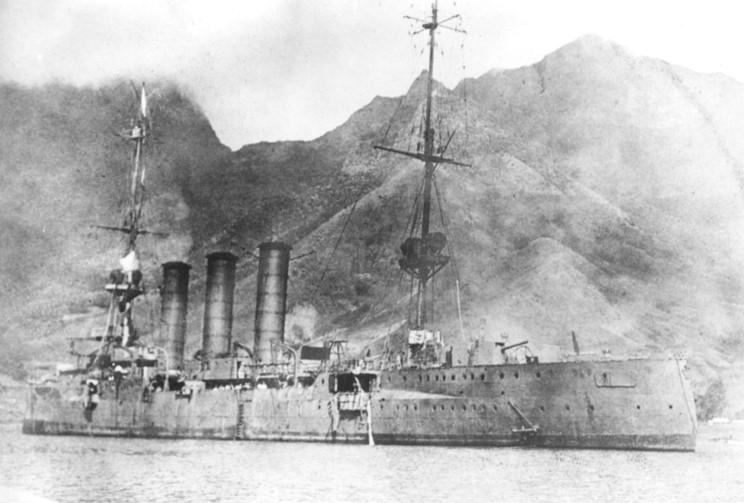
- SMS Dresden shortly before sinking at Cumberland Bay.
Date	14 March 1915
Location	Cumberland Bay, Más a Tierra 33°38′8″S 78°49′7″W
Result	British victory

Belligerents
United Kingdom	Germany

Commanders and leaders
(United Kingdom) John Luce	(German Empire) Fritz Lüdecke

Strength
Armoured cruiser Kent; Light cruiser Glasgow; Auxiliary cruiser Orama	Light cruiser Dresden

Casualties and losses
15 wounded	4 killed 14 wounded 315 interned Dresden scuttled

The Battle of Más a Tierra was a World War I sea battle fought on 14 March 1915, near the Chilean island of Más a Tierra, between a British squadron and a German light cruiser. The battle saw the last remnant of the German East Asia Squadron destroyed, when SMS Dresden was cornered and scuttled in Cumberland Bay.

== Background ==
After escaping from the Battle of the Falkland Islands, SMS Dresden and several auxiliaries retreated into the Pacific Ocean in an attempt to resume commerce raiding operations against Allied shipping. These operations did little to stop shipping in the area, but still proved troublesome to the British, who had to expend resources to counter the cruiser. On 8 March, his ship low on supplies and in need of repairs, the captain of Dresden decided to hide his vessel and attempt to coal in Cumberland Bay near the neutral island of Más a Tierra. By coaling in a neutral port rather than at sea, Captain Lüdecke gained the option of being able to intern the ship if she was discovered by enemy vessels.

British naval forces had been actively searching for the German cruiser and had intercepted coded wireless messages between German ships. Although they possessed copies of captured German code books, these also required a "key" which was changed from time to time. However, Charles Stewart, the signals officer, managed to decode a message from Dresden for a collier to meet her at Juan Fernandez on 9 March. A squadron made up of the cruisers HMS Kent and Glasgow along with the auxiliary cruiser Orama found Dresden in the harbour because her sailors had joined a football match on the shore. The British ships cornered Dresden in neutral Chilean territorial waters in the bay on 14 March, challenging her to battle.

== Battle ==
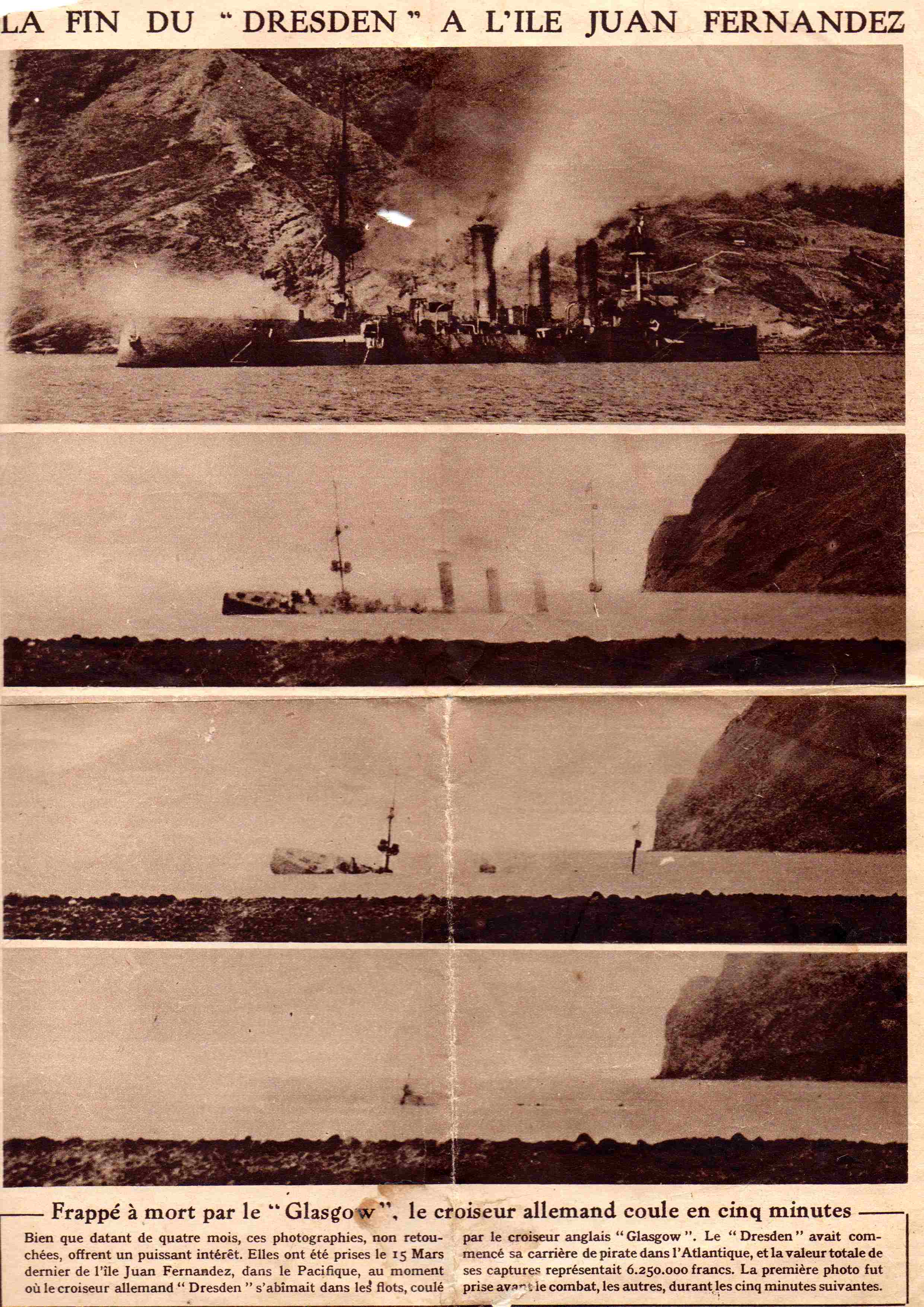
Dresden sinking, Le Miroir 20 June 1915

Glasgow opened fire on Dresden, damaging the vessel and setting her afire. After returning fire for a short period of time, the captain of Dresden decided the situation was hopeless as his vessel was vastly outgunned and outnumbered, while stranded in the bay with empty coal bunkers and worn out engines. Captain Lüdecke gave the order to abandon and scuttle his vessel. The German crew fled the cruiser in open boats to reach the safety of the island, which was neutral territory. The British cruisers kept up their fire on Dresden and the fleeing boats until the light cruiser eventually exploded, but it is unclear whether the explosion was caused by the firing from the British ships or from scuttling charges set off by the Germans. After the ship exploded, the British commander ordered his ships to capture any survivors from Dresden. Three Germans were killed in action and 15 wounded. The British suffered no casualties.

== Aftermath ==
With the sinking of Dresden, the last remnant of the German East Asian Squadron was destroyed, as all the other ships of the squadron had been sunk or interned. The only German presence left in the Pacific Ocean was a few isolated commerce raiders, such as SMS Seeadler and SMS Wolf. Because the island of Más a Tierra was a possession of Chile, a neutral country, the German Consulate in Chile protested that the British had broken international law by attacking an enemy combatant in neutral waters.

The wounded German sailors were taken to Valparaíso, Chile, for treatment, where one later died of wounds received during the action. The 315 of Dresden's crew who remained were interned by Chile until the end of the war, when those who did not wish to remain in Chile were repatriated to Germany.

One of the crew—Lieutenant Wilhelm Canaris, the future admiral and head of Abwehr—escaped internment in August 1915 and was able to return to Germany in October 1915, where he returned to active duty in the Imperial Navy.
