= Santa Clara Island =

Island of Chile

Native name: Isla Santa Clara
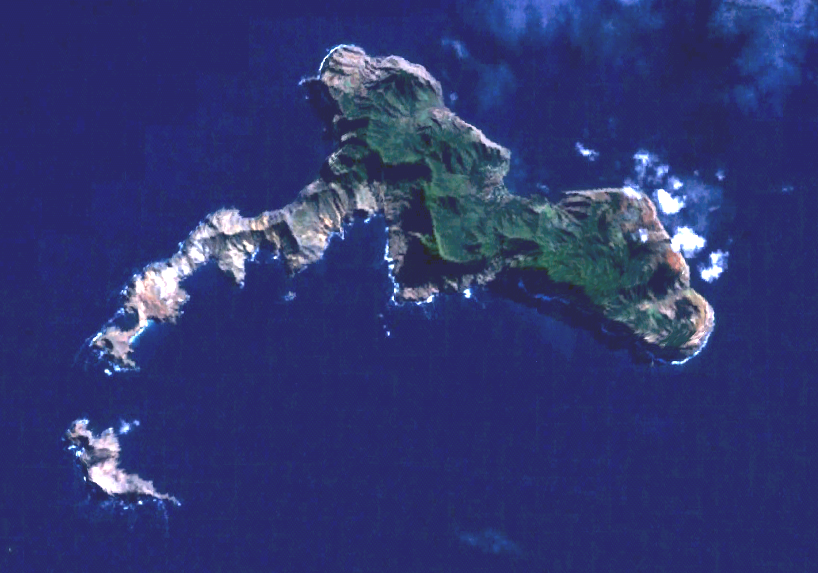
- Map showing tiny Santa Clara at bottom left

- Location within Chile

Geography
- Location: Pacific Ocean
- Coordinates: 33°42′25″S 78°56′29″W
- Type: Shield Volcanoes
- Archipelago: Juan Fernández Islands
- Area: 2.2 km^{2} (0.85 sq mi)
- Highest elevation: 376 m (1234 ft)
- Highest point: Johow Hill

Administration
- Chile

Demographics
- Population: Uninhabited

Santa Clara Island (Spanish: Isla Santa Clara) is a tiny, uninhabited island in the Pacific Ocean, off the coast of Robinson Crusoe Island in a group of islands known as the Juan Fernández Islands. The island is of volcanic origin and is approximately 1 km (0.6 mi) long and 0.6 km (0.4 mi) wide. The island group is politically part of the South American country Chile, and is administratively assigned to the Region of Valparaíso.

== Geography ==
Santa Clara is the smallest island of the Juan Fernandez Islands and has an area of about 2.2 km^{2} (0.8 mi^{2}). It is surrounded on the south side by a reef. This volcanic islet is related to a group of three islands. Located 1.5 km (0.9 mi) southwest of Robinson Crusoe Island, it has a mainly flat surface, with a maximum altitude of 376 m (1,234 ft) at Johow Hill. Based on its geomorphological characteristics and the composition of its lavas, it is postulated to be the earliest volcanic center which led to the emergence of Robinson Crusoe Island, and is, therefore, of greater antiquity - 5.8 million years (as compared to 3.8 - 4.2 million years).

Santa Clara includes volcanic rocks and several small beaches, including some white sand beaches. A short distance from the western extremity of Santa Clara Island, there is a small rocky islet, and, at the tip south of the same islet, there is a sandbar composed of various rocks which break the water. Coming from the north, the island of Santa Clara has the appearance of a cliff or escarpment; but approaching from the south, shows an eroded quirky aspect of conical mounds and strangely cut rocks. Waters surrounding the island have a rocky bottom, with strong currents. Access by boat to the island is dangerous, especially in stormy weather, because the strong sea breaks on all sides.

== Climate ==
Being low-lying in elevation, Santa Clara catches relatively little rainfall. The amount of rainfall also depends on the El Niño-Southern Oscillation. The climate is subtropical, strongly influenced by fluctuations in the general northward flow of the cold sub-Antarctic Humboldt ocean current and the southeast trade winds, which create a high-winter and low-summer rainfall pattern and a stable temperature environment. Temperatures range throughout the year from 3 °C (37 °F) to 34 °C (93 °F), with an annual mean of 15.4 °C (60 °F).

== Flora and fauna ==
Santa Clara is generally desolate and barren, but on its eastern slope there are some trees, and on the northwest tip a periodical stream of water runs along the gorge, which reaches the sea. The low vegetation has been eroded in the past by herds of goats up on the rocks. The native flora is characterized by low fire tolerance and poor adaptation to herbivore resistance. Feral rabbits are the greatest threat because they exert devastating effects on the island’s habitats.

The majority of the original vegetation on the island has been replaced by shrubs and grasses. The vegetation is a miniature mosaic of matorral, barren rock, various size trees, and shrubs mixed with ferns and perennial herbs. Nearly all of Santa Clara is abundant in the introduced Rubus ulmifolius, Aristotelia chilensis, Ugni molinae, Lantana camara and Lonicera japonica. Some have the potential to be serious pests, having fleshy fruits that are bird-dispersed, in addition to weeds such as Danthonia collina, Stipa laevissima and Piptochaetium bicolor. There are no permanent sources of fresh water on the island. Vertebrates inhabiting the islet include birds, some endangered, which make their nests on or visit the island. The island (along with neighbouring Robinson Crusoe Island) has been recognised as an Important Bird Area (IBA) by BirdLife International.

== Government ==
The uninhabited island is part of a municipality in the Region of Valparaíso, from which Easter Island is also administered. The main economic activities are fishing of the spiny lobster, Jasus frontalis, and tourism. The entire archipelago has been part of a nature reserve called the Archipiélago de Juan Fernández National Park since 1977.
