= Robinson Crusoe Island =

Island of Chile

Native name: Isla Robinson Crusoe
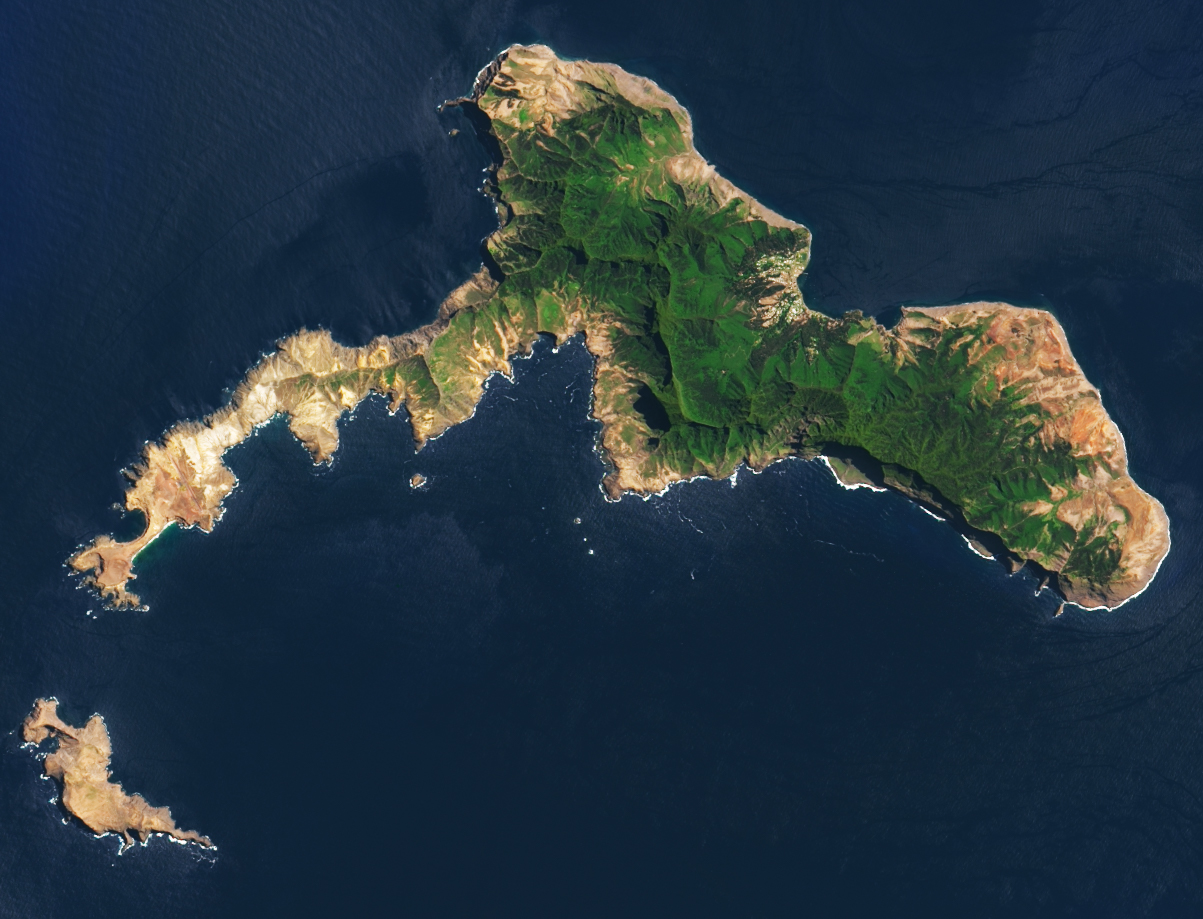
- Satellite image of Robinson Crusoe Island

- Location within Chile

Geography
- Coordinates: 33°38′29″S 78°50′28″W
- Type: Shield volcanoes (last eruption in 1835)
- Archipelago: Juan Fernández Islands
- Adjacent to: Pacific Ocean
- Area: 47.94 km^{2} (18.51 sq mi)
- Highest elevation: 915 m (3002 ft)
- Highest point: El Yunque

Administration
- Chile
- Region: Valparaíso
- Province: Valparaíso Province
- Commune: Juan Fernández

Demographics
- Population: 843 (2012)

Robinson Crusoe Island (Spanish: Isla Robinson Crusoe, pronounced [ˈisla ˈroβinsoŋ kɾuˈso]) is the second largest of the Juan Fernández Islands, situated 670 km (362 nmi; 416 mi) west of San Antonio, Chile, in the South Pacific Ocean. It is the more populous of the inhabited islands in the archipelago (the other being Alejandro Selkirk Island), with most of that in the town of San Juan Bautista at Cumberland Bay on the island's north coast. The island was formerly known as Más a Tierra ('Closer to Land').

From 1704 to 1709, the island was home to the marooned Scottish sailor Alexander Selkirk, who at least partially inspired novelist Daniel Defoe's fictional Robinson Crusoe in his 1719 novel, although the novel is explicitly set in the Caribbean. This was just one of several survival stories from the period of which Defoe would have been aware. To reflect the literary lore associated with the island and attract tourists, the Chilean government renamed it Robinson Crusoe Island in 1966.

== History ==
The island was first named Juan Fernandez Island after Juan Fernández, a Spanish sea captain and explorer who was the first to land there in 1574. It was also known as Más a Tierra. There is no evidence of an earlier discovery either by Polynesians, despite the proximity to Easter Island, or by Native Americans.

From 1681 to 1684, a Miskito man known as Will was marooned on the island. Twenty years later, in 1704, the sailor Alexander Selkirk was also marooned there, living in solitude for four years and four months. Selkirk had been gravely concerned about the seaworthiness of his ship, Cinque Ports (which ended up sinking very shortly after), and declared his wish to be left on the island during a mid-voyage restocking stop. His captain, Thomas Stradling, a colleague on the voyage of privateer and explorer William Dampier, was tired of his dissent and obliged. All Selkirk had left with him was a musket, gunpowder, carpenter's tools, a knife, a Bible, and some clothing. The story of Selkirk's rescue is included in the 1712 book A Voyage to the South Sea, and Round the World by Edward Cooke.

In an 1840 narrative, Two Years Before the Mast, Richard Henry Dana Jr. described the port of Juan Fernandez as a young prison colony. The penal institution was soon abandoned and the island again uninhabited before a permanent colony was eventually established in the latter part of the 19th century. Joshua Slocum visited the island between 26 April and 5 May 1896, during his solo global circumnavigation on the sloop Spray. The island and its 45 inhabitants are referred to in detail in Slocum's memoir, Sailing Alone Around the World.

=== World War I ===
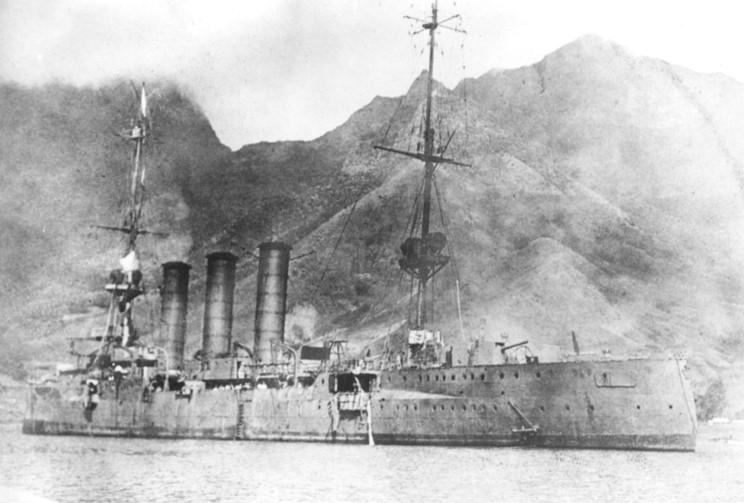
SMS Dresden, just prior to its scuttling in Cumberland Bay

During World War I, German Vice Admiral Maximilian von Spee's East Asia Squadron stopped and re-coaled at the island 26–28 October 1914, four days before the Battle of Coronel. While at the island, the admiral was unexpectedly rejoined by the armed merchant cruiser Prinz Eitel Friedrich, which he had earlier detached to attack Allied shipping in Australian waters. On 9 March 1915 SMS Dresden, the last surviving cruiser of von Spee's squadron after his death at the Battle of the Falklands, returned to the island's Cumberland Bay, hoping to be interned by the Chilean authorities. Caught and fired upon by a British squadron at the Battle of Más a Tierra on 14 March, the ship was scuttled by its crew.

=== 2010 tsunami ===
On 27 February 2010, Robinson Crusoe Island was hit by a tsunami following a magnitude 8.8 earthquake. The tsunami was about 3 m (10 ft) high when it reached the island. Sixteen people were killed and most of the coastal village of San Juan Bautista was washed away. The only warning the islanders had come from 12-year-old girl Martina Maturana, who noticed the sudden drawback of the sea that forewarned of the arrival of a tsunami and saved many of her neighbours from harm.

== Geography ==
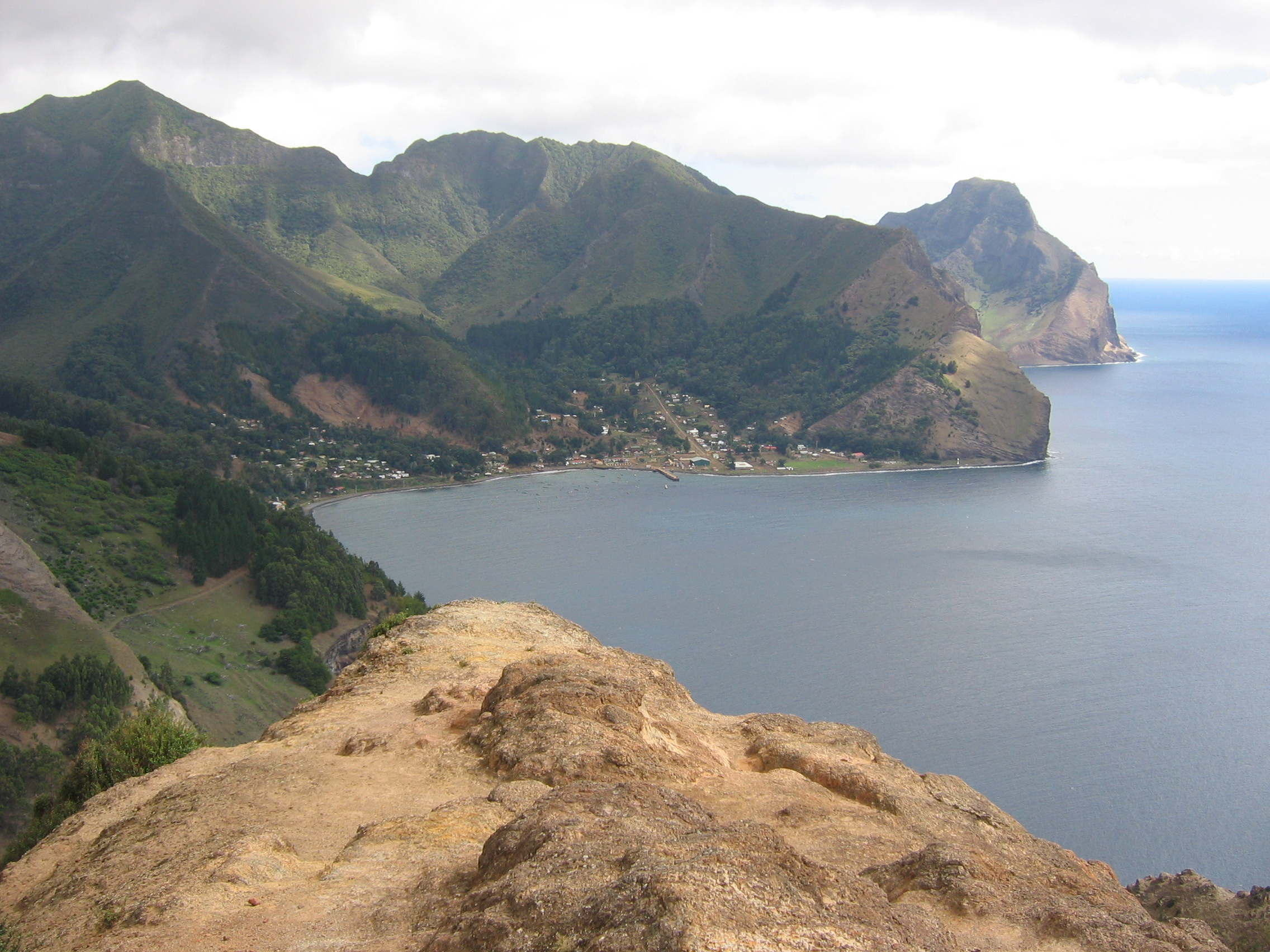
April 2005 view of the town of San Juan Bautista, on the north coast at Cumberland Bay

Robinson Crusoe Island has a mountainous and undulating terrain, formed by ancient lava flows, which have built up from numerous volcanic episodes. The highest point on the island is 915 m (3,002 ft) above sea level at El Yunque. Intense erosion has resulted in the formation of steep valleys and ridges. A narrow peninsula is formed in the southwestern part of the island, called Cordón Escarpado. The island of Santa Clara is located just off the southwest coast.

Robinson Crusoe Island lies to the west of the boundary between the Nazca Plate and the South American Plate; it rose from the ocean 3.8–4.2 million years ago. A volcanic eruption on the island was reported in 1743 from El Yunque, but this event is uncertain. On 20 February 1835, a day-long eruption began from a submarine vent 1.6 kilometres (1.0 mi) north of Punta Bacalao. The event was quite minor—only a Volcanic Explosivity Index 1 eruption—but it produced explosions and flames that lit up the island, along with tsunamis.

== Climate ==
Robinson Crusoe has a subtropical climate, moderated by the cold Humboldt Current, which flows to the east of the island, and the southeast trade winds. Temperatures range from 3 °C (37 °F) to 28.8 °C (83.8 °F), with an annual mean of 15.7 °C (60.3 °F). Higher elevations are generally cooler, with occasional frosts. Rainfall is greater in the winter months, and varies with elevation and exposure; elevations above 500 m (1,640 ft) experience almost daily rainfall, while the western, leeward side of the island is lower and drier.

Climate data for Juan Fernández Islands (1991-2020, extremes 1958-present)
Month	Jan	Feb	Mar	Apr	May	Jun	Jul	Aug	Sep	Oct	Nov	Dec	Year
Record high °C (°F)	28.8 (83.8)	27.8 (82.0)	27.0 (80.6)	26.0 (78.8)	24.9 (76.8)	22.2 (72.0)	22.6 (72.7)	24.4 (75.9)	21.8 (71.2)	23.5 (74.3)	25.2 (77.4)	26.9 (80.4)	28.8 (83.8)
Mean daily maximum °C (°F)	21.4 (70.5)	21.5 (70.7)	21.2 (70.2)	19.3 (66.7)	17.8 (64.0)	16.2 (61.2)	15.0 (59.0)	14.8 (58.6)	15.1 (59.2)	16.1 (61.0)	17.8 (64.0)	19.8 (67.6)	18.0 (64.4)
Daily mean °C (°F)	18.8 (65.8)	19.0 (66.2)	18.6 (65.5)	16.9 (62.4)	15.4 (59.7)	13.9 (57.0)	12.8 (55.0)	12.5 (54.5)	12.7 (54.9)	13.6 (56.5)	15.2 (59.4)	17.1 (62.8)	15.5 (59.9)
Mean daily minimum °C (°F)	16.2 (61.2)	16.5 (61.7)	16.0 (60.8)	14.4 (57.9)	13.1 (55.6)	11.7 (53.1)	10.6 (51.1)	10.2 (50.4)	10.3 (50.5)	11.1 (52.0)	12.6 (54.7)	14.5 (58.1)	13.1 (55.6)
Record low °C (°F)	11.4 (52.5)	4.2 (39.6)	9.0 (48.2)	8.2 (46.8)	6.3 (43.3)	4.8 (40.6)	5.0 (41.0)	3.0 (37.4)	5.0 (41.0)	6.2 (43.2)	7.3 (45.1)	9.2 (48.6)	3.0 (37.4)
Average rainfall mm (inches)	29.0 (1.14)	33.4 (1.31)	55.1 (2.17)	83.5 (3.29)	150.5 (5.93)	184.4 (7.26)	130.5 (5.14)	114.3 (4.50)	80.2 (3.16)	49.9 (1.96)	35.7 (1.41)	24.8 (0.98)	971.3 (38.24)
Average rainy days (≥ 1.0 mm)	5.6	6.1	8.8	11.2	14.6	16.4	15.9	13.5	11.1	8.3	6.0	5.4	123.0
Average relative humidity (%)	73	73	73	77	78	78	79	77	77	76	74	73	76
Mean monthly sunshine hours	206.7	178.9	170.4	126.9	103.0	85.1	98.5	123.4	139.0	171.6	178.4	195.7	1,777.6
Source 1: Dirección Meteorológica de Chile (humidity 1931–1960)
Source 2: World Meteorological Organization (precipitation days 1981–2010)

== Flora and fauna ==
The Fernandezian region is a floristic region which includes the Juan Fernández Islands archipelago. It is in the Antarctic floristic kingdom, but often also included within the Neotropical kingdom. As World Biosphere Reserves since 1977, these islands have been considered of maximum scientific importance because of the endemic plant families, genera, and species of flora and fauna. Out of 211 native plant species, 132 (63%) are endemic, as well as more than 230 species of insects.

Robinson Crusoe Island has one endemic plant family, Lactoridaceae. The Magellanic penguin is also found there. The Juan Fernández firecrown is an endemic and critically endangered red hummingbird, which is best known for its needle-fine black beak and silken feather coverage. The Masatierra petrel is named after the island's former name. The island (along with neighbouring Santa Clara) has been recognised as an Important Bird Area (IBA) by BirdLife International because it supports populations of Masatierra petrels, pink-footed shearwaters, Juan Fernandez firecrowns and Juan Fernandez tit-tyrants. The bones of a spade-toothed whale were found on the island in 1986. Only six other specimens of this species have ever been discovered.

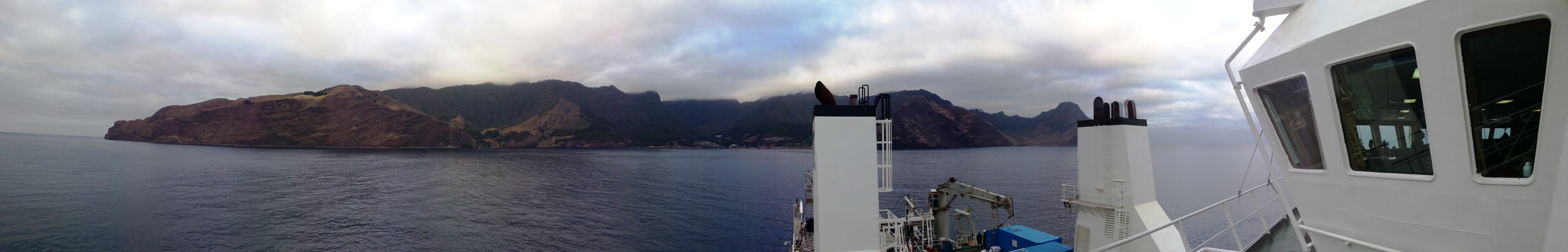
Robinson Crusoe Island, seen from CS Responder during work on a nuclear test ban hydroacoustic monitoring station in 2014

== Society ==
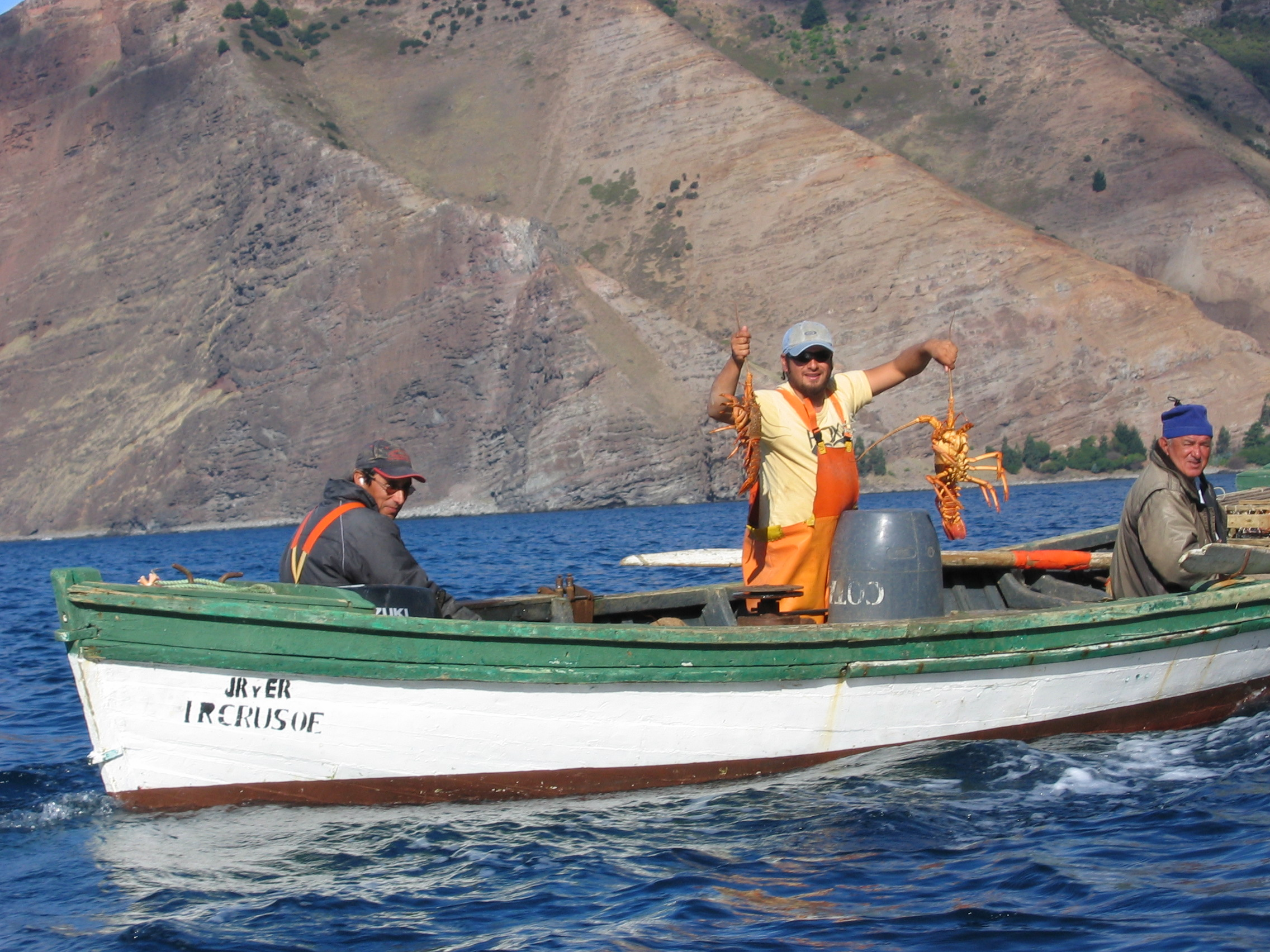
A fisherman with two spiny lobsters off Robinson Crusoe Island

Robinson Crusoe had an estimated population of 843 in 2012. Most of the island's inhabitants live in the village of San Juan Bautista on the north coast at Cumberland Bay. Although the community maintains a rustic serenity dependent on the spiny lobster trade, residents employ a few vehicles, a satellite Internet connection and televisions. The main airstrip, Robinson Crusoe Airfield, is located near the tip of the island's southwestern peninsula. The flight from Santiago de Chile is just under three hours. A ferry runs from the airstrip to San Juan Bautista.

Tourists number in the hundreds per year. One activity gaining popularity is scuba diving, particularly on the wreck of the German light cruiser Dresden, which was scuttled in Cumberland Bay during World War I.

== Maya statue hypothesis ==
A History Channel documentary was filmed on Robinson Crusoe Island. It aired on 3 January 2010 and showed two rock formations that Canadian explorer Jim Turner claimed were badly degraded Mayan statues. With no other sign of any pre-Columbian human presence on the island, however, the program has been criticized as lacking in scientific credibility.

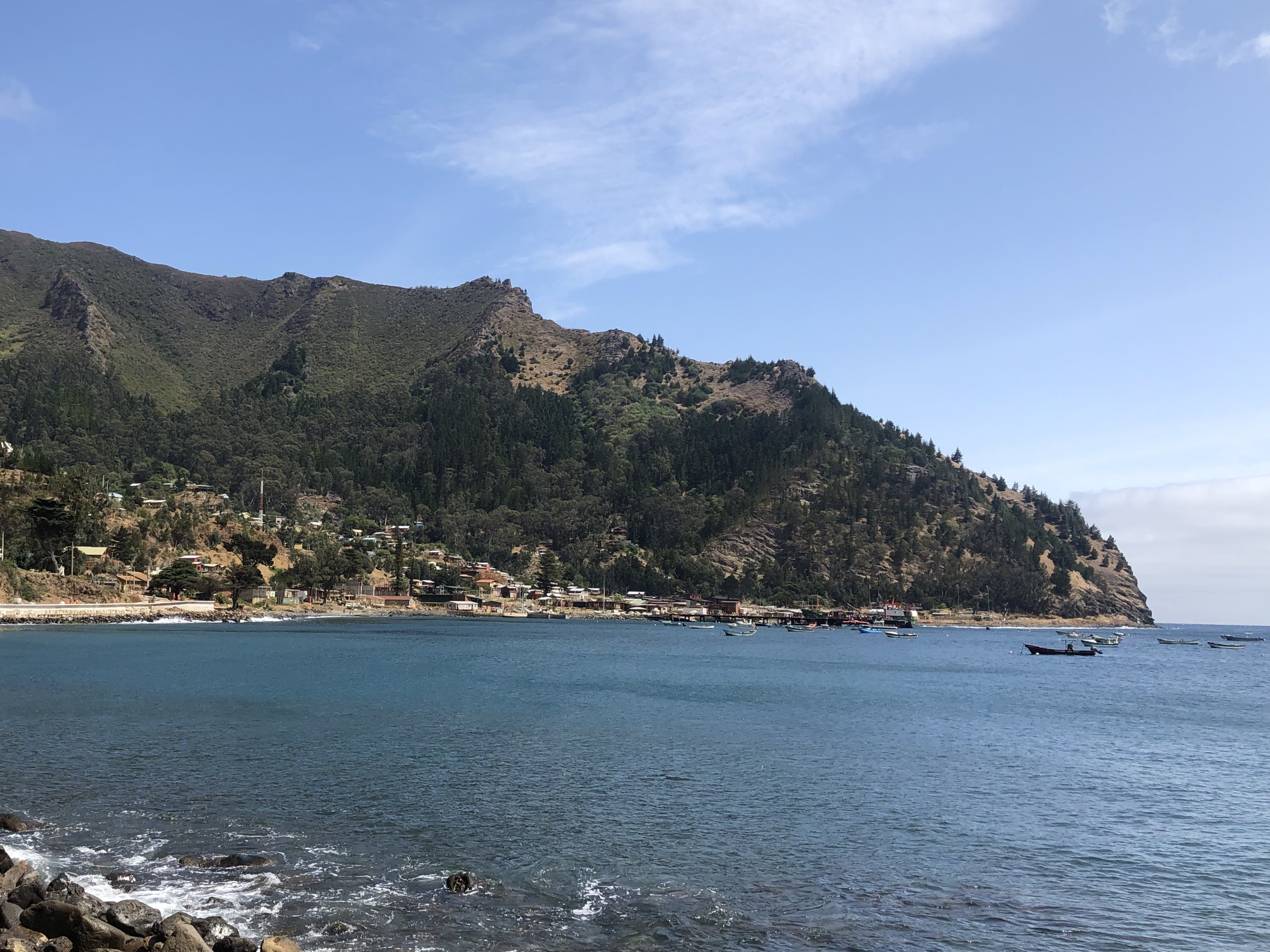
Robinson Crusoe Island bayside view of the town of San Juan Bautista

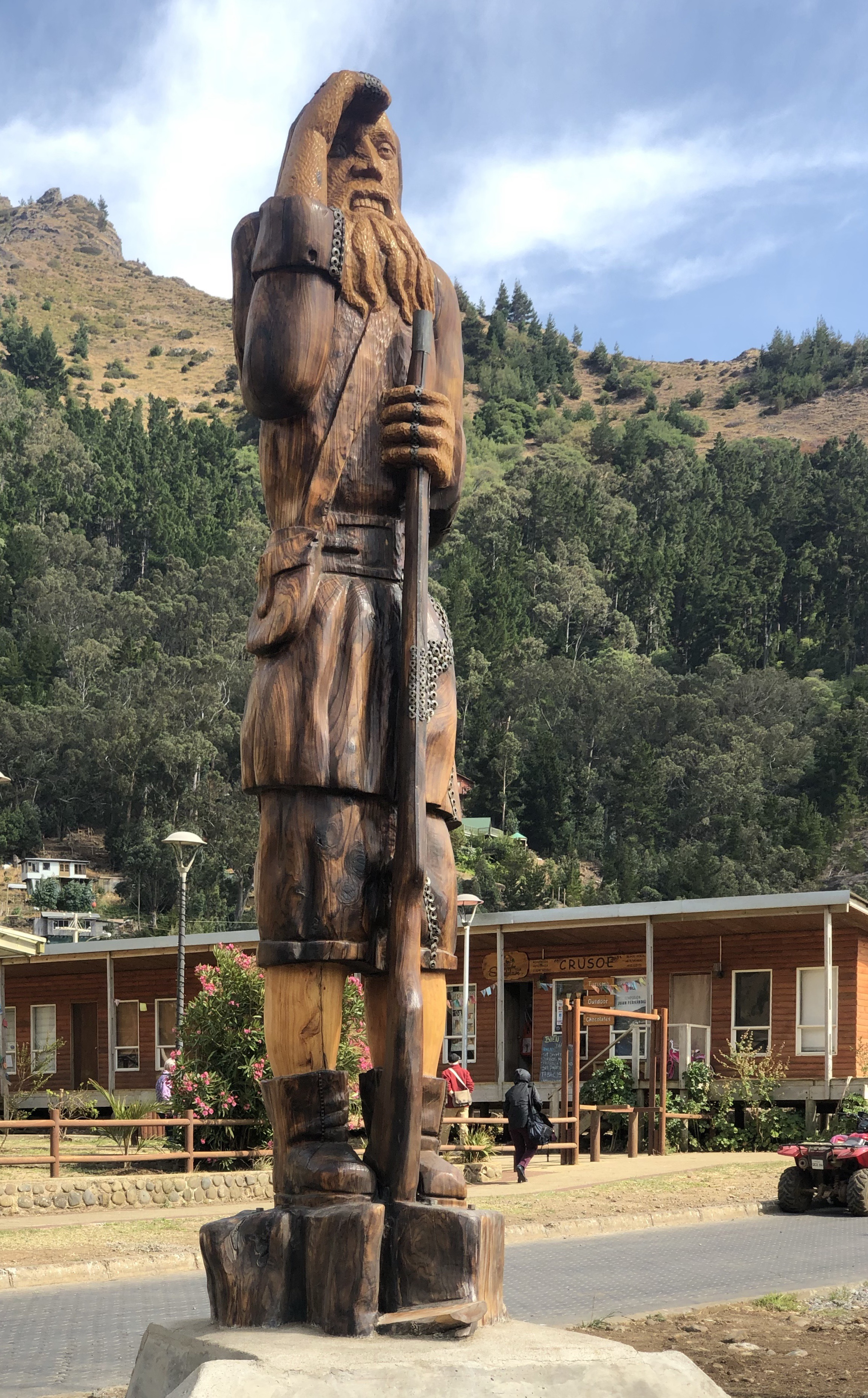
Robinson Crusoe Island statue of Robinson Crusoe in the town of San Juan Bautista

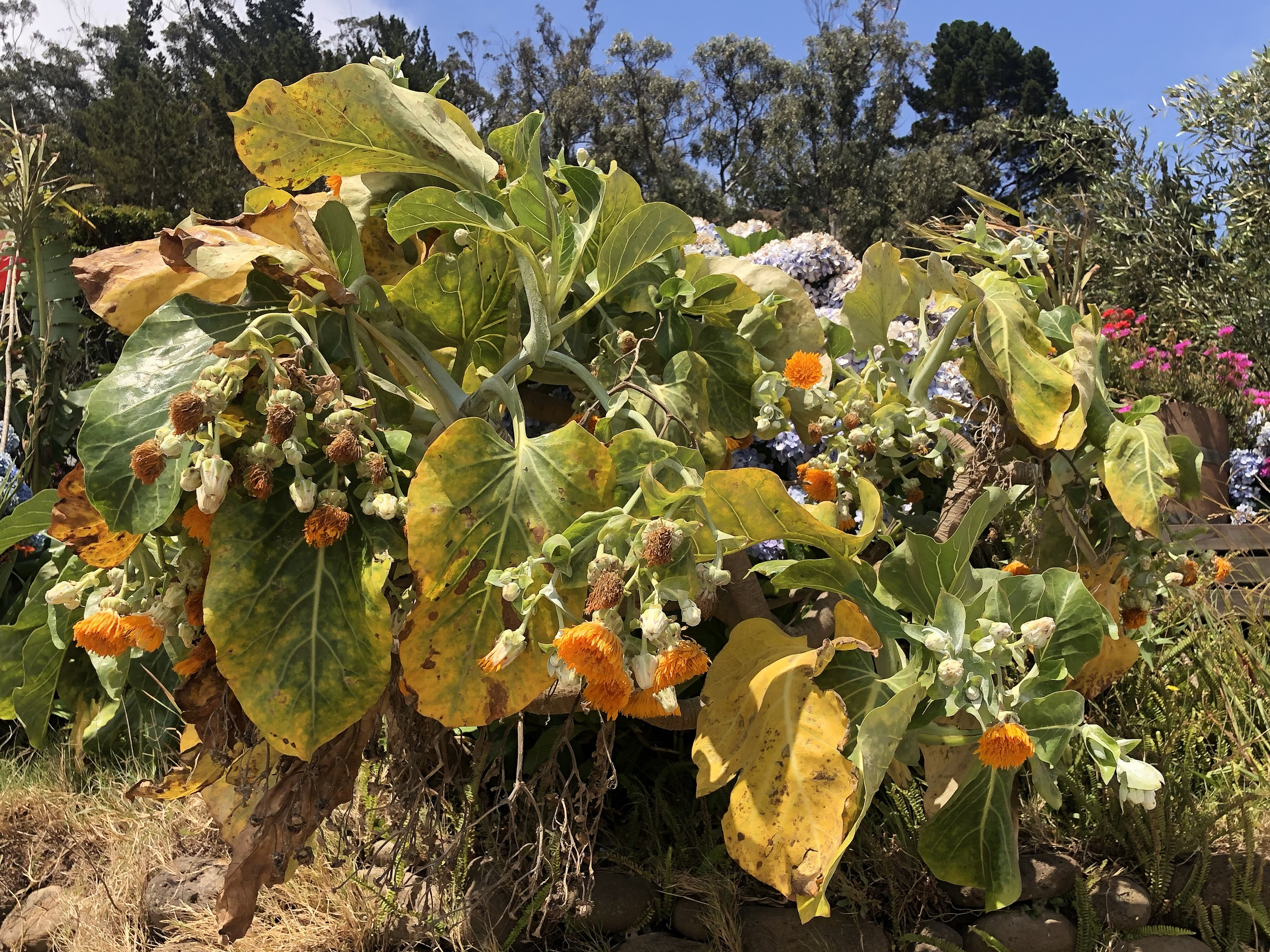
Robinson Crusoe Island Sonchus brassicifolius – Juan Fernández cabbage tree

== See also ==
- Fernandezian region
