= Juan Fernández Islands =

Chilean archipelago in the Pacific Ocean

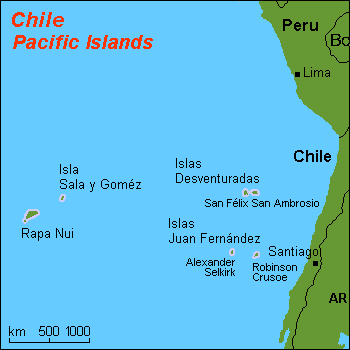
The Juan Fernández Islands and other neaby island groups

The Juan Fernández Islands (Spanish: Archipiélago Juan Fernández) are a sparsely inhabited series of islands in the South Pacific Ocean, reliant on tourism and fishing. Situated 670 km (362 nmi; 416 mi) off the coast of Chile, they are composed of three main volcanic islands: Robinson Crusoe, Alejandro Selkirk, and Santa Clara. The group is part of Insular Chile.

The islands are primarily known for having been the home to the marooned sailor Alexander Selkirk for more than four years from 1704, which may have inspired English writer Daniel Defoe's Robinson Crusoe. Most of the archipelago's present-day inhabitants reside on Robinson Crusoe Island, and mainly in the capital, San Juan Bautista, located at Cumberland Bay on the island's north coast.

The group of islands is part of Chile's Valparaíso Region (which also includes Easter Island) and forms the commune of Juan Fernández, one of the nine communes of Valparaíso Province. The islands are named after Juan Fernández, the explorer who discovered them in the 1570s.

== Geography ==
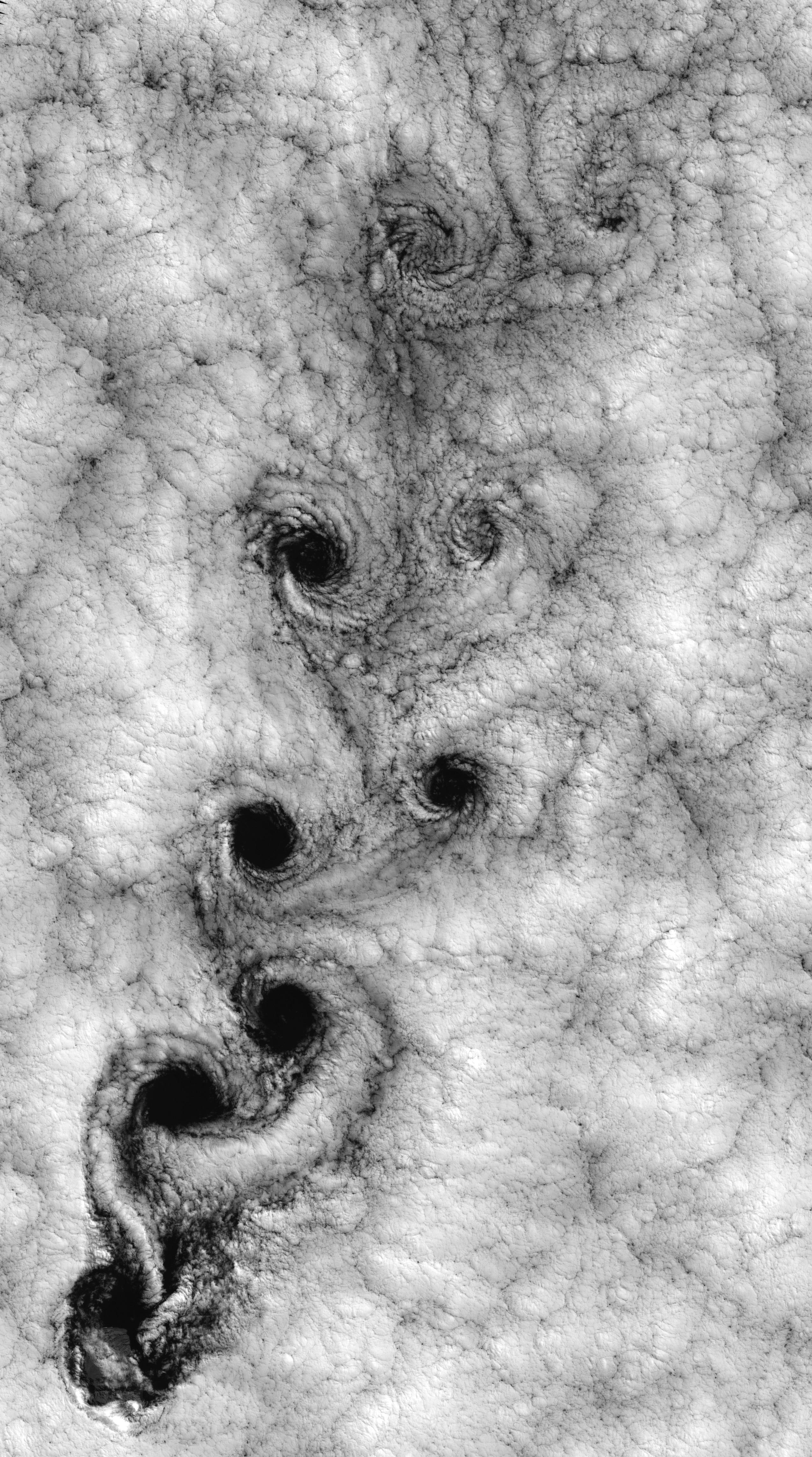
Landsat 7 image of the Juan Fernández Islands on 15 September 1999, shows the unique pattern of clouds known as "Kármán vortex street" caused by the interaction of winds with the islands' mountains

- Robinson Crusoe Island (33°38′00″S 78°51′00″W), also known as Isla Más a Tierra, is located closest to the mainland of continental South America, and is surrounded by a number of islets, including Juanango, Viñilla, Los Chamelos, Los Claveles and El Verdugo.
  - Santa Clara (33°42′07″S 79°00′05″W), lying 1 km (0.6 mi; 0.5 nmi) southwest of Robinson Crusoe.
- Alejandro Selkirk Island (33°46′00″S 80°47′00″W), also known as Isla Más Afuera, is located 180 km (112 mi; 97 nmi) farther west.

Alejandro Selkirk is the largest of the Juan Fernández Islands at 49.5 km^{2} (19.1 sq mi), and its highest peak, Cerro de Los Inocentes, is also the highest point of the archipelago at 1,268 m (4,160 ft). The island's population was 57 in 2012. Robinson Crusoe is the second-largest island in the archipelago at 47.9 km^{2} (18 sq mi); its highest peak, El Yunque, is 915 m (3,002 ft). The population of Robinson Crusoe was 843 in 2012. Santa Clara is 2.2 km^{2} (0.8 sq mi) in area and reaches a height of 375 m (1,230 ft). Santa Clara is uninhabited. The maximum elevations of Juan Fernández, 915 m (3,002 ft) for Robinson Crusoe and 1,329 m (4,360 ft) for Alejandro Selkirk, respectively, are high enough to cause the phenomenon known as Kármán vortex street, which can be seen from space.

The islands are volcanic in origin, produced by the movement of the Nazca Plate over the Juan Fernández hotspot. As the plate moved eastward over the hot spot, volcanic eruptions formed the Juan Fernández Ridge before being subducted under the South American continent at the Peru–Chile Trench. The islands occur where the peaks of the submarine ridge have protruded above sea level. Radiometric dating indicates that Santa Clara is the oldest of the islands, at 5.8 million years old, followed by Robinson Crusoe, 3.8 – 4.2 million years old, and Alexander Selkirk, 1.0 – 2.4 million years old.

The seafloor around Juan Fernández Islands is rich in Manganese–Iron nodules, which might be of potential economic interest.

Some consider the islands to be one of the easternmost points of Oceania, rather than an outlying region of South America. In their book Shore Fishes of Easter Island, authors John E. Randall and Alfredo Cea Egana claim that the Juan Fernández Islands have "great similarity in ichthyofauna with Oceania more so than with the nearing South America."

== Climate ==
The archipelago is diverse in climate taking into account its size, due to factors such as the topography, which causes the temperature and precipitation regime to change depending on the area of an island. In the Archipelago according to Trewartha's climate classification the windward slopes have a subtropical climate, while areas such as the eastern tip of Robinson Crusoe Island have a Semi-arid climate and the western and leeward areas have a Mediterranean climate. The weather is moderated by the cold Humboldt Current, which flows northward to the east of the islands, and the southeast trade winds. Temperatures range from 10 °C (50 °F) to 22 °C (72 °F), with an annual mean of 15.4 °C (60 °F). Higher elevations are generally cooler, with occasional frosts on Robinson Crusoe.

Average annual precipitation is 1,081 mm (42.6 in), varying from 318 mm (12.5 in) to 1,698 mm (66.9 in) year to year. Much of the variability in rainfall depends on the El Niño-Southern Oscillation. Rainfall is higher in the winter months, and varies with elevation and exposure; elevations above 500 m (1,640 ft) experience almost daily rainfall, while the western, leeward side of Robinson Crusoe and Santa Clara are quite dry.

Climate data for Juan Fernández Islands (1991-2020, extremes 1958-present)
| Month | Jan | Feb | Mar | Apr | May | Jun | Jul | Aug | Sep | Oct | Nov | Dec | Year |
|---|---|---|---|---|---|---|---|---|---|---|---|---|---|
| Record high °C (°F) | 28.8 (83.8) | 27.8 (82.0) | 27.0 (80.6) | 26.0 (78.8) | 24.9 (76.8) | 22.2 (72.0) | 22.6 (72.7) | 24.4 (75.9) | 21.8 (71.2) | 23.5 (74.3) | 25.2 (77.4) | 26.9 (80.4) | 28.8 (83.8) |
| Mean daily maximum °C (°F) | 21.4 (70.5) | 21.5 (70.7) | 21.2 (70.2) | 19.3 (66.7) | 17.8 (64.0) | 16.2 (61.2) | 15.0 (59.0) | 14.8 (58.6) | 15.1 (59.2) | 16.1 (61.0) | 17.8 (64.0) | 19.8 (67.6) | 18.0 (64.4) |
| Daily mean °C (°F) | 18.8 (65.8) | 19.0 (66.2) | 18.6 (65.5) | 16.9 (62.4) | 15.4 (59.7) | 13.9 (57.0) | 12.8 (55.0) | 12.5 (54.5) | 12.7 (54.9) | 13.6 (56.5) | 15.2 (59.4) | 17.1 (62.8) | 15.5 (59.9) |
| Mean daily minimum °C (°F) | 16.2 (61.2) | 16.5 (61.7) | 16.0 (60.8) | 14.4 (57.9) | 13.1 (55.6) | 11.7 (53.1) | 10.6 (51.1) | 10.2 (50.4) | 10.3 (50.5) | 11.1 (52.0) | 12.6 (54.7) | 14.5 (58.1) | 13.1 (55.6) |
| Record low °C (°F) | 11.4 (52.5) | 4.2 (39.6) | 9.0 (48.2) | 8.2 (46.8) | 6.3 (43.3) | 4.8 (40.6) | 5.0 (41.0) | 3.0 (37.4) | 5.0 (41.0) | 6.2 (43.2) | 7.3 (45.1) | 9.2 (48.6) | 3.0 (37.4) |
| Average precipitation mm (inches) | 29.0 (1.14) | 33.4 (1.31) | 55.1 (2.17) | 83.5 (3.29) | 150.5 (5.93) | 184.4 (7.26) | 130.5 (5.14) | 114.3 (4.50) | 80.2 (3.16) | 49.9 (1.96) | 35.7 (1.41) | 24.8 (0.98) | 971.3 (38.24) |
| Average precipitation days (≥ 1.0 mm) | 5.8 | 6.8 | 8.5 | 10.9 | 14.4 | 16.5 | 15.5 | 13.3 | 11.1 | 8.4 | 6.1 | 5.3 | 122.6 |
| Average relative humidity (%) | 73 | 73 | 73 | 77 | 78 | 78 | 79 | 77 | 77 | 76 | 74 | 73 | 76 |
| Mean monthly sunshine hours | 206.7 | 178.9 | 170.4 | 126.9 | 103.0 | 85.1 | 98.5 | 123.4 | 139.0 | 171.6 | 178.4 | 195.7 | 1,777.6 |
Source 1: Dirección Meteorológica de Chile (humidity 1931–1960)
Source 2: NOAA (precipitation days 1991-2020)

== Biota and ecology ==
Juan Fernandez Island in Chile has a high percentage of rare and endemic plants and animals, and are recognized as a distinct ecoregion. The volcanic origin and remote location of the islands meant that the islands' flora and fauna had to reach the archipelago from far across the sea; as a result, the island is home to relatively few plant species and very few animal species. The closest relatives of the archipelago's plants and animals are found in the Temperate broadleaf and mixed forests ecoregions of southern South America, including the Valdivian temperate forests, Magellanic subpolar forests, and San Félix–San Ambrosio Islands temperate forests.

=== Flora ===
The Juan Fernández Islands are renowned for their unique and diverse flora, characterized by a high degree of endemism. The archipelago comprises approximately 361 species of vascular plants, including 53 ferns, 65 monocots, and 243 dicots, spanning 73 families and 219 genera. Notably, there is one endemic family (Lactoridaceae), 12 endemic genera, and 126 endemic species, resulting in an endemism rate of 11% at the generic level and 60% at the species level.

Vegetation zones on the islands generally correspond to elevation. Grassy slopes with native and introduced species cover much of the lower altitudes of Robinson Crusoe Island (Isla Más a Tierra) and Alejandro Selkirk Island (Isla Más Afuera), as well as nearly all of Santa Clara Island. Tall lowland forests are dominated by the largest trees in the archipelago, including Drimys confertifolia, Myrceugenia fernandeziana (on Robinson Crusoe Island), and Myrceugenia schulzei (on Alejandro Selkirk Island). All three of these species are endemic to the ecoregion and considered vulnerable.

In the montane forests of Robinson Crusoe Island, the understory is notably composed of tree ferns such as Thyrsopteris elegans, which form dense forests at elevations around 700 to 750 meters. These forests also include species like Dicksonia berteroana and various Blechnum species. The dominant tree species in these montane forests include endemic genera such as Cuminia, Fagara, and Rhaphithamnus.

The flora of the Juan Fernández Islands has been significantly impacted by invasive plant species. On Robinson Crusoe Island, invasive species such as wild blackberry (Rubus ulmifolius) and maqui (Aristotelia chilensis) have colonized 80–90% of the native forest, exerting tremendous pressure on the remaining tracts of forest and the animals that depend on it.

Maps and satellite images of the islands

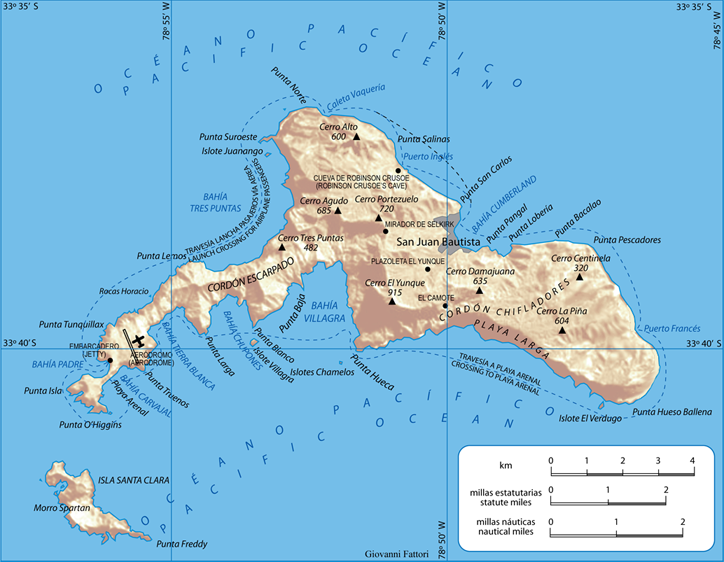
Map of Robinson Crusoe Island (including Santa Clara Island)

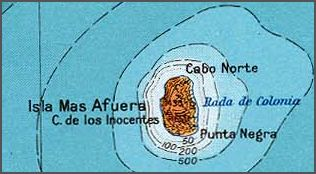
Map of Alejandro Selkirk Island

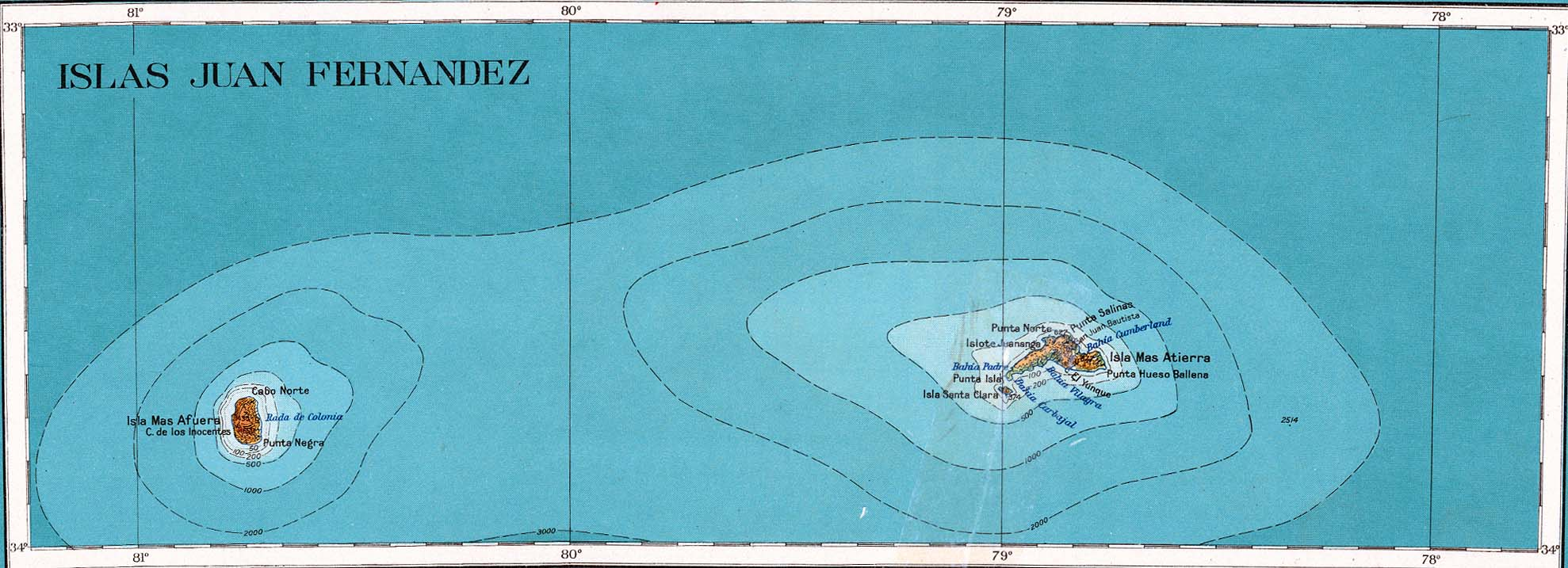
Map of both islands

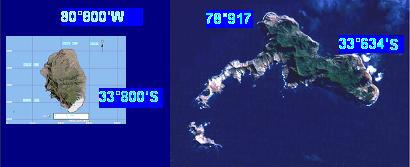
Satellite images of Juan Fernández Islands (Alejandro Selkirk Island, inset left)

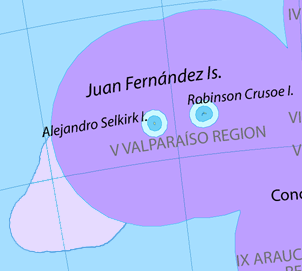
Juan Fernández Islands and its Extended continental shelf.

=== Fauna ===
The Juan Fernández Islands have a very limited fauna, with no native land mammals, reptiles, or amphibians. Seventeen land and sea-bird species breed on the islands. The island has three endemic bird species, and three endemic subspecies. Introduced fauna by humans include rats, goats and coati. Robinson Crusoe Island is home to an endemic and endangered hummingbird, the Juan Fernández firecrown (Sephanoides fernandensis). This large hummingbird, about 11 cm (4 in) long, is thought to number only about 500 individuals. The other endemic bird species are the Juan Fernández tit-tyrant (Anairetes fernandezianus) of Robinson Crusoe Island, and the Masafuera rayadito (Aphrastura masafuerae) of Alejandro Selkirk Island. The islands support the entire known breeding populations of two petrel species, Stejneger's Petrel Pterodroma longirostris (IUCN status VU) and the Juan Fernandez Petrel Pterodroma externa (IUCN status VU). In addition, the Juan Fernandez Islands may still support a third breeding petrel species, De Filippi's Petrel Pterodroma defilippiana (IUCN status VU), whose only other known breeding grounds are on the Desventuradas Islands. The Magellanic penguin breeds on Robinson Crusoe Island within the archipelago. All three islands of the Juan Fernandez archipelago have been recognised as Important Bird Areas (IBAs) by BirdLife International.

The endemic Juan-Fernandez spiny lobster (without claws) lives in the marine waters (Jasus frontalis). The Juan Fernández fur seal (Arctophoca philippii) also lives on the islands. This species was nearly exterminated in the sixteenth to nineteenth century, but it was rediscovered in 1965. A census in 1970 found about 750 fur seals living there. Only two were sighted on the Desventuradas Islands, located some 780 km (485 mi) to the north. The actual population of the Desventuradas may be higher, because the species tends to hide in sea caves. There seems to be a yearly population increase of 16–17 percent.

== History ==
=== Prehistory ===
A 2008 report by archaeologists from the Australian National University states that, "a combination of palaeoecology and archaeology in the Juan Fernández Islands showed it was unlikely there had been human activity in the islands before Europeans arrived." Ichthyologists Ingo Hahn and Uwe Römer wrote in 2002, "the geographically isolated Juan Fernández Islands were probably untouched by man until their discovery by European sailors in 1574. It is unknown if Polynesians, or if native Americans from South America, reached or settled it at any point."

=== Discovery ===
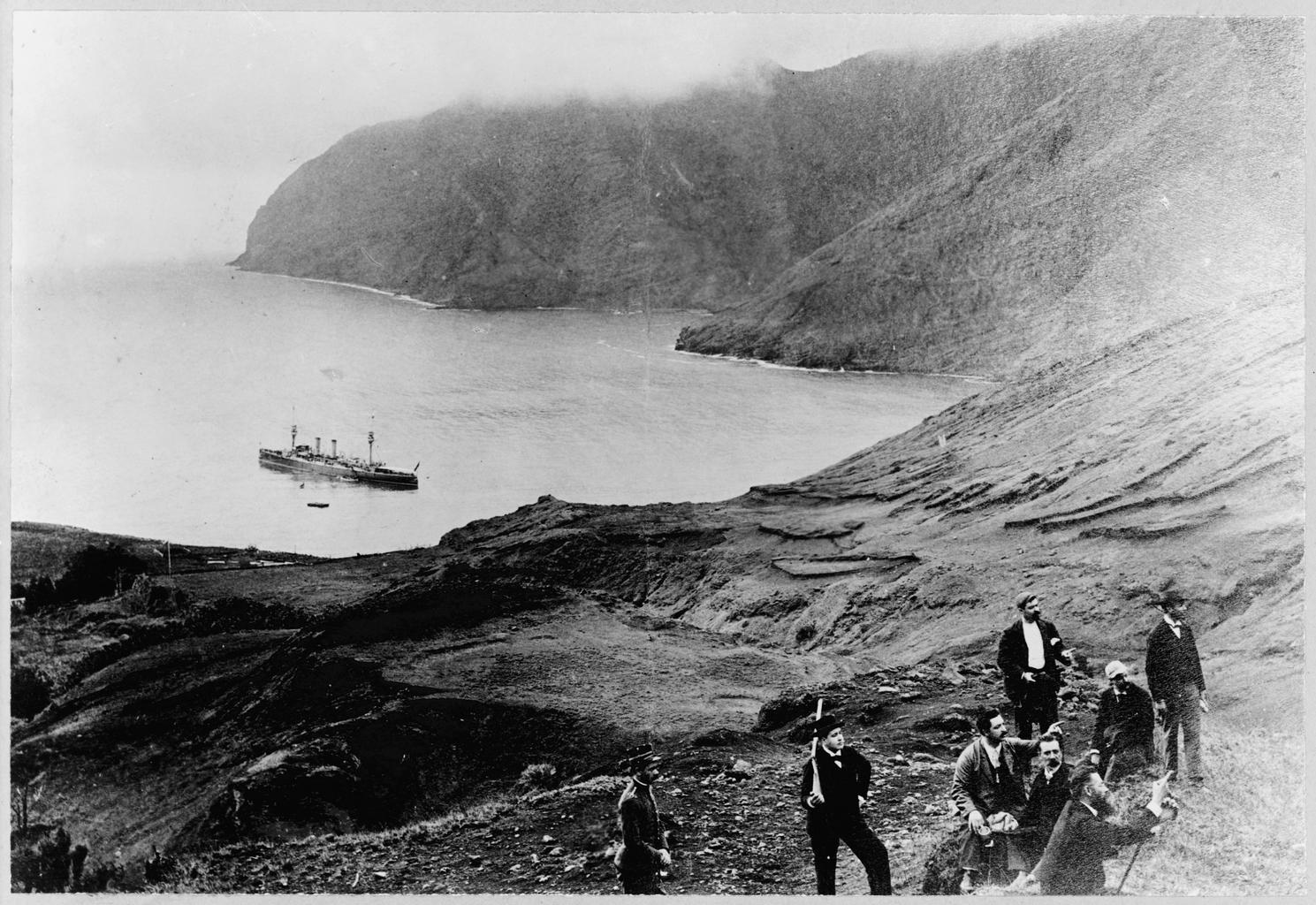
Robinson Crusoe Island, as seen in the late 19th or early 20th century. The ship in Cumberland Bay is the cruiser Esmeralda.

The archipelago was discovered on 22 November 1574, by the Spanish sailor Juan Fernández, who was sailing south between Callao and Valparaíso along a route which he also discovered, hundreds of miles west of the coast of Chile, which avoided the northerly Humboldt current. He called the islands Más Afuera, Más a Tierra, and Santa Clara.

In the 17th and 18th centuries, the islands were used as a hideout for pirates and became the location of a penal colony. It was during this period that Alexander Selkirk became marooned on the islands. In the 1740s, they were visited by Commodore Anson's flotilla during his ill-fated venture to the South Seas. The location of the archipelago was fixed by Alessandro Malaspina in 1790; previous charts had differed on the location. British and American whaling vessels were regular visitors to the islands, starting with the London (Captain Joshua Coffin) in 1795.

During the maritime fur trade era of the early 19th century the islands were a source of fur seal skins, and the Juan Fernández fur seal was nearly driven to extinction. In his book Two Years Before the Mast (Chapter VII), Richard Henry Dana Jr. described the islands as he found them circa 1834. At this time the main island was being used as a penal colony. However, when Dr John Coulter visited it in the early 1840s, he reported the island deserted after the approximately 1000 convicts had risen up, killing the soldiers and Governor who had held them captive. The prisoners fled to mainland Chile, where "great numbers" were later hunted down and shot. The story appears in Coulter's book Adventures in the Pacific (1845). On 6 May 1846, a ship carrying Mormon missionaries visited the archipelago, re-stocking before travelling onward. During their stop, they buried the body of a pregnant woman, Laura Goodwin, who had died during a storm.

In 1908, the islands were visited by the Swedish Magellanic Expedition and Carl Skottsberg is believed to have been the last to have seen the Santalum fernandezianum tree alive.

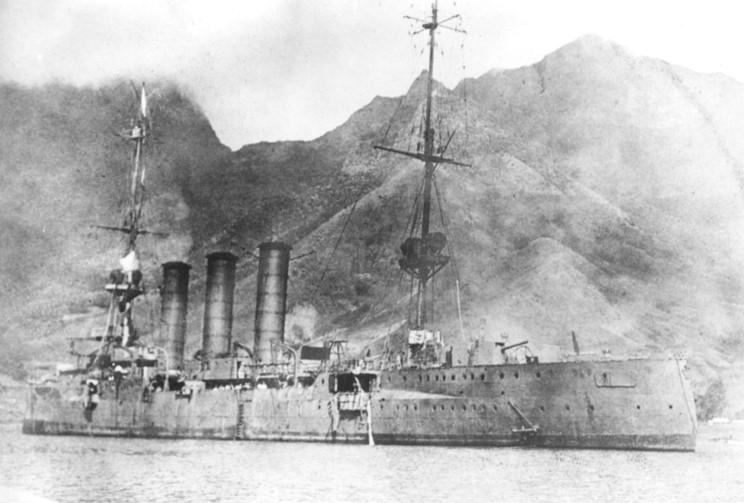
SMS Dresden in March 1915, shortly before its scuttling in Cumberland Bay

Late in 1914 the islands were the rendezvous for Admiral Maximilian von Spee's East Asia Squadron as he gathered his ships together before defeating the British under Admiral Christopher Cradock at the Battle of Coronel. Following the Royal Navy's win at the Battle of the Falkland Islands a month later, the only surviving German cruiser, SMS Dresden, was hunted down and cornered illegally at Más a Tierra early in 1915, although she was in Chilean territorial waters, where it was scuttled after a brief battle with British cruisers.

In 1966 the Chilean government renamed Más Afuera as Alejandro Selkirk Island and Más a Tierra as Robinson Crusoe Island, in order to promote tourism. Incidentally, Selkirk never set foot on Más Afuera, only on Más a Tierra. On 30 July 2007, a constitutional reform gave the Juan Fernández Islands and Easter Island the status of "special territories" of Chile. Pending the enactment of a charter the archipelago will continue to be governed as a commune of the Valparaíso Region.

On 27 February 2010, a tsunami following the 8.8 magnitude earthquake off Maule, Chile struck the islands causing at least 8 deaths. Eleven people were reported as missing. Some early reports described the tsunami as being 40 m (130 ft) high, but later reports measured it at 3 m (10 ft). Most of the town of San Juan Bautista on Robinson Crusoe Island was destroyed.

== Government ==
As a commune, the Juan Fernández Islands are part of the Juan Fernández commune, a third-level administrative division of Chile governed by a municipal council, headed by a mayor (Spanish: alcalde) who is directly elected every four years. The mayor for the term 2021–2024 was Pablo Andrés Manríquez Angulo.

== Women's rights ==
Advocacy for women in the islands is led by the Juan Fernandez Women's Group.

== Religion ==
The Church of Jesus Christ of Latter-day Saints was established in the islands in the 1980s.

== Travel ==
The islands are served by Robinson Crusoe Airfield, located on Robinson Crusoe Island.

== See also ==
- Endemic fauna of the Juan Fernández Islands
- Endemic flora of the Juan Fernández Islands
- Flora of the Juan Fernández Islands
