= Juan Fernández (explorer) =

Spanish explorer and navigator in the Pacific (1536–1604)

- Born: c. 1536; Cartagena (Crown of Castile)
- Died: c. 1604; Santiago (Spanish Empire)
- Occupations: Explorer, navigator

Juan Fernández (c. 1536 – c. 1604) was a Spanish explorer and navigator in the Pacific regions of the Viceroyalty of Peru and Captaincy General of Chile west of colonial South America. He is best known for the discovery of a fast maritime route from Callao (Peru) to Valparaíso (Chile) as well as for the discovery of the Juan Fernández Islands off the coast of Chile.

== Discoveries and theories ==
=== Juan Fernández Islands ===
In 1574, he discovered an alternative maritime route from Callao to Valparaíso, much faster than the old route which bordered the coastline. By taking a detour west from the coast, he managed to avoid the northerly Humboldt Current which used to slow down ships sailing south along the coast. In doing so, he discovered the Juan Fernández Islands archipelago, located west of present-day Valparaíso in the southeastern Pacific Ocean, on 22 November 1574. He also discovered the Pacific islands of San Félix and San Ambrosio in 1574. The speed with which this discovery allowed him to complete the voyage led to him being brought in front of the Inquisition in Peru, and was the reason he became known as el brujo del Pacífico or "the witch of the Pacific".

=== Terra Australis ===
In 1575 the governor of Cuyo, Juan Jufré, organized an expedition to Terra Australis under the command of Juan Fernandez. The expedition was authorized by the governor of Chile but not the Viceroy of Peru. As a result, Jufré changed the official itinerary and pretended his expedition would only sail to the islands discovered by Fernández in 1574. In fact, the real destination of the expedition was still Terra Australis. Soon Juan Fernandez set sail from Valparaíso. After heading west for one month along the 40th parallel south, in the spring of 1576 they arrived in an island described as "mountainous, fertile, with strong-flowing rivers, inhabited by white peoples, and with all the fruits necessary to live".

Later, the expedition set sail for Chile and Juan Fernández wished to convey his discovery to government officials. However, Juan Jufré refused. He requested that the discovery be kept a secret as the expedition had not been authorized by the Viceroy of Peru. Later, after Jufré's death in 1578, Fernández finally shared the discovery with the authorities and tried to convince them of the need to return to the islands and establish a colony. The idea was scrapped due to lack of interest. A record exists in the Spanish Admiralty libraries which describes this discovery. It was reviewed in the 19th century by the Chilean bibliographer José Toribio Medina who is one of the main sources for the claim in South American literature. A transcription of the record in question is included in an appendix to Medina's book. It is a memorandum from one Dr. Arias to the King of Spain in 1621, which requested funds to convert the natives of the lands of Terra Australis. The document is primarily concerned with theoretical reasons as to why such a continent must exist, and uses the supposed discoveries of Juan Fernández to bolster his theories. Medina's own opinion on the subject is that it is more likely that the islands which Fernández landed on are those of Tahiti:

'nos parece ... se descubrieron algunas islas, entra ellas la Nueva Zelandia, o más probablemente, a nuestra ententer, las islas de Tahiti' ('it appears to us ... he discovered some islands, among others those of New Zealand, or more probably, by our understanding, the islands of Tahiti').

— José Toribio Medina, El piloto Juan Fernández, p. 169

Mainstream historians do not accept these claims. University of Auckland history professor James Belich said that similar claims that the French and Chinese discovered New Zealand prior to Abel Tasman in 1642 have also been put forward. "I think there are a number of theories of this kind and all are highly unlikely". New Zealand film maker Winston Cowie's books Conquistador Puzzle Trail (2015) and Nueva Zelanda, un puzzle histórico: tras la pista de los conquistadores españoles (2016), published with the support of the Embassy of Spain to New Zealand, propose that the Ruamahunga skull and oral tradition may support the theory, with more evidence required to take it from possibility to probability.

== See also ==
- Theory of the Portuguese discovery of Australia
- Cristóvão de Mendonça
- Explorers of the Pacific
- Explorers of Oceania
