= Valparaíso Province =

Valparaíso Province Provincia de Valparaíso
- Province
- Seal Location in Chile
- Coordinates: 33°02′S 71°33′W
- Country: Chile
- Region: Valparaíso
- Named for: Valparaíso de Arriba, Spain
- Capital: Valparaíso
- Communes: List of 7: Valparaíso; Viña del Mar; Concón; Quintero; Puchuncaví; Casablanca; Juan Fernández

Government
  - Type: Provincial
  - Presidential Provincial Delegate: None

Area
  - Total: 2,146.6 km^{2} (828.8 sq mi)
  - Rank: 4

Population (2012 Census)
  - Total: 713,065
  - Rank: 1
  - Density: 332.18/km^{2} (860.35/sq mi)
  - Urban: 639,255
  - Rural: 12,566

Sex
  - Men: 315,785
  - Women: 336,036
- Time zone: UTC-4 (CLT)
  - Summer (DST): UTC-3 (CLST)
- Area code: country 56 + area 32
- Website: Governorate of Valparaíso

Valparaíso Province (Spanish: Provincia de Valparaíso) is one of eight provinces of the central Chilean region of Valparaíso (V). Its capital is the coastal city of Valparaíso (pop. 275,982).

== Administration ==
As a province, Valparaíso is a second-level administrative division, it was governed by a provincial governor who was appointed by the president. Since 2021, however, it is directly governed by a regional presidential delegate, also appointed by the President, because one of its communes is the regional capital.

=== Communes ===
The province comprises seven communes (Spanish: comunas), each governed by a municipality consisting of an alcalde and municipal council:

- Valparaíso
- Viña del Mar
- Concón
- Quintero
- Puchuncaví
- Casablanca
- Juan Fernández

== History ==
The province was created on 1 January 1976. On March 11, 2010, the communes of Quilpué and Villa Alemana were transferred to Marga Marga Province under Law 20,368 (signed August 25, 2009).

== Geography and demography ==
The province spans a coastal area of 2,146.6 km^{2} (829 sq mi), the fourth largest in the Valparaíso Region. According to the 2002 census, Valparaíso was the most populous province in the region with a population of 651,821. At that time, there were 639,255 people living in urban areas, 12,566 people living in rural areas, 315,785 men and 336,036 women.
