= Antarctic floristic kingdom =

Geographic area with a relatively uniform composition of plant species in the Antarctic

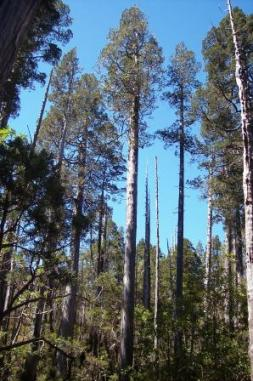
Fitzroya cupressoides, Chiloé Island

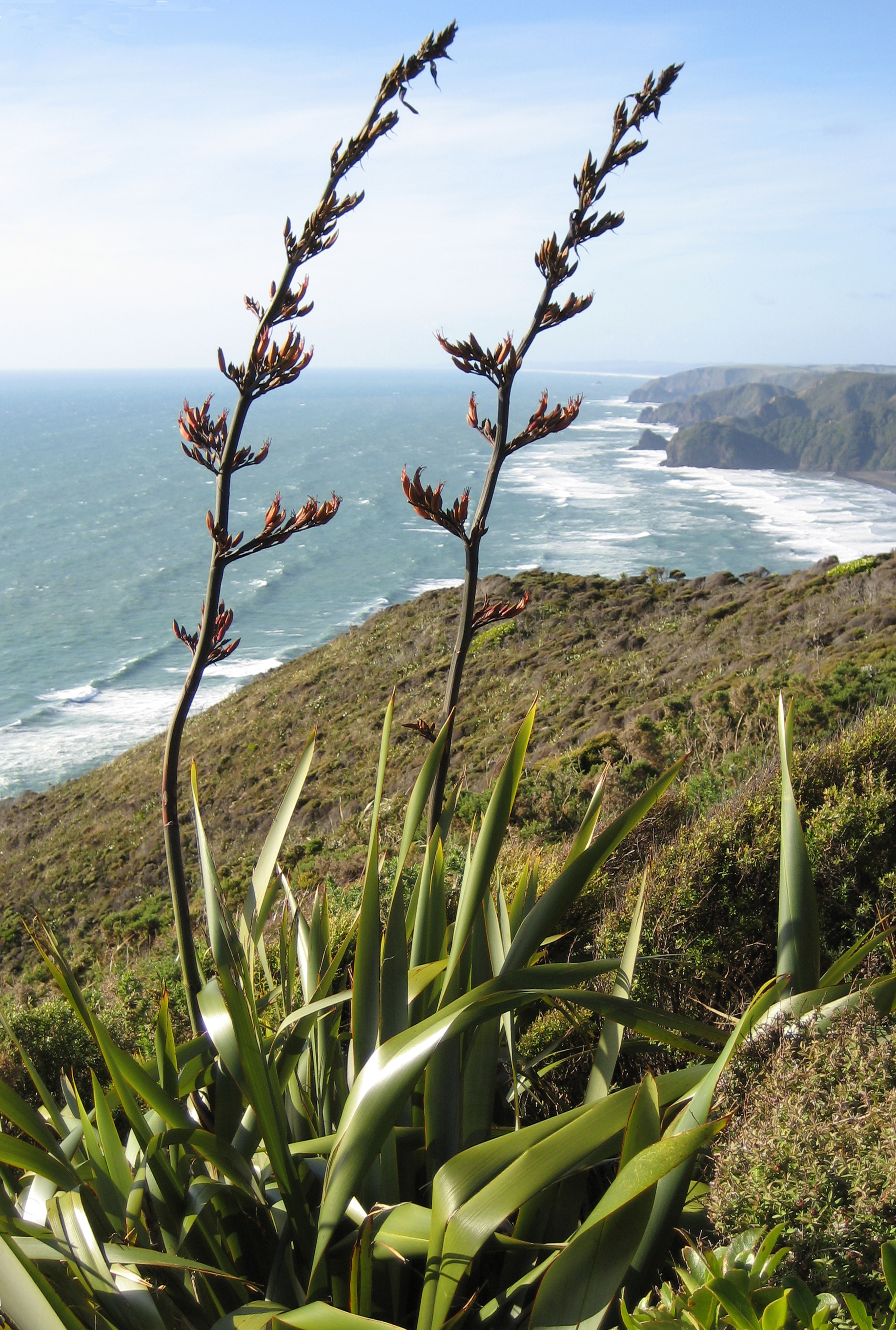
Phormium tenax, Piha, New Zealand

The Antarctic floristic kingdom, also the Holantarctic kingdom, is a floristic kingdom that includes most areas of the world south of 40°S latitude. It was first identified by botanist Ronald Good, and later by Armen Takhtajan. The Antarctic Floristic Kingdom is a classification in phytogeography, different from the Antarctic realm classification in biogeography, and from Antarctic flora genera/species classifications in botany.

== Geography ==
The Antarctic kingdom includes the continent of Antarctica, Patagonia, most of New Zealand, and all islands of the Southern Ocean south of 40°S latitude, including Gough Island, the Kerguelen Islands, and the Falkland Islands. While similar flora can be found in the Australian states of Victoria and Tasmania, the majority of their plant species are more closely related to those found in the Australian Floristic Kingdom.

== Flora ==
The flora of the Antarctic kingdom dates back to the time of Gondwana, the southern supercontinent which once included most of the landmasses of the present-day Southern Hemisphere, though it has been influenced by the flora of the Holarctic kingdom since the Tertiary period. Ronald Good noted, as had Joseph Dalton Hooker much earlier, that many plant species of Antarctica, temperate South America and New Zealand were very closely related, despite their disjunction by the vast Southern Ocean.

According to Ronald Good, about 50 genera of vascular plants are common in the Antarctic floristic kingdom, including Nothofagus and Dicksonia. Takhtajan also made note of hundreds of other vascular plant genera scattered and isolated on islands of the Southern Ocean, including Calandrinia feltonii of the Falkland Islands, Pringlea antiscorbutica of the Kerguelen Islands, and the megaherb genera of the New Zealand Subantarctic Islands.

According to Takhtajan, the following families are endemic or subendemic to this kingdom: Thyrsopteridaceae, Lactoridaceae, Gomortegaceae, Hectorellaceae (Hectorella), Halophytaceae, Malesherbiaceae, Francoaceae, Aextoxicaceae, Vivianiaceae, Misodendraceae, Tribelaceae, Griseliniaceae and Alseuosmiaceae.

== Subdivisions ==
The Antarctic kingdom is subdivided into four floristic regions, and subdivided even further into sixteen floristic provinces. Most of the provinces lie within, or very near the Antarctic Convergence zone.

=== Floristic regions ===
The floristic regions in the Antarctic floristic kingdom are the:

- Fernandezian region
- Argentina-Chile-Patagonian region
- South Subantarctic Islands region
- Neozeylandic region

==== Fernandezian region ====
The Fernandezian region is often also included within the Neotropical kingdom. It includes the Juan Fernández Islands and Desventuradas Islands archipelagoes off the west coast of Chile.

- Endemic family: Lactoridaceae.
- Endemic genera: 20, including Thyrsopteris, Nothomyrcia, Selkirkia, Cuminia, Juania, Robinsonia, Rhetinodendron, Symphyochaeta, Centaurodendron, Yunquea, Hesperogreigia, Podophorus, Pantathera and Megalachne.
- Species endemism of vascular plants is very high (about 70%).
- Provinces

Juan Fernández province

==== Argentina–Chile–Patagonian region ====
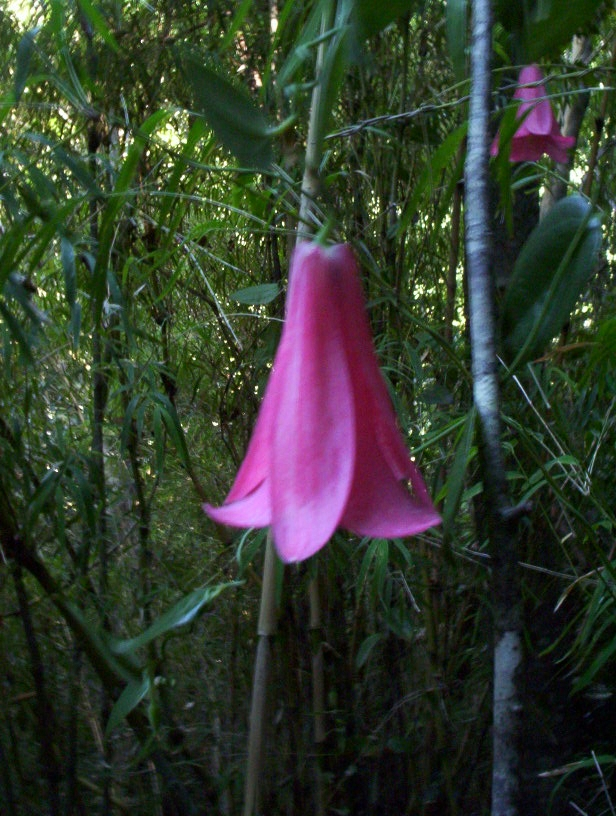
Lapageria rosea, in Chile.

Within southern South America, in regions of Chile and Argentina.

- Endemic families: Gomortegaceae, Halophytaceae, Malesherbiaceae, Tribelaceae, Francoaceae, Aextoxicaceae, Misodendraceae.
- Endemic genera: many, including Leptocionium, Saxegothaea, Austrocedrus, Pilgerodendron, Fitzroya, Peumus, Boquila, Lardizabala, Philippiella, Austrocactus, Holmbergia, Berberidopsis, Niederleinia, Lebetanthus, Ovidia, Quillaja, Kageneckia, Saxifragella, Zuccagnia, Tepualia, Tropaeolum, Gymnophyton, Laretia, Mulinum, Talguenea, Schizanthus, Melosperma, Monttea, Hygea, Mitraria, Sarmienta, Chiliotrichum, Melalema, Nassauvia, Tetroncium, Gilliesia, Leontochir, Leucocryne, Schickendantziella, Solaria, Lapageria, Conanthera, Tecophilaea, Tapeinia, Fascicularia, Ortachne, Jubaea
- Endemic species: many.
- Provinces

Northern Chilean province
Central Chilean province
Argentine Pampas province
Patagonian province
Tierra del Fuego province

==== Neozeylandic Region ====
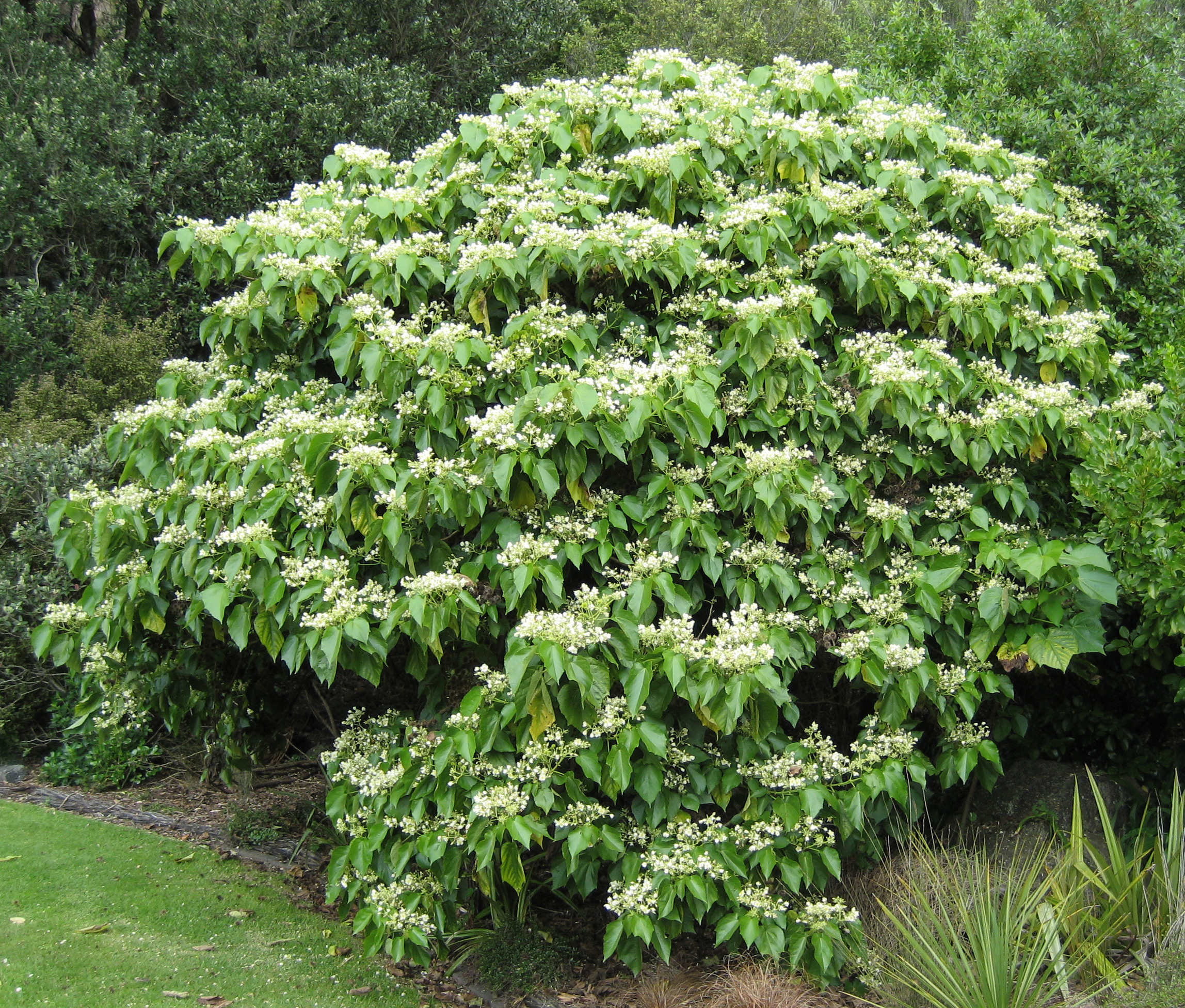
Entelea arborescens, Auckland, New Zealand

The greater New Zealand islands region, including: the Zealandia islands (e.g. North Island, South Island), the New Zealand outlying islands, and the New Zealand Subantarctic Islands.

- Endemic family: Ixerbaceae an endemic monogeneric family of one species, Ixerba brexioides. The only endemic New Zealand vascular plant family.
- Endemic genera: 50, including Loxsoma, Pseudowintera, Hectorella, Entelea, Hoheria, Corokia, Alseuosmia, Carmichaelia, Lophomyrtus, Neomyrtus, Plectomirtha, Stilbocarpa, Kirkophytum, Coxella, Lignocarpa, Scandia, Dactylanthus, Myosotidium, Parahebe, Negria, Rhabdothamnus, Teucridium, Oreostylidium, Pachystegia, Haastia, Leucogenes, Phormium, Rhopalostylis, Lepidorrhachis, Hedyscepe, Howea, Sporadanthus, Aporostylis, Desmoschoenus),
- Endemic species: very high species endemism, especially among Pinophyta.
- Provinces

Lord Howe province
Norfolkian province
Kermadecian province
Northern Neozeylandic province
Central Neozeylandic province
Southern Neozeylandic province
Chatham province
New Zealand Subantarctic Islands province

==== South Subantarctic Islands region ====
The South Subantarctic Islands

- Endemic species: Lyallia kerguelensis, Pringlea antiscorbutica

Tristan–Gough province
Kerguelen province

== See also ==
- Antarctic flora
- Antarctic realm
- Flora of Antarctica (category link)
- List of Antarctic and subantarctic islands
