= Fernandezian region =

Floristic region in Chile

The Fernandezian region is a floristic region which includes two island groups, the Juan Fernández Islands and Desventuradas Islands archipelagos, that lie in the South Pacific Ocean off the west coast of Chile. It is in the Antarctic floristic kingdom, but often also included within the Neotropical kingdom. It is noted for its high degree of endemism and unique evolutionary lineages, making it a key area for the study of island biogeography and plant evolution.

== Species ==
The region's flora is influenced by both South American and Pacific elements, with a notable proportion of endemic species, including the tree Juania australis and several species of Robinsonia, a genus of flowering plants exclusive to the Juan Fernández Islands. Although relatively small in area, its isolation has led to the development of plant communities that are not found elsewhere, similar in ecological structure to other Pacific island groups such as the Galápagos and the Tristan da Cunha islands.

Plant genera endemic to the Juan Fernández Islands include Centaurodendron, Cuminia, Juania, Lactoris, Megalachne, Nothomyrcia, Robinsonia, Thyrsopteris, and Yunquea, with many endemic animal genera are found here too. The humid subtropical climate and volcanic soils provide suitable conditions for laurel forests, ferns, and mosses, forming distinctive ecosystems unlike those on the mainland.

Due to ecological sensitivity and limited range, many species in the region are threatened by invasive species, human activity, and climate change, prompting conservation efforts focused on habitat restoration and invasive species control.
