= Robinsonia =

Robinsonia is the scientific name of two genera of organisms and may refer to:

- Robinsonia (moth), a genus of moths in the family Erebidae
- Robinsonia (plant), a genus of plants in the family Asteraceae
