= Philippiella =

Philippiella may refer to:

- Philippiella (ostracod), a genus of ostracods in the family Cylindroleberididae
- Philippiella (plant), a genus of plants in the family Caryophyllaceae
- Philippiella, a genus of algae in the family Chordariaceae, synonym of Elachista
- Philippiella, a genus of bivalves in the family Philobryidae, synonym of Philobrya
- Philippiella, a fossil genus of bivalves in the family Terquemiidae, synonym of Newaagia
