= Antarctic realm =

One of Earth's eight biogeographic realms

Coordinates: 90°00′S 0°00′W

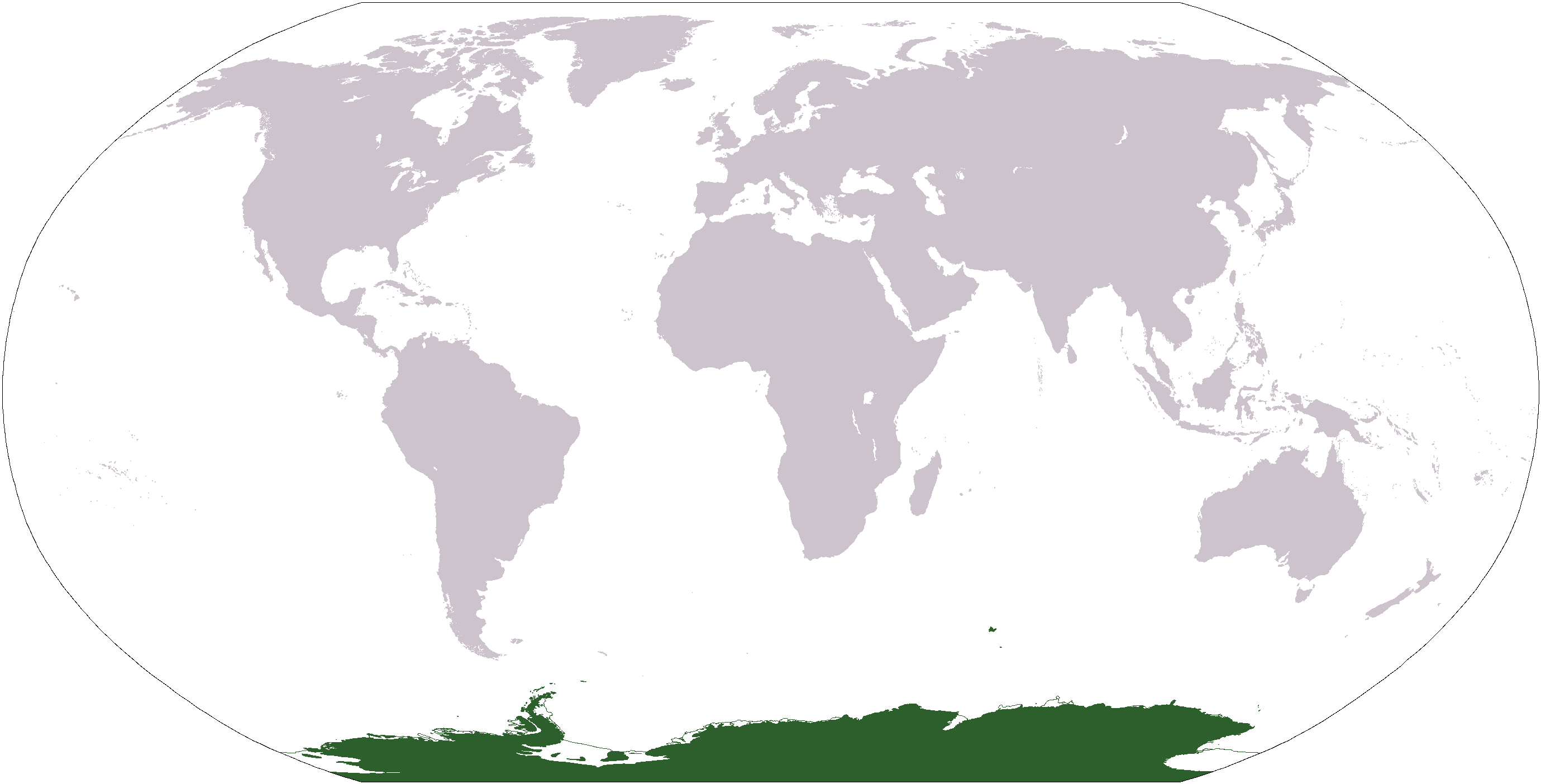
The Antarctic realm (in green)

The Antarctic realm is one of eight terrestrial biogeographic realms. The ecosystem includes Antarctica and several island groups in the southern Atlantic and Indian oceans. The continent of Antarctica is so cold that it has supported only two vascular plants for millions of years, and its flora presently consists of around 250 lichens, 100 mosses, 25–30 liverworts, and around 700 terrestrial and aquatic algal species, which live on the areas of exposed rock and soil around the shore of the continent. Antarctica's two flowering plant species, the Antarctic hair grass (Deschampsia antarctica) and Antarctic pearlwort (Colobanthus quitensis), are found on the northern and western parts of the Antarctic Peninsula. Antarctica is also home to a diversity of animal life, including penguins, seals, and whales.

Several Antarctic and sub-Antarctic island groups are considered part of the Antarctic realm, including Bouvet Island, the Crozet Islands, Heard Island, the Kerguelen Islands, the McDonald Islands, the Prince Edward Islands, the South Georgia Group, the South Orkney Islands, the South Sandwich Islands, and the South Shetland Islands. These islands have a somewhat milder climate than Antarctica proper, and support a greater diversity of tundra plants, although they are all too windy and cold to support trees.

Antarctic krill is the keystone species of the ecosystem of the Southern Ocean, and is an important food organism for whales, seals, leopard seals, fur seals, crabeater seals, squid, icefish, penguins, albatrosses and many other birds. The ocean there is so full of phytoplankton because water rises from the depths to the light-flooded surface, bringing nutrients from all oceans back to the photic zone.

On August 20, 2014, scientists confirmed the existence of microorganisms living 800 metres (2,600 feet) below the ice of Antarctica.

== History ==
Millions of years ago, Antarctica was warmer and wetter, and supported the Antarctic flora, including forests of podocarps and southern beech. Antarctica was also part of the ancient supercontinent of Gondwanaland, which gradually broke up by continental drift starting 110 million years ago. The separation of South America from Antarctica 30–35 million years ago allowed the Antarctic Circumpolar Current to form, which isolated Antarctica climatically and caused it to become much colder. The Antarctic flora subsequently died out in Antarctica, but is still an important component of the flora of southern Neotropical (Latin America and the Caribbean) and Australasian realms, which were also former parts of Gondwana.

Some botanists recognize an Antarctic Floristic Kingdom that includes Antarctica, New Zealand, and parts of Temperate South America where the Antarctic Flora is still a major component.

== Ecoregions ==
The Antarctic realm is divided into 18 tundra ecoregions:

Antarctic tundra
Adelie Land tundra	Adélie Land
Central South Antarctic Peninsula tundra	Antarctic Peninsula
Dronning Maud Land tundra	Queen Maud Land
East Antarctic tundra	Eastern Antarctica
Ellsworth Land tundra	Ellsworth Land
Ellsworth Mountains tundra	Ellsworth Mountains
Enderby Land tundra	Enderby Land
Marie Byrd Land tundra	Marie Byrd Land
North Victoria Land tundra	Victoria Land
Northeast Antarctic Peninsula tundra	Antarctic Peninsula
Northwest Antarctic Peninsula tundra	Antarctic Peninsula
Prince Charles Mountains tundra	Prince Charles Mountains
Scotia Sea Islands tundra	South Georgia and the South Sandwich Islands, South Shetland Islands, Bouvet Island
South Antarctic Peninsula tundra	Antarctic Peninsula
South Orkney Islands tundra	South Orkney Islands
South Victoria Land tundra	Victoria Land
Southern Indian Ocean Islands tundra	Crozet Islands, Prince Edward Islands, Heard Island, Kerguelen Islands, McDonald Islands
Transantarctic Mountains tundra	Transantarctic Mountains

== See also ==
- Antarctic microorganism
- Wildlife of Antarctica

== Bibliography ==
- Terauds, A; Chown, SL; Morgan, F; Peat, HJ; Watts, D; et al. (2012). "Conservation biogeography of the Antarctic". Diversity and Distributions. 18 (7): 726–741. doi:10.1111/j.1472-4642.2012.00925.x. hdl:10019.1/120035.
- Life in the Freezer, a BBC television series on life on and around Antarctica
- Biodiversity at Ardley Island, South Shetland archipelago, Antarctica
- Deep Sea Foraminifera – Deep Sea Foraminifera from 4400m depth, Weddell Sea – an image gallery of hundreds of specimens and description
- Aliens in Antarctica; Visitors carry unwelcome species into a once pristine environment May 5, 2012 Science News
