= Ingenhouzia =

Ingenhouzia is a taxon synonym which may refer to:

- Ingenhouzia Bertero ex DC., a synonym of Robinsonia (plant) DC.
- Ingenhouzia Moc. & Sessé ex DC., a synonym of Gossypium L.
