= Robinsonia flavomarginata =

Scientific classification
- Domain: Eukaryota
- Kingdom: Animalia
- Phylum: Arthropoda
- Class: Insecta
- Order: Lepidoptera
- Superfamily: Noctuoidea
- Family: Erebidae
- Subfamily: Arctiinae
- Genus: Robinsonia
- Species: R. flavomarginata

Binomial name
- Robinsonia flavomarginata H. Druce, 1899

Species of moth

Robinsonia flavomarginata is a moth in the family Erebidae. It was described by Herbert Druce in 1899. It is found in Colombia and the Amazon region.
