= Robinsonia lefaivrei =

Scientific classification
- Domain: Eukaryota
- Kingdom: Animalia
- Phylum: Arthropoda
- Class: Insecta
- Order: Lepidoptera
- Superfamily: Noctuoidea
- Family: Erebidae
- Subfamily: Arctiinae
- Genus: Robinsonia
- Species: R. lefaivrei

Binomial name
- Robinsonia lefaivrei Schaus, 1895

Species of moth

Robinsonia lefaivrei is a moth in the family Erebidae. It was described by William Schaus in 1895. It is found in Brazil.
