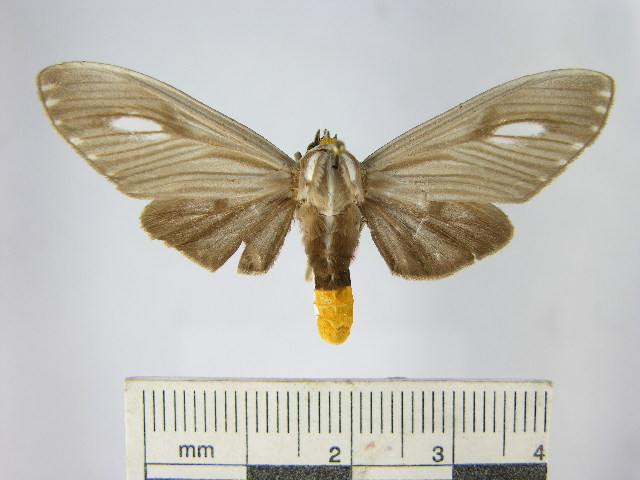

Scientific classification
- Domain: Eukaryota
- Kingdom: Animalia
- Phylum: Arthropoda
- Class: Insecta
- Order: Lepidoptera
- Superfamily: Noctuoidea
- Family: Erebidae
- Subfamily: Arctiinae
- Genus: Robinsonia
- Species: R. mera

Binomial name
- Robinsonia mera (Schaus, 1910)

Synonyms
- Phaeomolis mera Schaus, 1910

= Robinsonia mera =

Species of moth

Robinsonia mera is a moth in the family Erebidae. It was described by William Schaus in 1910. It is found in Costa Rica.
