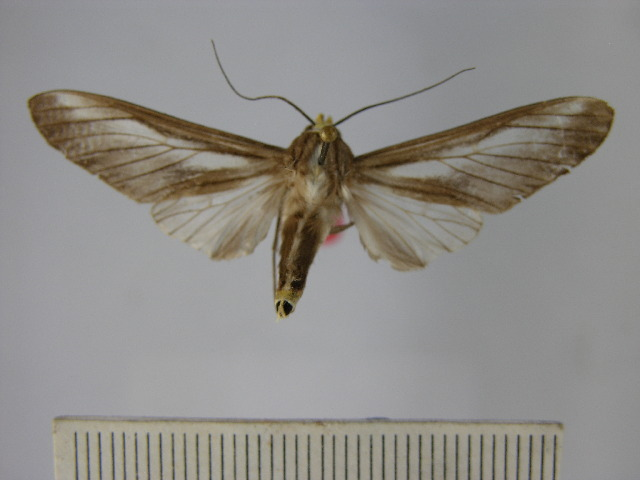

Scientific classification
- Domain: Eukaryota
- Kingdom: Animalia
- Phylum: Arthropoda
- Class: Insecta
- Order: Lepidoptera
- Superfamily: Noctuoidea
- Family: Erebidae
- Subfamily: Arctiinae
- Genus: Robinsonia
- Species: R. morula

Binomial name
- Robinsonia morula H. Druce, 1906

= Robinsonia morula =

Species of moth

Robinsonia morula is a moth in the family Erebidae. It was described by Herbert Druce in 1906. It is found in French Guiana, Amazonas and Peru.
