= Robinsonia punctata =

Scientific classification
- Kingdom: Animalia
- Phylum: Arthropoda
- Class: Insecta
- Order: Lepidoptera
- Superfamily: Noctuoidea
- Family: Erebidae
- Subfamily: Arctiinae
- Genus: Robinsonia
- Species: R. punctata

Binomial name
- Robinsonia punctata Rothschild, 1909

Synonyms
- Robinsonia punctata f. incompletta Gaede, 1928

Species of moth

Robinsonia punctata is a moth in the family Erebidae. It was described by Walter Rothschild in 1909. It is found in Mexico.

The forewings are brown with a large diamond-shaped silvery-white patch in the submedian interspace. There is a second large oval patch extending from just inside the apex of the cell to the apex. The hindwings are silvery white.
