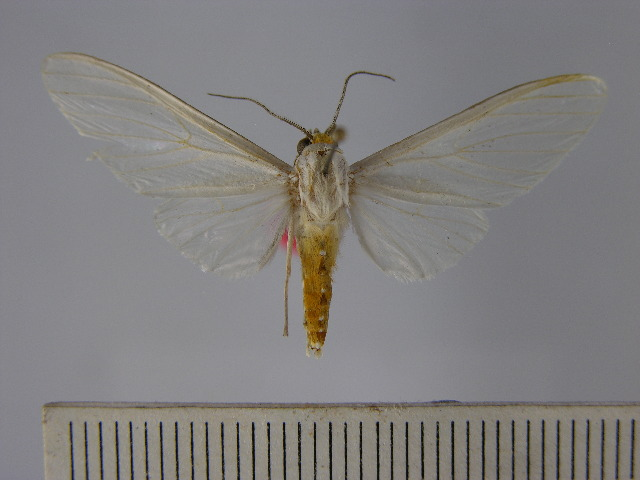

Scientific classification
- Domain: Eukaryota
- Kingdom: Animalia
- Phylum: Arthropoda
- Class: Insecta
- Order: Lepidoptera
- Superfamily: Noctuoidea
- Family: Erebidae
- Subfamily: Arctiinae
- Genus: Robinsonia
- Species: R. cajali

Binomial name
- Robinsonia cajali (C. Hoffmann, 1934)

Synonyms
- Phaemolis cajali C. Hoffmann, 1934

= Robinsonia cajali =

Species of moth

Robinsonia cajali is a moth in the family Erebidae. It was described by Carlos Christian Hoffmann in 1934. It is found in Mexico.
