= Centaurodendron palmiforme =

Conservation status
- Critically Endangered (IUCN 2.3)

Scientific classification
- Kingdom: Plantae
- Clade: Tracheophytes
- Clade: Angiosperms
- Clade: Eudicots
- Clade: Asterids
- Order: Asterales
- Family: Asteraceae
- Genus: Centaurodendron
- Species: C. palmiforme

Binomial name
- Centaurodendron palmiforme Skottsb.

Species of flowering plant

Centaurodendron palmiforme is a species of flowering plant in the family Asteraceae. It is endemic to Robinson Crusoe Island in the Juan Fernández Islands of Chile.
