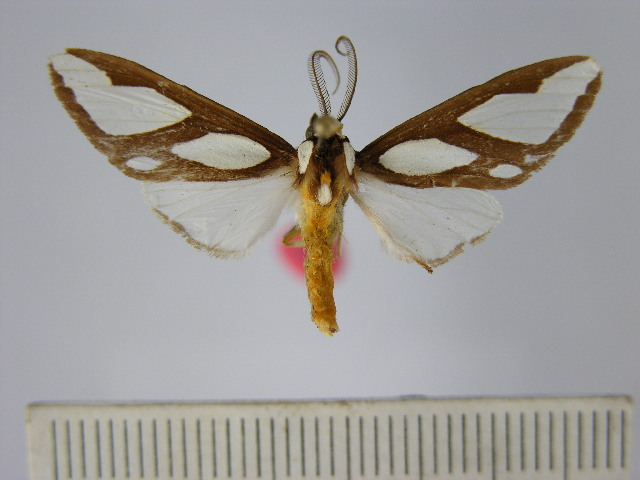

Scientific classification
- Kingdom: Animalia
- Phylum: Arthropoda
- Class: Insecta
- Order: Lepidoptera
- Superfamily: Noctuoidea
- Family: Erebidae
- Subfamily: Arctiinae
- Genus: Robinsonia
- Species: R. formula

Binomial name
- Robinsonia formula Grote, [1866]

= Robinsonia formula =

Species of moth

Robinsonia formula is a moth in the family Erebidae. It was described by Augustus Radcliffe Grote in 1866. It is found on Cuba and the Dominican Republic.
