= Antarctic flora =

Distinct community of plants which evolved on the supercontinent of Gondwana

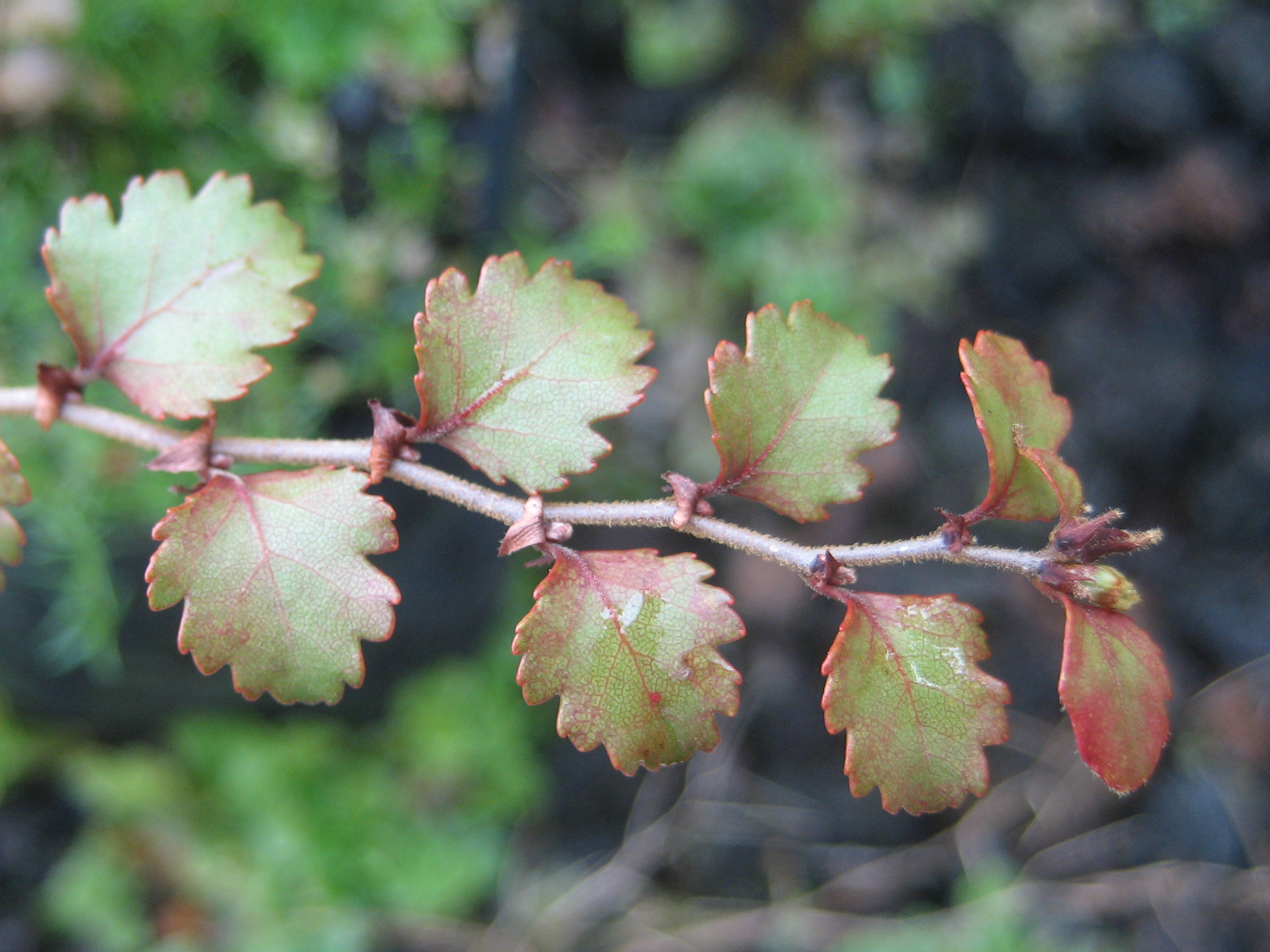
Nothofagus fusca, New Zealand

Antarctic flora are a distinct community of vascular plants which evolved millions of years ago on the supercontinent of Gondwana. As of 2025, species of Antarctica flora resided on several now separated areas of the Southern Hemisphere, including Patagonia, southernmost Africa, New Zealand, Australia, New Caledonia and the mountains of southern Brazil. Joseph Dalton Hooker (1817–1911) was the first to notice similarities in the flora and speculated that Antarctica had served as either a source or a transitional point, and that land masses now separated might formerly have been adjacent.

Based on the similarities in their flora, botanist Ronald D'Oyley Good identified a separate Antarctic Floristic Kingdom that included Patagonia, New Zealand, and some southern island groups. In addition, Australia was determined to be its own floristic kingdom because of the influx of tropical Eurasian flora that had mostly supplanted the Antarctic flora and included New Guinea and New Caledonia in the Paleotropical floristic kingdom, while the Western Cape of South Africa was included in the Cape floristic kingdom.

== Origin ==
Millions of years ago the climate in Antarctica was warmer, and was able to support flora well into the Neogene. This included forests of podocarps and southern beech. Antarctica was also part of the ancient supercontinent of Gondwana, which gradually broke up by plate tectonics starting 110 million years ago. The separation of South America from Antarctica 30–35 million years ago allowed the Antarctic Circumpolar Current to form, which isolated Antarctica climatically and caused it to become much colder. The Antarctic flora subsequently died out, but is still an important component of the flora of southern Neotropic (South America) and Australasian realms, which were also former parts of Gondwana.

Some genera which originated in Antarctic Flora are still recognized as major components of the flora of New Caledonia, Tasmania, Madagascar, India, New Zealand, and southern South America. South America, Madagascar, Africa, India, Australia, New Zealand, and Antarctica were all part of the supercontinent Gondwana, which started to break up in the early Cretaceous period (145–66 million years ago). India was the first to break away, followed by Africa, and then New Zealand, which started to drift north. By the end of the Cretaceous, South America and Australia were still joined to Antarctica. Paleontologist Gilbert Brenner identified the emergence of a distinct southern Gondwanan flora by the late Cretaceous period in the cooler and humid southern hemisphere regions of Australia, southern South America, southern Africa, Antarctica, and New Zealand; it most resembled the flora of modern-day southern New Zealand. A drier northern Gondwanan flora had developed in northern South America and northern Africa.

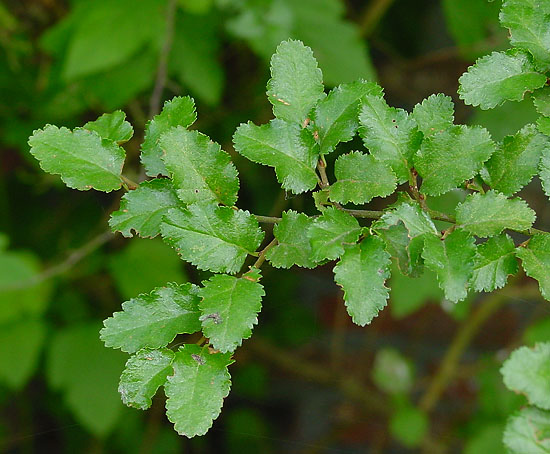
Nothofagus antarctica, Chile and Argentina

Africa and India drifted north into the tropical latitudes, became hotter and drier, and ultimately connected with the Eurasian continent. Today, the flora of Africa and India have few remnants of the Antarctic flora. Australia drifted north and became drier as well; the humid Antarctic flora retreated to the east coast and Tasmania, while the rest of Australia became dominated by Acacia, Eucalyptus, and Casuarina, as well as xeric shrubs and grasses. Humans arrived in Australia 50–60,000 years ago and used fire to reshape the vegetation of the continent; as a result, the Antarctic flora, also known as the Rainforest flora in Australia, retreated to a few isolated areas composing less than 2% of Australia's land area.

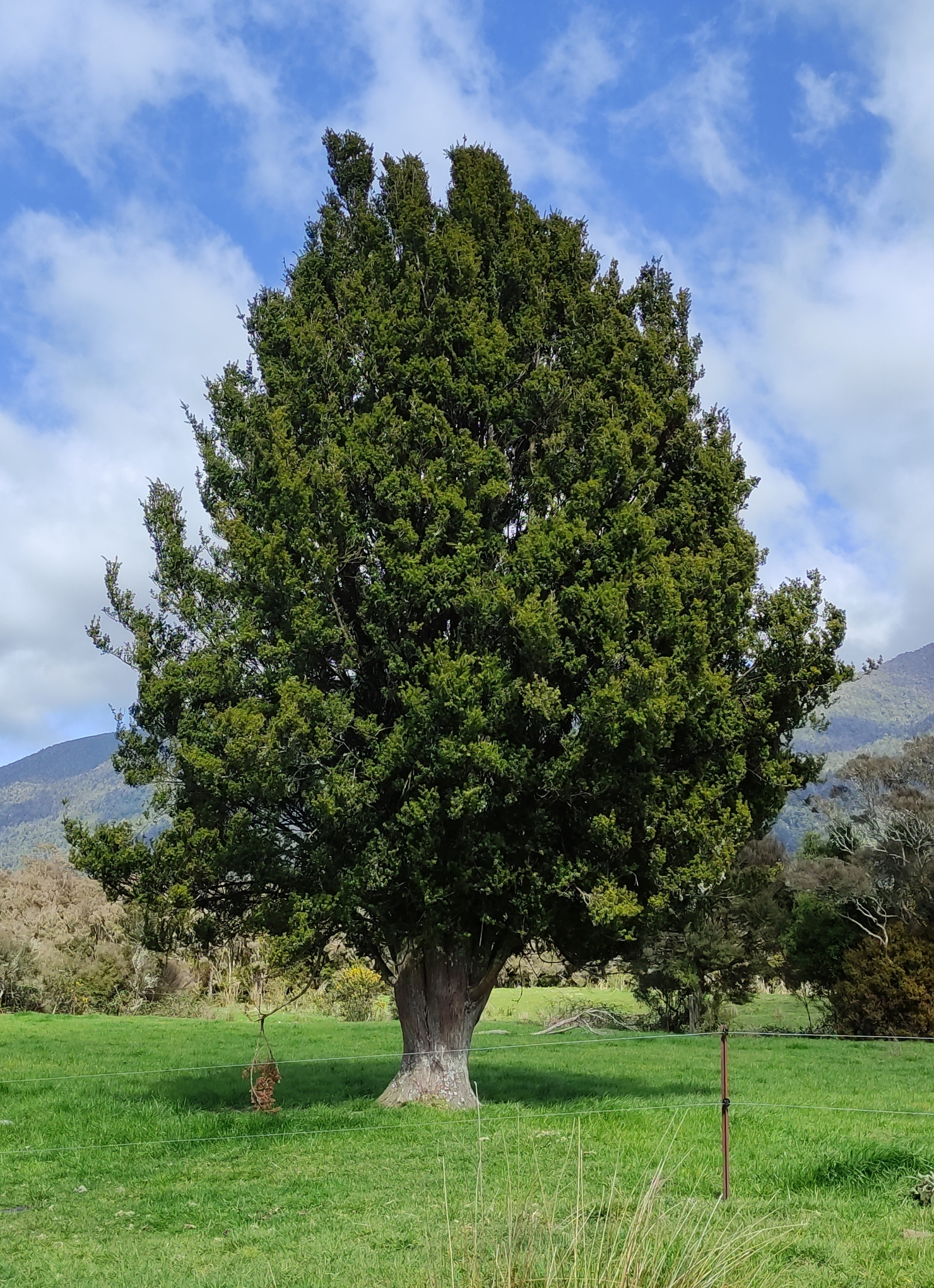
Podocarpus laetus (Hall's tōtara), a species of podocarp from New Zealand

The woody plants of the Antarctic flora include conifers in the families Podocarpaceae, Araucariaceae and the subfamily Callitroideae of Cupressaceae, and angiosperms such as the families Proteaceae, Griseliniaceae, Cunoniaceae, Atherospermataceae, and Winteraceae, and genera like southern beech (Nothofagus) and fuchsia (Fuchsia). Many other families of flowering plants and ferns, including the tree fern Dicksonia, are characteristic of the Antarctic flora.

== Flora of Antarctica ==
=== Antarctic palaeoflora ===
A wide variety of plant life has resided in Antarctica throughout its history. Investigations of Upper Cretaceous and Early Tertiary sediments of Antarctica yield a rich assemblage of well-preserved fossil dicotyledonous angiosperm wood which provides evidence for the existence, since the Late Cretaceous, of temperate forests similar in composition to those found in present-day southern South America, New Zealand and Australia. It is suggested a paleobotanical habitat similar to the extant cool temperate Valdivian rainforests. During the colder Neogene (17–2.5 Ma), a low diversity tundra ecosystem dominated by angiosperms replaced the rainforests.

There are two conifer and at least seven angiosperm morphotypes recorded in the Antarctica palaeoflora. Conifers include Cupressinoxylon, which is the more common, and Podocarpoxylon. The angiosperm component includes two species of Nothofagoxylon, one species of Myrceugenelloxylon (similar to Luma, in the extant family Myrtaceae), and one species of Weinmannioxylon (similar to Eucryphia in the extant family Cunoniaceae). Two other species are assigned to genera Hedycaryoxylon (Monimiaceae) and Atherospermoxylon (Atherospermataceae). A fossil water lily, Notonuphar (similar to Nuphar in the extant family Nympheaceae), was described from Eocene-aged sediments on Seymour Island in 2017.

=== Present-day flora ===
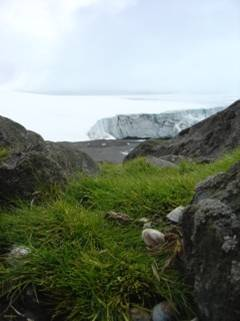
Deschampsia antarctica at Collins Glacier, Antarctica. This species is one of only two flowering plants native to Antarctica, the other one being the Antarctic pearlwort (Colobanthus quitensis).

Antarctica's extant flora presently consists of around 100 mosses, 25–30 liverworts, and around 700 terrestrial and aquatic algal species. In addition, there are around 250 lichens. Species of moss endemic to Antarctica include Schistidium antarctici, Coscinodon lawianus, and Sarconeurum glaciale. Just two native flowering plants, Deschampsia antarctica (Antarctic hair grass) and Colobanthus quitensis (Antarctic pearlwort), are found on the northern and western parts of the Antarctic Peninsula. The continent of Antarctica itself has been too cold and dry to support any other vascular plants for millions of years. The scanty vegetation of Antarctica is a result of the chilling temperature, lack of sunlight, little rainfall, relatively poor soil quality, and a lack of moisture due to the inability of the plants to absorb water in the form of ice. However, with the onset of anthropogenic warming, this "vegetation cover increased from 0.863 kilometers^{2} in 1986 to 11.947 kilometers^{2} in 2021, with an accelerated rate of change in recent years (2016–2021: 0.424 kilometers^{2} per year) relative to the study period (1986–2021: 0.317 km^{2} per year)."

There are also some aquatic moss species, including a few in deep water. One of them, Bryum pseudotriquetrum, grows at water depths of up to 81 m in Radok Lake, and Pohlia wilsonii grows in freshwater lakes in Schirmacher Oasis.

=== Introduced plants ===
In the early 1900s experiments were conducted to see if arctic and alpine species could be grown in Antarctic conditions. The first such experiment was attempted at an Argentine meteorological station in 1905. The botanist Robert Rudmose-Brown sent arctic seeds to be planted at the station, but none of the seeds germinated. When sea kale (Crambe maritima) seeds were planted during the Terra Nova Expedition they sprouted, but did not last long. They were planted in a sheltered area near a stone hut on the south side of Granite Harbor on 10 December 1912. Twelve seeds in total germinated, but only grew one week before dying.

The common weedy hybrid annual meadow grass (Poa annua) was accidentally introduced to areas the South Sandwich Islands before 1953 and the Antarctic islands by 1981. It was found on Galindez Island, just off the coast of the Antarctic Peninsula, and survived several winters. The well known smooth meadow-grass (Poa pratensis) was introduced to Cierva Point on the mainland when Antarctic beech (Nothofagus antarctica) and lenga beech (Nothofagus pumilio) were transplanted from Tierra del Fuego to the Argentine station now named Base Primavera. Though the trees died after a few years, the grass was still healthy in 1995, but not spreading. This small population was finally removed in 2015 and in the same year annual meadow grass was limited to just location near Admiralty Bay in the South Shetland Islands. The other smaller populations in the South Shetlands and the Antarctic Peninsula were removed during the 2009/2010 summer. Though the living populations were successfully removed it is possible that seeds are still present in the soil and may reestablish in the future. Despite eradication efforts the population of annual meadow grass continues to persist at Admiralty Bay in 2023.

== See also ==
- Antarctic Floristic Kingdom
- Antarctic realm
- List of Antarctic and subantarctic islands
- Flora Antarctica
- Flora of Chile
- Flora and fauna of the Kerguelen Islands
- Flora of New Zealand
- Flora of Australia
- Meyer Desert Formation biota
