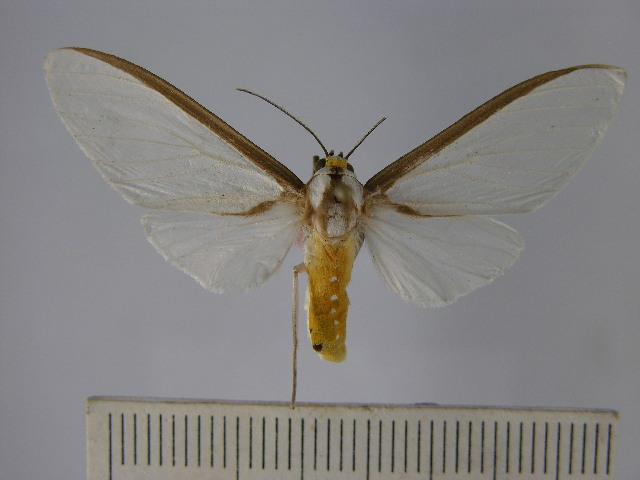

Scientific classification
- Domain: Eukaryota
- Kingdom: Animalia
- Phylum: Arthropoda
- Class: Insecta
- Order: Lepidoptera
- Superfamily: Noctuoidea
- Family: Erebidae
- Subfamily: Arctiinae
- Genus: Robinsonia
- Species: R. sabata

Binomial name
- Robinsonia sabata H. Druce, 1895

= Robinsonia sabata =

Species of moth

Robinsonia sabata is a moth in the family Erebidae. It was described by Herbert Druce in 1895. It is found in Honduras and Belize.
