= Robinsonia mossi =

Scientific classification
- Domain: Eukaryota
- Kingdom: Animalia
- Phylum: Arthropoda
- Class: Insecta
- Order: Lepidoptera
- Superfamily: Noctuoidea
- Family: Erebidae
- Subfamily: Arctiinae
- Genus: Robinsonia
- Species: R. mossi

Binomial name
- Robinsonia mossi (Rothschild, 1922)

Synonyms
- Eupsodosoma mossi Rothschild, 1922

Species of moth

Robinsonia mossi is a moth in the family Erebidae. It was described by Walter Rothschild in 1922. It is found in French Guiana and Brazil.
