= Robinsonia banghaasi =

Scientific classification
- Domain: Eukaryota
- Kingdom: Animalia
- Phylum: Arthropoda
- Class: Insecta
- Order: Lepidoptera
- Superfamily: Noctuoidea
- Family: Erebidae
- Subfamily: Arctiinae
- Genus: Robinsonia
- Species: R. banghaasi

Binomial name
- Robinsonia banghaasi Rothschild, 1911

Species of moth

Robinsonia banghaasi is a moth in the family Erebidae. It was described by Walter Rothschild in 1911. It is found in the Brazilian state of Mato Grosso.
