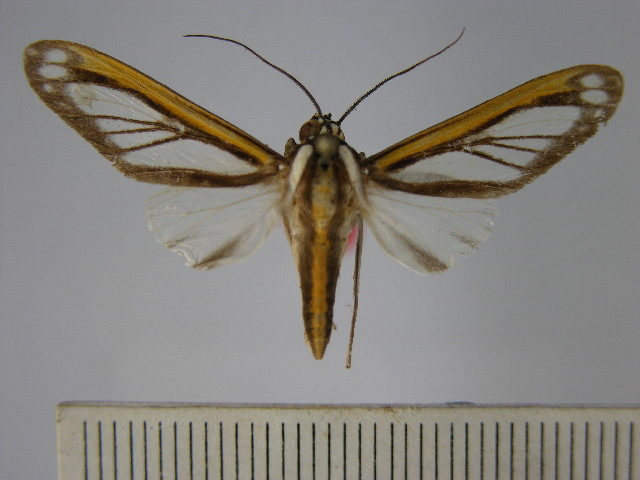

Scientific classification
- Domain: Eukaryota
- Kingdom: Animalia
- Phylum: Arthropoda
- Class: Insecta
- Order: Lepidoptera
- Superfamily: Noctuoidea
- Family: Erebidae
- Subfamily: Arctiinae
- Genus: Robinsonia
- Species: R. rockstonia

Binomial name
- Robinsonia rockstonia Schaus, 1905

= Robinsonia rockstonia =

Species of moth

Robinsonia rockstonia is a moth in the family Erebidae. It was described by William Schaus in 1905. It is found in French Guiana, Guyana and Amazonas.
