= Robinsonia praphoea =

Scientific classification
- Domain: Eukaryota
- Kingdom: Animalia
- Phylum: Arthropoda
- Class: Insecta
- Order: Lepidoptera
- Superfamily: Noctuoidea
- Family: Erebidae
- Subfamily: Arctiinae
- Genus: Robinsonia
- Species: R. praphoea

Binomial name
- Robinsonia praphoea Dognin, 1906

Species of moth

Robinsonia praphoea is a moth in the family Erebidae. It was described by Paul Dognin in 1906. It is found in French Guiana, Amazonas, Venezuela and Peru.
