= Robinsonia willingi =

Scientific classification
- Domain: Eukaryota
- Kingdom: Animalia
- Phylum: Arthropoda
- Class: Insecta
- Order: Lepidoptera
- Superfamily: Noctuoidea
- Family: Erebidae
- Subfamily: Arctiinae
- Genus: Robinsonia
- Species: R. willingi

Binomial name
- Robinsonia willingi Travassos, 1964

Species of moth

Robinsonia willingi is a moth in the family Erebidae. It was described by Travassos in 1964. It is found in Mexico.
