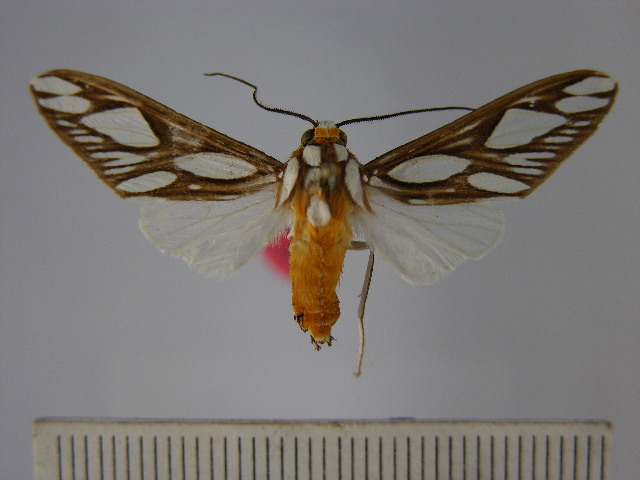

Scientific classification
- Domain: Eukaryota
- Kingdom: Animalia
- Phylum: Arthropoda
- Class: Insecta
- Order: Lepidoptera
- Superfamily: Noctuoidea
- Family: Erebidae
- Subfamily: Arctiinae
- Genus: Robinsonia
- Species: R. polyplagia

Binomial name
- Robinsonia polyplagia Schaus, 1901

Synonyms
- Robinsonia transducens Seitz, 1921

= Robinsonia polyplagia =

Species of moth

Robinsonia polyplagia is a moth in the family Erebidae. It was described by William Schaus in 1901. It is found in Venezuela and Costa Rica.

== Subspecies ==
- Robinsonia polyplagia polyplagia (Venezuela)
- Robinsonia polyplagia transducens Seitz, 1921 (Costa Rica)
