= Robinsonia marginata =

Scientific classification
- Domain: Eukaryota
- Kingdom: Animalia
- Phylum: Arthropoda
- Class: Insecta
- Order: Lepidoptera
- Superfamily: Noctuoidea
- Family: Erebidae
- Subfamily: Arctiinae
- Genus: Robinsonia
- Species: R. marginata

Binomial name
- Robinsonia marginata Rothschild, 1909

Species of moth

Robinsonia marginata is a moth in the family Erebidae. It was described by Walter Rothschild in 1909. It is found in Guyana and French Guiana.
