= Robinsonia catasticta =

Scientific classification
- Kingdom: Animalia
- Phylum: Arthropoda
- Class: Insecta
- Order: Lepidoptera
- Superfamily: Noctuoidea
- Family: Erebidae
- Subfamily: Arctiinae
- Genus: Robinsonia
- Species: R. catasticta

Binomial name
- Robinsonia catasticta Hampson, 1916

Species of moth

Robinsonia catasticta is a moth in the family Erebidae. It was described by George Hampson in 1916. It is found in Peru.
