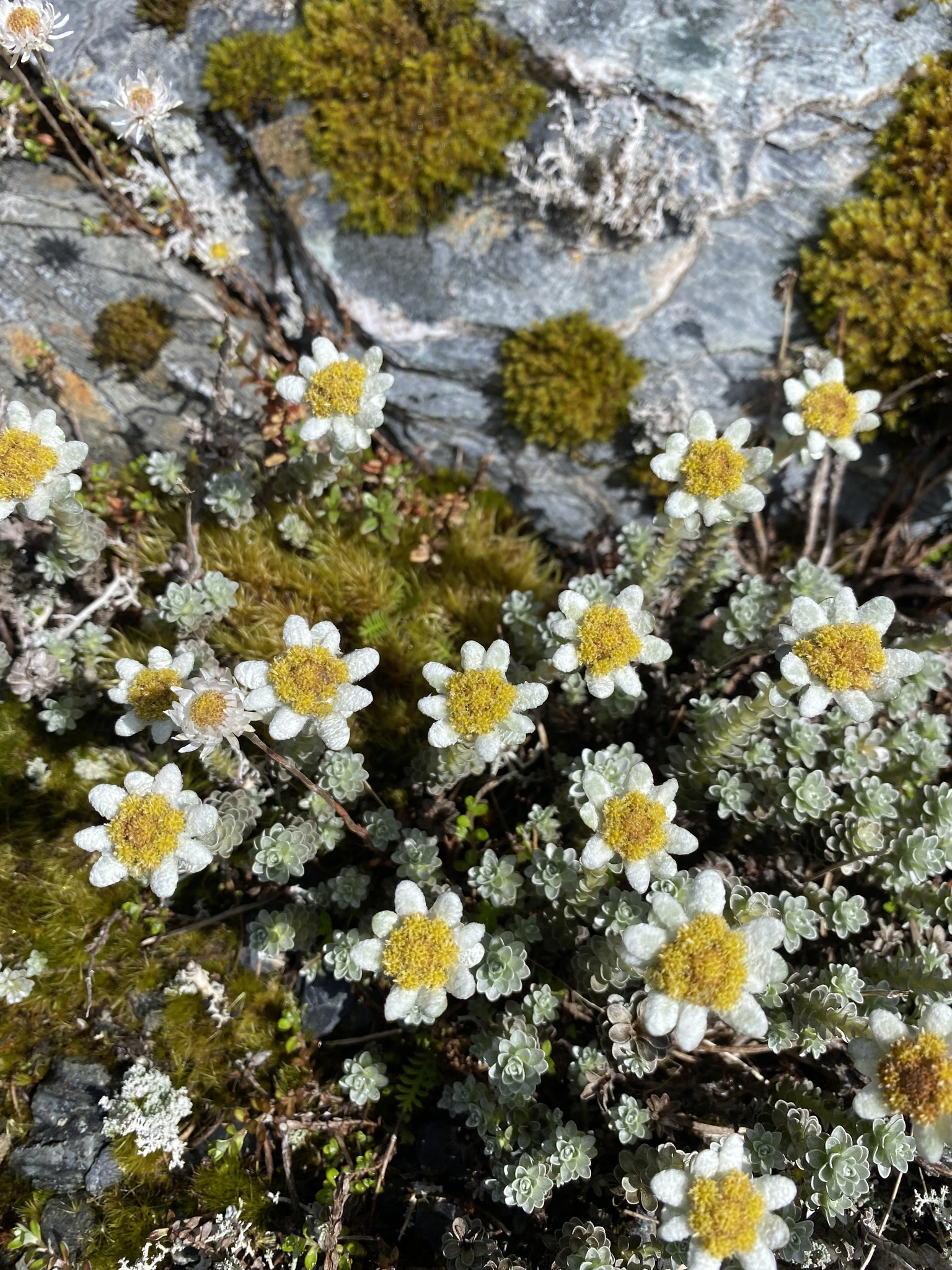

Scientific classification
- Kingdom: Plantae
- Clade: Tracheophytes
- Clade: Angiosperms
- Clade: Eudicots
- Clade: Asterids
- Order: Asterales
- Family: Asteraceae
- Genus: Leucogenes
- Species: L. grandiceps

Binomial name
- Leucogenes grandiceps Beauverd

Synonyms
- Helichrysum sect. Leontopodioides Benth.

= Leucogenes grandiceps =

Species of flowering plant in New Zealand

Leucogenes grandiceps, commonly known as the South Island edelweiss, is a species of plant in the family Asteraceae. It is native to the South and Stewart Islands of New Zealand.

== Description ==
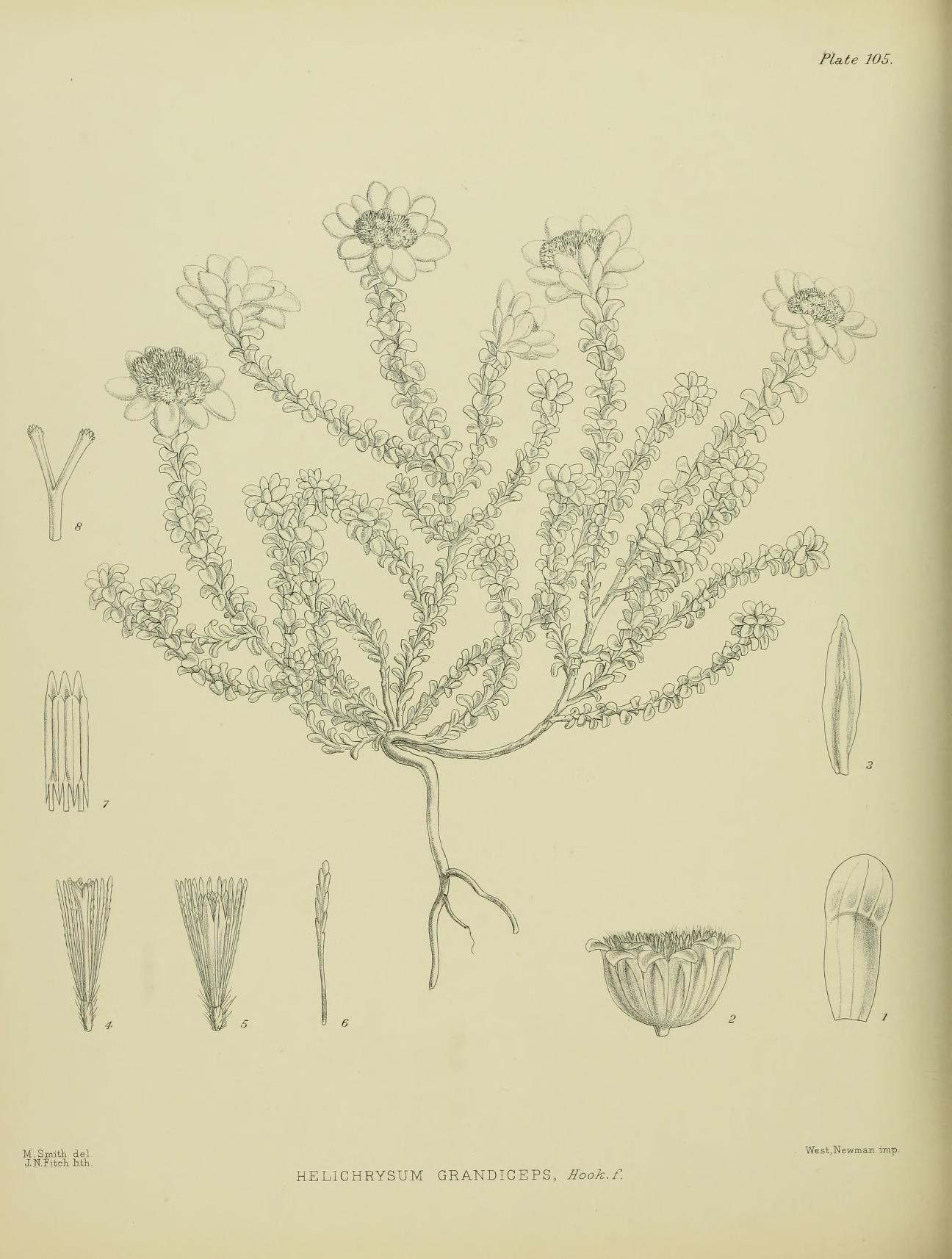
Illustration of Helichrysum grandiceps now known as Leucogenes grandiceps

Leucogenes grandiceps is a perennial herb with leafy stems and white and yellow flowers. It grows up to 0.1 cm tall by 10 cm (3.9 in) wide and has pale green leaves.

== Habitat preferences ==
Leucogenes grandiceps prefers subalpine and alpine regions.

== Life cycle ==
Leucogenes grandiceps flowers between November and March and seed is wind dispersed.

== Predators, parasites and diseases ==
Leucogenes grandiceps serves as a food source for a variety of endemic insect species in its native habitat. One such insect is the Adoxia obscura beetle, which visits the flowers of the plant. Several grasshopper species, including Brachaspis nivalis, Paprides nitidus, Sigaus australis, and Sigaus villosus, are also known to feed on the leaves, flowers, and fruits of Leucogenes grandiceps. Several wasp and bee species, such as Lasioglossum maunga and Leioproctus pekanui, are associated with the plant along with a variety of fly species, including Melangyna novaezelandiae, Melangyna sp., Muscidae sp., Plethochaetigera setiventris, and Veluta albicincta.
