= Scotia Sea Islands tundra =

Tundra ecoregion

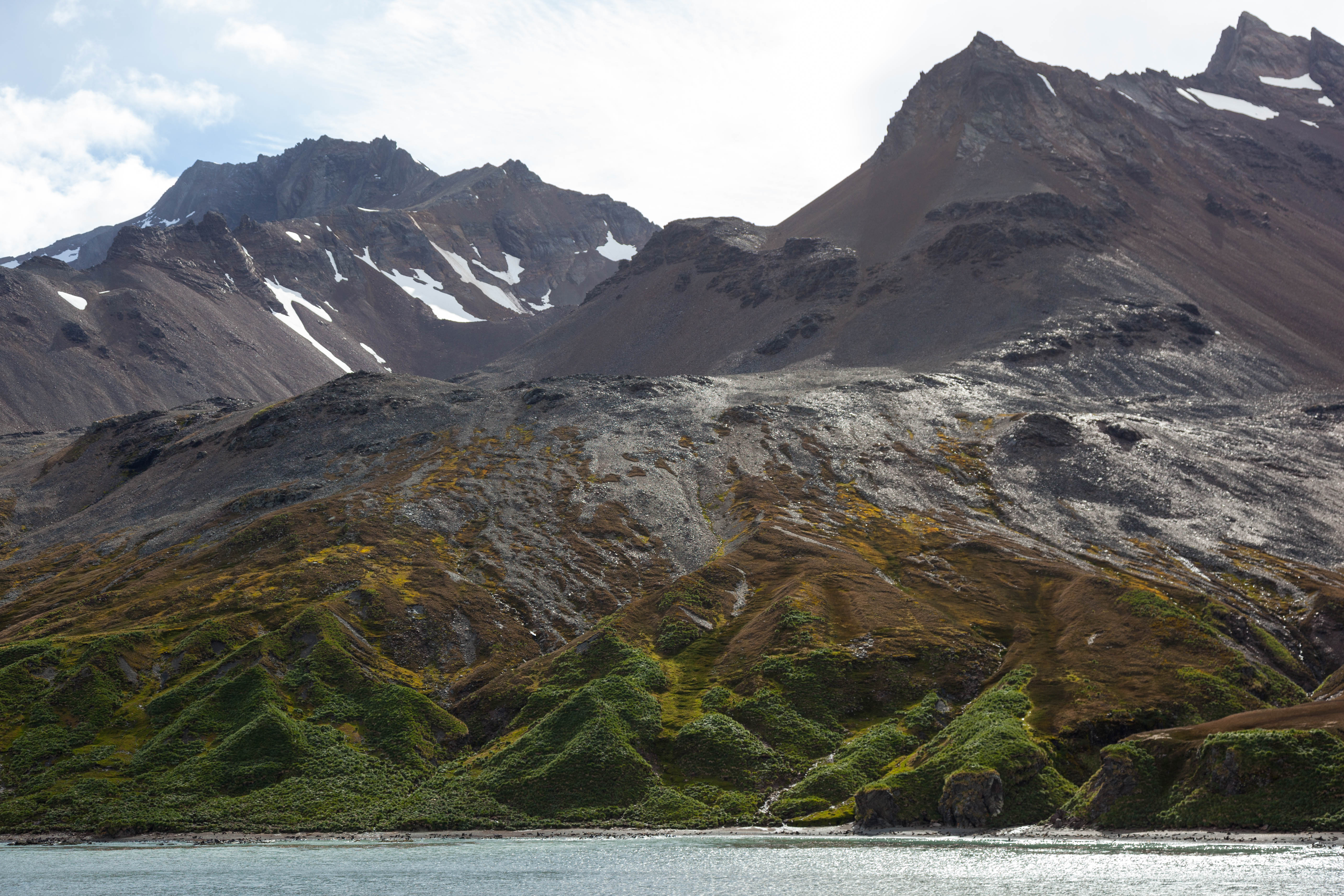
- South Georgia

- Islands of the ecoregion (in red dashed box)

Ecology
- Realm: Antarctic
- Biome: tundra

Geography
- Area: 7,493 km^{2} (2,893 sq mi)
- Countries: Norway; United Kingdom
- Overseas territories: Bouvet Island; British Antarctic Territory, South Georgia and the South Sandwich Islands
- Coordinates: 54.45°S 36.45°W

Conservation
- Conservation status: Relatively stable/intact
- Protected: 0 km² (0%)

The Scotia Sea Islands tundra is a tundra ecoregion (WWF AN1103) which includes several island groups – South Georgia and the South Sandwich Islands, South Shetland Islands, and Bouvet Island – in the Scotia Sea, where the South Atlantic Ocean meets the Southern Ocean. Most of the terrain is covered with snow and permanent ice, with tundra vegetation - moss, lichen, and algae - on the remainder. The islands support important rookeries for seals, seabirds, and penguins. The islands have no permanent human habitation, and the cold, harsh climate and ending of seal hunting and whaling has prevented settlement.

== Location and description ==
The island groups of the ecoregion are southeast of the southern tip of South America.

- South Georgia and the South Sandwich Islands, the largest land masses in the Scotia Sea, South GEorgia is mountainous, rising to 2,934 metres (9,626 ft).
- South Shetland Islands, are 80 to 90% glaciated. They are only 269 metres (0.167 mi) from Graham Land, Antarctica.
- South Orkney Islands, 604 kilometres (375 mi) northeast of the tip of Antarctica.
- Bouvet Island, an uninhabited volcanic island 1,900 kilometres (1,200 mi) east of the South Sandwich Islands.

== Climate ==
The climate of the islands is Tundra climate (Köppen climate classification ET), a cold, harsh climate in which at least one month has an average temperature high enough to melt snow (0 °C (32 °F)), but no month with an average temperature in excess of 10 °C (50 °F). Because the islands are south of the Antarctic Convergence, the climate is more closely associated with Antarctica than South America.

== Flora and fauna ==
South Georgia supports a rich tundra with 50 species of vascular plants. The colder South Orkney and South Shetland islands support only simple mosses, lichens, and algae. The islands have no native land animals, but support a marine fauna that include sea birds and seals.

== See also ==
- Flora of South Georgia
