= Robinsonia boliviana =

Scientific classification
- Domain: Eukaryota
- Kingdom: Animalia
- Phylum: Arthropoda
- Class: Insecta
- Order: Lepidoptera
- Superfamily: Noctuoidea
- Family: Erebidae
- Subfamily: Arctiinae
- Genus: Robinsonia
- Species: R. boliviana

Binomial name
- Robinsonia boliviana Seitz, 1921

Species of moth

Robinsonia boliviana is a moth in the family Erebidae. It was described by Adalbert Seitz in 1921. It is found in French Guiana, Peru and Bolivia.
