= Robinsonia evanida =

Scientific classification
- Kingdom: Animalia
- Phylum: Arthropoda
- Class: Insecta
- Order: Lepidoptera
- Superfamily: Noctuoidea
- Family: Erebidae
- Subfamily: Arctiinae
- Genus: Robinsonia
- Species: R. evanida

Binomial name
- Robinsonia evanida Schaus, 1905

Species of moth

Robinsonia evanida is a moth in the family Erebidae. It was described by William Schaus in 1905. It is found on Cuba.
