= Robinsonia spitzi =

Scientific classification
- Domain: Eukaryota
- Kingdom: Animalia
- Phylum: Arthropoda
- Class: Insecta
- Order: Lepidoptera
- Superfamily: Noctuoidea
- Family: Erebidae
- Subfamily: Arctiinae
- Genus: Robinsonia
- Species: R. spitzi

Binomial name
- Robinsonia spitzi (Rothschild, 1933)

Synonyms
- Prumala spitzi Rothschild, 1933; Robinsonia variegata Reich, 1938

Species of moth

Robinsonia spitzi is a moth in the family Erebidae. It was described by Walter Rothschild in 1933. It is found in Brazil.
