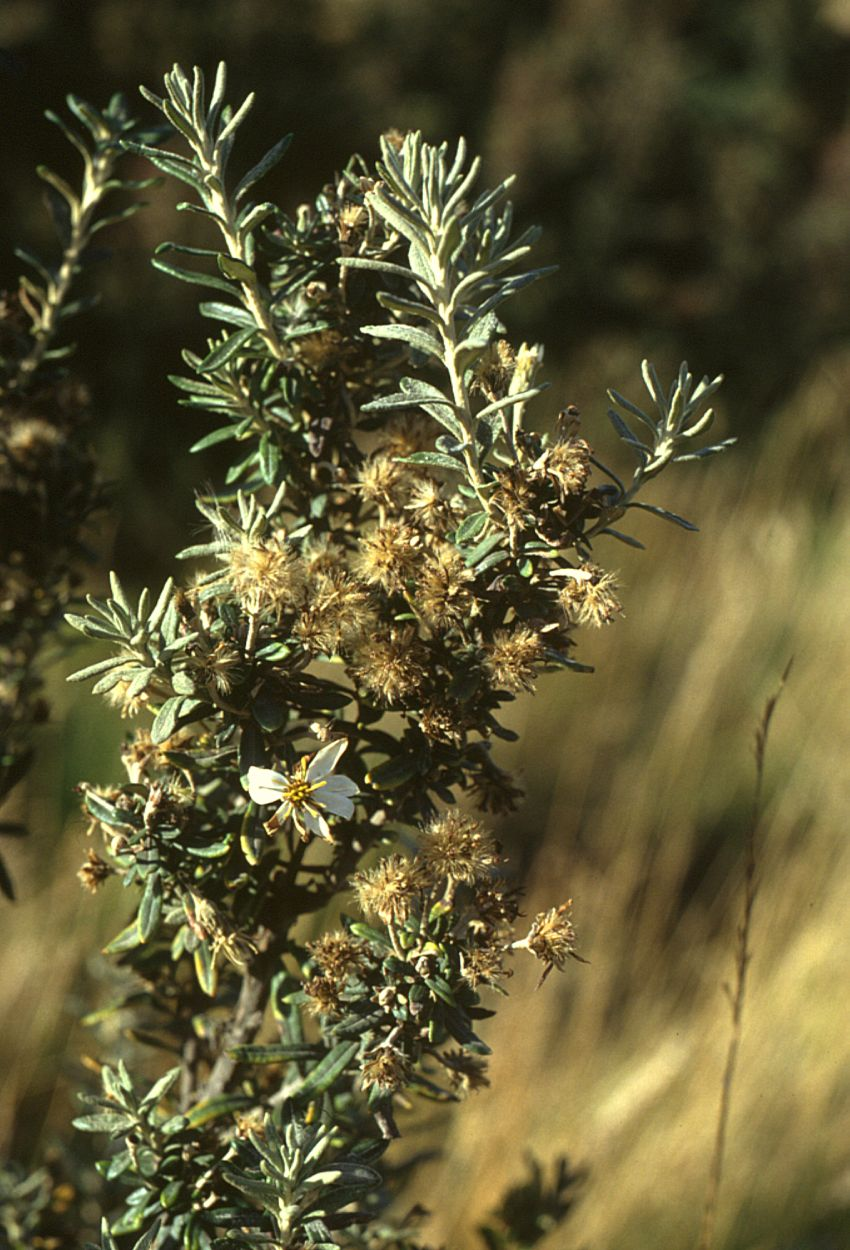

Scientific classification
- Kingdom: Plantae
- Clade: Tracheophytes
- Clade: Angiosperms
- Clade: Eudicots
- Clade: Asterids
- Order: Asterales
- Family: Asteraceae
- Genus: Chiliotrichum
- Species: C. diffusum

Binomial name
- Chiliotrichum diffusum (G.Forst.) Kuntze

Synonyms
- Chiliotrichum amelloides

= Chiliotrichum diffusum =

Species of flowering plant

Chiliotrichum diffusum is a species of small shrub, a flowering plant in the family Asteraceae, commonly known as fachine, fascine or mata verde in Spanish. It is native to the southern tip of South America and the Falkland Islands.

== Description ==
Chiliotrichum diffusum is a small, much-branched shrub growing to a height of about 1.5 m (5 ft). It resembles a rosemary bush with aromatic greyish-green foliage. The leaves are elliptical or lanceolate, dark green above and hairy beneath. The white, daisy-like flowers are about 2.5 cm (1 in) in diameter.

== Distribution and habitat ==
Its range extends from Valdivia to the Magallanes Province in Chile and it is found in the southern part of Argentina, from sea level to about 400 m (1,312 ft).

In the Falklands Islands, at one time it was common but since the arrival of livestock on the islands, it now mainly occurs in valley bottoms, ravines and other inaccessible places. In southern Chile and Argentina it is the dominant plant on the fringes of the Nothofagus forest.

== Ecology ==
Chiliotrichum diffusum is native to steppe grassland in Chile, Argentina and the Falkland Islands, where it is one of the dominant shrubby plants in a community that includes Trevoa, Schinus polygama, Paleaepappus patagonicus, Berberis microphylla, various grasses and sedges.
