= Robinsonia valerana =

Scientific classification
- Domain: Eukaryota
- Kingdom: Animalia
- Phylum: Arthropoda
- Class: Insecta
- Order: Lepidoptera
- Superfamily: Noctuoidea
- Family: Erebidae
- Subfamily: Arctiinae
- Genus: Robinsonia
- Species: R. valerana

Binomial name
- Robinsonia valerana Schaus, 1933

Species of moth

Robinsonia valerana is a moth in the family Erebidae. It was described by William Schaus in 1933. It is found in Venezuela.
