= Robinsonia longimacula =

Scientific classification
- Domain: Eukaryota
- Kingdom: Animalia
- Phylum: Arthropoda
- Class: Insecta
- Order: Lepidoptera
- Superfamily: Noctuoidea
- Family: Erebidae
- Subfamily: Arctiinae
- Genus: Robinsonia
- Species: R. longimacula

Binomial name
- Robinsonia longimacula Schaus, 1915

Synonyms
- Robinsonia intermedia Reich, 1938

Species of moth

Robinsonia longimacula is a moth in the family Erebidae. It was described by William Schaus in 1915. It is found in Brazil.
