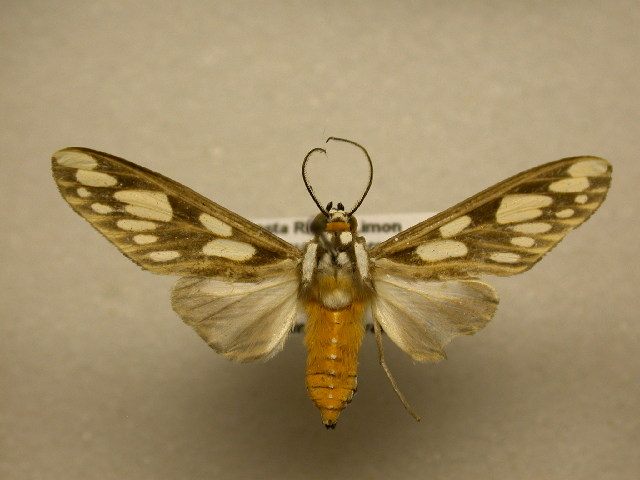

Scientific classification
- Domain: Eukaryota
- Kingdom: Animalia
- Phylum: Arthropoda
- Class: Insecta
- Order: Lepidoptera
- Superfamily: Noctuoidea
- Family: Erebidae
- Subfamily: Arctiinae
- Genus: Robinsonia
- Species: R. bartolana

Binomial name
- Robinsonia bartolana Laguerre & Espinoza, 2006

= Robinsonia bartolana =

Species of moth

Robinsonia bartolana is a moth in the family Erebidae. It was described by Michel Laguerre and Bernardo A. Espinoza in 2006. It is found in Nicaragua. and Costa Rica.
