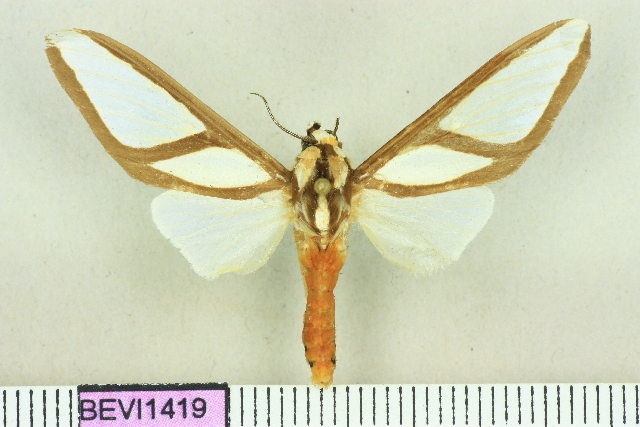

Scientific classification
- Domain: Eukaryota
- Kingdom: Animalia
- Phylum: Arthropoda
- Class: Insecta
- Order: Lepidoptera
- Superfamily: Noctuoidea
- Family: Erebidae
- Subfamily: Arctiinae
- Genus: Robinsonia
- Species: R. dewitzi

Binomial name
- Robinsonia dewitzi Gundlach, 1881

Synonyms
- Robinsonia grotei Schaus, 1895

= Robinsonia dewitzi =

Species of moth

Robinsonia dewitzi is a moth in the family Erebidae first described by Juan Gundlach in 1881. It is found in Mexico, Costa Rica, Guatemala, Trinidad, Cuba, the Dominican Republic, the Guyanas, Brazil, Venezuela, Paraguay, Peru and Ecuador.
