= Robinsonia irregularis =

Scientific classification
- Domain: Eukaryota
- Kingdom: Animalia
- Phylum: Arthropoda
- Class: Insecta
- Order: Lepidoptera
- Superfamily: Noctuoidea
- Family: Erebidae
- Subfamily: Arctiinae
- Genus: Robinsonia
- Species: R. irregularis

Binomial name
- Robinsonia irregularis Rothschild, 1917

Species of moth

Robinsonia irregularis is a moth in the family Erebidae. It was described by Rothschild in 1917. It is found in Brazil (Mato Grosso).
