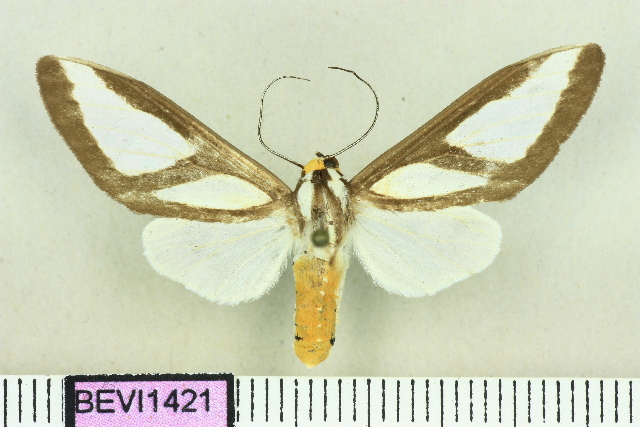

Scientific classification
- Domain: Eukaryota
- Kingdom: Animalia
- Phylum: Arthropoda
- Class: Insecta
- Order: Lepidoptera
- Superfamily: Noctuoidea
- Family: Erebidae
- Subfamily: Arctiinae
- Genus: Robinsonia
- Species: R. klagesi

Binomial name
- Robinsonia klagesi Rothschild, 1910

= Robinsonia klagesi =

Species of moth

Robinsonia klagesi is a moth in the family Erebidae. It was described by Walter Rothschild in 1910. It is found in French Guiana, Venezuela and Bolivia.
