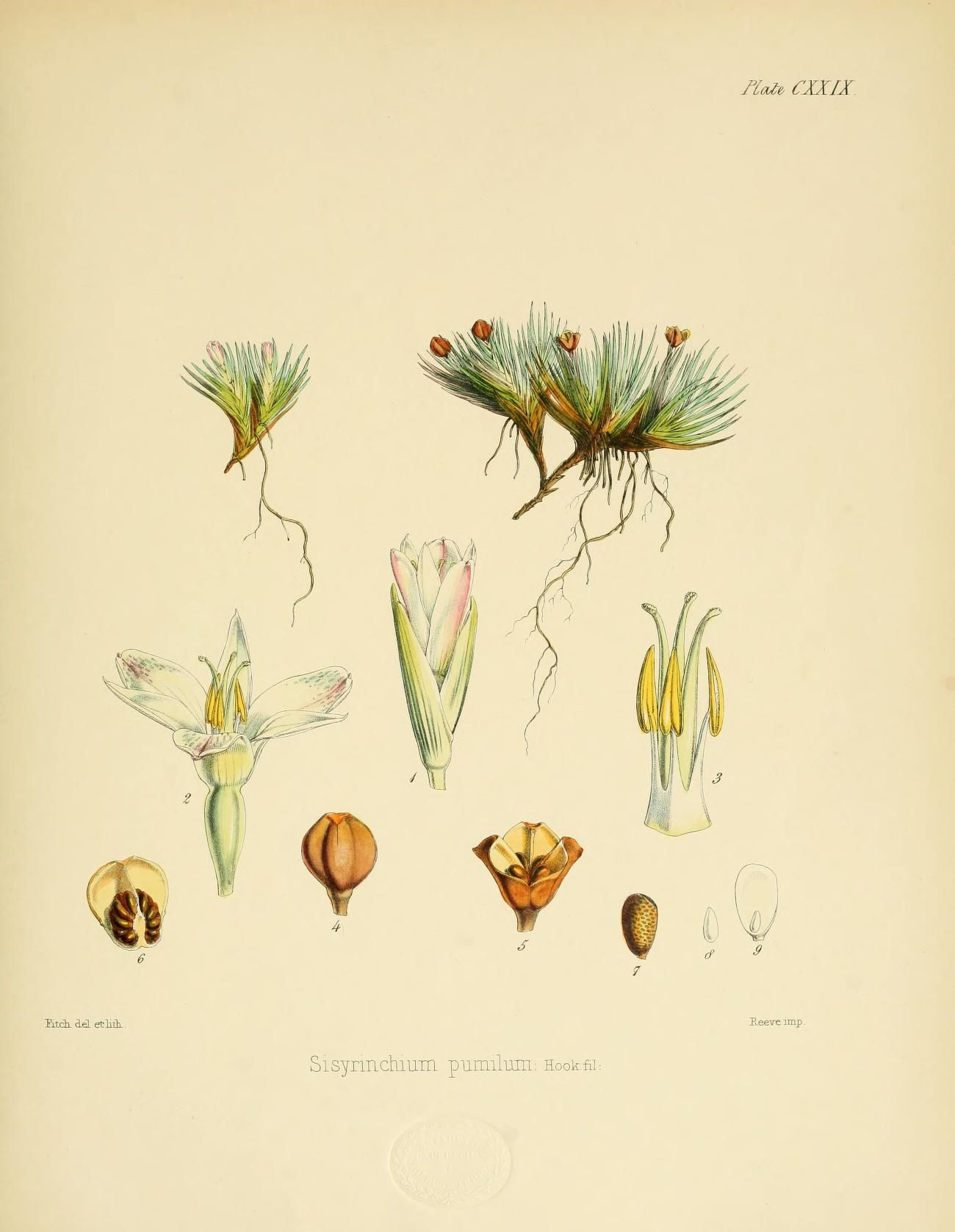

Scientific classification
- Kingdom: Plantae
- Clade: Tracheophytes
- Clade: Angiosperms
- Clade: Monocots
- Order: Asparagales
- Family: Iridaceae
- Subfamily: Iridoideae
- Tribe: Sisyrinchieae
- Genus: Tapeinia; Comm. ex Juss.
- Species: T. pumila

Binomial name
- Tapeinia pumila (G.Forst.) Baill.

Synonyms
- List: Ixia pumila G.Forst.; Sisyrinchium pumilum (G.Forst.) Hook.f.; Witsenia pumila (G.Forst.) Vahl; Galaxia magellanica (Lam.) Steud.; Ixia magellanica Lam.; Moraea magellanica (Lam.) Willd.; Tapeinia magellanica (Lam.) J.F.Gmel.; Witsenia magellanica (Lam.) Pers.

= Tapeinia =

Genus of flowering plants

Tapeinia is a monotypic genus of flowering plants in the family Iridaceae. The genus name is derived from the Greek word tapeinos, meaning "low". The single species, Tapeinia pumila, is native to Southern Chile (from Araucanía to Magallanes regions) and Argentina.
