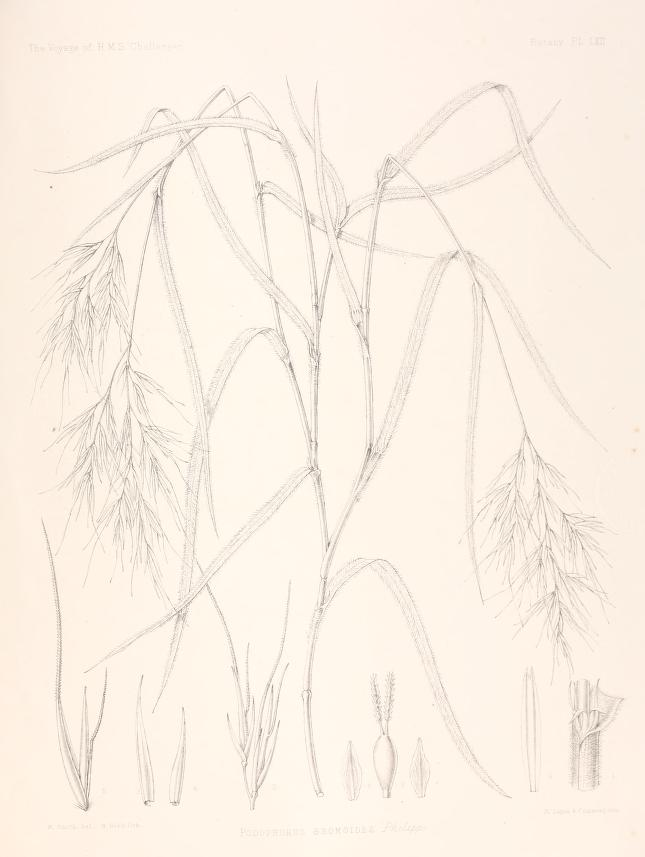

Scientific classification
- Kingdom: Plantae
- Clade: Tracheophytes
- Clade: Angiosperms
- Clade: Monocots
- Clade: Commelinids
- Order: Poales
- Family: Poaceae
- Subfamily: Pooideae
- Supertribe: Poodae
- Tribe: Poeae
- Subtribe: Loliinae
- Genus: Festuca
- Species: F. masatierrae

Binomial name
- Festuca masatierrae Röser & Tkach

Synonyms
- Podophorus bromoides Phil.

= Festuca masatierrae =

Extinct genus of grasses

Festuca masatierrae is an extinct species of plant in the grass family. It was endemic to Robinson Crusoe Island (formerly known as Más a Tierra) in the Juan Fernández Islands, located in the South Pacific Ocean and part of the Republic of Chile. The plant was last collected in the wild in the mid-19th century and is now considered extinct.

The plant was first described in 1856 as Podophorus bromoides, and placed in the monotypic genus Podophorus. A genetic analysis of the type material found it to be most closely related to Megalachne, also endemic to the Juan Fernández archipelago. This clade was in turn found to be nested within a paraphyletic Festuca, most closely related to F. pampeana of South America. In 2020 it was placed in the genus Festuca as F. masatierrae.
