= Melosperma =

Scientific classification
- Kingdom: Plantae
- Clade: Tracheophytes
- Clade: Angiosperms
- Clade: Eudicots
- Clade: Asterids
- Order: Lamiales
- Family: Plantaginaceae
- Genus: Melosperma; Benth. (1846)
- Species: M. andicola

Binomial name
- Melosperma andicola Benth. (1846)

Varieties
- Melosperma andicola var. andicola; Melosperma andicola var. angustifolia (Phil.) Rossow

Genus of plants

Melosperma andicola is a species of flowering plant belonging to the family Plantaginaceae. It is the sole species in genus Melosperma.

It is a subshrub native to southern South America, ranging along the Andes of western Argentina and central Chile.

Two varieties are accepted.

- Melosperma andicola var. andicola (synonyms Herpestis andicola Gillies ex Benth. and Melosperma glabra Phil.) – western Argentina and central Chile
- Melosperma andicola var. angustifolia (Phil.) Rossow (synonym Melosperma angustifolia Phil.) – western Argentina and central Chile
