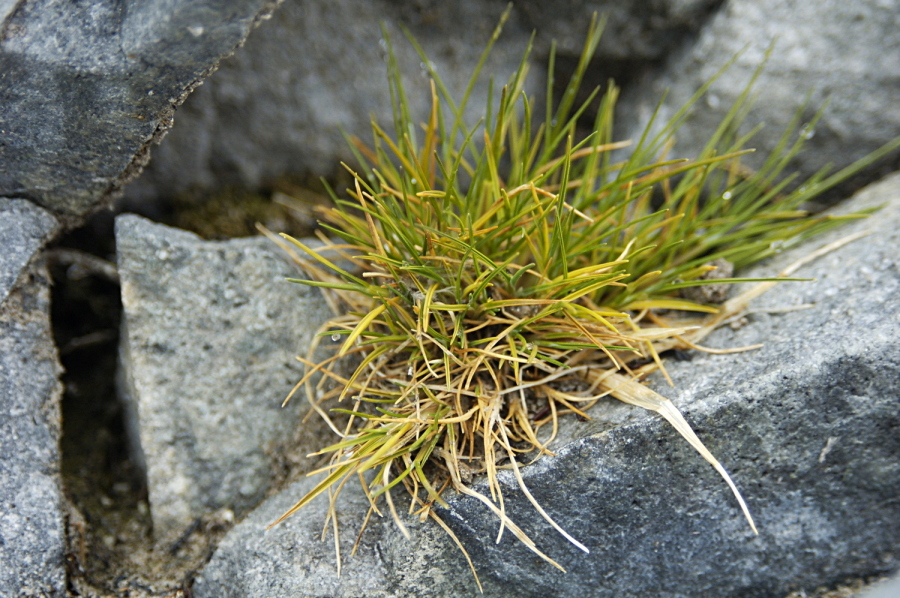

Scientific classification
- Kingdom: Plantae
- Clade: Tracheophytes
- Clade: Angiosperms
- Clade: Monocots
- Clade: Commelinids
- Order: Poales
- Family: Poaceae
- Subfamily: Pooideae
- Genus: Deschampsia
- Species: D. antarctica

Binomial name
- Deschampsia antarctica É.Desv.

Synonyms
- Airidium elegantulum Steud.; Deschampsia elegantula (Steud.) Parodi; Deschampsia henrardii Kloos

= Deschampsia antarctica =

Species of plant

Deschampsia antarctica, the Antarctic hair grass, is one of two vascular flowering plants native to Antarctica, the other being Colobanthus quitensis (Antarctic pearlwort).

It is usually less than a half a foot in diameter.

== Habitat and ecology ==
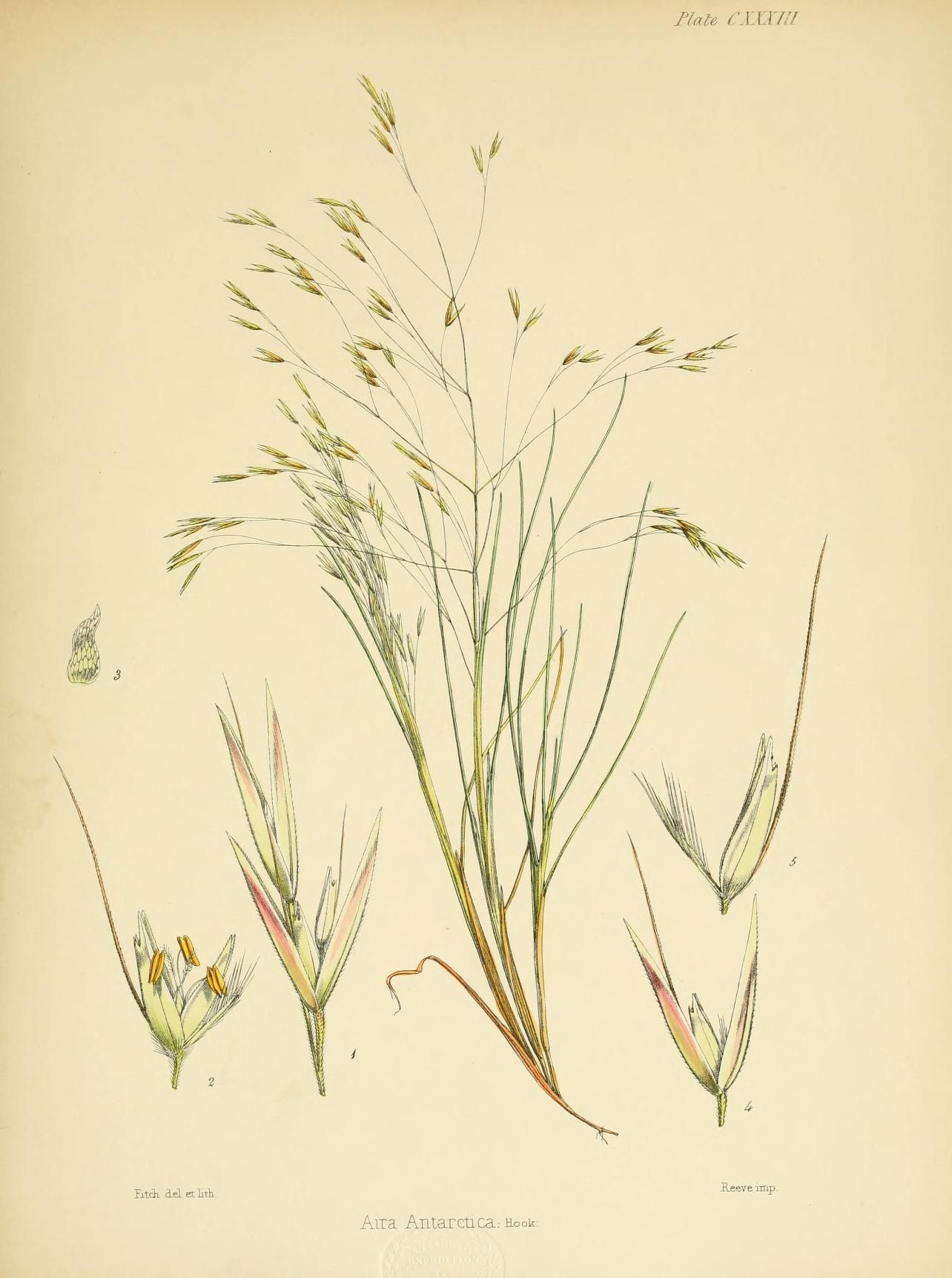
An early illustration of the species under its previous name Aira antarctica

In Antarctica, the plant can be found forming low clumps in wet, protected habitats.

Deschampsia antarctica mainly occurs on the South Orkney Islands, the South Shetland Islands, and along the western Antarctic Peninsula. Deschampsia antartica distribution largely depends on the area's nutrient supply of the soil and its water distribution. Deschampsia antarctica has been recorded by the Guinness Book of World Records as the southernmost flowering plant. In 1981, a specimen was found on the Antarctic Peninsula's Refuge Islands at a latitude of 68°21′S.

=== Climate change ===
Since 2009, both D. antarctica and C. quitensis have been spreading rapidly, which studies suggest has been the result of rising air temperatures and a reduction in the number of fur seals.

=== Reproduction ===
The plant is capable of reproducing sexually through self-pollination or outcrossing, and asexually through vegetative spread. Pollination with other plants usually occurs via the wind. Self-pollination usually occurs through cleistogamy, a type of self-pollination that occurs within non-opening flowers. Fragments are also distributed by seabirds, particularly skua and gulls, which introduce the grass to new areas.

== See also ==
- Antarctic flora
