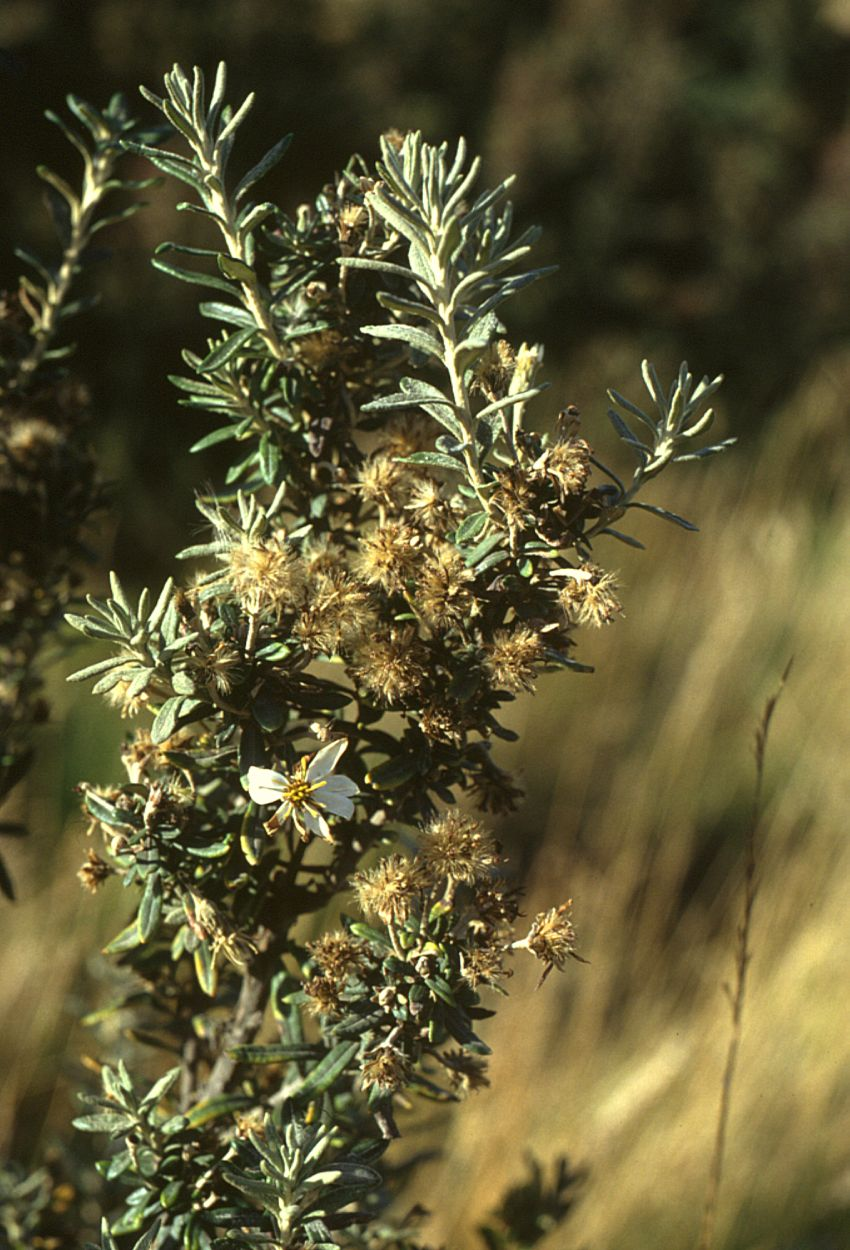
- Chiliotrichum diffusum

Scientific classification
- Kingdom: Plantae
- Clade: Tracheophytes
- Clade: Angiosperms
- Clade: Eudicots
- Clade: Asterids
- Order: Asterales
- Family: Asteraceae
- Subfamily: Asteroideae
- Tribe: Astereae
- Subtribe: Chiliotrichinae
- Genus: Chiliotrichum; Cass.

= Chiliotrichum =

Genus of flowering plants

Chiliotrichum is a genus of flowering plants in the family Asteraceae.

Species

- Chiliotrichum angustifolium Phil. - Chile
- Chiliotrichum diffusum (G.Forst.) Kuntze - Chile, Argentina, Falkland Islands (Islas Malvinas)
- Chiliotrichum rosmarinifolium Less. - Chile, Argentina
- Chiliotrichum tenue Phil. - Chile
