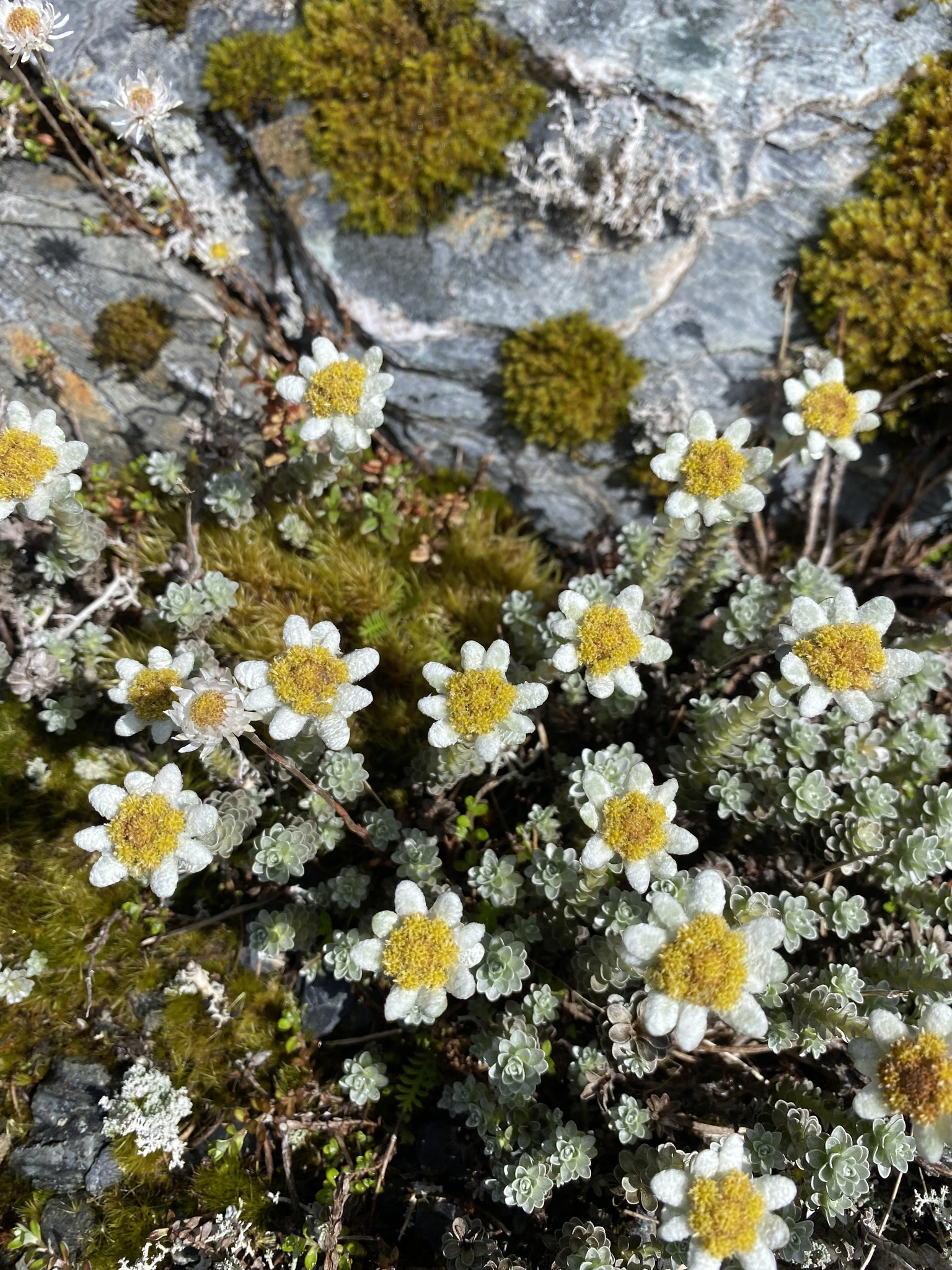
- Leucogenes grandiceps

Scientific classification
- Kingdom: Plantae
- Clade: Embryophytes
- Clade: Tracheophytes
- Clade: Angiosperms
- Clade: Eudicots
- Clade: Asterids
- Order: Asterales
- Family: Asteraceae
- Subfamily: Asteroideae
- Tribe: Gnaphalieae
- Genus: Leucogenes; Beauverd

Synonyms
- Helichrysum sect. Leontopodioides Benth.

= Leucogenes =

Genus of flowering plants

Leucogenes is a genus of plants in the family Asteraceae, native to New Zealand.

== Species ==
Sources:

- Leucogenes grandiceps (Hook.f.) Beauverd - New Zealand
- Leucogenes leontopodium (Hook.f.) Beauverd - New Zealand
- Leucogenes neglecta Molloy - New Zealand
- Leucogenes tarahaoa Molloy - New Zealand
