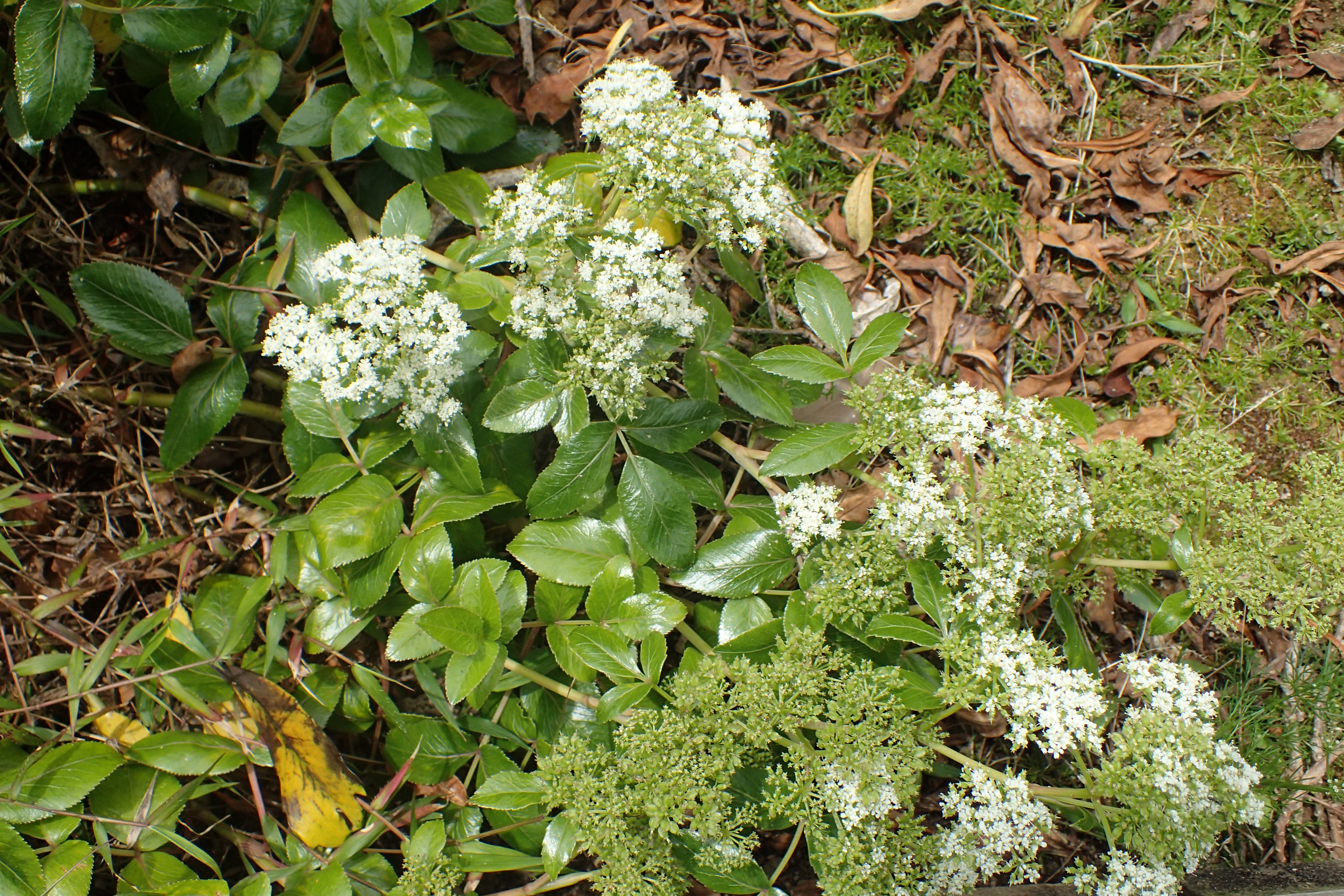
- Scandia rosifolia

Scientific classification
- Kingdom: Plantae
- Clade: Tracheophytes
- Clade: Angiosperms
- Clade: Eudicots
- Clade: Asterids
- Order: Apiales
- Family: Apiaceae
- Subfamily: Apioideae
- Tribe: Aciphylleae
- Genus: Scandia; J.W.Dawson

= Scandia (plant) =

Genus of flowering plant

Scandia is a genus of flowering plants belonging to the family Apiaceae. It is also in tribe Aciphylleae, with plants, Gingidia Dawson and Lignocarpa Dawson, with all three genera being native to New Zealand. They are scrambling shrubs with white flowers.

== Description ==
Scandia is a perennial subshrubs or liana (a woody climbing plant). It is Glabrous (lacking surface ornamentation such as hairs, scales or bristles; smooth). They form woody stems, especially in the older parts of the plant. The vegetative stems have elongated internodes which are decumbent (having branches growing horizontally along the ground but which are turned up at the ends) or it can grow through nearby shrubs. Scandia geniculata has weaker stems than Scandia rosifolia and may climb up to 2 m (6 ft 7 in) or more through other closeby vegetation. It has cauline (borne on an aerial stem) leaves, which are simple or once pinnately compound and they are subfleshy or subcoriaceous (slightly leathery). The leaflets are ovate to obovate (in shape) and serrate (toothed with asymmetrical teeth) or crenate (blunt or rounded teeth) on the edges. The stomata (pores in the leaf) are restricted to the under surface of the leaf. It has a sheath open at the top and produced into a pair of membranous lobes. The petioles (leaf stallks) have broad adaxial grooves. It is gynodioecious (in which female and hermaphroditic plants coexist within a population). The flowers are terminal (at the ends of stems), it has simple bracts, which are narrow-linear in shape and folicaeous (resembling a leaf or leaves). It bears large quantities of white flower heads that have a great resemblance to that of 'Queen Anne’s Lace' (or Ammi majus). The sepals are smaller than petals, and the petals of female flowers are smaller than those of the male and hermaphrodite plants. The female flowers have conspicuous petals and rudimentary staminodes (a sterile stamen). It has slender styles, and conical shaped stylopodium (elongate stigma that resembles a style; or a false style). After flowering, it produces a seed capsule/ fruit, which is ovate-elliptsoid in shape and slightly compressed dorsally or subterete (not precisely cylindrical). The mericarps (one segment of a fruit) has five acute ribs. The dorsal and lateral ribs are acute or narrowly winged and the marginal ribs are broadly winged. The carpophore (an elongation of the base of the gynoecium which looks distinct) is bifid (forked) almost to the base. The vittae (an oil tube) is large and has a resin canal (vallecular), commissural (has 2 faces). It has a rib oil ducts in each rib. The seeds are trasversely subterete to slightly compressed dorsally (in shape). They are sulcate under the vittae, with the face convex.

=== Biochemistry ===
It is diploid, containing two copies of each chromosome and has the somatic number of 2n=22.

== Habitat ==
It is native to New Zealand. Both species are found in coastal or low-altitude inland habitats, Scandia rosaefolia is found in northern and central parts of the North Island and Scandia geniculata is found in the southern part of the North Island and in the east of the South Island.

== Taxonomy ==
It contains two species that were formerly placed in the genus Angelica (also within the same Apiaceae family). Scandia rosifolia was designated as Angelica rosaefolia. It was also originally classified by W.J. Hooker as Anisotome rosaefolia.

It was first described and published in New Zealand J. Bot. Vol.5 on page 407 in 1967. The genus name of Scandia is derived from the Latin, scandere, which means 'to climb'.

The genus is recognized by the United States Department of Agriculture and the Agricultural Research Service, but they do not list any known species.

== Known species ==
There are 2 accepted species;

- Scandia geniculata (G.Forst.) J.W.Dawson
- Scandia rosifolia (Hook.) J.W.Dawson

Scandia geniculata is commonly known as 'New Zealand Aniseed'. The Latin specific epithet of 'geniculata' is derived from the Latin word for 'jointed', no doubt referring to the manner by which its climbing stems are arranged.

== Uses ==
Both species of Scandia have been used by the Dutch garden designer and author, Piet Oudolf.

== Other sources ==
- Lawrence James Metcalf, The Cultivation of New Zealand Plants, Godwit Press, 1993
- Lucy B. Moore, The Oxford Book of New Zealand Plants, Oxford University Press, 1978
