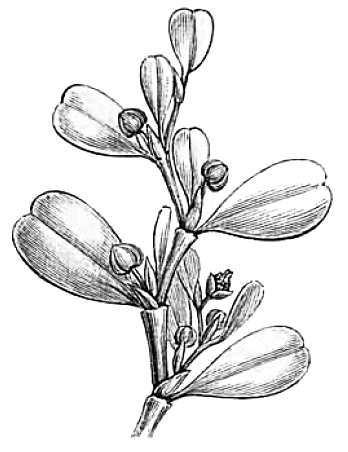

Scientific classification
- Kingdom: Plantae
- Clade: Tracheophytes
- Clade: Angiosperms
- Clade: Magnoliids
- Order: Piperales
- Family: Aristolochiaceae
- Genus: Lactoris; Phil.
- Species: L. fernandeziana

Binomial name
- Lactoris fernandeziana Phil.

= Lactoris =

Genus of shrubs

Lactoris fernandeziana is a flowering shrub endemic to the cloud forest of Masatierra – Robinson Crusoe Island, of the Juan Fernández Islands archipelago of Chile. It is the only extant species in the genus Lactoris.

== Taxonomy ==
The species is now included in Aristolochiaceae following APG IV (2016).

Morphological data are not clear concerning the classification of Lactoris, but molecular data place it in the Aristolochiaceae.

In the fossil record, pollen has been found which seems to be related to the living Lactoris species.

== Habitat and conservation ==
Lactoris fernandeziana seems to be wind-pollinated. The wild population of about 1000 plants has low genetic diversity, and grows on foggy and rainy slopes, usually as an understory plant but sometimes in full sun.

Cultivation of seedlings has generally been unsuccessful, although cuttings have worked better and better knowledge of preferred growing conditions may make cultivation easier.

== See also ==
- Fernandezian region

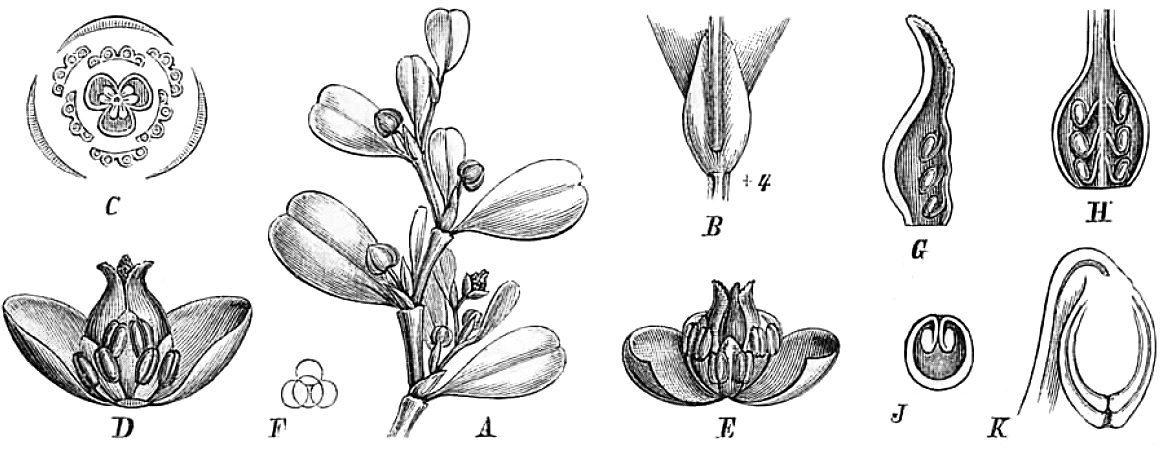
Lactoris fernandeziana — 1888 botanical illustration.
