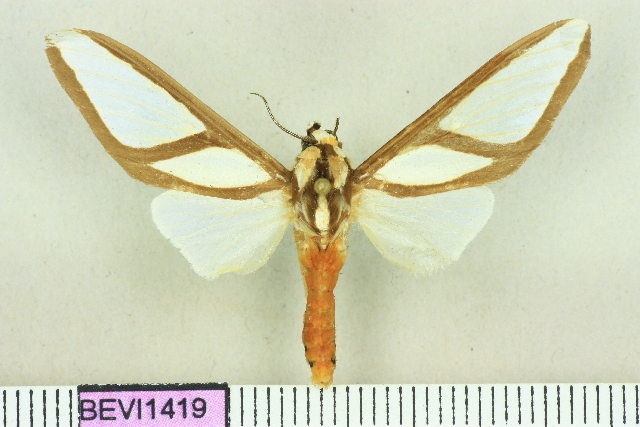
- Robinsonia dewitzi

Scientific classification
- Domain: Eukaryota
- Kingdom: Animalia
- Phylum: Arthropoda
- Class: Insecta
- Order: Lepidoptera
- Superfamily: Noctuoidea
- Family: Erebidae
- Subfamily: Arctiinae
- Subtribe: Phaegopterina
- Genus: Robinsonia; Grote, [1866]

= Robinsonia (moth) =

Genus of moths

Robinsonia is a genus of moths in the family Erebidae. The genus was erected by Augustus Radcliffe Grote in 1866.

== Species ==
- Robinsonia banghaasi Rothschild, 1911
- Robinsonia bartolana Laguerre & Espinoza, 2006
- Robinsonia boliviana Seitz, 1921
- Robinsonia cajali (Hoffmann, 1934)
- Robinsonia catasticta Hampson, 1916
- Robinsonia deiopea H. Druce, 1895
- Robinsonia dewitzi Gundlach, 1881
- Robinsonia evanida Schaus, 1905
- Robinsonia exprata (Dognin, 1921)
- Robinsonia flavicorpus Dognin, 1910
- Robinsonia flavomarginata H. Druce, 1899
- Robinsonia fogra Schaus, 1895
- Robinsonia formula Grote, [1866]
- Robinsonia irregularis Rothschild, 1917
- Robinsonia klagesi Rothschild, 1910
- Robinsonia lefaivrei Schaus, 1895
- Robinsonia longimacula Schaus, 1915
- Robinsonia marginata Rothschild, 1909
- Robinsonia mera (Schaus, 1910)
- Robinsonia milesi Rothschild, 1922
- Robinsonia morula H. Druce, 1906
- Robinsonia mossi (Rothschild, 1922)
- Robinsonia multimaculata Rothschild, 1909
- Robinsonia polyplagia Schaus, 1901
- Robinsonia praphoea Dognin, 1906
- Robinsonia punctata Rothschild, 1909
- Robinsonia rockstonia Schaus, 1905
- Robinsonia sabata H. Druce, 1895
- Robinsonia sanea H. Druce, 1895
- Robinsonia similis Rothschild, 1909
- Robinsonia spitzi (Rothschild, 1933)
- Robinsonia suffusa Rothschild, 1909
- Robinsonia valerana Schaus, 1933
- Robinsonia willingi Travassos, 1964
