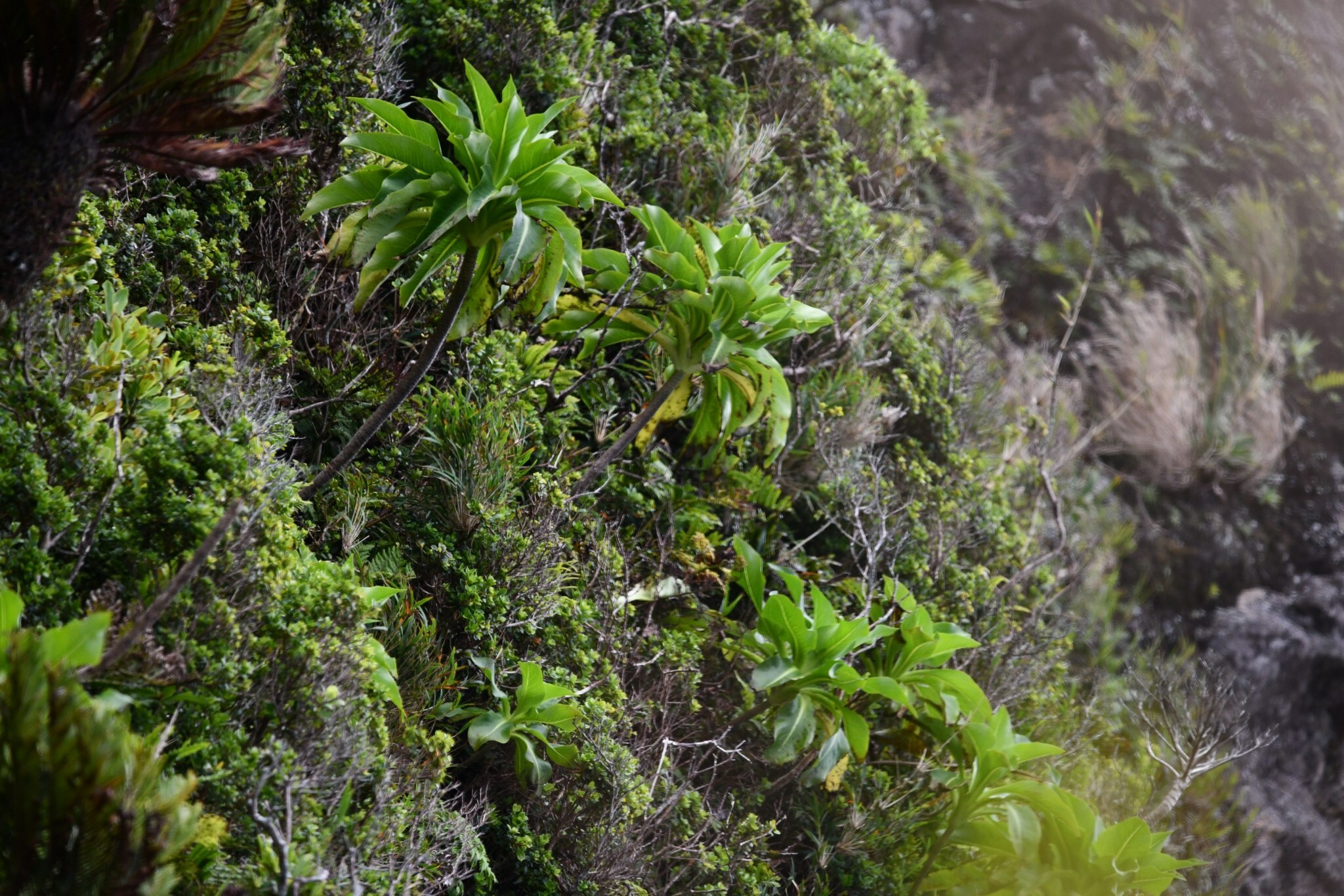
- Centaurodendron dracaenoides

Scientific classification
- Kingdom: Plantae
- Clade: Embryophytes
- Clade: Tracheophytes
- Clade: Spermatophytes
- Clade: Angiosperms
- Clade: Eudicots
- Clade: Asterids
- Order: Asterales
- Family: Asteraceae
- Subfamily: Carduoideae
- Tribe: Cardueae
- Subtribe: Centaureinae
- Genus: Centaurodendron; Johow

Species
- 3; see text

= Centaurodendron =

Genus of flowering plants

Centaurodendron is a genus of flowering plants in the tribe Cardueae within the family Asteraceae. The entire genus is endemic to the Juan Fernández Islands in the southern Pacific Ocean, part of the Republic of Chile.

== Species ==
Three species are accepted.

- Centaurodendron dracaenoides Johow - Robinson Crusoe Island
- Centaurodendron palmiforme Skottsb. - Robinson Crusoe Island
- Centaurodendron schilleri Penneck., N.Garcia & Susanna – Alejandro Selkirk Island
