= Philippiella patagonica =

Scientific classification
- Kingdom: Plantae
- Clade: Tracheophytes
- Clade: Angiosperms
- Clade: Eudicots
- Order: Caryophyllales
- Family: Caryophyllaceae
- Genus: Philippiella; Speg. (1897)
- Species: P. patagonica

Binomial name
- Philippiella patagonica Speg. (1897)

Species of flowering plant

Philippiella patagonica is a species of flowering plant belonging to the family Caryophyllaceae. It is the sole species in genus Philippiella.

== Description ==
It is a sub-shrub, or small shrub. It is cushion forming, and dioecious (having male and female reproductive structures which develop only on different plants).

It has dense, imbricate (tiled) and slightly fleshy leaves. Which are arranged in opposite pairs, linear to obovate in shape, rigid and about 1.5 mm long. It blooms in spring, with solitary, terminal (at the ends of branches) flowers. They are perigynous (borne around the ovary) and subsessile (not completely sessile, a plant stalk). They are about 1–2 cm (0.4–0.8 in) wide and greenish yellow in colour. They have 4 sepals, which are carnose (fleshy), with ciliate (having small hairs) margins. They also have 4 petals, which are filiform (thread-like in shape), and it has 4 stamens which are episepalous (attached to the sepals). The anthers are monothecous (having a sole compartment or cell) and the ovary is 1 celled (uniovulate). The style has 2 clefts, The fruit (or seed capsule) dehiscing irregularly at base. Inside the seeds are ellipsoid and compressed.

== Taxonomy ==
The genus name of Philippiella is in honour of Rodolfo Amando Philippi (1808–1904), a German–Chilean paleontologist and zoologist. The Latin specific epithet of patagonica refers to coming from Patagonia region. Both the genus and the species were first described and published in Revista Fac. Agron. Univ. Nac. La Plata vol.3 on page 566 in 1897.

The species is recognised by the Royal Horticultural Society (RHS), it is also recognised by United States Department of Agriculture and the Agricultural Research Service, but they do not list any known species.

== Distribution and habitat ==
It is native to southern Argentina and Chile.

It grows on cold steppes, at elevations of 0–500 metres (0–1,640 ft) above sea level.

== Cultivation ==
It can be grown in a sunny, open site in poor, sandy soil or within an alpine house. New plants can be grown from seed in spring, in trays or pots with a thin layer of compost over the seed. Germination will take 1-3 months. Also propagation by cuttings in late summer, also works.
