= Megalachne =

Scientific classification
- Kingdom: Plantae
- Clade: Tracheophytes
- Clade: Angiosperms
- Clade: Monocots
- Clade: Commelinids
- Order: Poales
- Family: Poaceae
- Subfamily: Pooideae
- Supertribe: Poodae
- Tribe: Poeae
- Subtribe: Loliinae
- Genus: Megalachne; Steud.
- Species: M. berteroniana

Binomial name
- Megalachne berteroniana Steud.

Synonyms
- Pantathera Phil.; Bromus fernandezianus (Phil.) Skottsb.; Bromus megalachne Pilg.; Pantathera avenacea Hemsl.; Pantathera fernandeziana Phil.

Genus of grasses

Megalachne is a genus of Chilean plants in the grass family, found only on the Juan Fernández Islands in the Pacific Ocean, part of the Republic of Chile. It contains a single species, Megalachne berteroniana.

A genetic analysis found it to be most closely related to the extinct Podophorus, also endemic to the Juan Fernández archipelago. This clade was in turn found to be nested within a paraphyletic Festuca, most closely related to F. pampeana of South America.

Several species formerly included in genus Megalachne are now considered synonyms of species placed in other genera:

- Megalachne dantonii Penneck. & Gl.Rojas – synonym of Festuca dolichathera Röser & Tkach
- Megalachne masafuerana (Skottsb. & Pilg.) Matthei – synonym of Festuca masafuerana (Skottsb. & Pilg.) Röser & Tkach
- Megalachne robinsoniana C.M.Peña – synonym of Festuca robinsoniana (C.M.Peña) Röser & Tkach
- Megalachne zeylanica Thwaites - synonym of Eriachne triseta Nees ex Steud.
