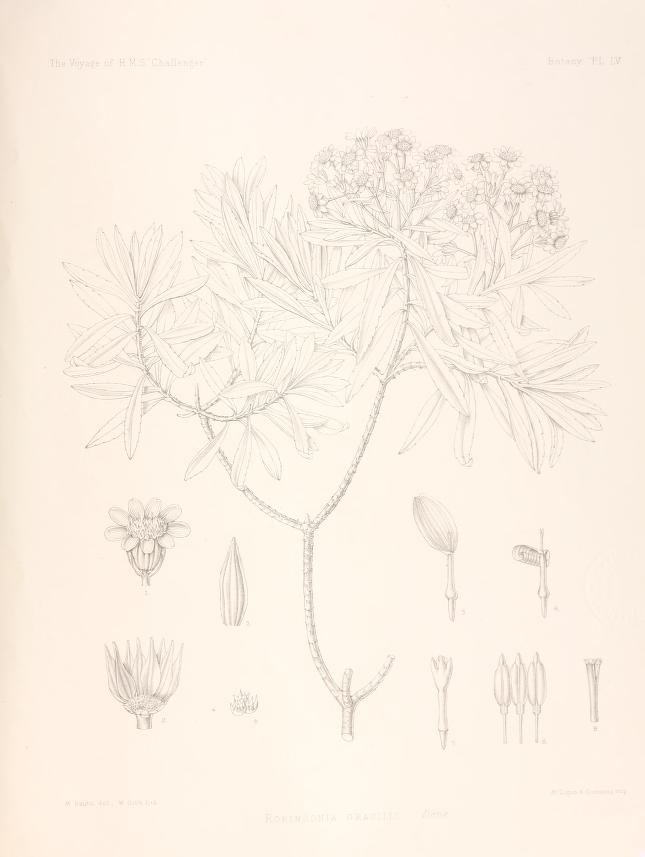
- Robinsonia gracilis

Scientific classification
- Kingdom: Plantae
- Clade: Tracheophytes
- Clade: Angiosperms
- Clade: Eudicots
- Clade: Asterids
- Order: Asterales
- Family: Asteraceae
- Subfamily: Asteroideae
- Tribe: Senecioneae
- Genus: Robinsonia; DC.

Type species
- Robinsonia gayana Decne.

Synonyms
- Ingenhouzia Bertero ex DC.; Rhetinodendron Meisn.; Symphyochaeta (DC.) Skottsb.; Vendredia Baill.

= Robinsonia (plant) =

Genus of plants

Robinsonia is a genus of plants in the groundsel tribe within the sunflower family. All the species are endemic to the Juan Fernández Islands in the Pacific Ocean, part of the Republic of Chile. The genus is named for the fictional character Robinson Crusoe, purportedly shipwrecked in this chain of islands.

== Species ==
Eight species are accepted.

- Robinsonia berteroi (DC.) R.W.Sanders, Stuessy & Martic.
- Robinsonia evenia Phil.
- Robinsonia gayana Decne.
- Robinsonia gracilis Decne.
- Robinsonia macrocephala Decne.
- Robinsonia masafuerae Skottsb.
- Robinsonia saxatilis Danton
- Robinsonia thurifera Decne.
