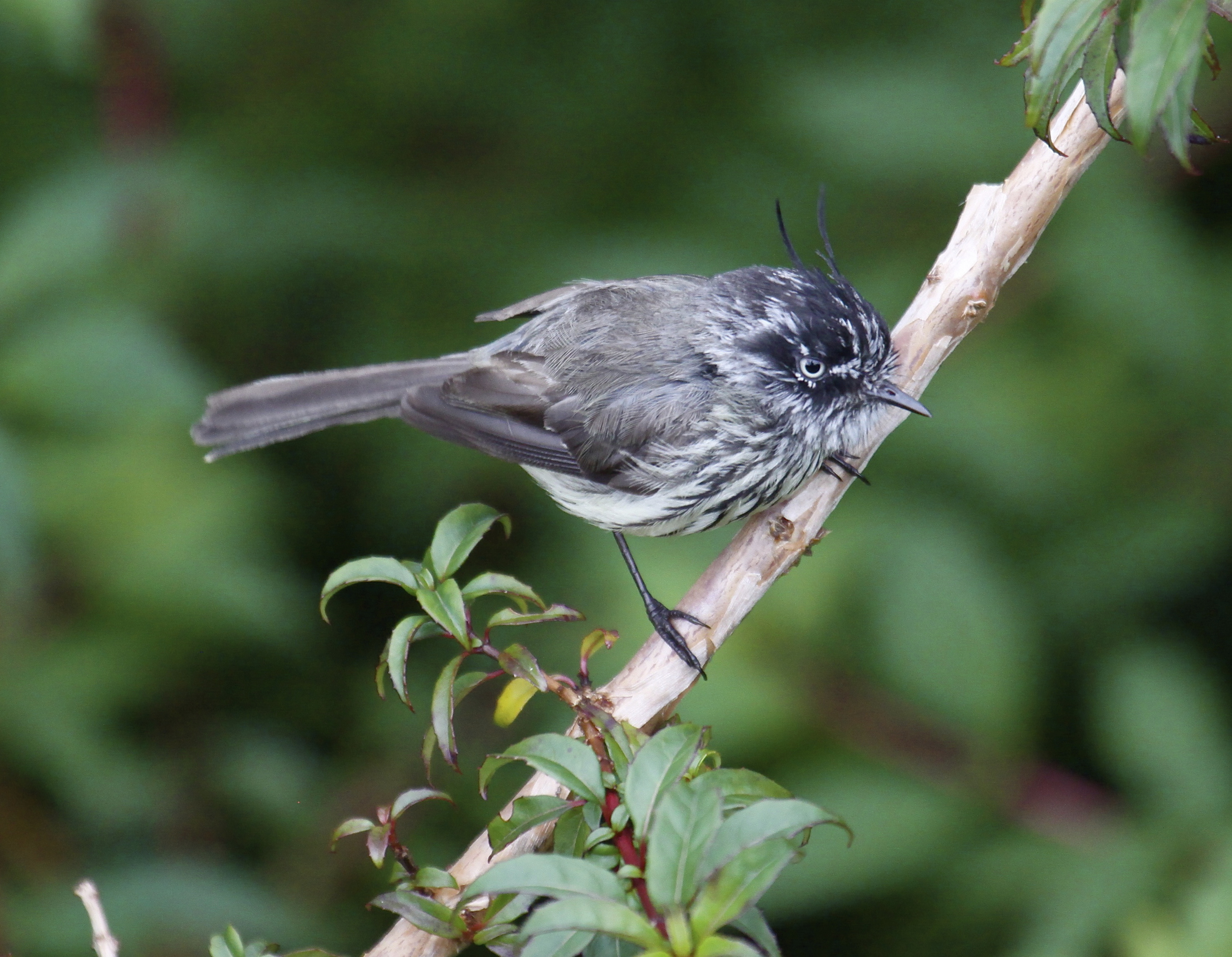
- Tufted tit-tyrant (Anairetes parulus)

Scientific classification
- Domain: Eukaryota
- Kingdom: Animalia
- Phylum: Chordata
- Class: Aves
- Order: Passeriformes
- Family: Tyrannidae

Genera
- Anairetes; Uromyias

= Tit-tyrant =

Tit-tyrants

Group of birds

The tit-tyrants are a group of small, mainly Andean, tyrant flycatchers from the genera Anairetes and Uromyias.

The tit-tyrants are fairly small birds (11–14 cm) that get their common name from the tit family, due to their energetic tit-like dispositions and appearance, primarily in their crests. Tit-tyrants live in temperate or arid scrub habitats and are mainly found in the Andes mountains. It is one of only a few genera of small flycatchers that occur at such high altitudes.

== Species ==
- Anairetes
  - Ash-breasted tit-tyrant, Anairetes alpinus
  - Black-crested tit-tyrant, Anairetes nigrocristatus
  - Pied-crested tit-tyrant, Anairetes reguloides
  - Yellow-billed tit-tyrant, Anairetes flavirostris
  - Juan Fernández tit-tyrant, Anairetes fernandezianus
  - Tufted tit-tyrant, Anairetes parulus
- Uromyias
  - Agile tit-tyrant, Uromyias agilis
  - Unstreaked tit-tyrant, Uromyias agraphia
