= Serpophaga griseiceps =

Serpophaga griseiceps may refer to the birds:

- White-bellied tyrannulet, Serpophaga munda, of which Serpophaga griseiceps is a junior synonym.
- Straneck's tyrannulet, Serpophaga griseicapilla, but formerly commonly referred to by the name Serpophaga griseiceps.
