= List of birds of the Juan Fernández Islands =

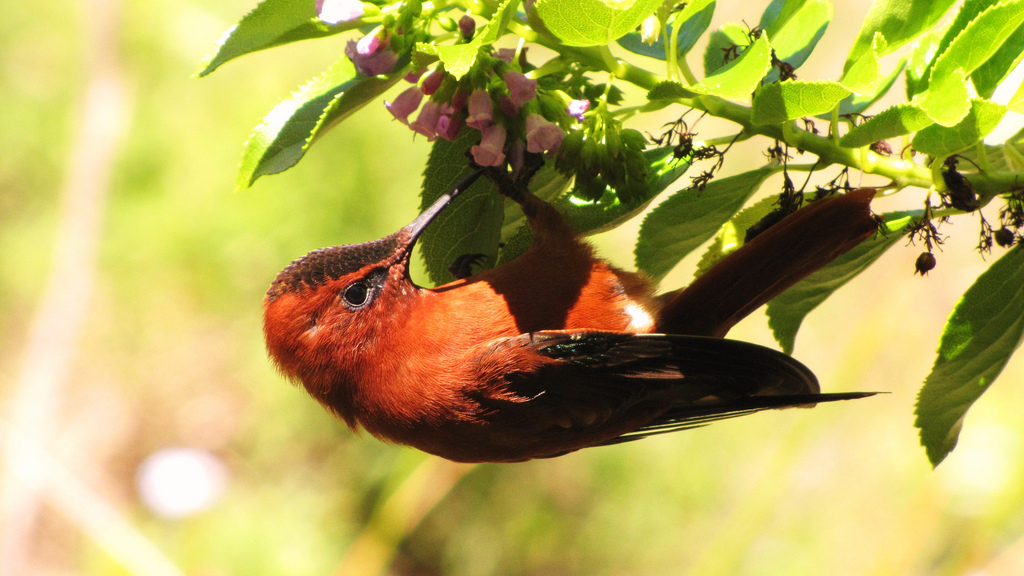
Juan Fernandez firecrown

This list of birds of the Juan Fernández Islands includes species documented in the Chilean archipelago of the Juan Fernández Islands, belonging to the region of Valparaíso, located in the eastern Pacific Ocean. The backbone of this list is provided by Avibase, and all additions that differ from this list have citations. As of November 2024, there are 84 recorded bird species in the Juan Fernández Islands.

The following tags note species in each of those categories:

- (A) Accidental - species not regularly occurring in the Juan Fernández Islands
- (En) Endemic - species that is only found in the Juan Fernández Islands
- (Eb) Endemic breeder - species that only breeds in the Juan Fernández Islands
- (Ex) Extirpated - species that no longer occurs in the Juan Fernández Islands but still occurs elsewhere
- (I) Introduced - species that is not native to the Juan Fernández Islands

== Ducks, geese, and waterfowl ==
Order: Anseriformes Family: Anatidae

- Black-necked swan (Cygnus melancoryphus)
- Coscoroba swan (Coscoroba coscoroba)
- Spectacled duck (Speculanas specularis)

== New World quail ==
Order: Galliformes Family: Odontophoridae

- California quail (Callipepla californica) (I) (Ex)

== Grebes ==
Order: Podicipediformes Family: Podicipedidae

- White-tufted grebe (Rollandia rolland) (A)

== Doves and pigeons ==
Order: Columbiformes Family: Columbidae

- Rock dove (Columba livia) (I)

== Hummingbirds ==
Order: Apodiformes Family: Trochilidae

- Green-backed firecrown (Sephanoides sephaniodes)
- Juan Fernandez firecrown (Sephanoides fernandensis) (En)

== Rails ==
Order: Gruiformes Family: Rallidae

- Spotted rail (Pardirallus maculatus) (A)
- Red-fronted coot (Fulica rufifrons) (A)
- Red-gartered coot (Fulica armillata) (A)

== Oystercatchers ==
Order: Charadriiformes Family: Haematopodidae

- Blackish oystercatcher (Haematopus ater)

== Plovers and Lapwings ==
Order: Charadriiformes Family: Charadriidae

- Black-bellied plover (Pluvialis squatarola)
- American golden plover (Pluvialis dominica)
- Southern lapwing (Vanellus chilensis)

== Sandpipers ==
Order: Charadriiformes Family: Scolopacidae

- Whimbrel (Numenius phaeopus)
- Red phalarope (Phalaropus fulicarius)
- Sanderling (Calidris alba)

== Skuas and jaegers ==
Order: Charadriiformes Family: Stercorariidae

- Long-tailed jaeger (Stercorarius longicaudus)
- Pomarine jaeger (Stercorarius pomarinus)
- Chilean skua (Stercorarius chilensis)
- South polar skua (Stercorarius maccormicki)

== Gulls, terns, and skimmers ==
Order: Charadriiformes Family: Laridae

- Swallow-tailed gull (Creagrus furcatus)
- Kelp gull (Larus dominicanus)
- Brown noddy (Anous stolidus)
- Black noddy (Anous minutus) (A)
- Grey noddy (Anous albivitta)
- Sooty tern (Onychoprion fuscatus)
- Arctic tern (Sterna paradisaea) (A)

== Tropicbirds ==
Order: Phaethontiformes Family: Phaethontidae

- White-tailed tropicbird (Phaethon lepturus)
- Red-billed tropicbird (Phaethon aethereus)
- Red-tailed tropicbird (Phaethon rubricauda)

== Penguins ==
Order: Sphenisciformes Family: Spheniscidae

- Gentoo penguin (Pygoscelis papua) (A)
- Humboldt penguin (Spheniscus humboldti) (A)
- Magellanic penguin (Spheniscus magellanicus) (A)

== Albatrosses ==
Order: Procellariiformes Family: Diomedeidae

- Northern royal albatross (Diomedea sanfordi)
- Southern royal albatross (Diomedea epomophora)
- Buller's albatross (Thalassarche bulleri)
- Salvin's albatross (Thalassarche salvini)
- Chatham albatross (Thalassarche eremita)
- Black-browed albatross (Thalassarche melanophris)
- Waved albatross (Phoebastria irrorata) (A)

== Southern storm petrels ==
Order: Procellariiformes Family: Oceanitidae

- Wilson's storm-petrel (Oceanites oceanicus)
- Elliot's storm-petrel (Oceanites gracilis)
- White-faced storm-petrel (Pelagodroma marina) (A)
- White-bellied storm-petrel (Fregetta grallaria)

== Petrels and shearwaters ==
Order: Procellariiformes Family: Procellariidae

- Southern giant-petrel (Macronectes giganteus)
- Northern giant-petrel (Macronectes halli)
- Southern fulmar (Fulmarus glacialoides)
- Cape petrel (Daption capense)
- Kermadec petrel (Pterodroma neglecta)
- Providence petrel (Pterodroma solandri)
- Juan Fernandez petrel (Pterodroma externa) (Eb)
- Black-winged petrel (Pterodroma nigripennis) (A)
- Masatierra petrel (Pterodroma defilippiana)
- Stejneger's petrel (Pterodroma longirostris) (Eb)
- Phoenix petrel (Pterodroma alba)
- Antarctic prion (Pachyptila desolata)
- Slender-billed prion (Pachyptila belcheri)
- Blue petrel (Halobaena caerulea) (A)
- Grey petrel (Procellaria cinerea)
- White-chinned petrel (Procellaria aequinoctialis)
- Westland petrel (Procellaria westlandica)
- Pink-footed shearwater (Ardenna creatopus)
- Flesh-footed shearwater (Ardenna carneipes)
- Buller's shearwater (Ardenna bulleri)
- Sooty shearwater (Ardenna grisea)
- Manx shearwater (Puffinus puffinus) (A)

== Frigatebirds ==
Order: Pelecaniformes Family: Fregatidae

- Great frigatebird (Fregata minor)

== Boobies and gannets ==
Order: Pelecaniformes Family: Sulidae

- Masked booby (Sula dactylatra)
- Blue-footed booby (Sula nebouxii) (A)

== Cormorants ==
Order: Pelecaniformes Family: Phalacrocoracidae

- Guanay cormorant (Leucocarbo bougainvillii)

== Pelicans ==
Order: Pelecaniformes Family: Pelecanidae

- Peruvian pelican (Pelecanus thagus)

== Herons and egrets ==
Order: Pelecaniformes Family: Ardeidae

- Western cattle egret (Bubulcus ibis)
- Cocoi heron (Ardea cocoi)

== New World vultures ==
Order: Cathartiformes Family: Cathartidae

- Turkey vulture (Cathartes aura)

== Hawks, kites, and eagles ==
Order: Accipitriformes Family: Accipitridae

- Variable hawk (Geranoaetus polyosoma)
- Swainson's hawk (Buteo swainsoni) (A)

== Owls ==
Order: Strigiformes Family: Strigidae

- Short-eared owl (Asio flammeus)

== Falcons ==
Order: Falconiformes Family: Falconidae

- American kestrel (Falco sparverius)
- Peregrine falcon (Falco peregrinus)

== Ovenbirds ==
Order: Passeriformes Family: Furnariidae

- Grey-flanked cinclodes (Cinclodes oustaleti)
- Masafuera rayadito (Aphrastura masafuerae) (En)

== Tyrant flycatchers ==
Order: Passeriformes Family: Tyrannidae

- Tufted tit-tyrant (Anairetes parulus)
- Juan Fernandez tit-tyrant (Anairetes fernandezianus) (En)
- Dark-faced ground-tyrant (Muscisaxicola maclovianus)

== Thrushes ==
Order: Passeriformes Family: Turdidae

- Austral thrush (Turdus falcklandii)

== Old World flycatchers ==
Order: Passeriformes Family: Muscicapidae

- Common redstart (Phoenicurus phoenicurus) (A)

== Old World sparrows ==
Order: Passeriformes Family: Passeridae

- House sparrow (Passer domesticus) (I)

== New World sparrows ==
Order: Passeriformes Family: Passerellidae

- Rufous-collared sparrow (Zonotrichia capensis) (A)

== Icterids ==
Order: Passeriformes Family: Icteridae

- Austral blackbird (Curaeus curaeus) (A)
