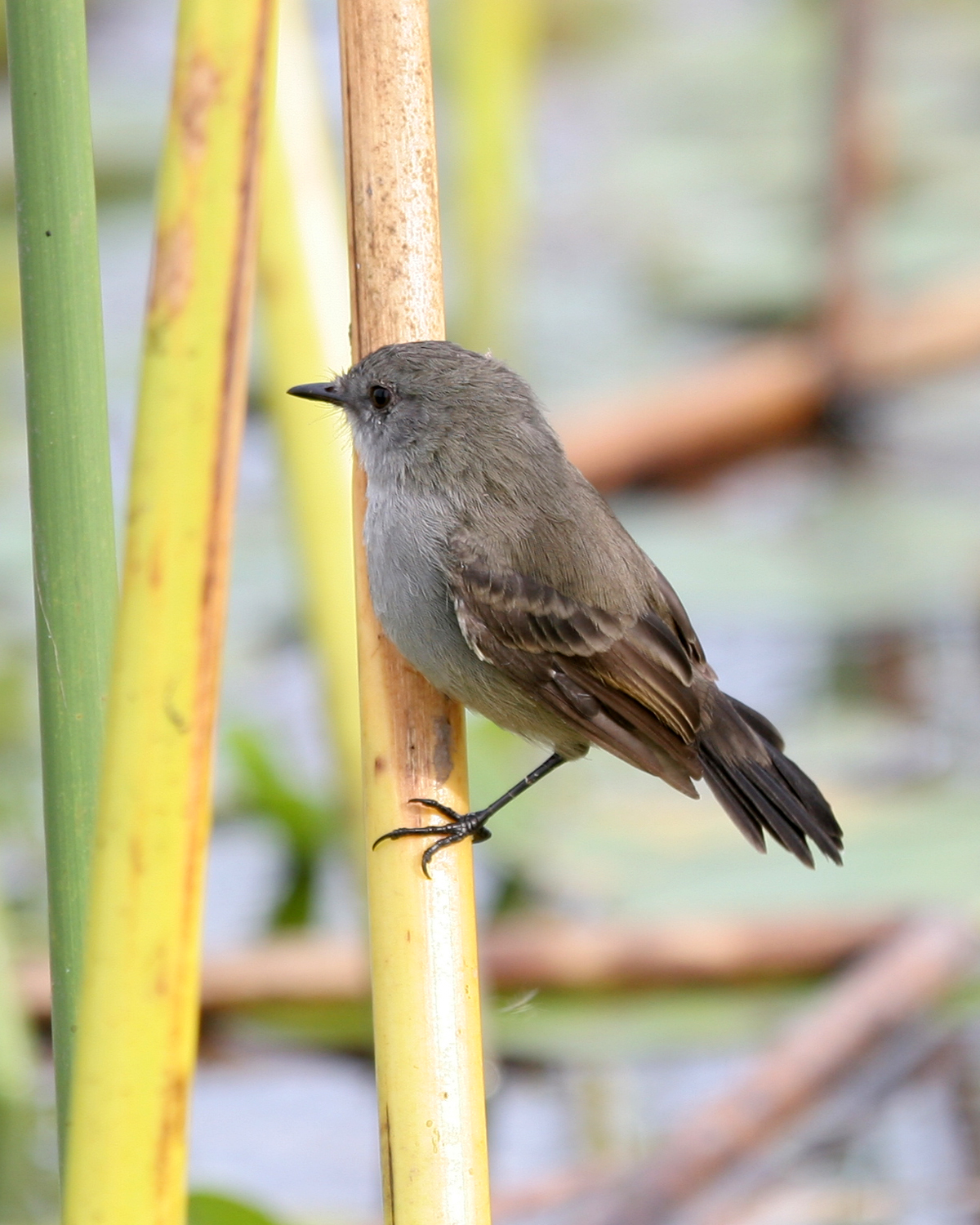
- in Argentina

Conservation status
- Least Concern (IUCN 3.1)

Scientific classification
- Kingdom: Animalia
- Phylum: Chordata
- Class: Aves
- Order: Passeriformes
- Family: Tyrannidae
- Genus: Serpophaga
- Species: S. nigricans

Binomial name
- Serpophaga nigricans (Vieillot, 1817)
- Distribution of S. nigricans Year-round

= Sooty tyrannulet =

Species of bird

The sooty tyrannulet (Serpophaga nigricans) is a species of bird in the family Tyrannidae, the tyrant flycatchers. It is small, usually weighing 9 grams with a length of 12 centimeters, and has gray or brownish-grey feathers with black tail feathers. It is found in Argentina, Brazil, and Uruguay; also southern Paraguay. A small extension of its range is in southeastern Bolivia.

Its natural habitats are subtropical or tropical moist shrubland, rivers, and swamps.

== Taxonomy ==
The sooty tyrannulet was first described by the French ornithologist Louis Pierre Vieillot based on observations by the Spanish military officer Félix de Azara from 1805. Azara gave it the name "Tachuri obscurito menor". In 1817, Vieillot gave it the scientific name Sylvia nigricans. In 1927, the ornithologist Carl Eduard Hellmayr placed the sooty tyrannulet in the genus Serpophaga with the name Serpophaga nigricans. It does not have any subspecies. It was once thought be most closely related to Urich's tyrannulet, however a mitochondrial DNA study has shown that it is most closely related to the torrent tyrannulet.

== Description ==
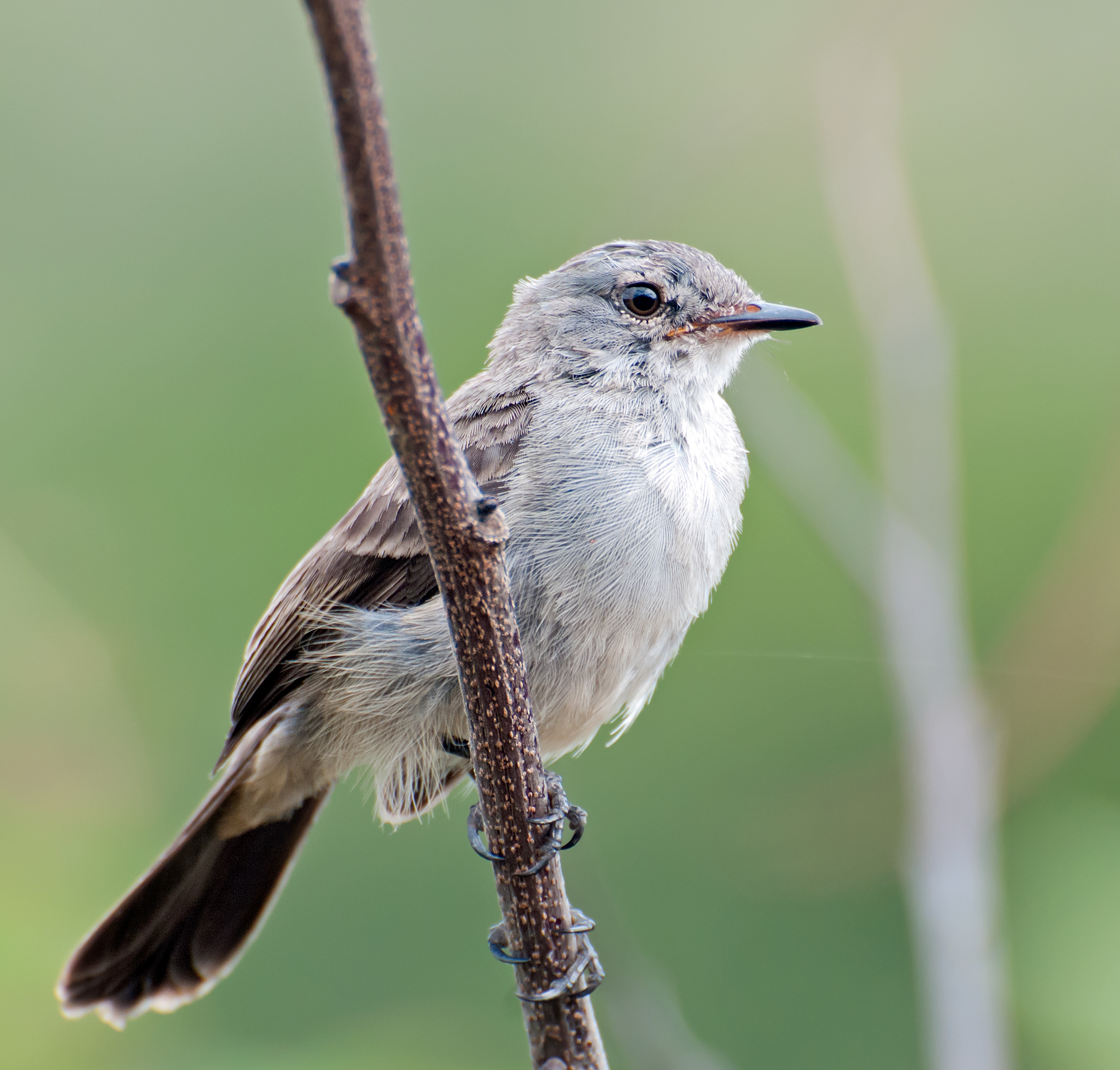
A sooty tyrannulet near São Paulo, Brazil

The sooty tyrannulet is overall a dark grey colour, with a brownish tinge to its upperparts, paler underparts, and the top of its head being somewhat darker. It has a white strip on its crown which is usually only partially visible, and its chin is whitish. On its wings it has two pale grey wingbars, and the flight feathers closest to its body are whitish. Its tail is black. It has brown irises, a black beak, and black legs. There is no difference between males and females, and there the juveniles have not been described. The sooty tyrannulet averages 118–127 mm (4.6–5.0 in) in total length. It has an average tarsus length of 16.8–20.3 mm (0.66–0.80 in), an average beak length of 8.2–9.5 mm (0.32–0.37 in), and an average tail length of 50.5–51.6 mm (1.99–2.03 in).

The song of the sooty tyrannulet is a series of short notes followed by a series of higher pitched notes which have been described as "canary-like". It is also known to make a sharp "teek" call. Breeding pairs have been observed making a series of quiet trills and chatters between each other. A more complex vocalization is also made when an adult is approached by a fledgeling.

== Habitat and distribution ==
The sooty tyrannulet is found in Tarija in southern Bolivia, Paraguay, southern Minas Gerais and Espírito Santo in southeastern Brazil, southern and central Argentina, and Uruguay. Since 2010, it has also been recorded in Tocantins in Brazil, where it had previously never been seen. The sooty tyrannulet is largely non-migratory, although the southernmost populations may migrate north once the breeding season has finished.

The sooty tyrannulet is typically found near streams, rivers, and bodies of water associated with agricultural areas. It prefers brushy areas near these water sources, although it can sometimes be found in forests far away from water. It can be found at elevations up to 1,000 m (3,300 ft) down to sea level.

== Behaviour and ecology ==
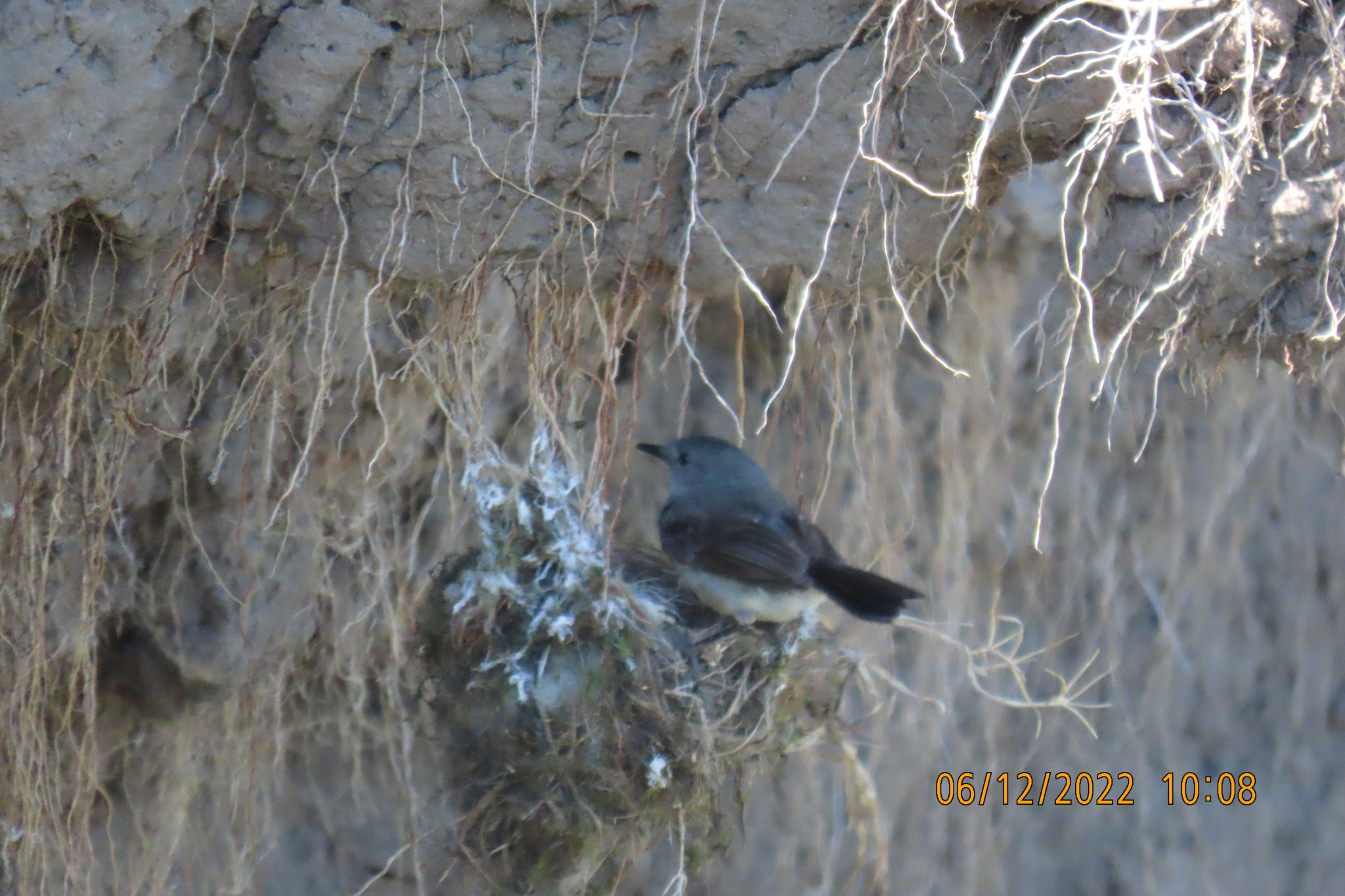
A nest built on a river bank

The sooty tyrannulet feeds on insects. When feeding, it continuously makes small short flights between perches, however it almost never lands on the ground. It darts out into midair to catch insects in flight or from the water surfaces. It often wags its tail while it is foraging.

The sooty tyrannulet breeds between October and December. Both males and females contribute to nest building, and the nest is often built on a branch under an overhang. The sooty tyrannulet may build nests near structures such as bridges. The nest is a 10 cm (3.9 in) deep by 4 cm (1.6 in) cup of densely packed roots and grasses and the cup is lined with feathers. The sooty tyrannulet lays on average three eggs. It is not known how long they incubate their eggs or how long before hatchlings start to fledge. Shiny cowbirds have been observed parasitizing their nests.

== Conservation and status ==
The sooty tyrannulet is considered a species of least concern by the International Union for Conservation of Nature. Although its exact population is unknown, it is considered to be overall stable.
