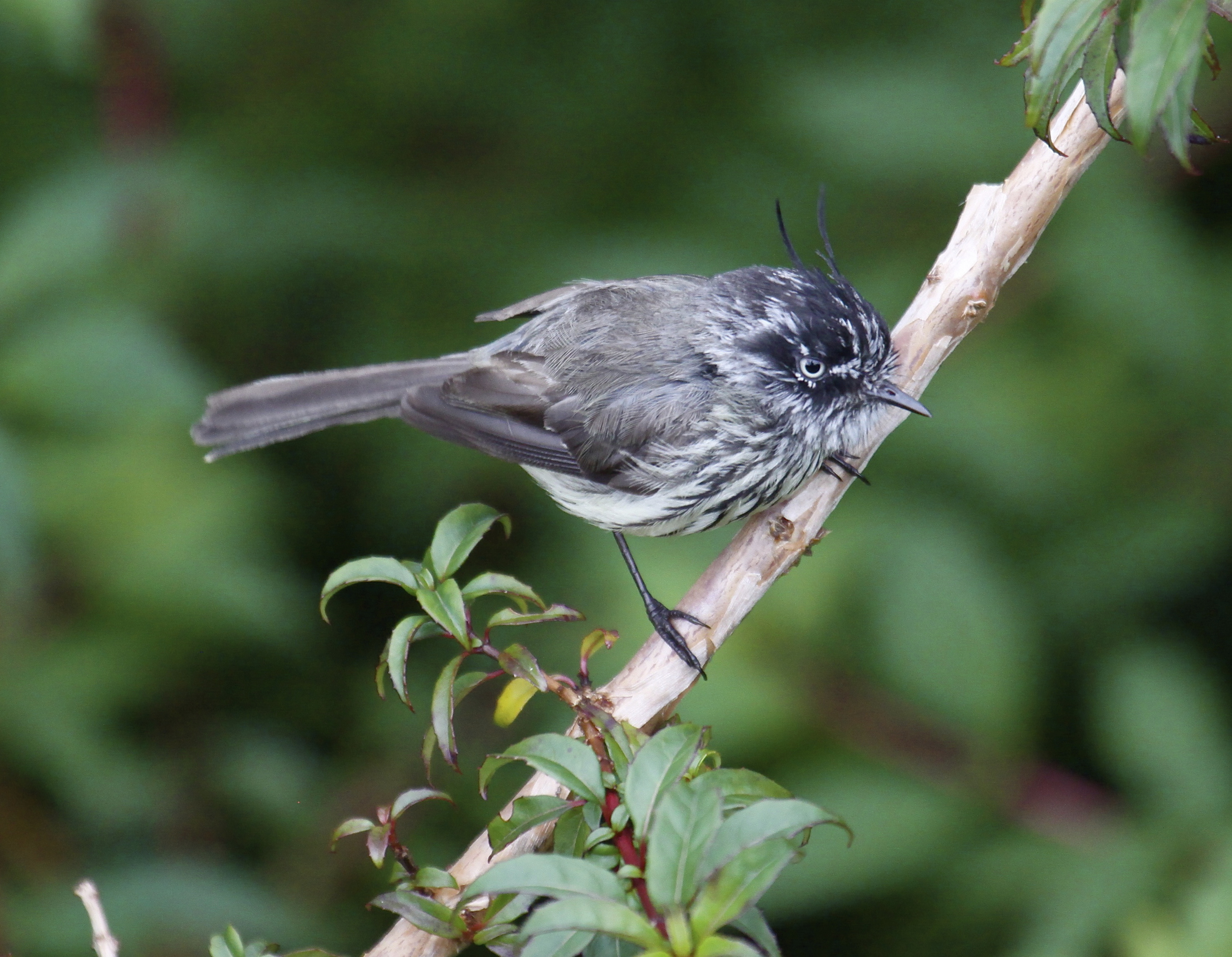

Conservation status
- Least Concern (IUCN 3.1)

Scientific classification
- Kingdom: Animalia
- Phylum: Chordata
- Class: Aves
- Order: Passeriformes
- Family: Tyrannidae
- Genus: Anairetes
- Species: A. parulus

Binomial name
- Anairetes parulus (Kittlitz, 1830)

Synonyms
- Muscicapa parulus Kittlitz, 1830; Spitzitornis parulus (Kittlitz, 1830)

= Tufted tit-tyrant =

Species of bird

The tufted tit-tyrant (Anairetes parulus) is a species of bird in the tyrant flycatcher family Tyrannidae. This species is found in western South America; its range stretches from southern Colombia south along the Andes mountains to Tierra del Fuego. It prefers to live in upper montane forests and shrublands; however, it is a habitat generalist and can be found across a wide range of ecosystems. The tufted tit-tyrant has three subspecies, including the nominate subspecies Anairetes parulus parulus, A. p. aequatorialis, and A. p. patagonicus, and is very closely related to the Juan Fernández tit-tyrant. It is very small with a distinctive and conspicuous crest. The bird's head is black overall with white supraloral and postocular stripes. Its dull grayish-brown back contrasts with its white throat and breast that are covered with black streaks and a pale, unmarked yellow underbelly. There are few noticeable differences in plumage between the subspecies. It is a vocal flycatcher with a broad repertoire of songs.

This tit-tyrant defends its territory only against other tit-tyrants and, except for the southernmost population, is non-migratory. The tufted tit-tyrant feeds mainly on a variety of insects that it hunts on or from small shrubs, typically by perch gleaning. It normally hunts in pairs. The breeding season varies for this bird depending on its geographical location. Two to three eggs are normally laid twice a year in a cup-shaped nest made of root fibers, grasses, and lichens and lined with small feathers. The tufted tit-tyrant is listed as a species of least concern due to its large range and population.

== Taxonomy ==
German explorer Heinrich von Kittlitz described the tufted tit-tyrant in 1830. The tufted tit-tyrant's genus, Anairetes, is in the tyrant flycatcher family Tyrannidae and is believed to be most closely related to the tyrannulet genera Mecocerculus and Serpophaga; however, there is no definitive evidence supporting this claim. The tufted tit-tyrant was described as Muscicapa parulus by Heinrich von Kittlitz in 1830 from a specimen collected near Valparaíso, Chile. It was later moved from the genus Muscicapa, which today solely contains Old World flycatchers, to Anairetes; however, this genus was too similar to the pre-existing genus Anaeretes, so Harry Church Oberholser erected the genus Spitzitornis for it and the other tit-tyrants. However, Spitzitornis was eventually abolished and the tit-tyrants were returned to Anairetes. The tufted tit-tyrant is believed to form a superspecies with the Juan Fernández tit-tyrant. Members of the genus Anairetes are commonly known as tit-tyrants because their active foraging behavior and crests are reminiscent of the true tits in the family Paridae, while the genus itself is part of the tyrant flycatcher family. The tufted tit-tyrant is known in Spanish as the Cachudito, which means "little longhorn" in reference to the bird's crest.

The tufted tit-tyrant has three described subspecies. Anairetes parulus aequatorialis is the northernmost subspecies and is found in the Andes from southern Colombia to western Bolivia and northern Argentina. It was described by Hans von Berlepsch and Władysław Taczanowski in 1884. The nominate subspecies, A. p. parulus, is found in western Chile and in southwest Argentina south to Tierra del Fuego and was described by Kittlitz in 1830. The third subspecies, A. p. patagonicus, is found in western Argentina and was described by Austrian ornithologist Carl Eduard Hellmayr in 1920.

== Description ==
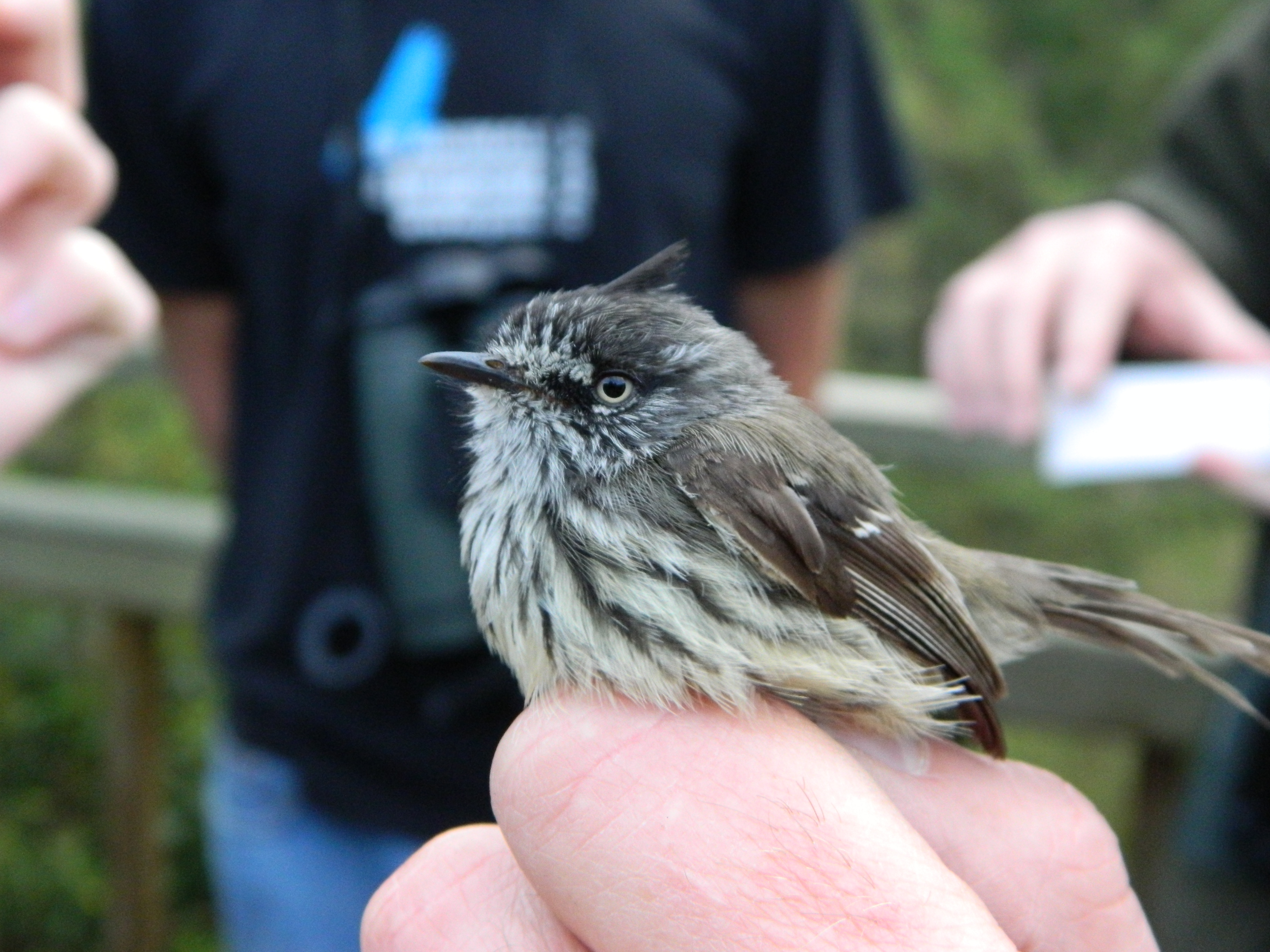
A tufted tit-tyrant, A. p. aequatorialis

The tufted tit-tyrant is a small bird, averaging 9.5 to 11 centimeters (3.7 to 4.3 in) in length and weighing about 6 grams (0.21 oz). Its long, recurved crest is typically conspicuous and is often parted, giving the impression that the bird has two crests. The crest's feathers are black and emerge from the center of the bird's black crown, although occasionally there is a small patch of white hidden by the crest. The head is black overall with a white supraloral and postocular stripe. The bird's iris is creamy white to pale yellow and the bill is black. This tit-tyrant's back is a dull, grayish brown, and the wings and tail are a duskier shade of this color. The wings also feature two narrow white wingbars, while the outer tail feathers are white. The throat and breast are white and covered in dark gray to black streaks, which thin out further down the breast and along the sides. The belly is a pale yellow which fades as the plumage becomes more worn, while the bird's legs are black. Males and females are similar in appearance, although females are typically smaller and may have smaller crests. Juvenile tufted tit-tyrants are duller in coloration and have a shorter crest; the juvenile's wingbars are also buffy and there is no hidden white spot on the crown.

There are few variations in plumage between the three subspecies. Anairetes parulus aequatorialis tends to be browner than the nominate subspecies in its upperparts, with broader and more extensive breast streaks and broader and more distinct white wingbars. A. p. patagonicus has more variation from the nominate subspecies as it is paler gray overall, particularly on the crown, and the wingbars and breast streaks are broader and more distinct. A. p. patagonicus's underbelly is also a paler yellow to white.

This flycatcher has a loud, high-pitched song. It is also known to give a fast chuit-chuit-chuit-chuit-chuit-chidi-didi song, and occasionally single notes of chuit are made in a slow series of calls. When foraging in pairs, tufted tit-tyrants have been observed using a perr-reet call to stay in contact with each other. The species' contact call has been described as a pluit-pluit. The tufted tit-tyrant is also known to give a long, weak trill.

== Distribution and habitat ==
The tufted tit-tyrant has been recorded in Colombia, Ecuador, Peru, Bolivia, Argentina, and Chile. It is mostly restricted to the Andes mountains throughout the northern portions of its range, while in the south its range broadens to include the coast. It has also been recorded as a vagrant in the Falkland Islands. It is the most abundant and widely distributed of the tit-tyrant species.

Its preferred habitat is upper montane forests and shrublands. Despite this preference, it is a habitat generalist and is also found in elfin forest, the edges of cloud forests, Polylepis woodland, brushy forests with Chusquea bamboo, disturbed humid scrub, temperate forests, and dry thorn scrub. It seems to move back into fire-stricken areas at a normal rate for páramo birds, neither colonizing recently burned areas nor waiting for the area to completely recover. This tit-tyrant is most frequently found between 1,800 and 3,500 meters (5,900 and 11,500 ft), though it can be found at sea level in Chile and up to 4,200 meters (13,800 ft) in the Andes.

== Behavior ==
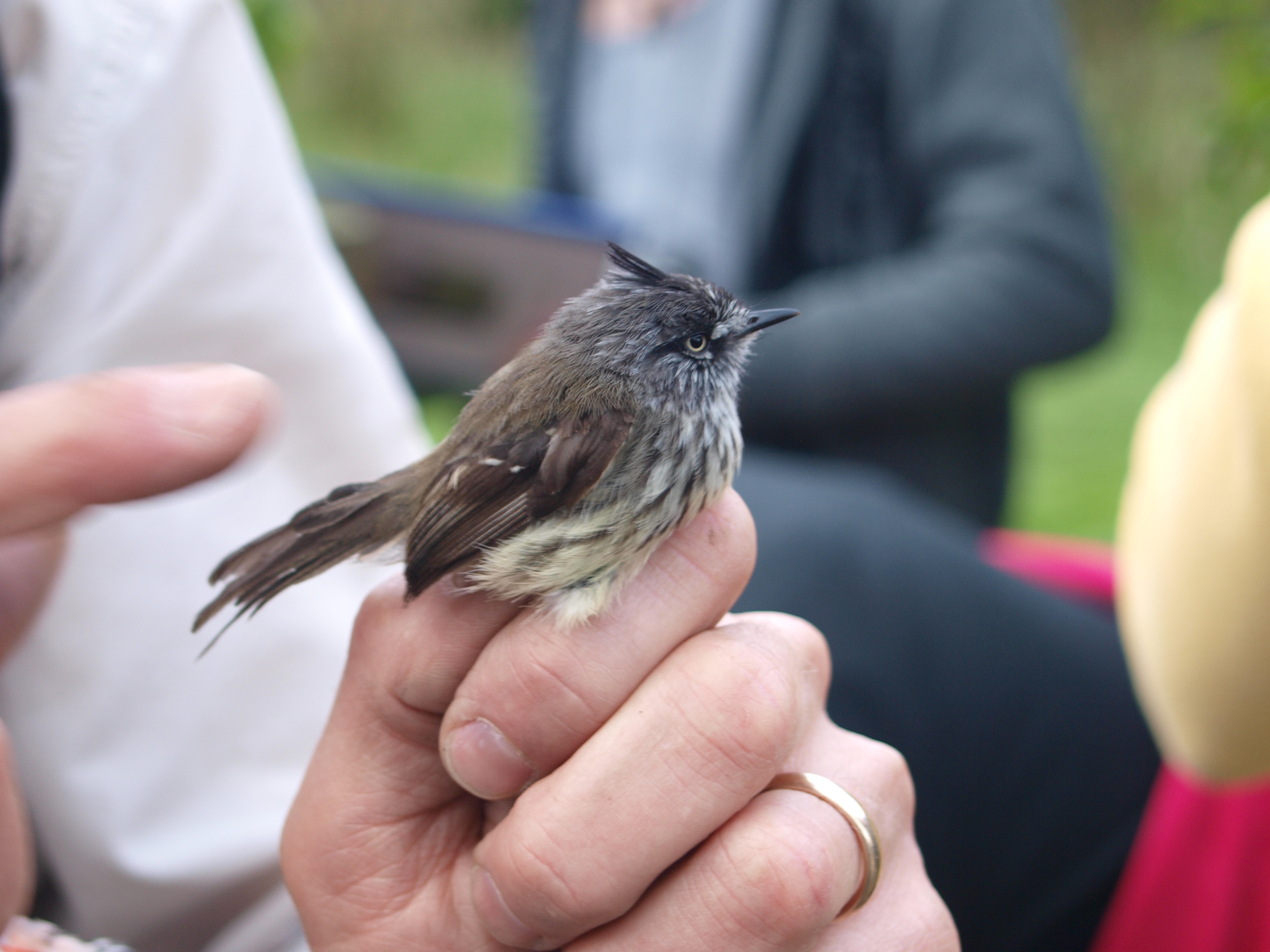
A tufted tit-tyrant, A. p. aequatorialis

This tit-tyrant appears to be territorial in defending what it regards as its feeding territory, although it only displays territorial behavior against other tufted tit-tyrants. Birds defending their territory, either alone or in a pair, tend to begin their defense by calling rapidly and displaying displacement behavior, such as bill wiping or wing flaring. They then raise their crest and chase the other tit-tyrant through the shrubs, occasionally physically attacking the intruder. The victorious tit-tyrant then returns to its normal foraging behavior. The southern subspecies, A. p. patagonicus, migrates to northern Argentina after the breeding season; the other populations appear to be non-migratory.

=== Diet ===
The tufted tit-tyrant is a generalist feeder that eats insects. It is also known to eat seeds in rare circumstances. It is an active forager that hunts in pairs or, after the breeding season, small family groups. It has also been known to feed with mixed-species foraging flocks, although this behavior is abnormal. When this does occur, it is most frequently seen foraging with the thorn-tailed rayadito; flocks of thirty tufted tit-tyrants in these mixed-species foraging groups have been reported. Birds in pairs tend to feed leapfrog style and maintain constant visual contact with each other. This species feeds at all strata of its habitat from the understory to the canopy.

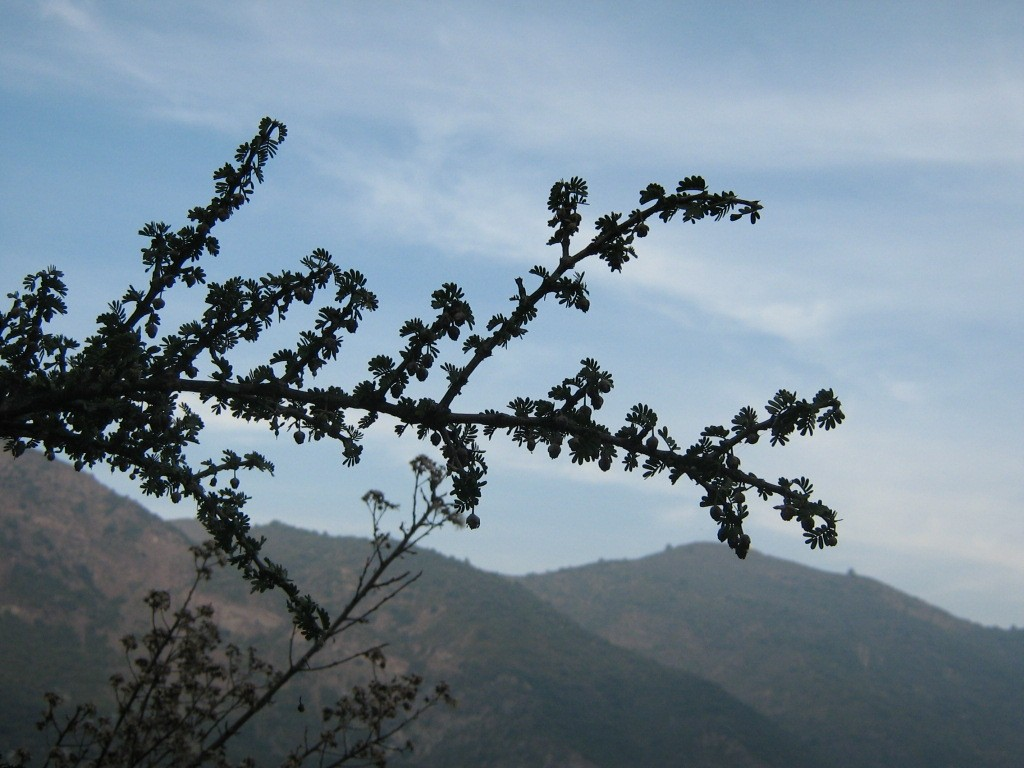
Porlieria chilensis in tufted tit-tyrant habitat

When feeding, this flycatcher makes many short flights from perch to perch, preferring to hunt in shrubs with small leaves, particularly those from the genera Adesmia, Baccharis, and Porlieria. A tit-tyrant tends to land near the base of the shrub and make its way upwards while frequently flicking its tail upwards and shuddering its wings. It has also been observed pivoting on its perch throughout this process. While foraging, the tufted tit-tyrant averages three attacks on prey items per minute. Its feeding style has been compared to that of a kinglet.

The tufted tit-tyrant uses three different hunting strategies to catch its prey. Gleaning insects from a perch is its primary hunting strategy; while gleaning, the bird sits upright with its wings dropped below the tail, which is pointing straight down. From this position the tit-tyrant scans upwards into the vegetation for three to five seconds before attacking, making them surprisingly deliberate hunters for a small flycatcher.

The second most prevalent hunting strategy observed is hover gleaning, in which the tit-tyrant flies upwards from its perch and then hovers midair while grabbing prey from the vegetation. A third and less frequently used strategy is flycatching, in which the bird flies away from its shrub to grab prey in midair. Prey can be grabbed either close to the bird's perch or at a short distance, which often requires the bird to pursue its prey. When pairs flycatch cooperatively, one bird quietly lurks within the shrub while the other snatches nearby insects; after about a dozen attacks, the birds switch positions.

=== Reproduction ===
This flycatcher typically raises two broods a year. The northern populations nest from January to June, while the southern populations nest from August to January. The male tufted tit-tyrant is aggressive during the breeding season, frequently chasing potential rivals in undulating flights while making a whirring sound.

The tufted tit-tyrant's nest is built in shrubs or bamboo, often beside a stream, clearings, or path, and is frequently well hidden. The nest is small and compact, and is made in the shape of an open cup. The cup is made of root fibers, lichens, grasses, and the down of thistles, and small feathers line the interior of the cup. The tufted tit-tyrant's nests are remarkably homogeneous, varying only slightly in composition. Two to three creamy yellow eggs are laid in the nest. The eggs have an average size of 15.1 mm (0.59 in) by 11.8 mm (0.46 in).

== Conservation ==
The tufted tit-tyrant is listed as Least Concern because of its large range of 2,640,000 km^{2} (1,020,000 sq mi) and stable population, which, although not officially estimated, is believed to be well above 10,000 individuals. It is uncommon to locally common throughout its range. This species is considered to have a low sensitivity towards human disturbances in its habitat.
