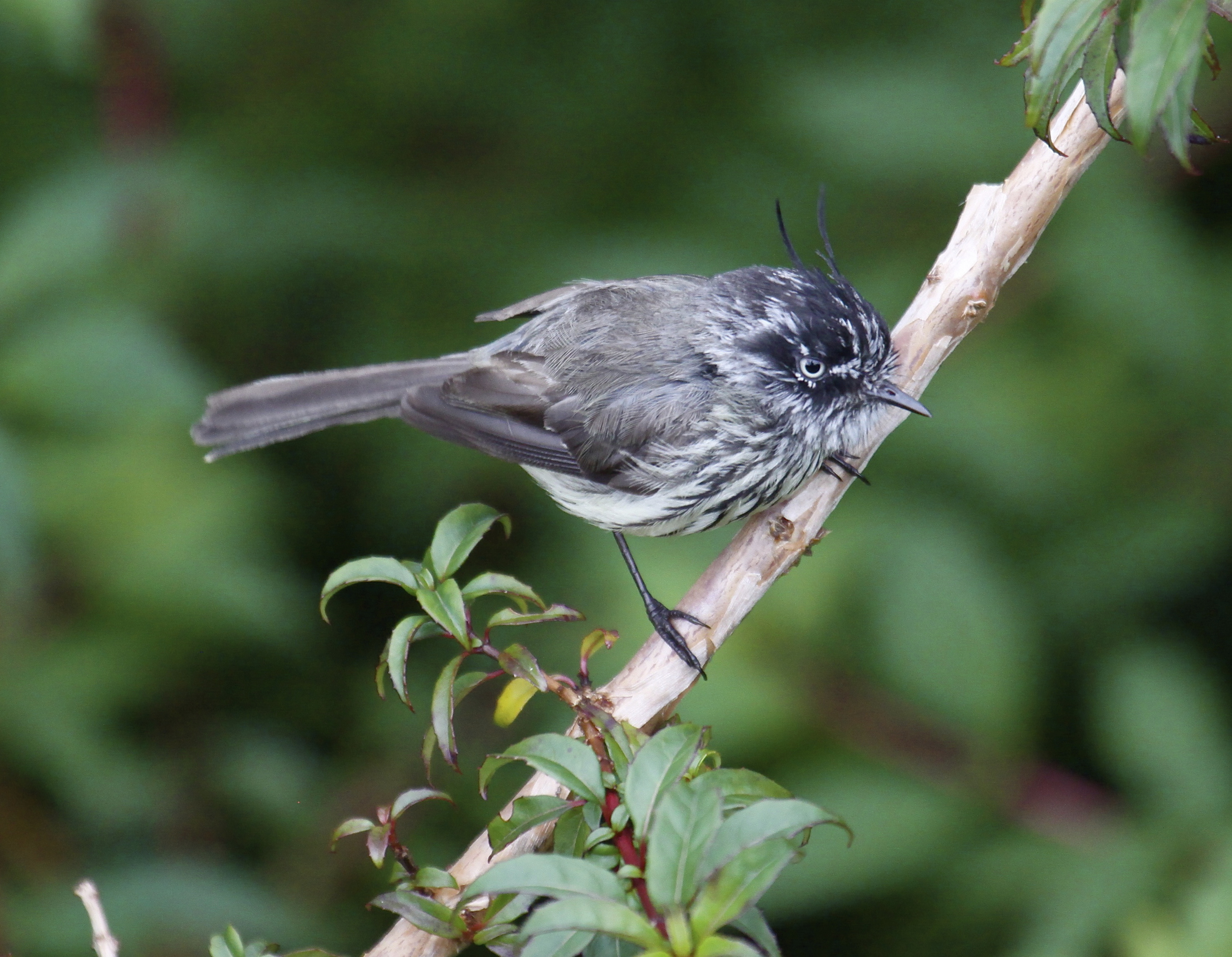
- Tufted tit-tyrant (Anairetes parulus)

Scientific classification
- Kingdom: Animalia
- Phylum: Chordata
- Class: Aves
- Order: Passeriformes
- Family: Tyrannidae
- Genus: Anairetes; Reichenbach, 1850

Type species
- Muscicapa parulus von Kittlitz, 1830

Species
- 6, see text

= Anairetes =

Genus of birds

Anairetes is a genus containing the tit-tyrants, a group of small, mainly Andean birds, in the tyrant flycatcher family Tyrannidae. The group briefly included the genus Uromyias, which had been recognized based on syringeal and plumage characters, including a flatter crest and a longer tail, but was included within Anairetes due to genetic analysis. Recent analyses suggested splitting into Uromyias again. Anairetes is believed to be most closely related to the genera Mecocerculus and Serpophaga; however, there is no definitive evidence supporting this claim.

They are fairly small birds (11–14 cm) that get their common name from the tit family, due to their energetic tit-like dispositions and appearance, primarily in their crests. Species in this genus live in temperate or arid scrub habitats and are mainly found in the Andes mountains. It is one of only a few genera of small flycatchers that occur at such high altitudes.

== Species ==
The genus contains 6 species:

Genus Anairetes – Reichenbach, 1850 – six species
Common name	Scientific name and subspecies	Range	Size and ecology	IUCN status and estimated population
Ash-breasted tit-tyrant	Anairetes alpinus (Carriker, 1933)	Bolivia and Peru.	Size: Habitat: Diet:	EN
Black-crested tit-tyrant	Anairetes nigrocristatus Taczanowski, 1884	Ecuador and Peru.	Size: Habitat: Diet:	LC
Pied-crested tit-tyrant	Anairetes reguloides (D'Orbigny & Lafresnaye, 1837)	coastal Peru and far northern Chile.	Size: Habitat: Diet:	LC
Yellow-billed tit-tyrant	Anairetes flavirostris Sclater, PL & Salvin, 1876	Argentina, Bolivia, Chile, and Peru	Size: Habitat: Diet:	LC
Juan Fernández tit-tyrant	Anairetes fernandezianus (Philippi, 1857)	Juan Fernández Islands in the South Pacific Ocean off Chile.	Size: Habitat: Diet:	NT
Tufted tit-tyrant	Anairetes parulus (Kittlitz, 1830)	Colombia, Ecuador, Peru, Bolivia, Argentina, and Chile.	Size: Habitat: Diet:	LC

== See also ==
- Tit-tyrants
