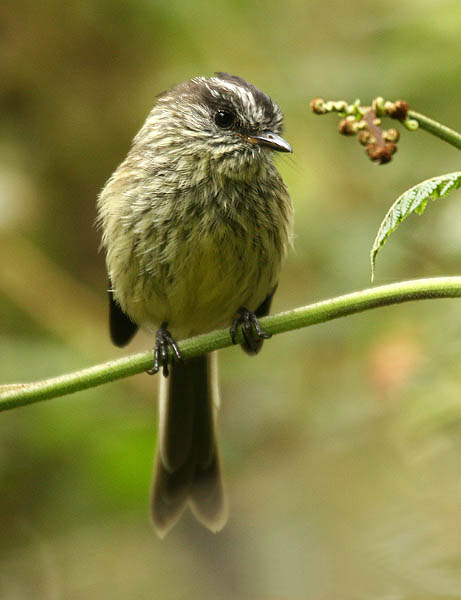

Conservation status
- Least Concern (IUCN 3.1)

Scientific classification
- Kingdom: Animalia
- Phylum: Chordata
- Class: Aves
- Order: Passeriformes
- Family: Tyrannidae
- Genus: Uromyias
- Species: U. agilis

Binomial name
- Uromyias agilis (Sclater, PL, 1856)

Synonyms
- Anairetes agilis

= Agile tit-tyrant =

Species of bird

The agile tit-tyrant (Uromyias agilis) is a species of bird in subfamily Elaeniinae of family Tyrannidae, the tyrant flycatchers. It is found in Colombia, Ecuador, and Venezuela.

== Taxonomy and systematics ==
Some late twentieth and early twentieth century authors merged genus Uromyias into Anairetes but by about 2012 Uromyias had been restored. The agile tit-tyrant shares genus Uromyias with the unstreaked tit-tyrant (U. agraphia) and the two form a superspecies.

The agile tit-tyrant is monotypic.

== Description ==
The agile tit-tyrant is 12.5 to 13.5 cm (4.9 to 5.3 in) long. The sexes have the same plumage. Adults have a flattish black crest and a long tail. They have a brownish black crown, a wide white supercilium, black lores, and a wide dark brown stripe through the eye on a face that is otherwise finely streaked with black and white. Their upperparts are warm brown and heavily streaked with black. Their wings are dark dusky brown with thin whitish edges on the innermost flight feathers. Their tail is dusky with white edges on the outermost pair of feathers. Their throat is whitish with thin black streaks, their breast, flanks, and upper belly are pale yellow with many thin blackish streaks, and their lower belly and undertail coverts are unmarked pale yellow. Juveniles are like adults with the addition of two buffy wing bars. Both sexes have a dark brown iris, a stubby black bill with yellow at the base of the mandible, and dark gray legs and feet.

== Distribution and habitat ==
The agile tit-tyrant has a disjunct distribution. It is found in the Andes of the western Venezuelan states of Mérida (state) and Táchira, in Colombia's Central and Eastern Andes, and in Ecuador 's Andes south to Cotopaxi Province on the west side and to northeastern Loja Province in the east. It inhabits cloudforest and elfin forest near treeline, where it strongly favors areas with pure or mixed stands of Chusquea bamboo. In elevation it ranges between 2,300 and 2,600 m (7,500 and 8,500 ft) in Venezuela, between 1,800 and 3,400 m (5,900 and 11,200 ft) in Colombia, and mostly between 2,600 and 3,500 m (8,500 and 11,500 ft) in Ecuador.

== Behavior ==
=== Movement ===
The agile tit-tyrant is a year-round resident throughout its range.

=== Feeding ===
The agile tit-tyrant feeds on insects. It is an active and acrobatic forager, usually in pairs or small groups and almost always as members of a mixed-species feeding flock. It feeds mostly by gleaning from a perch and with short upward jumps or flights to glean.

=== Breeding ===
The first agile tit-tyrant nest to be described was found in Ecuador. It was woven mostly of Chuysquea bamboo leaves and some moss with a lining of smaller leaf pieces and feathers. It was placed near the top of a 4.8 m (16 ft) tall bamboo stalk in a small stand of the bamboo and was mostly hidden by the leaves it was tucked into. It contained two nestlings which both adults provisioned. The species' breeding season, incubation period, time to fledging, and other details of parental care are not known.

=== Vocalization ===
The agile tit-tyrant's song is "an exiited-sounding, jumble series of 'treerrr' trills and 'tseeyk', 'tsi-dik', or 'tsee' notes". Its call is "a brief soft trill".

== Status ==
The IUCN has assessed the agile tit-tyrant as being of Least Concern. It has a large range; its population size is not known and is believed to be stable. No immediate threats have been identified. It is considered uncommon in Venezuela and locally common in Colombia. It occurs in protected areas in Colombia and Ecuador.
