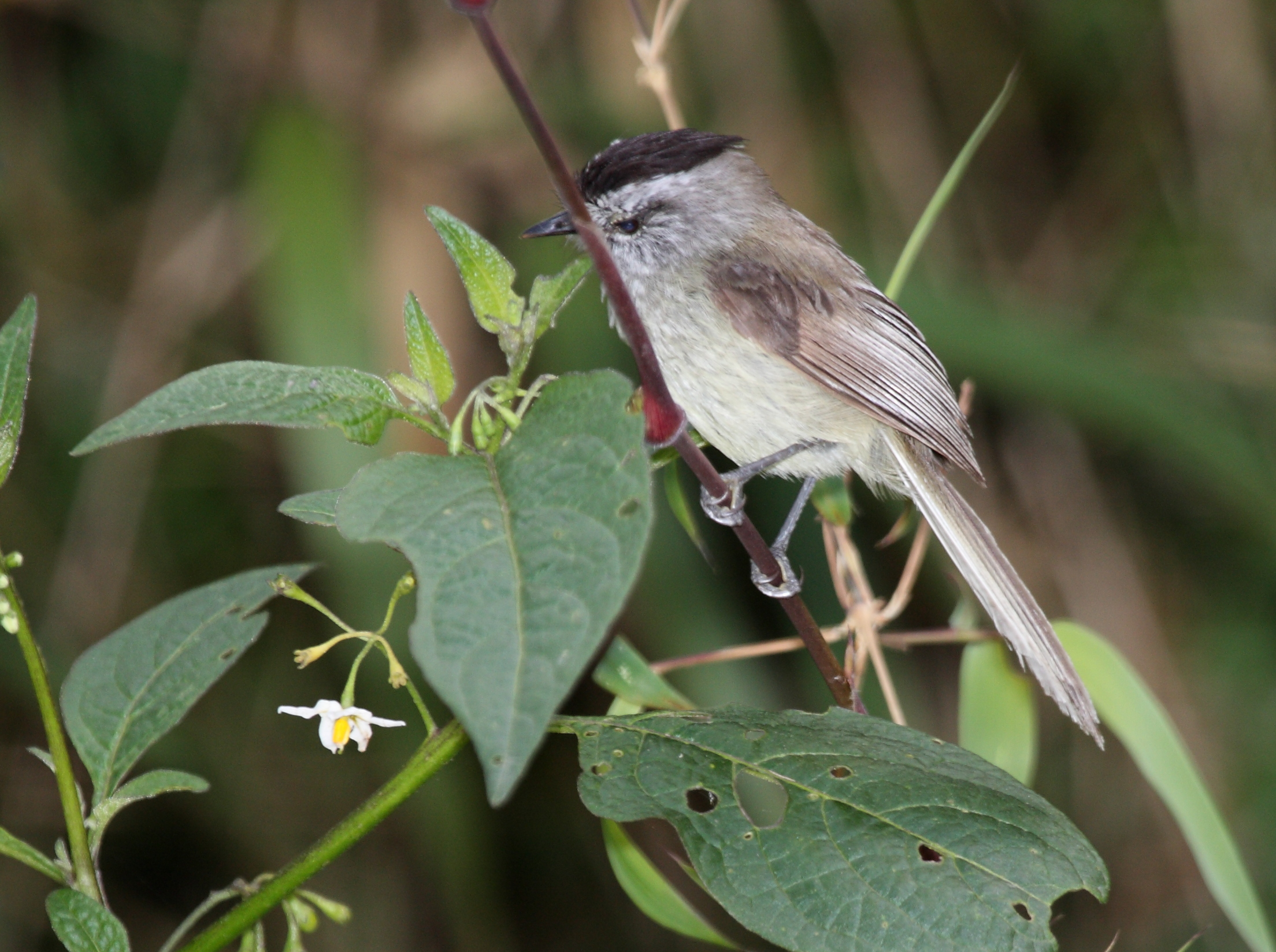

Conservation status
- Least Concern (IUCN 3.1)

Scientific classification
- Kingdom: Animalia
- Phylum: Chordata
- Class: Aves
- Order: Passeriformes
- Family: Tyrannidae
- Genus: Uromyias
- Species: U. agraphia

Binomial name
- Uromyias agraphia (Chapman, 1919)

Synonyms
- Anairetes agraphia

= Unstreaked tit-tyrant =

Species of bird

The unstreaked tit-tyrant (Uromyias agraphia) is a species of bird in subfamily Elaeniinae of family Tyrannidae, the tyrant flycatchers. It is endemic to Peru.

== Taxonomy and systematics ==
Some late twentieth and early twentieth century authors merged genus Uromyias into Anairetes but by about 2012 Uromyias had been restored. The unstreaked tit-tyrant shares genus Uromyias with the agile tit-tyrant (U. agilis) and the two form a superspecies.

The unstreaked tit-tyrant has three subspecies, the nominate U. a. agraphia (Chapman, 1919), U. a. plengei (Schulenberg & Graham, 1981), and U. a. squamiger (O'Neill & Parker, TA, 1976).

== Description ==
The unstreaked tit-tyrant is 12 to 13 cm (4.7 to 5.1 in) long and weighs about 10 g (0.35 oz). The sexes have the same plumage. Adults of the nominate subspecies have a flattish black crest and a long tail. They have a black crown, a gray supercilium with white mottling, and a thin black stripe through the eye on a face that is otherwise gray with some white. Their upperparts are gray-brown with wide but very faint darker streaks. Their wings are fuscous. Their tail is gray-brown with whitish outer edges on the outermost pair of feathers. Their throat and breast are white to light gray with a gray-brown scaled appearance. Their flanks, belly, and undertail coverts are light gray with a pale yellow wash and unmarked. Juveniles have a warmer brown back than adults, two rufous wing bars, buffy edges on the outer tail feathers, and an unmarked pale yellow breast and belly. Adults of subspecies U. a. plengei have dark olivaceous-brown upperparts and tail, no yellow tinge on the breast, and a whiter belly than the nominate. U. a. squamiger has a whiter scale pattern on the breast than the nominate. Both sexes of all subspecies have a dark brown iris, a black bill, and dark slate legs and feet.

== Distribution and habitat ==
The unstreaked tit-tyrant is found along the eastern slope of the Andes of Peru. Subspecies U. a. plengei is the northernmost. It is found in the Cordillera Colán in central Amazonas Department. Subspecies U. a. squamiger is found between eastern La Libertad and Huánuco departments. The nominate subspecies is found on the Cordillera Vilcanota in the upper valley of the Urubamba River in Cuzco Department. The unstreaked tit-tyrant inhabits humid montane and elfin forest, where it strongly favors stands of Chusquea bamboo and forest openings. In elevation the species ranges between 2,600 and 3,450 m (8,500 and 11,300 ft) and is more common near treeline than lower.

== Behavior ==
=== Movement ===
The unstreaked tit-tyrant is a year-round resident throughout its range.

=== Feeding ===
The unstreaked tit-tyrant feeds on insects. It is an active forager, usually in pairs or small groups and frequently as members of a mixed-species feeding flock. It feeds mostly with short upward jumps or flights to glean from foliage and twigs and less often by gleaning while perched.

=== Breeding ===
Nothing is known about the unstreaked tit-tyrant's breeding biology.

=== Vocalization ===
The unstreaked tit-tyrant's song is "a high, sputtering trill: tiii'reeeeeeee" and its calls are "high ti and tsee notes, and a short descending trill".

== Status ==
The IUCN has assessed the unstreaked tit-tyrant as being of Least Concern. It has a large range; its population size is not known and is believed to be stable. No immediate threats have been identified. It is considered rare or "uncommon, perhaps overlooked". "The Unstreaked Tit-Tyrant probably is little affected by human activity, other than from the local effects of habitat loss."
