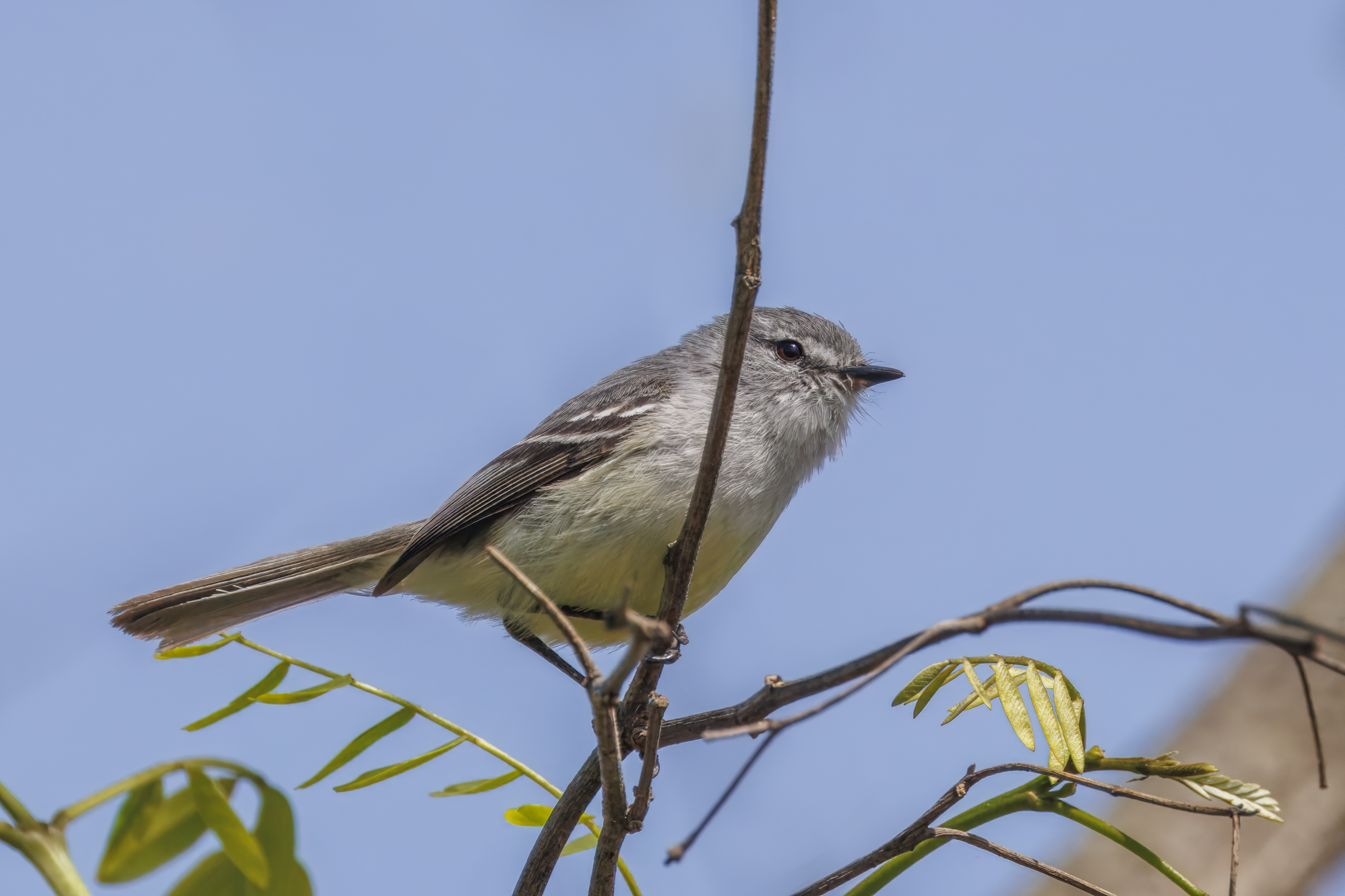
- in Argentina

Conservation status
- Least Concern (IUCN 3.1)

Scientific classification
- Kingdom: Animalia
- Phylum: Chordata
- Class: Aves
- Order: Passeriformes
- Family: Tyrannidae
- Genus: Serpophaga
- Species: S. subcristata

Binomial name
- Serpophaga subcristata (Vieillot, 1817)

Synonyms
- Sylvia subcristata (protonym)

= White-crested tyrannulet =

Species of bird

The white-crested tyrannulet (Serpophaga subcristata) is a small species of bird in the family Tyrannidae, the tyrant flycatchers. It is found in Argentina, Bolivia, Brazil, Paraguay, and Uruguay.

== Taxonomy and systematics ==
The white-crested tyrannulet was originally described as Sylvia subcristata, thought to be a member of what at the time was the Old World warbler family.

The white-crested tyrannulet has three subspecies, the nominate S. s. subcristata (Vieillot, 1817), S. s. munda (Berlepsch, 1893), and S. s. straminea (Temminck, 1822).

Subspecies S. s. munda was originally described as a full species. BirdLife International's Handbook of the Birds of the World lumped it into the white-crested tyrannulet in 2020. The Clements taxonomy followed suit in 2022 as did the South American Classification Committee of the American Ornithological Society and the International Ornithological Committee in 2023. In addition, what is now Straneck's tyrannulet (S. griseicapilla) was long confused with the white-crested tyrannulet but was eventually recognized as a full species based largely on their very different vocalizations.

== Description ==
The white-crested tyrannulet is 11 cm (4.3 in) long and weighs 6 to 8.6 g (0.21 to 0.30 oz). The sexes have the same plumage. Adults of the nominate subspecies have a gray crown and nape with white central crown feathers that are usually hidden but sometimes raised as a crest. They have a thin white supercilium, a white partial eye-ring, and a dusky line through the eye on an otherwise grayish white face. Their upperparts are grayish olive. Their wings are dusky to blackish with pale buffy edges to most of the flight feathers and two whitish to pale buffy wing bars. Their tail is dusky with whitish edges on the outer feathers. Their chin and throat are white, their breast gray, and their belly pale yellow. Juveniles have buff wing bars and little or no white on the crown. Subspecies S. s. straminea is very similar to the nominate but with a brighter yellow belly. S. s. munda is larger than the nominate. Its upperparts are gray with a faint olive tinge, its wing bars are white, and its belly is white with sometimes a faint creamy yellow tinge. Both sexes of all subspecies have a dark brown iris, a black bill, and gray legs and feet.

== Distribution and habitat ==
The nominate subspecies of the white-crested tyrannulet is found from Bolivia's La Paz Department east to southern Mato Grosso in Brazil and south through Paraguay to northeastern Chubut Province in Argentina. Subspecies S. s. straminea is found in Uruguay and eastern Brazil. S. s. munda is found from western Bolivia and Argentina west of straminea and migrates east to north-central Bolivia, southeastern Brazil, and Uruguay. In all seasons the species inhabits a variety of landscapes including the edges of tropical forest, deciduous woodlands, gallery forest, thorn forest, dryish scrublands, cerrado, plantations, gardens, and agricultural areas. In the non-breeding season it tends to prefer the more open landscapes like scrublands and agricultural areas. In elevation it ranges from sea level to 2,800 m (9,200 ft) in Brazil, and up to 700 m (2,300 ft) in Argentina and 2,900 m (9,500 ft) in Bolivia.

== Behavior ==
=== Movement ===
The migration pattern of the white-crested tyrannulet has not been fully defined. The nominate subspecies and S. s. straminea appear to be year-round residents. Subspecies S. s. munda breeds in western Bolivia and western Argentina. It apparently leaves most of that area after breeding and winters to north-central Bolivia and east to the Atlantic in southeastern Brazil and Uruguay.

=== Feeding ===
The white-crested tyrannulet's diet has not been detailed but is believed to be entirely small insects. It is an active forager, flitting around in scrubby vegetation. It takes prey by gleaning while perched and while briefly hovering after a short flight; it also takes some prey in mid-air.

=== Breeding ===
The white-crested tyrannulet breeds between August and January in Brazil and Argentina; its season elsewhere has not been defined. Both sexes build the nest, an open cup tightly woven from grass and other plant fibers with lichens and spider egg sacks on the outside and a lining of feathers and plant wool. The nest is usually well hidden, often in a thorny bush, and placed up to about 6 m (20 ft) above the ground. The clutch is usually two eggs but clutches of three have been found. The incubation period is 13 to 15 days and fledging occurs 13 to 14 days after hatch. Both parents incubate the clutch and provision nestlings.

=== Vocalization ===
The white-crested tyrannulet's song differs somewhat among the subspecies. That of the nominate is described as an "almost mechanical-sounding trill with few introductory rising notes, psee psee psee-e-e-e-e-e-e". It also makes a "slower, bubbly tweetweetweetweetweetwee, and occasionally other, more jumbled chatters". The song of S. s. munda is a "soft, mechanical rattle beginning with a few introductory notes, psee-psee-e-e-e-e-e-e-e-e-e-e-e; it is faster, higher-pitched, and longer than that of the nominate. It also makes a "slower, syncopated tsi, tsu-tsu, tsu-tsu, tsu-tsu and other, more jumbled chatters".

== Status ==
The IUCN has assessed the white-crested tyrannulet as being of Least Concern. It has a very large range; its population size is not known and is believed to be stable. No immediate threats have been identified. It is considered fairly common to common and is found in many protected areas across its range. It "[e]xhibits tolerance of converted habitats within its relatively large range, and is not at any risk".
