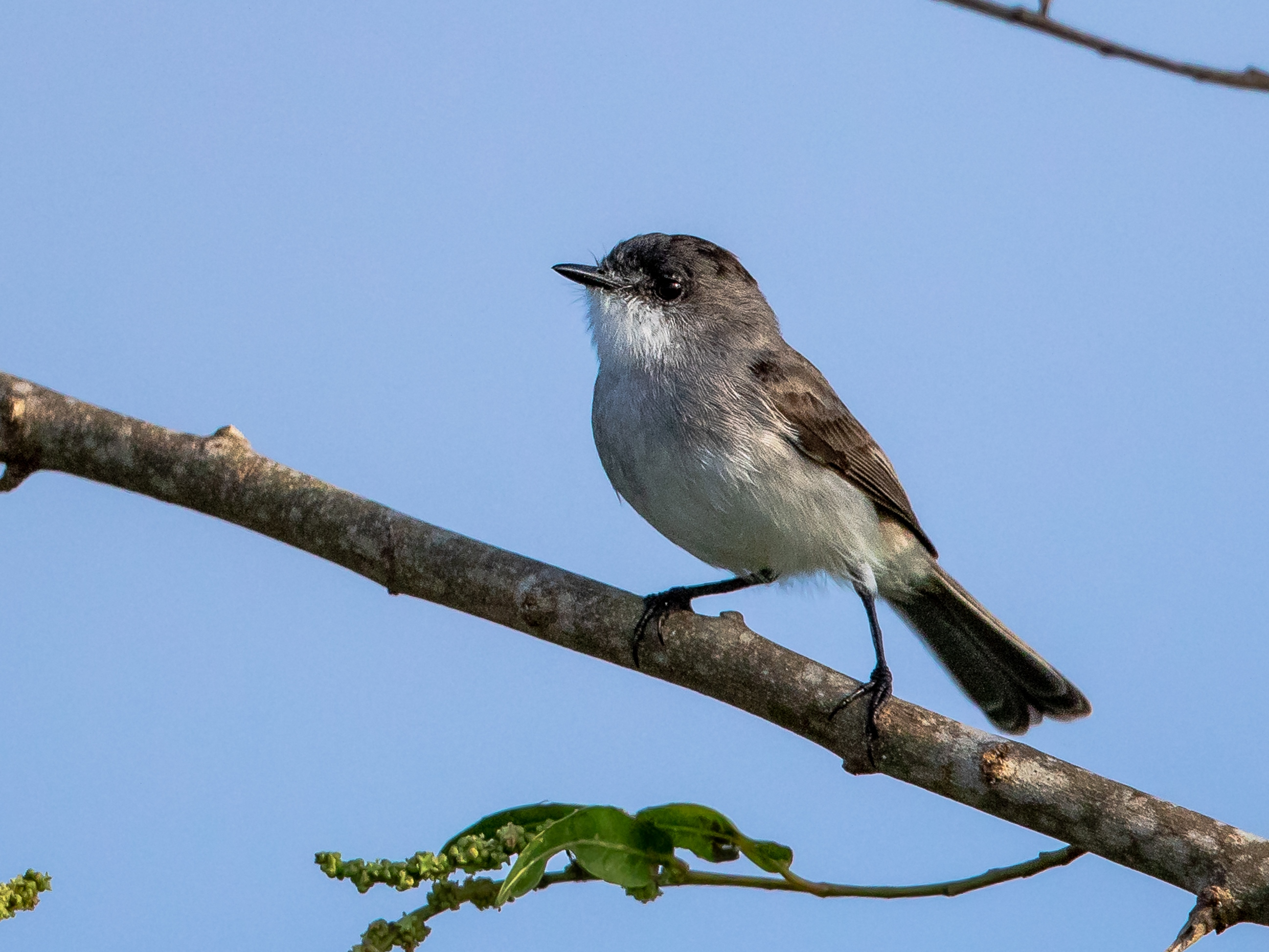
- At Iranduba on the Solimões River, Amazonas state, Brazil

Conservation status
- Least Concern (IUCN 3.1)

Scientific classification
- Kingdom: Animalia
- Phylum: Chordata
- Class: Aves
- Order: Passeriformes
- Family: Tyrannidae
- Genus: Serpophaga
- Species: S. hypoleuca

Binomial name
- Serpophaga hypoleuca Sclater, PL & Salvin, 1866

= River tyrannulet =

Species of bird

The river tyrannulet (Serpophaga hypoleuca) is a species of bird in the family Tyrannidae, the tyrant flycatchers. It is found in Bolivia, Brazil, Colombia, Ecuador, Peru, and Venezuela.

== Taxonomy and systematics ==
The river tyrannulet has three subspecies, the nominate S. h. hypoleuca (Sclater, PL & Salvin, 1866), S. h. venezuelana (Zimmer, JT, 1940), and S. h. pallida (Snethlage, E, 1907).

== Description ==
The river tyrannulet is 10.5 to 12.5 cm (4.1 to 4.9 in) long and weighs 5.5 to 6.7 g (0.19 to 0.24 oz). The sexes have the same plumage. Adults of the nominate subspecies have a gray forehead and a black crown with white central feathers that are usually hidden; the black extends as a flat crest. They have white lores, a white partial eye-ring, and a black line through the eye on an otherwise white face. Their upperparts are brownish gray. Their wings are dusky brownish gray and their tail long and dusky. Their chin, throat, and underparts are white with a pale gray tinge across the breast. Subspecies S. h. venezuelana is smaller and paler than the nominate with less black on its crown. S. h. pallida is also paler than the nominate, with less black on its crown and almost no gray tinge on the breast. Juveniles are like adults. Both sexes of all subspecies have a dark brown iris, a black bill, and dark gray legs and feet.

== Distribution and habitat ==
The river tyrannulet has a disjunct distribution on two major South American river corridors. Subspecies S. h. venezuelana has the smallest range and is separated from the other two subspecies. It is found primarily in Venezuela, along the middle and lower Orinoco River and its tributaries the Meta and Apure rivers. It is found on the Meta in far eastern Vichada Department of Colombia as well. The other two subspecies have contiguous ranges along the Amazon and many of its tributaries. The nominate is found along the Putumayo River on the southeastern Colombia-northeastern Peru border, along the Napo and Pastaza rivers from Ecuador to their confluences with the Marañon River in Peru, along the Ucayali River to the Marañon in Peru, along the Marañon from Peru to the Amazon in Brazil, along the Madre de Dios River from Peru across northern Bolivia to the Madeira River in Brazil and the Madeira to the Amazon, and along the upper and middle Amazon approximately to the Madeira. Subspecies S. h. pallida is found in Brazil, along the lower Amazon and the lower reaches of the Tapajós and Tocantins rivers.

The river tyrannulet inhabits low-stature and sparse early-successional scrub on river islands and the "mainland" river edges. In eastern Colombia and western Venezuela it occurs in scrubby and thorny areas along watercourses in the Llanos. In elevation it occurs mostly from sea level to 200 m (660 ft), though locally higher, in Brazil. It reaches 200 m (660 ft) in Venezuela, 350 m (1,150 ft) in Colombia, and 400 m (1,300 ft) in Ecuador.

== Behavior ==
=== Movement ===
The river tyrannulet is generally a year-round resident but may make some seasonal movements responding to changes in water level.

=== Feeding ===
The river tyrannulet feeds on insects. It forages alone, in pairs, or in family groups, actively and restlessly moving through shrubs and young trees. It captures prey mostly by gleaning while perched but also while briefly hovering after a short flight, and only rarely makes captures in flight.

=== Breeding ===
The river tyrannulet breeds between June and October in Colombia and appears to have a similar season in Venezuela. Its breeding season is unknown elsewhere. Its nest is a delicate open cup woven of thin grass and spiderweb and lined with feathers. It is typically placed in a fork between a branch and main stem of a shrub about 0.5 m (1.5 ft) above the ground. The clutch is two buff-white eggs. The incubation period, time to fledging, and details of parental care are not known.

=== Vocalization ===
The river tyrannulet sings a "series of very high, strong, hurried, happy-sounding twitters". It has been written as "chip-skéép-pf-t-t-t-t-t-t-t-et-et-et-chip-chip" or "d-d-d-r-r-re-re-re-reet?". Pairs sing a duet of " 'p'dit-p'dit-p'dt' or 'pikup, pikup, pikup' ". While foraging it makes "see-blik" or "pit-chick" calls.

== Status ==
The IUCN has assessed the river tyrannulet as being of Least Concern. It has a very large range; its population size is not known and is believed to be stable. No immediate threats have been identified. It is considered "very local" in Colombia, "scarce and local" in Ecuador, "rare to uncommon" in Peru, and "uncommon and local" in Venezuela. It occurs in a few protected areas.
