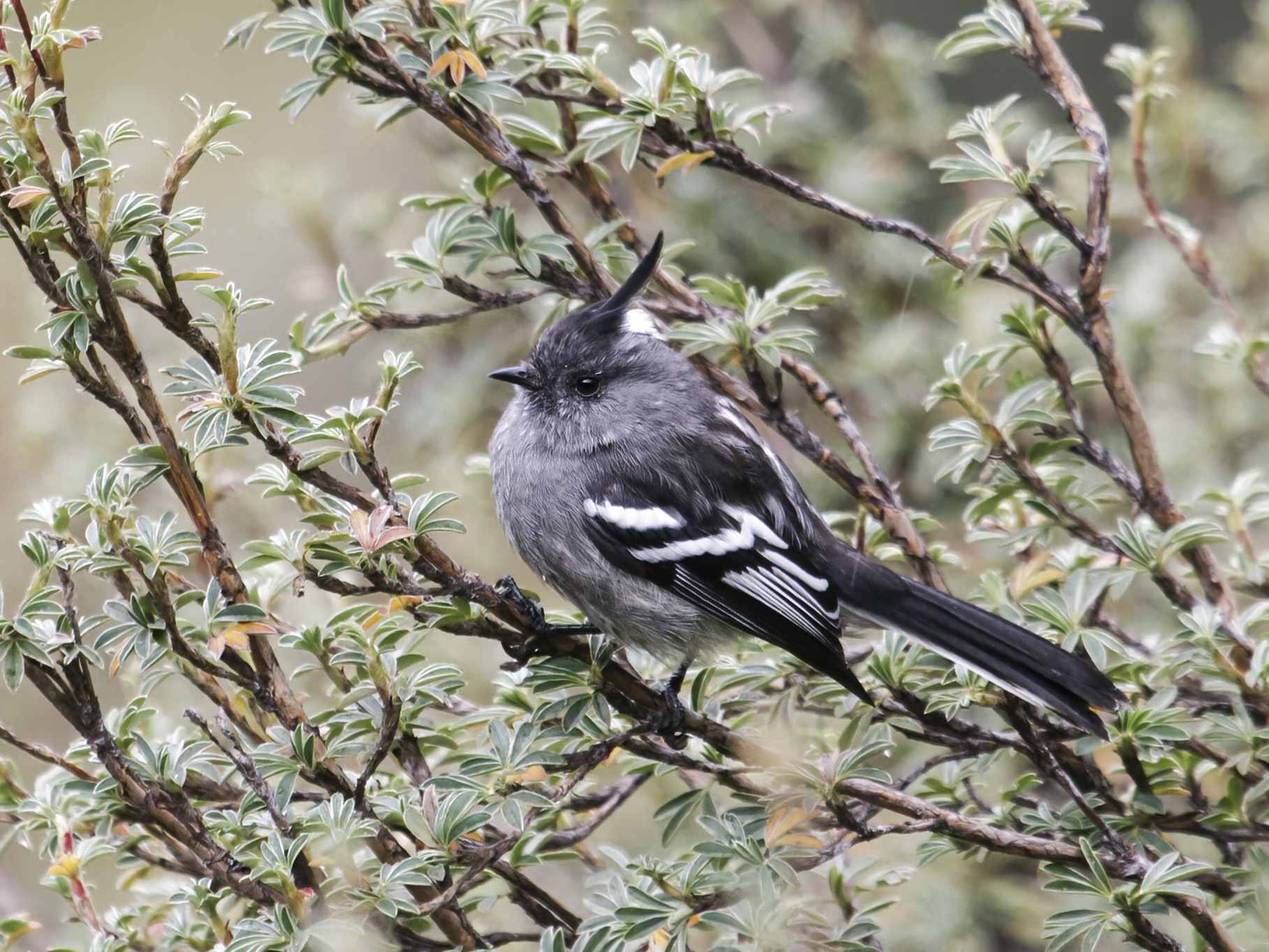

Conservation status
- Vulnerable (IUCN 3.1)

Scientific classification
- Kingdom: Animalia
- Phylum: Chordata
- Class: Aves
- Order: Passeriformes
- Family: Tyrannidae
- Genus: Anairetes
- Species: A. alpinus

Binomial name
- Anairetes alpinus (Carriker, 1933)

= Ash-breasted tit-tyrant =

Species of bird

The ash-breasted tit-tyrant (Anairetes alpinus) is a vulnerable species of bird in subfamily Elaeniinae of family Tyrannidae, the tyrant flycatchers. It is found in Bolivia and Peru.

== Taxonomy and systematics ==
The members of genus Anairetes are known commonly as tit-tyrants because their active foraging behavior and crests are reminiscent of the true tits in the family Paridae. The genus had formerly been named Spizitornis.

The ash-breasted tit-tyrant was originally described in the monotypic genus Yanacea which was later merged into Anairetes.

The ash-breasted tit-tyrant has two subspecies, the nominate A. a. alpinus (Carriker, 1933) and A. a. bolivianus (Carriker, 1935).

== Description ==
The ash-breasted tit-tyrant is 13 to 13.5 cm (5.1 to 5.3 in) long; one female weighed 10 g (0.35 oz). The sexes have the same plumage. Adults have a blackish crest formed by elongated feathers on the sides of the crown. The rest of their crown is white and the rest of their head is dark gray. Their upperparts are soft gray with faint blackish streaks. Their wings are blackish with whitish edges on the inner flight feathers. Their wing coverts have wide white tips that show as two bars on the closed wing. Their tail is black on top and mostly white underneath. Their breast and flanks are soft gray and their belly and undertail coverts are whitish to very faint yellow. Subspecies A. a. bolivianus has a blacker crown and whiter belly than the nominate. Both sexes of both subspecies have a hazel iris, a black bill, and black legs and feet.

== Distribution and habitat ==
The ash-breasted tit-tyrant has a highly disjunct distribution in the Andes of Peru and Bolivia. The nominate subspecies is found on the western slope in the northern Peruvian departments of La Libertad, Ancash, and Lima. Subspecies A. a. bolivianus is found in southeastern Peru's Cuzco and Apurímac departments and in La Paz Department in northwestern Bolivia. The species inhabits groves and thickets dominated by Polylepis and Gynoxys trees and shrubs on steep, rocky, grassy slopes. In elevation it ranges from 3,700 to 4,600 m (12,100 to 15,100 ft).

== Behavior ==
=== Movement ===
The ash-breasted tit-tyrant is a year-round resident throughout its range.

=== Feeding ===
The ash-breasted tit-tyrant's diet has not been detailed but is known to be mostly insects. It forages singly, in pairs, or in small family groups, and sometimes with mixed-species feeding flocks. It mostly feeds among the outer branches of Polylepis and Gynoxys, usually by gleaning while perched and with short sallies to briefly hover. It also rarely drops to the ground or climbs trunks.

=== Breeding ===
Almost nothing is known about the ash-breasted tit-tyrant's breeding biology. An active nest was discovered in November and dependent young have been seen in December, suggesting that its breeding season is towards the end of the dry season.

=== Vocalization ===
What is thought to be the ash-breasted tit-tyrant's song is "a rising burry note followed by short, descending notes: breeee djr-djr-djr". Its calls are "a plaintive feeet, a short soft trill, and pip or peep notes".

== Status ==
The IUCN originally in 1988 assessed the ash-breasted tit-tyrant as Threatened and since 2025 as vulnerable. It has a small and severely fragmented range and its estimated population of between 150 and 700 mature individuals is believed to be decreasing. It is known from an estimated two to 100 sites scattered within its approximately 200,000 km^{2} (77,000 sq mi) overall range. "The main threats are heavy grazing (especially in Ancash) and the uncontrolled use of fire, which combine to prevent Polylepis regeneration, especially where cutting for timber, firewood and charcoal also occurs." Grazing by sheep and cattle, which have often replaced Camelids, is a contributing threat. The species is considered very local and uncommon. It occurs in at least three national parks in Peru and one in Bolivia, though it is very rare in Huascarán National Park. Active conservation efforts are being made in Bolivia by Asociación Civil Armonía with the help of the Critical Ecosystem Partnership Fund.
