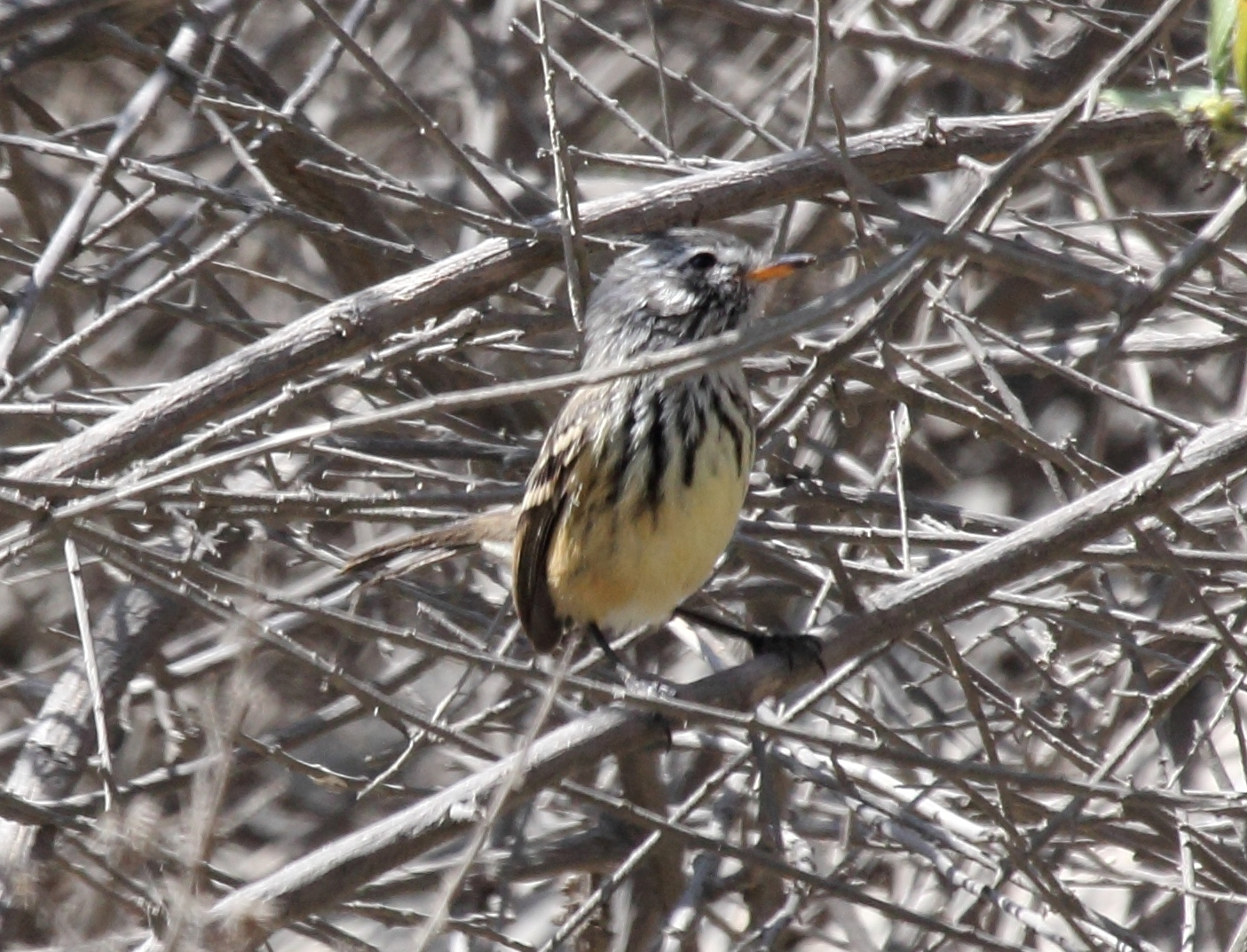
- An example in Peru

Conservation status
- Least Concern (IUCN 3.1)

Scientific classification
- Kingdom: Animalia
- Phylum: Chordata
- Class: Aves
- Order: Passeriformes
- Family: Tyrannidae
- Genus: Anairetes
- Species: A. flavirostris

Binomial name
- Anairetes flavirostris Sclater, PL & Salvin, 1876
- Non-Breeding Year-round

= Yellow-billed tit-tyrant =

Species of bird

The yellow-billed tit-tyrant (Anairetes flavirostris) is a species of bird in subfamily Elaeniinae of family Tyrannidae, the tyrant flycatchers. It is found in Argentina, Bolivia, Chile, Peru, and as a vagrant in Uruguay.

== Taxonomy and systematics ==
The members of genus Anairetes are known commonly as tit-tyrants because their active foraging behavior and crests are reminiscent of the true tits in the family Paridae. The genus had formerly been named Spizitornis.

The yellow-billed tit-tyrant has these four subspecies:

- A. f. huancabambae (Chapman, 1924)
- A. f. arequipae (Chapman, 1926)
- A. f. cuzcoensis (Chapman, 1924)
- A. f. flavirostris Sclater, PL & Salvin, 1876

== Description ==
The yellow-billed tit-tyrant is 10 to 12 cm (3.9 to 4.7 in) long and weighs 6 to 7 g (0.21 to 0.25 oz). The sexes have the same plumage. Adults of the nominate subspecies A. f. flavirostris have a blackish split crest formed by elongated feathers on the sides of the crown. Their forecrown is dusky gray with faint white streaks, the rest of their crown is white, their supercilium is white, and the rest of their face is white with bold black streaks. Their upperparts are medium gray-brown with faint blackish streaks. Their wings are blackish with buffy white tips and edges on the inner flight feathers. Their wing coverts have cinnamon-buff tips that show as two bars on the closed wing. Their tail is dusky brownish with paler outer webs on the outermost pair of feathers and paler tips on the others. Their throat, breast, and upper belly are white with bold black streaks and their flanks, lower belly, and undertail coverts are unmarked yellowish. Juveniles have a shorter crest than adults and are duller, more buffy, and not as strongly streaked.

Subspecies A. f. huancabambae has more white in the crown than the nominate; its back is dark brown with strong blackish streaks and their tail feather have white edges and tips where the nominate is pale brownish. A. f. arequipae's tail feathers have dull brownish edges and tips only slightly paler than the rest of the tail; its belly is less yellowish than the nominate's. A. f. cuzcoensis is the largest subspecies and has the least amount of white on its crown. Its back is darker brown and more heavily streaked than the nominate's and its breast has wider and darker streaks. Both sexes of all subspecies have a dark brown iris, a black maxilla, a yellow mandible with a black outer half or tip, and slate-gray to black legs and feet.

== Distribution and habitat ==
The nominate subspecies of the yellow-billed tit-tyrant is the southernmost of the four. It is found in the Andes of Bolivia and western Argentina as far south as Chubut Province and east to Buenos Aires and Entre Ríos provinces. Subspecies A. f. huancabambae is found in the Andes of northern Peru from Piura and Cajamarca departments south to Ancash and Huánuco. A. f. arequipae is found on the western slope of the Andes from Peru's Lima Department south into northwestern Chile's Arica and Tarapacá regions. A. f. cuzcoensis is known only in Peru's Cuzco Department but its range might extend north to Junín Department. In addition, the South American Classification Committee of the American Ornithological Society has records showing the nominate subspecies as a vagrant in Uruguay.

The yellow-billed tit-tyrant inhabits a variety of dryish semi-open to open landscapes. These include dry montane and desert scrublands, thorn scrub, semi-arid brush, and somewhat humid woodlands dominated by Polylepis and Gynoxys trees and shrubs. It occurs mostly at elevations between 1,900 and 4,100 m (6,200 and 13,500 ft) but west of the Andes is found locally almost at sea level, especially in coastal lomas "fog oases".

== Behavior ==
=== Movement ===
The yellow-billed tit-tyrant is a year-round resident in most of its range. The population in far southern Argentina moves north and east into central Argentina and a few individuals get as far as western Uruguay. Some individuals in the western Andes apparently move to lower elevations in the austral winter.

=== Feeding ===
The yellow-billed tit-tyrant feeds mostly on insects but occasionally also includes grass seeds in its diet. It typically forages singly, in pairs, or small family groups and sometimes joins mixed-species feeding flocks. It forages mostly in shrubs and bushes, mostly taking prey by gleaning while perched but also by briefly hovering and occasionally by a sally to take prey in midair.

=== Breeding ===
The yellow-billed tit-tyrant breeds between October and January in Argentina; its breeding season elsewhere has not been defined. Its nest is a shallow cup made from plant fibers, thistle down, and lichens with a lining of feathers. It is typically built in a shrub within about 1 m (3 ft) of the ground. The clutch is two or three white eggs. The only documented incubation period was 13 days. The time to fledging and details of parental care are not known.

=== Vocalization ===
The yellow-billed tit-tyrant's dawn song is "a rising trill with stuttered burst afterward: brreeee brr-br-br". Its calls are "a rising-falling, musical trill: brrreeeeuu [and] a rising-falling musical chatter: tur-tur-TEE'TEE'tee-tee-tchip".

== Status ==
The IUCN has assessed the yellow-billed tit-tyrant as being of Least Concern. It has a large range; its population size is not known and is believed to be stable. No immediate threats have been identified. It is considered fairly common in the Peruvian Andes and rare to fairly common elsewhere.
