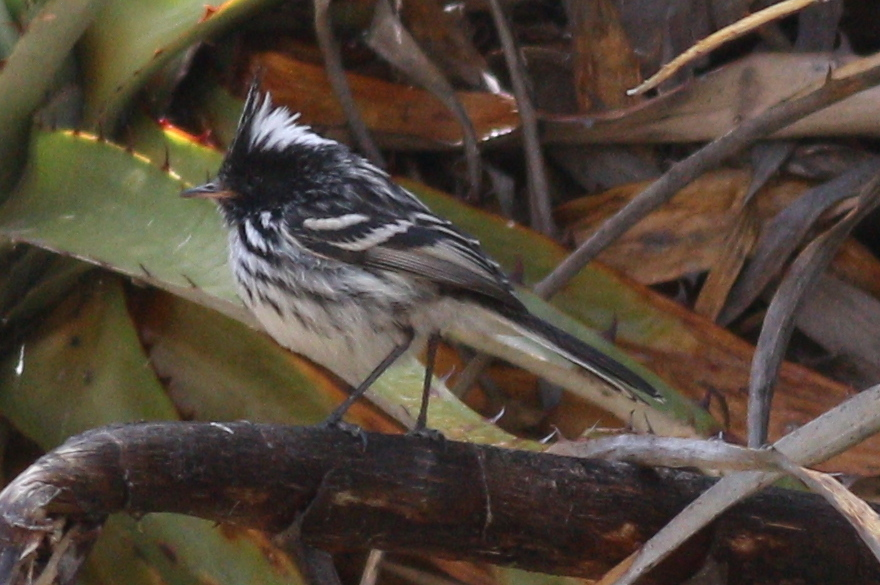

Conservation status
- Least Concern (IUCN 3.1)

Scientific classification
- Kingdom: Animalia
- Phylum: Chordata
- Class: Aves
- Order: Passeriformes
- Family: Tyrannidae
- Genus: Anairetes
- Species: A. nigrocristatus

Binomial name
- Anairetes nigrocristatus Taczanowski, 1884

= Black-crested tit-tyrant =

Species of bird

The black-crested tit-tyrant or Marañón tit-tyrant (Anairetes nigrocristatus) is a species of bird in subfamily Elaeniinae of family Tyrannidae, the tyrant flycatchers. It is found in Ecuador and Peru.

== Taxonomy and systematics ==
The members of genus Anairetes are known commonly as tit-tyrants because their active foraging behavior and crests are reminiscent of the true tits in the family Paridae. The genus had formerly been named Spizitornis.

The black-crested tit-tyrant is monotypic. Some twentieth century authors treated it and the pied-crested tit-tyrant (A. reguloides) as conspecific but by about 1990 this had been discarded. The two are sister species and form a superspecies.

== Description ==
The black-crested tit-tyrant is 13 cm (5.1 in) long. It is the largest and most boldly patterned member of its genus. Adult males have a dramatic black crest formed by elongated feathers of the central crown. The rest of their crown and their nape are white and the rest of their head is black. Their upperparts are black with thin white streaks. Their wings are black with wide white edges on the flight feathers. Their wing coverts have wide white tips that show as two bars on the closed wing. Their tail is black with wide white tips on the feathers; the outermost pair have entirely white outer webs. Their throat, breast, and flanks are streaked with black and white and their belly and undertail coverts are plain yellowish white. They have a dark brown iris, a bright orange bill with a blackish tip, and black legs and feet. Adult females have a shorter crest than males. The front of their head is a duskier black and they are dusky and white instead of black and white elsewhere. Their bill is mostly black with some yellow-orange at the base of the mandible. Juveniles have a shorter crest than adult females, a dusky crown, blackish and pale olivaceous streaks on the back, dirty white underparts with some dark brown streaks on the breast, and a dark bill with a pinkish base to the mandible.

== Distribution and habitat ==
The black-crested tit-tyrant is found from southern Loja Province in extreme southern Ecuador south on the west slope of the Andes in Peru to Ancash Department. In Peru it also occurs in the upper Marañón River valley (hence its alternate English name) and very locally on the eastern Andean slope in Huánuco Department. It inhabits Polylepis woodlands and adjacent montane scrub near treeline and in ravines. In elevation it mostly occurs between 2,100 and 4,000 m (6,900 and 13,100 ft).

== Behavior ==
=== Movement ===
The black-crested tit-tyrant is a year-round resident throughout its range.

=== Feeding ===
The black-crested tit-tyrant feeds on insects. It usually forages in pairs or small groups and sometimes joins mixed-species feeding flocks. It is an active feeder, taking prey mostly by gleaning from leaves and twigs while perched and making short upward flights to hover-glean. It much less often takes prey in mid-air with brief sallies.

=== Breeding ===
The black-crested tit-tyrant's breeding season is believed to include June and July. Nothing else is known about the species' breeding biology.

=== Vocalization ===
The black-crested tit-tyrant's calls are a "squeaky sputtered trreek! trreek! trreek!, a descending, squeaky, chattered tee! titititititer, and a rising-falling trrreeeer".

== Status ==
The IUCN has assessed the black-crested tit-tyrant as being of Least Concern. It has a restricted range; its population size is not known and is believed to be stable. No immediate threats have been identified. It is considered very local in Ecuador and uncommon to locally fairly common in Peru. It occurs in at least two national parks in Peru.
