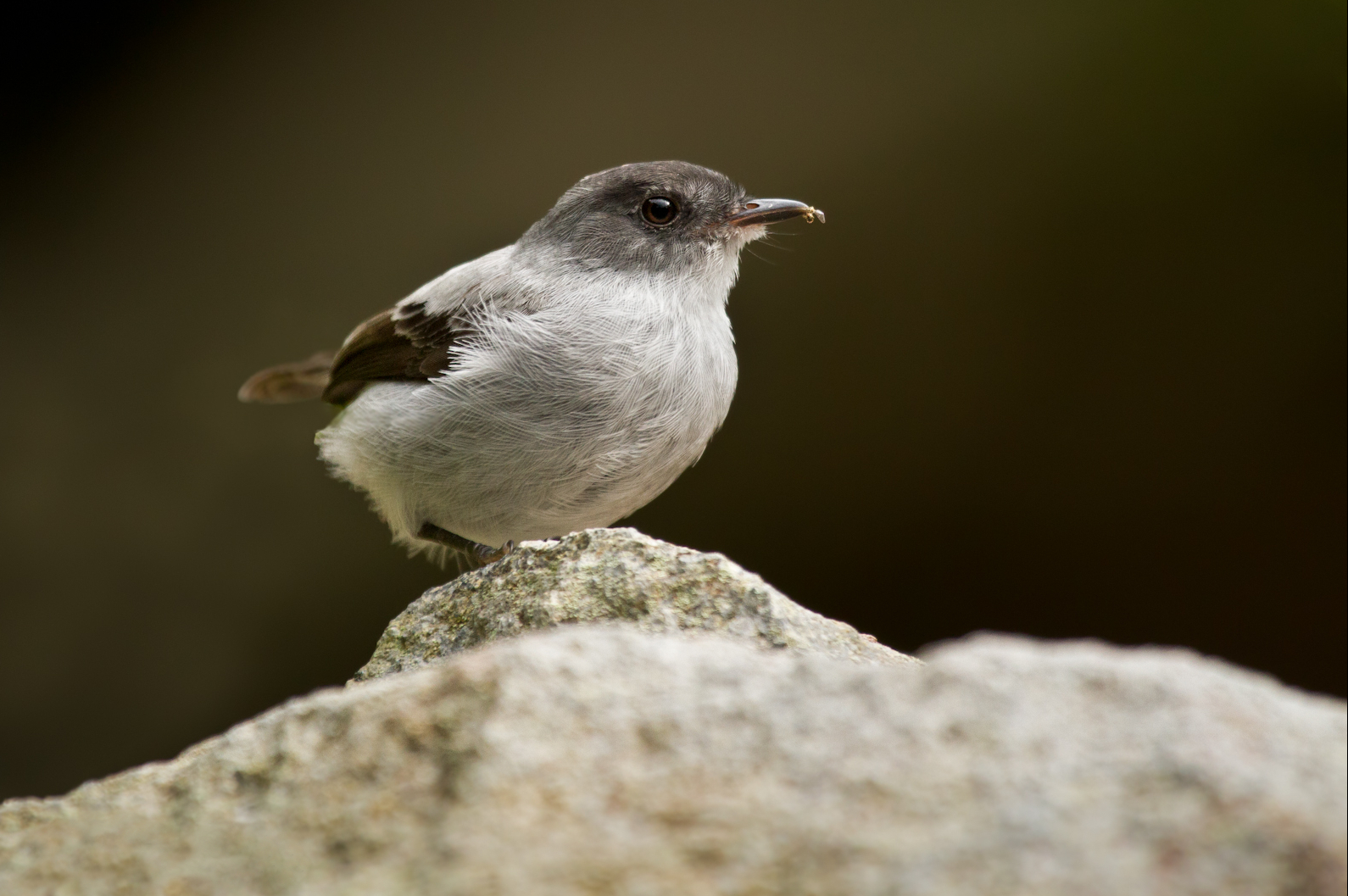

Conservation status
- Least Concern (IUCN 3.1)

Scientific classification
- Kingdom: Animalia
- Phylum: Chordata
- Class: Aves
- Order: Passeriformes
- Family: Tyrannidae
- Genus: Serpophaga
- Species: S. cinerea

Binomial name
- Serpophaga cinerea (Tschudi, 1844)

= Torrent tyrannulet =

Species of bird

The torrent tyrannulet (Serpophaga cinerea) is a small bird in the family Tyrannidae, the tyrant flycatchers. It is found in Bolivia, Colombia, Costa Rica, Ecuador, Panama, Peru, and Venezuela.

== Taxonomy and systematics ==
The torrent tyrannulet has two subspecies, the nominate S. c. cinerea (Tschudi, 1844) and S. c. grisea (Lawrence, 1871).

== Description ==
The torrent tyrannulet is 9.5 to 12 cm (3.7 to 4.7 in) long; eight individuals weighed an average of 8.3 g (0.29 oz). Adults of the nominate subspecies have a mostly black head with a partially hidden white patch in the center of the crown. Their back, rump, and uppertail coverts are gray. Their wings are mostly black with gray or grayish white edges on the coverts. Their tail is black and sometimes has indistinct grayish white tips on the feathers. Their chin and throat are grayish white. The center of their breast and their belly are white and their undertail coverts slightly grayish. Adult females have a slightly duller black crown and nape than males and a smaller white crown patch or none at all. Juveniles have a dusky crown with some dull gray mixed in and brownish gray upperparts that are darker on the uppertail coverts. Subspecies S. c. grisea is smaller and paler than the nominate and has less white in its crown. Both sexes of both subspecies have a dark brown iris, a black bill, and black legs and feet.

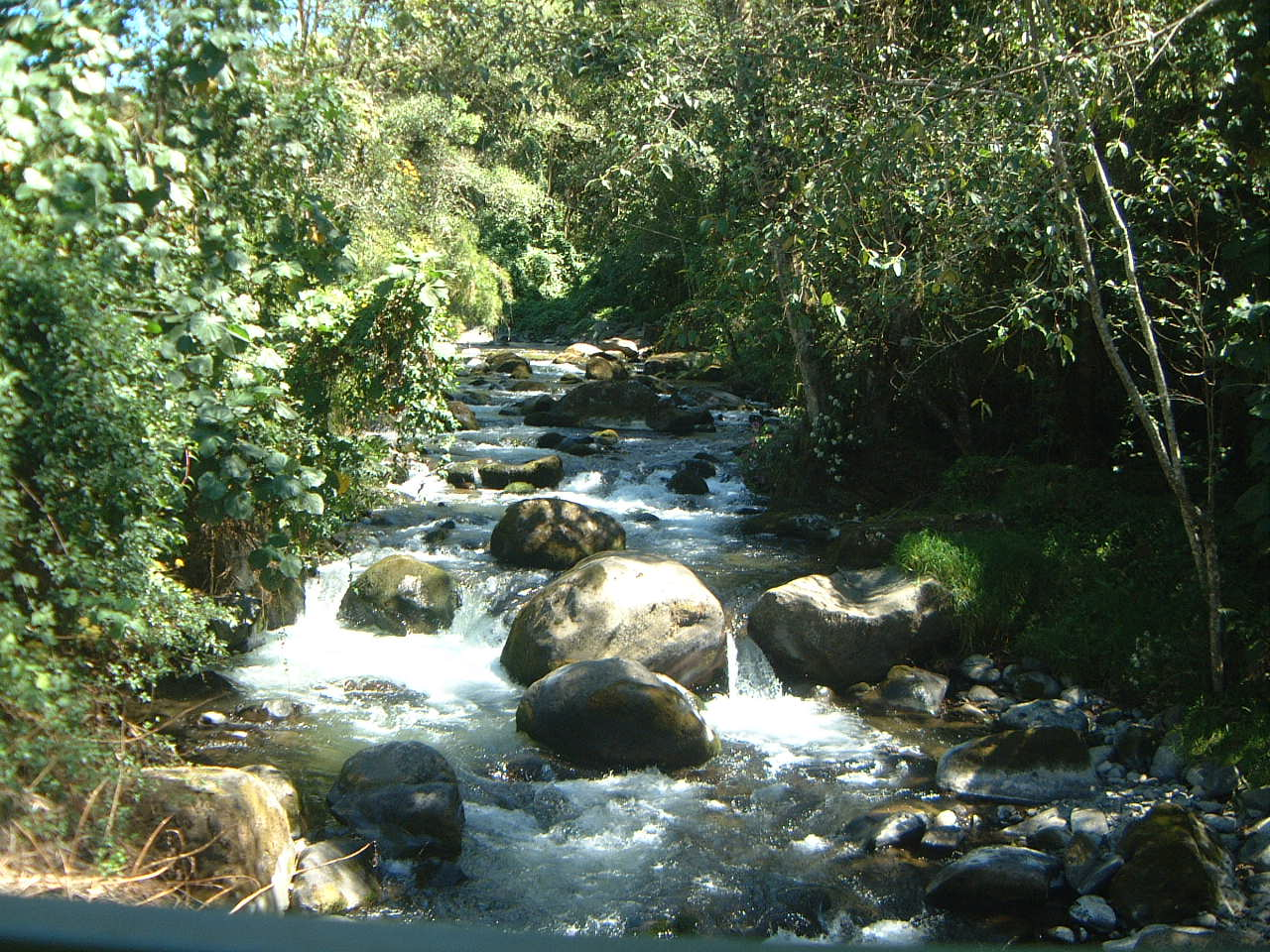
Torrent tyrannulet habitat at 2200 m in Costa Rica

== Distribution and habitat ==
The torrent tyrannulet has a disjunct distribution. Subspecies S. c. grisea is the more northern of the two. It is found from the Cordillera de Tilarán in southern Alajuela Province of Costa Rica south to western Panama's Veraguas Province. The nominate subspecies is found in the Andes of Venezuela's Trujillo, Mérida, and Táchira states, in the Serranía del Perijá that straddles the Colombia-Venezuela border, in northern Colombia's isolated Sierra Nevada de Santa Marta, along all three chains of the Colombian Andes, and south through central Ecuador and central Peru into western Santa Cruz Department in Bolivia. There are also isolated populations in west-central Peru.

The torrent tyrannulet is a bird of rocky fast-flowing mountain streams, primarily in the highlands and less often at lower elevations where the water flows slower. It favors relatively small watercourses in forested terrain though it also occurs on streams in more open landscapes and occasionally in marshes and flooded forest. In elevation it ranges in Costa Rica mostly between 500 and 2,200 m (1,600 and 7,200 ft) and occasionally lower on the Caribbean side. (There is a nesting record from Costa Rica at about 35 m (115 ft), possibly as a result of displacement of birds by hydroelectric work higher up the Sarapiquí River.) It occurs between 1,500 and 2,200 m (4,900 and 7,200 ft) in Venezuela, 500 and 3,200 m (1,600 and 10,500 ft) in Colombia, mostly between 700 and 3,100 m (2,300 and 10,200 ft) in Ecuador, between 800 and 3,100 m (2,600 and 10,200 ft) and locally lower in Peru, and between 400 and 2,500 m (1,300 and 8,200 ft) in Bolivia.

== Behavior ==
=== Movement ===
The torrent tyrannulet is a year-round resident throughout its range.

=== Feeding ===
The torrent tyrannulet feeds on arthropods, primarily flying insects. It forages actively, singly or in pairs, and primarily by hawking during a short flight from boulders in the stream. Between flights it characteristically wags and flicks its tail. It also takes prey from streamside vegetation while perched in it or briefly hovering, and has been observed feeding on the ground in grassy areas and on gravel paths.

=== Breeding ===
The torrent tyrannulet has breeding records between January and June in Costa Rica and Panama, between March and September in Colombia, and between June and October in Peru. Most of the known nests have been found in Costa Rica. They were cups made of plant material with moss on the outside and a lining of down feathers. They were attached to vegetation, usually overhanging the stream, between about 0.4 and 4 m (1 and 13 ft) above the water. The clutch size is two buffy white eggs and only the female incubates. The incubation period is about 17 to 18 days and fledging occurs about 17 days after hatch. Both parents brood and provision nestlings.

=== Vocalization ===
The torrent tyrannulet's dawn song in Costa Rica is a slow series of chip notes separated by as much as 10 seconds. Pairs also vocalize "in unison a short refrain made up of a sharp chip, rapidly repeated". Its song in the Andes has been described as "a high, thin seek! ti'ti'ti'ti'ti'ti, last part trilled, sometimes hesitant or irreg[ular]" and its call as a "loud, sharp, freq[uently] repeated seek note audible over stream noise". Other descriptions of the song and call are respectively "a rapid series of twittering chips" and ""a high, thin ti-tsip".

== Status ==
The IUCN has assessed the torrent tyrannulet as being of Least Concern. It has a very large range; its estimated population of at least 500,000 mature individuals is believed to be decreasing. No immediate threats have been identified. It is considered common in Costa Rica, Venezuela, and Colombia and fairly common in Peru. It occurs in many protected areas, but "[s]iltation in streams and rivers may negatively affect [the] Torrent Tyrannulet". As noted above, its occurrence at very low elevation in Costa Rica is postulated to be due to hydropower dam construction upstream.
