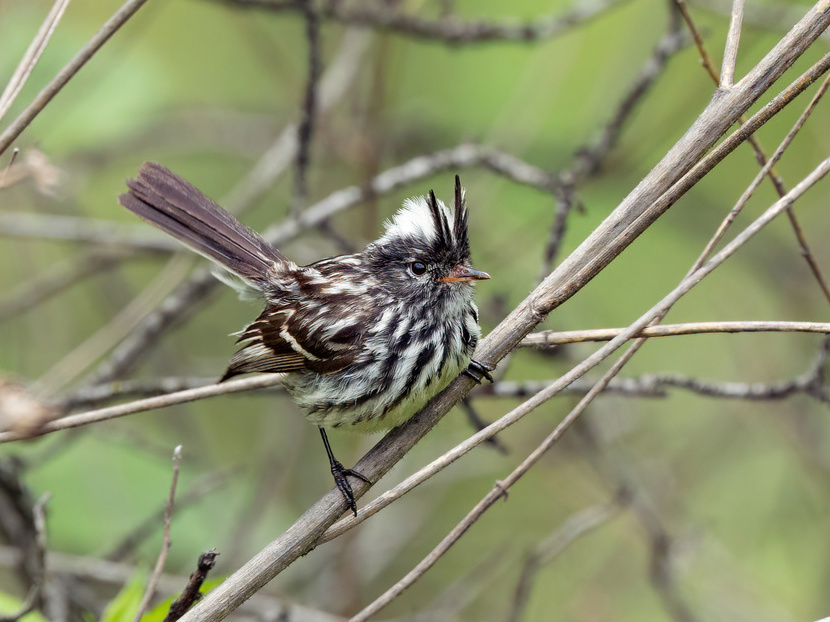
- Illustration by Alcide d'Orbigny in 1847

Conservation status
- Least Concern (IUCN 3.1)

Scientific classification
- Kingdom: Animalia
- Phylum: Chordata
- Class: Aves
- Order: Passeriformes
- Family: Tyrannidae
- Genus: Anairetes
- Species: A. reguloides

Binomial name
- Anairetes reguloides (D'Orbigny & Lafresnaye, 1837)

= Pied-crested tit-tyrant =

Species of bird

The pied-crested tit-tyrant (Anairetes reguloides) is a species of bird in subfamily Elaeniinae of family Tyrannidae, the tyrant flycatchers. It is found in Chile and Peru.

== Taxonomy and systematics ==
The members of genus Anairetes are known commonly as tit-tyrants because their active foraging behavior and crests are reminiscent of the true tits in the family Paridae. The genus had formerly been named Spizitornis.

The pied-crested tit-tyrant has two subspecies, the nominate A. r. reguloides (D'Orbigny & Lafresnaye, 1837) and A. r. albiventris (Chapman, 1924). Some twentieth century authors treated it and the black-crested tit-tyrant (A. nigrocristatus) as conspecific but by about 1990 this had been discarded. The two are sister species and form a superspecies.

== Description ==
The pied-crested tit-tyrant is 11 to 12 cm (4.3 to 4.7 in) long; five females weighed an average of 6.7 g (0.24 oz). Adult males of the nominate subspecies have a dramatic split black crest formed by elongated feathers on the sides of the crown. The rest of their crown and their nape are white and the rest of their head is black. Their upperparts are black with thin white streaks. Their wings are black with white ends on the flight feathers. Their wing coverts have wide white tips that show as two bars on the closed wing. Their tail is black with thin white tips on the feathers; the outermost pair have entirely white outer webs. Their breast and flanks are streaked with black and white and their belly and undertail coverts are whitish with a faint yellow tinge. Adult females have a shorter crest than males. They have a white crescent under their eye. They have thin white streaks on their black throat and are buffy dark gray and white instead of black and white elsewhere. Juveniles have a shorter crest than adult females, dark buffy brown upperparts, and pale buffy underparts. Males of subspecies A. r. albiventris have a longer crest than the nominate, a pure white belly, and larger white areas on their crown, nape, and outer tail feathers. Both sexes of both subspecies have a dark brown iris, a yellow to bright red-orange bill with a dark tip, and black legs and feet.

== Distribution and habitat ==
Subspecies A. r. albiventris of the pied-crested tit-tyrant is the more northerly of the two. It is found in Peru from Ancash Department south to Ica and western Ayacucho departments. The nominate subspecies is found from southern Ayacucho south into extreme northwestern Chile's Arica Province. There are single specimens from Peru's Cuzco and Apurímac departments. The species inhabits the generally arid coastal region, where it is found in scrublands, thickets along watercourses, in "fog oasis" lomas, and in hedgerows in agricultural plots. It also occurs in Polylepis woodlands above treeline. In elevation it ranges from sea level to 4,000 m (13,000 ft) but is found below about 2,800 m (9,200 ft) in the north where its range overlaps that of the black-crested tit-tyrant.

== Behavior ==
=== Movement ===
The pied-crested tit-tyrant is a year-round resident throughout its range.

=== Feeding ===
The pied-crested tit-tyrant's diet had not been detailed but is known to be mostly arthropods. It usually forages singly or in pairs and sometimes joins mixed-species feeding flocks. It is an active feeder, taking prey mostly by gleaning from leaves and twigs while perched and making short upward flights to hover-glean. It much less often takes prey in mid-air with brief sallies.

=== Breeding ===
The pied-crested tit-tyrant's breeding season appears to span from November to March. Nothing else is known about its breeding biology.

=== Vocalization ===
The pied-crested tit-tyrant's dawn song is "a squeaky series of notes and rising churrs: teek'teek'trk-trrrk or tk-tweek! trrrrk". Its call is "a descending series of squeaky, mewed notes, sometimes with a dry rattle: tweek-tweek-twik-tuik-trr".

== Status ==
The IUCN has assessed the pied-crested tit-tyrant as being of Least Concern. It has a large range; its population size is not known and is believed to be stable. No immediate threats have been identified. It is considered uncommon to fairly common in Peru. "Little is known about the anthropogenic effects on the Pied-crested Tit-Tyrant, though habitats nearly throughout its distribution are heavily affected human land use." It does occur in at least one protected area and is known from riparian corridors within the city of Lima.
