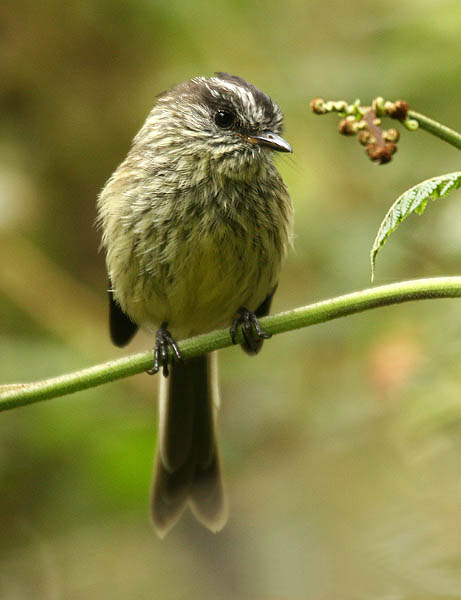
- Agile tit-tyrant (Uromyias agilis)

Scientific classification
- Kingdom: Animalia
- Phylum: Chordata
- Class: Aves
- Order: Passeriformes
- Family: Tyrannidae
- Genus: Uromyias; Hellmayr, 1927

Type species
- Euscarthmus agilis Sclater, 1856

Species
- 2, see text

= Uromyias =

Genus of birds

Uromyias is a genus of small Andean, tyrant flycatchers known as tit-tyrants. They were formerly recognized based on syrinxial and plumage characters, including a flatter crest and a longer tail, but was included within Anairetes due to genetic analysis. Recent analyses suggested splitting into Uromyias again.

The tit-tyrants are fairly small birds (11–14 cm) that get their common name from the tit family, due to their energetic tit-like dispositions and appearance, primarily in their crests. Tit-tyrants live in temperate or arid scrub habitats and are mainly found in the Andes mountains. It is one of only a few genera of small flycatchers that occur at such high altitudes.

== Species ==
The genus contains two species:

Genus Uromyias – Hellmayr, 1927 – two species
Common name	Scientific name and subspecies	Range	Size and ecology	IUCN status and estimated population
Agile tit-tyrant	Uromyias agilis (Sclater, PL, 1856)	Bolivia, Colombia, Ecuador, and Venezuela	Size: Habitat: Diet:	LC
Unstreaked tit-tyrant	Uromyias agraphia (Chapman, 1919)	Peru	Size: Habitat: Diet:	LC
