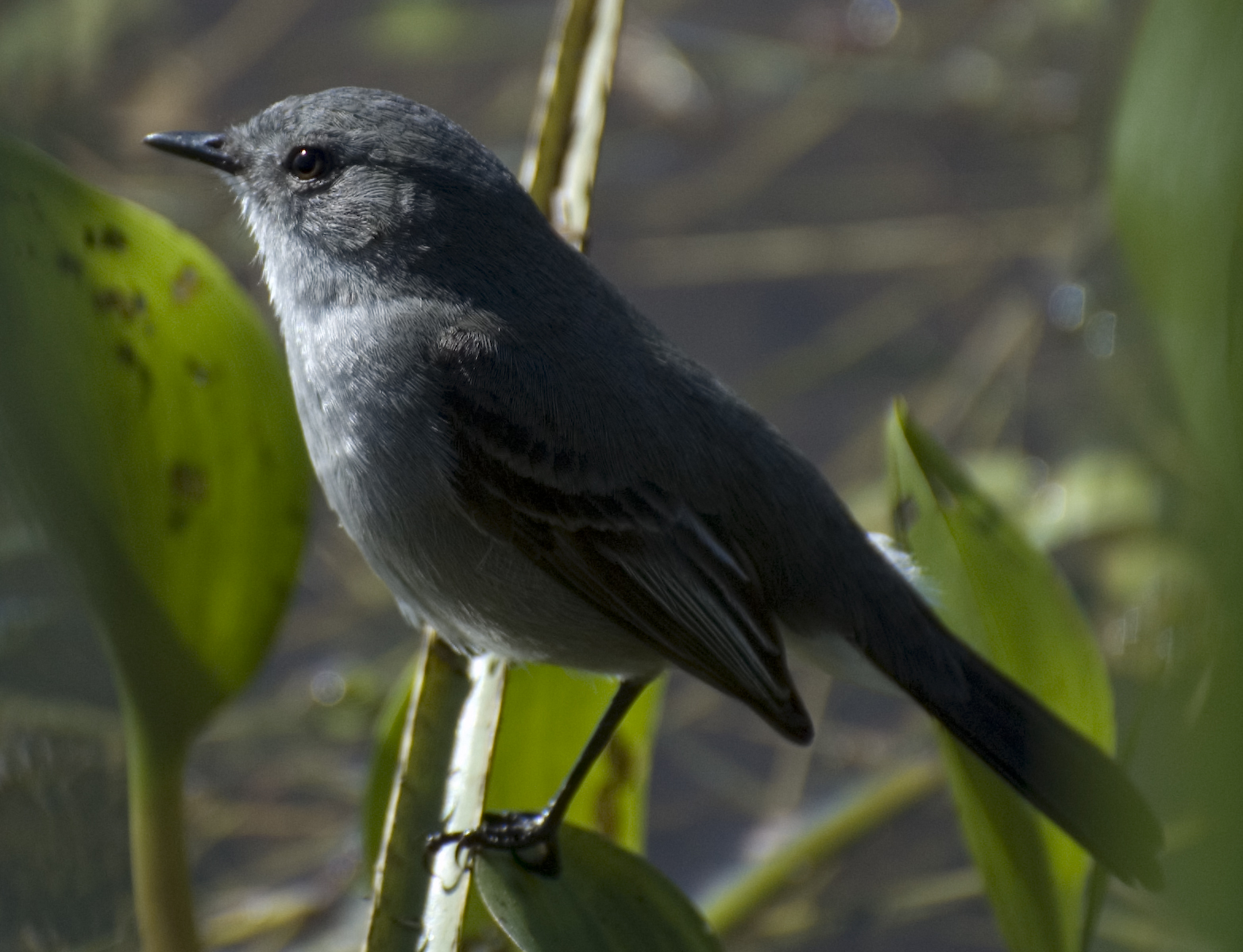
- Sooty tyrannulet (Serpophaga nigricans)

Scientific classification
- Kingdom: Animalia
- Phylum: Chordata
- Class: Aves
- Order: Passeriformes
- Family: Tyrannidae
- Genus: Serpophaga; Gould, 1839

Type species
- Serpophaga subcristata Gould, 1839

= Serpophaga =

Genus of birds

Serpophaga is a genus of birds in the tyrant flycatcher family Tyrannidae that are found in Central and South America.

The genus contains five species:

Image	Scientific name	Common name	Distribution
	Serpophaga cinerea	Torrent tyrannulet	Costa Rica south to northern Bolivia and northwestern Venezuela.
	Serpophaga hypoleuca	River tyrannulet	Orinoco and Amazon Basin
	Serpophaga nigricans	Sooty tyrannulet	Argentina, Brazil, and Uruguay; also southern Paraguay.
	Serpophaga subcristata	White-crested tyrannulet	Argentina, Bolivia, Brazil, Paraguay, and Uruguay
	Serpophaga griseicapilla	Straneck's tyrannulet	Argentina
