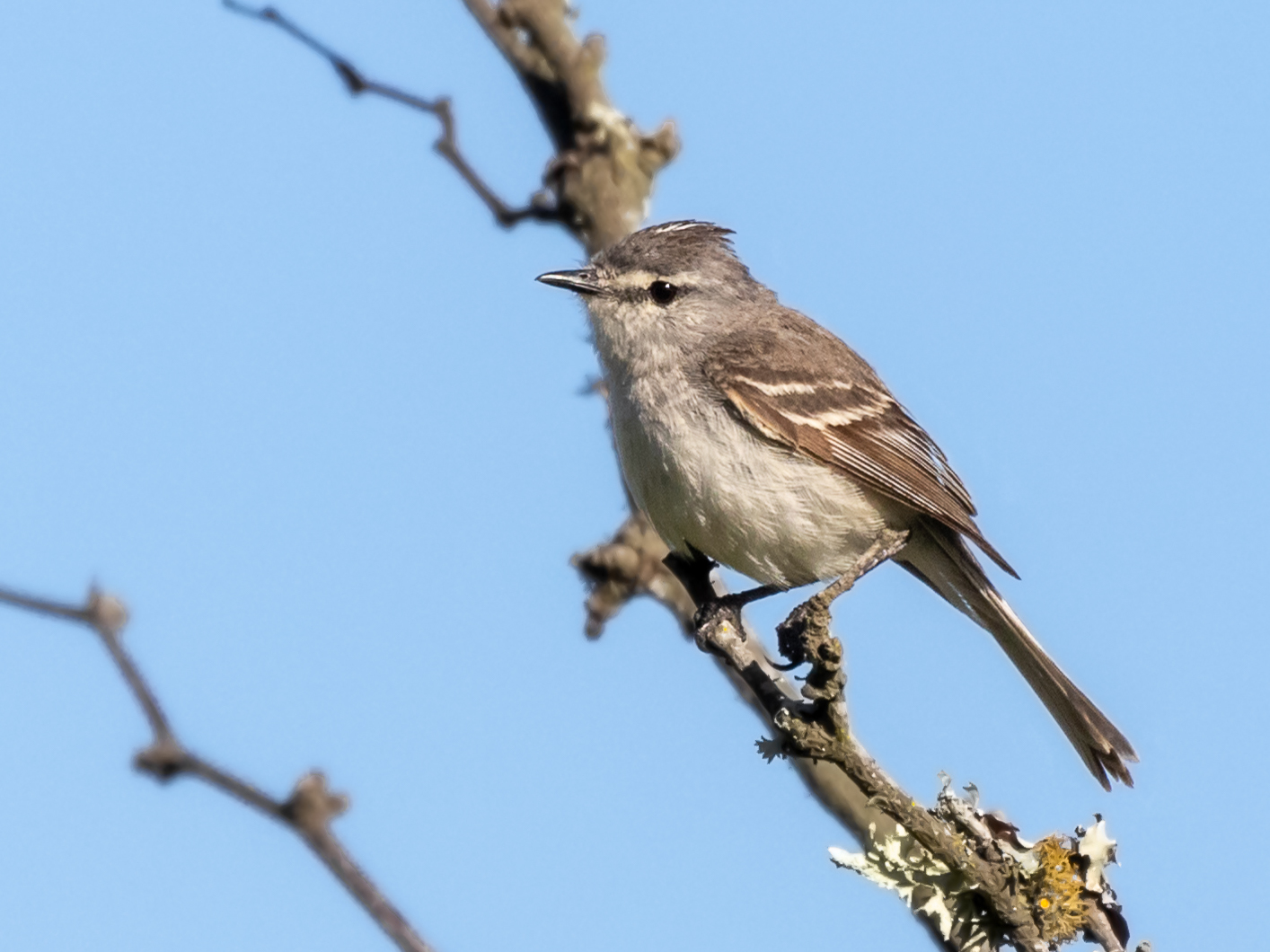

Conservation status
- Least Concern (IUCN 3.1)

Scientific classification
- Kingdom: Animalia
- Phylum: Chordata
- Class: Aves
- Order: Passeriformes
- Family: Tyrannidae
- Genus: Serpophaga
- Species: S. griseicapilla

Binomial name
- Serpophaga griseicapilla Straneck, 2007

= Straneck's tyrannulet =

Species of bird

Straneck's tyrannulet (Serpophaga griseicapilla), also known as the monte tyrannulet and grey-crowned tyrannulet, is a small species of bird in the family Tyrannidae, the tyrant flycatchers. It is found in Argentina, Bolivia, Brazil, Paraguay, and Uruguay.

== Taxonomy and systematics ==
Straneck's tyrannulet has a confusing taxonomic history. It had been known since the 1990s by the binomial Serpophaga griseiceps, which had previously been assigned to specimens that were later recognized as immatures of what was then the white-bellied tyrannulet (Serpophaga munda) and so was invalid. Roberto Straneck formally described the species and assigned its current binomial in 2007. It was later given its English name in his honor.

Straneck's tyrannulet is monotypic.

== Description ==
Straneck's tyrannulet is 9 to 11 cm (3.5 to 4.3 in) long and weighs 4.4 to 7.5 g (0.16 to 0.26 oz). The sexes have the same plumage. Adults have a gray crown and nape with a hidden bit of white on some black central crown feathers. They have a thin white supercilium, a white crescent under the eye, and a dark gray line through the eye on an otherwise grayish white face. Their upperparts are olivaceous brown. Their wings are dusky brownish gray with lighter edges to most of the flight feathers and two cinnamon to whitish wing bars. Their tail is dark gray-brown with whitish edges on the outer feathers. Their chin and throat are white with a grayish wash. Their breast is grayish that progresses to pale yellow on the belly. Both sexes have a hazel-brown to dark brown iris, a black bill, and black legs and feet.

== Distribution and habitat ==
Taxonomic systems differ on the range of Straneck's tyrannulet. According to the South American Classification Committee of the American Ornithological Society, it breeds in Argentina and Bolivia and is a non-breeding visitor to Brazil, Paraguay, and Uruguay. BirdLife International's (BLI) map, used by the IUCN, shows it as breeding only in Argentina and as a non-breeder in northern Argentina, southern Bolivia, far southern Brazil, Paraguay, and Uruguay. The International Ornithological Committee generally agrees with BLI but questions Brazil. The Clements taxonomy does not include Bolivia in its range statement; it lists but does not specify breeding or non-breeding in the other four countries. The Cornell Lab of Ornithology's Birds of the World describes it as breeding in northwestern Argentina and possibly southern Bolivia and as a non-breeder in eastern Bolivia, southern Brazil, Paraguay, and Uruguay.

During the breeding season Straneck's tyrannulet inhabits the Monte Desert in Argentina. One apparent breeding-season record in Bolivia was in the Gran Chaco, a dry forest biome. In its non-breeding range it inhabits the Chaco, the Argentine Espinal, Pampas grasslands, and lowland moist forest. In elevation it occurs between about 30 and 2,280 m (100 and 7,500 ft).

== Behavior ==
=== Movement ===
As noted above, authorities differ on exactly where Straneck's tyrannulet breeds and does not. At the least it breeds in Argentina and moves almost entirely north and east from the breeding area.

=== Feeding ===
Straneck's tyrannulet feeds on arthropods. It moves through vegetation with short jumps and flutters, feeding from very near the ground up to at least 6 m (20 ft) above it.

=== Breeding ===
The only known nest of Straneck's tyrannulet was found "ready for eggs" in early November in Argentina. It was 1.2 m (4 ft) above the ground in an area dominated by Prosopidastrum angusticarpum shrubs. Nothing else is known about the species' breeding biology.

=== Vocalization ===
The main vocalization of Straneck's tyrannulet is "a high-pitched but not far-carrying 'twie tirrrrrrrrrrrrrrrrrr', occasionally with the first or second portions emitted alone". Its alarm call is "a more powerful, high-pitched 'tie...tie...tie...tie...' " of three to five notes.

== Status ==
The IUCN has assessed Straneck's tyrannulet as being of Least Concern. It has a large range; its population size is not known and is believed to be stable. No immediate threats have been identified. It is "[r]eported to be common, but precise details of distribution need to be established, both for breeding and non-breeding seasons".
