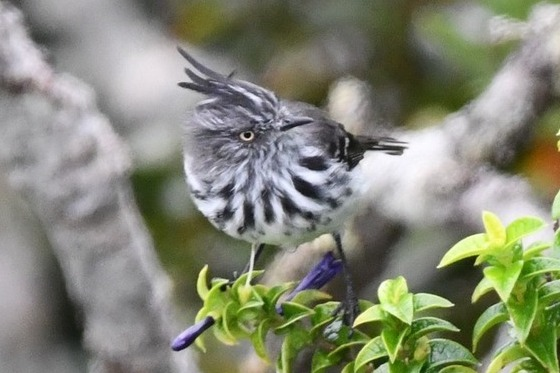

Conservation status
- Endangered (IUCN 3.1)

Scientific classification
- Kingdom: Animalia
- Phylum: Chordata
- Class: Aves
- Order: Passeriformes
- Family: Tyrannidae
- Genus: Anairetes
- Species: A. fernandezianus

Binomial name
- Anairetes fernandezianus (Philippi, 1857)

= Juan Fernandez tit-tyrant =

Species of bird

The Juan Fernandez tit-tyrant (Anairetes fernandezianus) is an endangered species of bird in the family Tyrannidae, the tyrant flycatchers. It is endemic to the Juan Fernández Islands in the South Pacific Ocean off of Chile.

== Taxonomy ==
The members of genus Anairetes are known commonly as tit-tyrants because of their active foraging behavior and crests are reminiscent of the true tits in the family Paridae. The genus had formerly been named Spizitornis. The Juan Fernandez tit-tyrant is monotypic.

== Description ==
The Juan Fernandez tit-tyrant is 12.5 cm (4.9 in) long. The sexes have the same plumage, though females are slightly smaller than males and have a smaller crest. Adults have a black crest formed by elongated feathers in the center of the crown; the rest of their crown is blackish with a few whitish feathers. Their forehead and lores are black and extend through the eye, their supercilium is thin and white, and the rest of their face is white with black streaks. Their upperparts are dark dusky gray. Their wings are blackish with white to pale yellow edges on the flight feathers. Their wing coverts have thin white tips that show as two bars on the closed wing. Their tail is dusky with whitish outer webs on the outermost pair of feathers and whitish tips on the others. Their throat, breast, flanks, and upper belly are white with bold black streaks and their lower belly and undertail coverts are unmarked creamy white. Both sexes have a pale yellow iris, a black bill, and black legs and feet.

== Distribution and habitat ==
The Juan Fernandez tit-tyrant is found only on Robinson Crusoe Island in the Juan Fernández Islands about 670 km (362 nmi; 416 mi) off the central Chilean coast. It inhabits a variety of wooded and scrubby landscapes as well as secondary growth and gardens. In elevation it ranges from sea level to 900 m (3,000 ft).

== Behavior ==
The Juan Fernandez tit-tyrant is a year-round resident. Its diet has not been detailed but is believed to be mostly insects. It forages in pairs or family groups, taking prey by gleaning while perched but also by briefly hovering and occasionally by a sally to take prey in midair. The Juan Fernandez tit-tyrant apparently breeds between August and December. Nothing else is known about its breeding biology.

Though there are some recordings of the Juan Fernandez tit-tyrant's vocalizations, they have not been put into words.

The IUCN originally in 2004 assessed the Juan Fernandez tit-tyrant as Near Threatened; in 2023 it was reassessed as Endangered. It occurs on a single 136 km^{2} (53 sq mi) island. Its population is estimated to be 520 mature individuals and is believed to be decreasing. "The species is threatened by the degradation and replacement of native vegetation through non-native plants and grazing by introduced goats and cattle. Further threats include predation by introduced Red-backed Hawk (Geranoaetus polyosoma) from Isla Alejandro Selkirk, rats (Rattus spp.) and cats (Felis cattus)." Forest conversion has slowed since about 2000 and "efforts to restore native vegetation and eradicate invasive species are ongoing".
