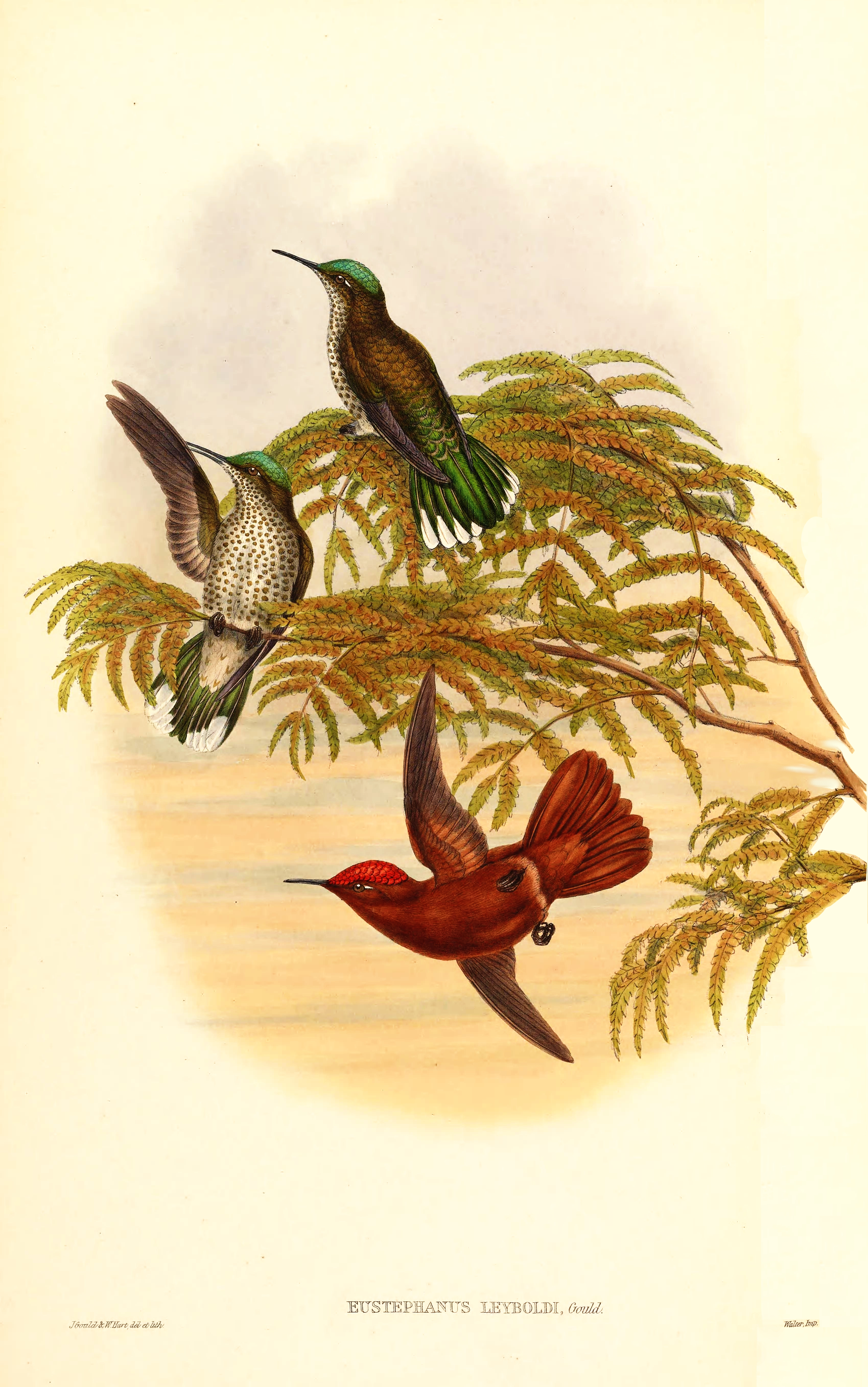

Conservation status
- Extinct (1908) (IUCN 3.1)

Scientific classification
- Kingdom: Animalia
- Phylum: Chordata
- Class: Aves
- Order: Apodiformes
- Family: Trochilidae
- Genus: Sephanoides
- Species: S. fernandensis
- Subspecies: †S. f. leyboldi

Trinomial name
- †Sephanoides fernandensis leyboldi Gould, 1880

Synonyms
- Eustephanus leyboldi Gould, 1880-1887

= Alejandro Selkirk firecrown =

Extinct subspecies of hummingbird

The Alejandro Selkirk firecrown (Sephanoides fernandensis leyboldi) is an extinct subspecies of the Juan Fernández firecrown that lived on Alejandro Selkirk Island in the Juan Fernández Archipelago belonging to Chile.

== Taxonomy ==
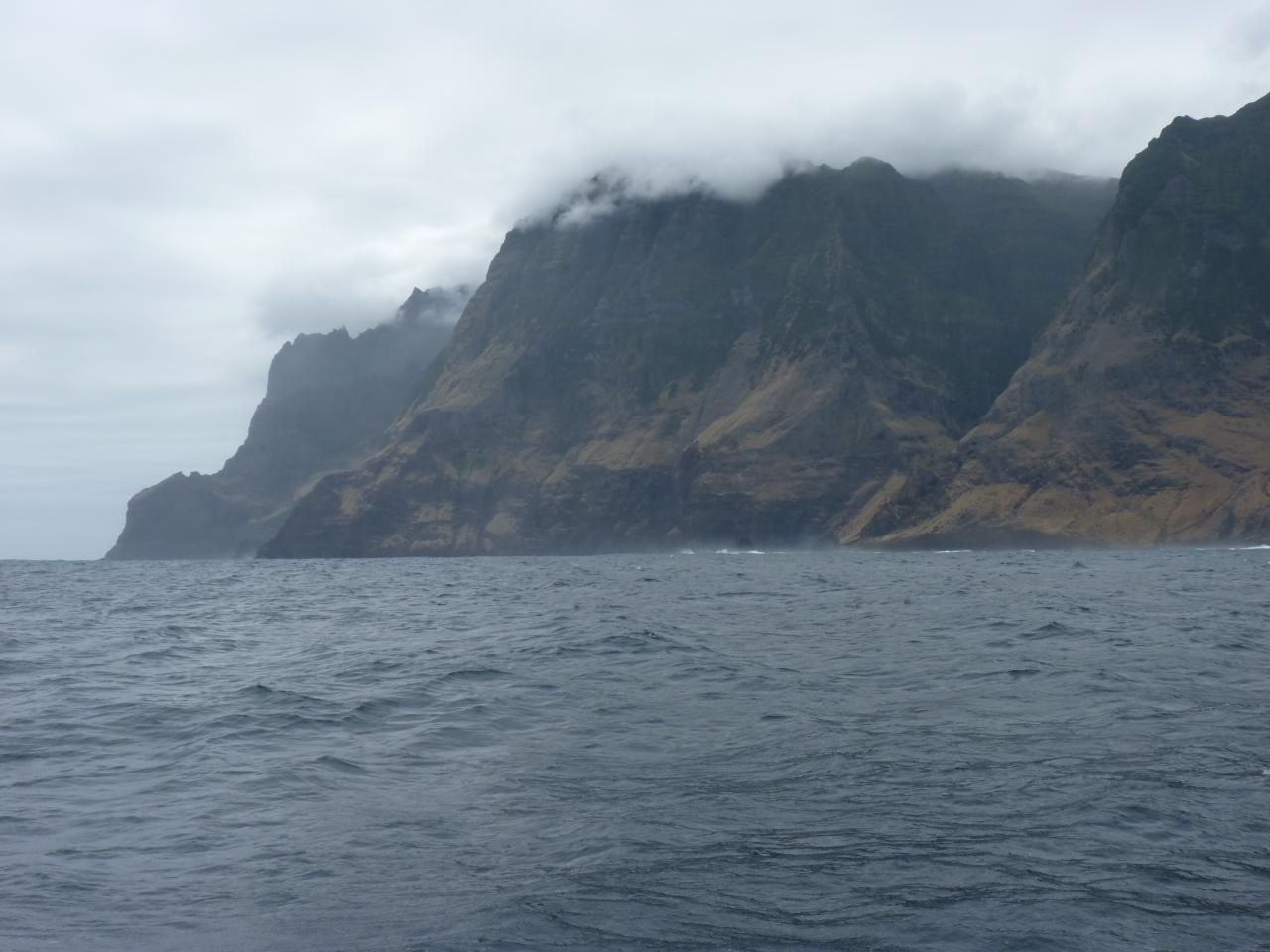
A view of Alejandro Selkirk Island

Most worldwide taxonomic systems accept this species as putative. However, a few authors question this subspecies and whether a firecrown ever existed on Alejandro Selkirk Island.

== Extinction ==
The Alejandro Selkirk firecrown may have gone extinct due to deforestation, erosion and predation by introduced cats, rats, goats, and rabbits. It might have also competed with the introduction of plants such as Luma apiculata, as well as the green-backed firecrown. It was last seen in 1908, but the sighting was unconfirmed.
