= Cerro de Los Inocentes =

Mountain in Chile

- Location within Chile

Highest point
- Elevation: 1,268 m (4,160 ft)
- Isolation: 819.66 km (509.31 mi)
- Coordinates: 33°45′51″S 80°48′30″W

Naming
- Etymology: Holy Innocents

Geography
- Location: Alejandro Selkirk Island, Chile

Climbing
- First ascent: unknown

Cerro de Los Inocentes (meaning "Hill of the Innocents" in Spanish) is the highest mountain in the Juan Fernández Islands, Valparaíso Region, Chile. Located on the remnant of a basaltic volcano from the Pleistocene in Alejandro Selkirk Island, the area was discovered by Europeans in 1574. The Stejneger's petrel uses the mountain as a burrowing ground.

== Geography ==
Cerro de Los Inocentes is 1,000 m (3,300 ft) above sea level and is located on Alejandro Selkirk Island, the western-most island of the Juan Fernández Islands in the Pacific Ocean. The summit of the mountain is 1,319 m (4,327 ft) high. It is the tallest mountain in the Juan Fernández Islands and is located on the southern portion of Alejandro Selkirk Island.

The island is located on the remnant of a basaltic volcano from the Pleistocene.

== History ==
There is currently no known evidence of Polynesians or indigenous peoples inhabiting the island prior to the arrival of Europeans. Europeans first arrived at Alexander Selkirk Island in 1574. In 1935, the entire island was declared a national park.

== Environment ==
The area has a warm temperate climate with a dry summer and wet winter. There are 75 flowering plant and 45 pteridophyte species native to Alexander Selkirk Island. Dicksonia externa and Histiopteris incisa are present on the mountain. Aristotelia chilensis was introduced to the area in the 1930s. The valleys of the island were covered in a forest prior to the arrival of Europeans, but the slops of Cerro de Los Inocentes were not. Stejneger's petrel burrow on the ridges of the mountain.

== See also ==
- List of islands by highest point
- List of mountains in Chile

== Works cited ==
=== Books ===
- Beals, Carleton (1949). The Long Island Chile. Coward-McCann.
- Howse, Derek; Thrower, Norman, eds. (1992). A Buccaneer’s Atlas. University of California Press. ISBN 9780520426672.

=== Journals ===
- Haberle, Simon (2003). "Late Quaternary Vegetation Dynamics and Human Impact on Alexander Selkirk Island, Chile". Journal of Biogeography. 30 (2). Wiley: 239–255. doi:10.2307/3554517. JSTOR 3554517.
