= International Hummingbird Society =

US-based non-profit organization

The International Hummingbird Society is a non-profit organization whose mission is to promote the understanding and conservation of hummingbirds. It was founded in 1996 by Dr. H. Ross Hawkins, who was its executive director until he died in early July 2020. His work and the Society continue and hummingbird lovers around the world acknowledge his enormous contribution. The Society's offices are currently at 2756 West State Route 89a, Sedona, Arizona, US. Members can be found in all U.S. states and over twenty other countries.

Currently the society has partnership Memoranda of Understanding (MOU) with Oikonos and Bioconservancy (formerly the Hummingbird Conservancy of Colombia) for its efforts to protect the Juan Fernández firecrown (JFF) Sephanoides fernandensis in Chile and the colorful puffleg Eriocnemis mirabilis in Colombia, respectively.

The society is funded primarily by memberships (individual, business, and corporate) and donations. In 2006, however, a new avenue of funding was opened through one of its corporate sponsors, a winery in California, US. Beginning that year, they introduced a new red wine, dedicating that year's vintage to a critically endangered hummingbird species. This raised nearly $20,000 for the JFF, the first species chosen. In 2007 they introduced the second wine, dedicated to the Honduran Emerald, and the third year to the Colorful Puffleg.

In 2012 the society held its first Sedona Hummingbird Festival in Sedona, Arizona. This event consisted of three days of presentations by hummingbird experts, hummingbird banding demonstrations, hummingbird garden tours, a gala banquet, and a hummingbird marketplace.

== See also ==
- Biodiversity
- Ecology
