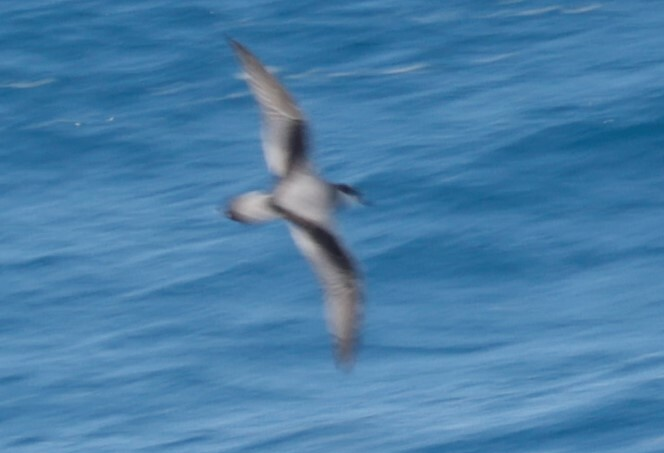

Conservation status
- Vulnerable (IUCN 3.1)

Scientific classification
- Kingdom: Animalia
- Phylum: Chordata
- Class: Aves
- Order: Procellariiformes
- Family: Procellariidae
- Genus: Pterodroma
- Species: P. longirostris

Binomial name
- Pterodroma longirostris (Stejneger, 1893)

Synonyms
- Aestrelata longirostris Stejneger, 1893; Pterodroma leucoptera longirostris Stejneger, 1893; Pterodroma cookii masafuerae Lönnberg, 1921; Pterodroma longirostris masafuerae Lönnberg, 1921; Pterodroma cookii masafuerae Lönnberg, 1921

= Stejneger's petrel =

Species of bird

Stejneger's petrel (Pterodroma longirostris) is a species of seabird belonging to the family Procellaridae, the gadfly petrels, shearwaters and related species. This species is found in the tropical and subtropical Pacific Ocean, although as a breeding bird it is restricted to the Juan Fernandez Islands of Chile.

== Taxonomy ==
Stejneger's petrel was first formally described as Aestrelata longirostris in 1893 by the Norwegian born American zoologist Leonhard Stejneger, with its type locality given as the Province of Mutzu, Hondo, Japan. Stejneger's petrel is now classified in the gadfly petrel genus Pterodroma within the petrel and shearwater family Procellariidae within the tubenose order Procellariiformes.

== Etymology ==
Stejneger's petrel is a member of the genus Pterodroma, a name which is derived from the from Ancient Greek pteron, "wing" and dromos, "runner". The specific name, longirostris, means "long-billed"; Stejneger noted that this bird was longer billed than related species. Its English common name honours its describer Leonhard Hess Stejneger.

== Description ==
Stejneger's petrel is a medium-sized, rather elegant seabird. it has greyish upperparts and white underparts. There is a dark "M" pattern across the upper wings and body. It has an extensive white forehead contrasting with the dark grey crown, which contrasts with the lighter grey back. There is frequently a white notch at the posterior end of this cap. The underwing is white with small black marks at the metacarpals, and the tail has an extensive black tip.

== Distribution and habitat ==
Stejneger's petrel is highly pelagic, rarely approaching land, except to nest and rear young. It occurs in the Pacific Ocean, nesting in the Cerro de Los Inocentes mountain of the Juan Fernández Islands off Chile. Outside the breeding season, Stejneger's petrel migrates to the waters of the north-west Pacific off Japan. The migratory route appears to be along a corridor which runs to the south-east of Hawaii between April and June; some birds are recorded as far south as North Island, New Zealand. It is thought that the return migration is a clockwise route in the northern Pacific in late summer and autumn, and this species has been recorded off California, United States.

== Biology ==
Stejneger's petrel nests in burrows located on slopes within tree fern forest, dominated by Dicksonia externa, and adjoining grasslands at heights between 700 and 1,120 m (2,300 and 3,670 ft).

The breeding season starts in November, and a single egg is laid in late November-early December. This hatches in late January to mid-February, and the chick fledges in May. Stejneger's petrel and Juan Fernandez petrel (P. externa) form mixed-species colonies, with Stejneger's petrel normally forming small, single-species groups of burrows in shallow soils within the colonies of the larger-bodied Juan Fernandez petrels.

This species forages in pelagic waters, and its diet is mostly made up of squid and small fish.

== Conservation status ==
Stejneger's petrel is classified as Vulnerable by the International Union for Conservation of Nature. The population is thought to have declined, with the main threat being predation by introduced predators. Feral domestic cats, brown rats and house mice feed on the eggs and chicks, and affect the smaller Stejneger's petrels more than they do the larger Juan Fernandez petrels. They are also likely to be threatened by climate change.
