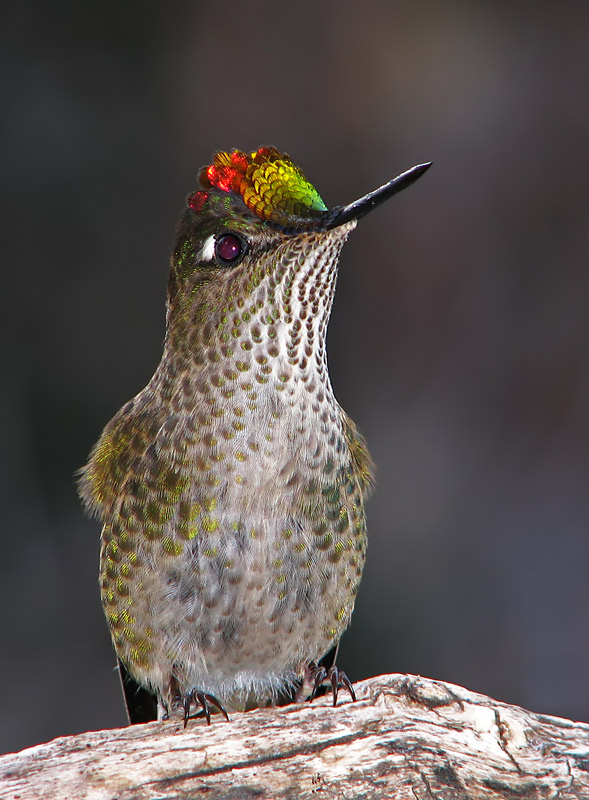

Conservation status
- Least Concern (IUCN 3.1)
- CITES Appendix II

Scientific classification
- Kingdom: Animalia
- Phylum: Chordata
- Class: Aves
- Order: Apodiformes
- Family: Trochilidae
- Genus: Sephanoides
- Species: S. sephaniodes

Binomial name
- Sephanoides sephaniodes (Lesson & Garnot, 1827)

= Green-backed firecrown =

Species of hummingbird

The green-backed firecrown (Sephanoides sephaniodes) is a hummingbird in the "coquettes", tribe Lesbiini of subfamily Lesbiinae. It is found in Argentina, mainland Chile, and the Juan Fernández Islands.

== Taxonomy and systematics ==
The green-backed firecrown is monotypic. It shares its genus only with the Juan Fernandez firecrown (S. fernandensis). The specific epithet sephaniodes is sometimes misspelled sephanoides to match the genus.

== Description ==
The green-backed firecrown is 10 to 10.5 cm (3.9 to 4.1 in) long. Males weigh about 5.5 g (0.19 oz) and females about 5 g (0.18 oz). The species is sexually dimorphic, with larger, short-billed males, and smaller, longer-billed females. Adults of both sexes have bronzy green upperparts, slaty green wings and tails, and pale buff underparts with black and green spots. Adult males have the eponymous iridescent red-yellow crown. Juveniles of both sexes have rusty feather edges on the head and their underparts have a cinnamon tone. Because the young are sexually monochromatic, it is difficult to assign a sex to them.

== Distribution and habitat ==
The green-backed firecrown is found in Chile from south of the Atacama Region all the way to the southern tip of South America, in the adjoining areas of southern Argentina, and east across central Argentina to the Atlantic coast. (See Behavior:Movement below for details.) An isolated population is found on Robinson Crusoe and Alejandro Selkirk Islands of the Juan Fernández group, some 770 km (420 nmi) off the Chilean coast. It has been recorded as a vagrant on the Falkland Islands. The species inhabits forest edges, plantations of introduced Eucalyptus, clearings, thickets, and gardens. It is an important pollinator for the temperate rainforest regions of southern South America. In elevation it ranges from sea level to above 2,000 m (6,600 ft).

== Behavior ==
=== Movement ===
The green-backed firecrown is resident in the Chilean matorral from south of the Atacama Region to approximately the Los Lagos Region and in adjoining western Argentina. It nests from Los Lagos all the way to the southern tip of South America in both Chile and adjoining Argentina. In the non-breeding season it winters in the lowlands of central Argentina as far east as the Atlantic coast. The Juan Fernandez Islands population is believed to be sedentary.

=== Feeding ===
The green-backed firecrown feeds on nectar from a variety of native and introduced flowering plants, favoring those of genera Abutilon, Embothrium and Fuchsia, and sometimes perches on flowers to feed rather than hovering. It is able to recall not only the nectar location among identical flowers but also to the location of the most rewarding nectar among less rewarding flowers. It is intensely territorial and has been noted to chase birds as large as caracaras.

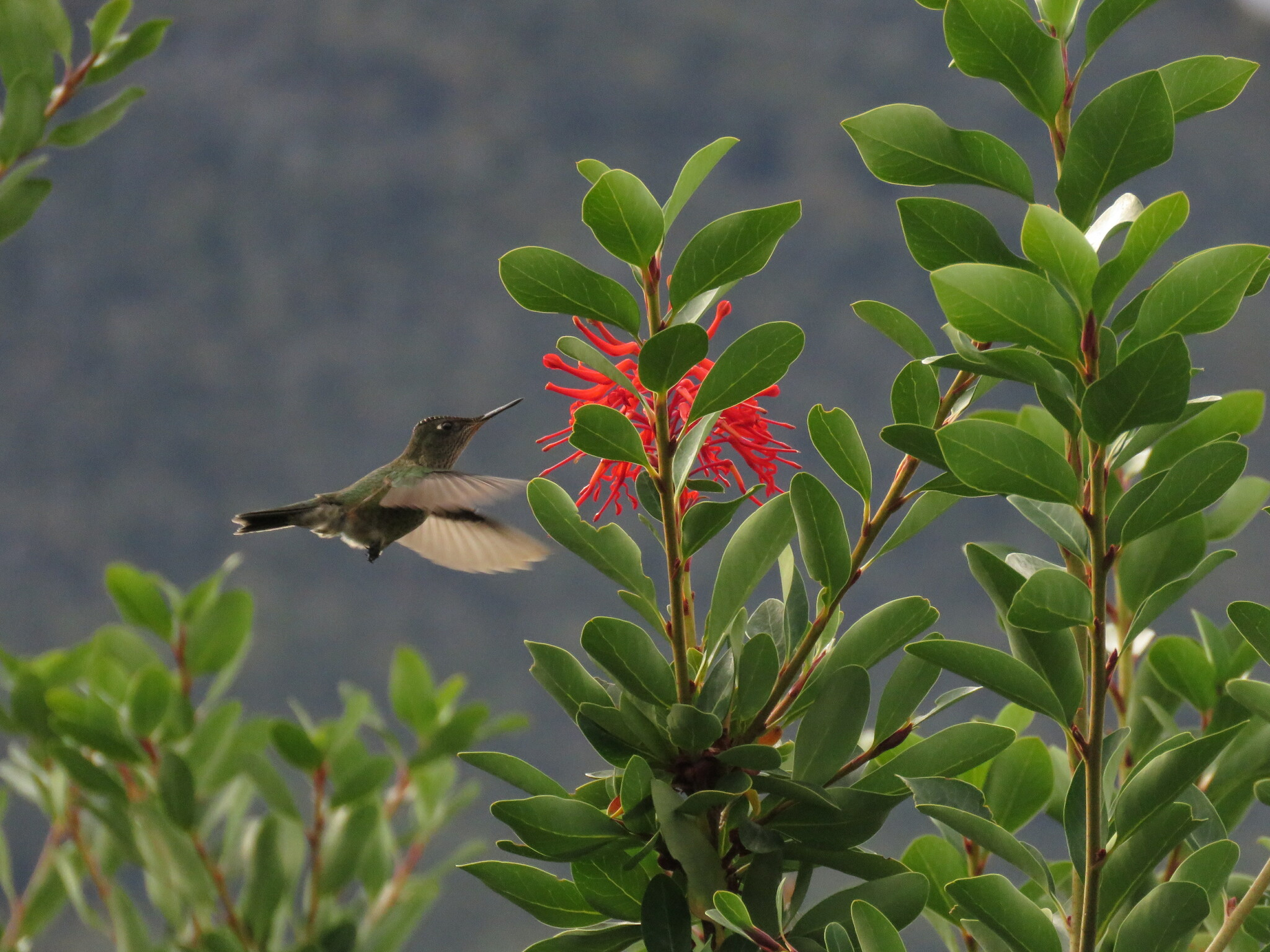
Feeding from native Chilean firebush

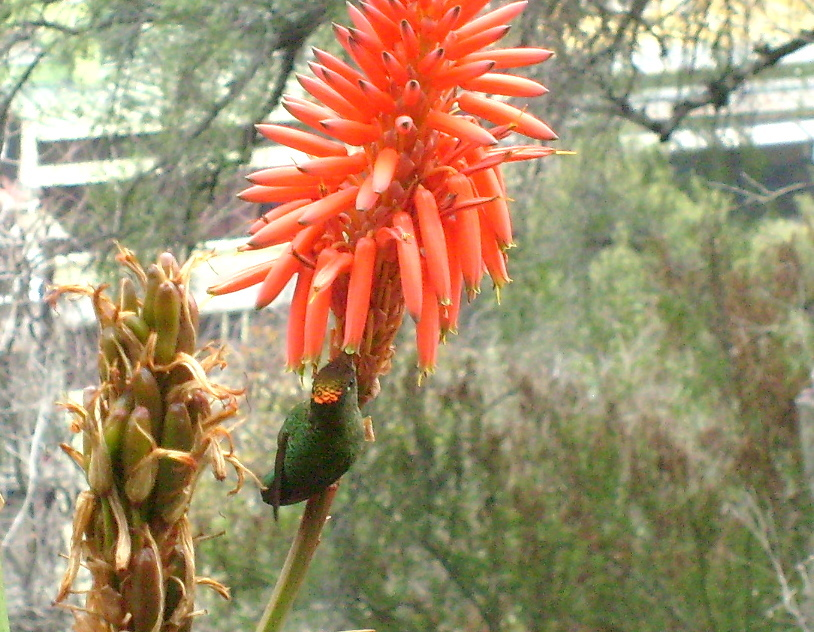
Perching while feeding from introduced Kniphofia

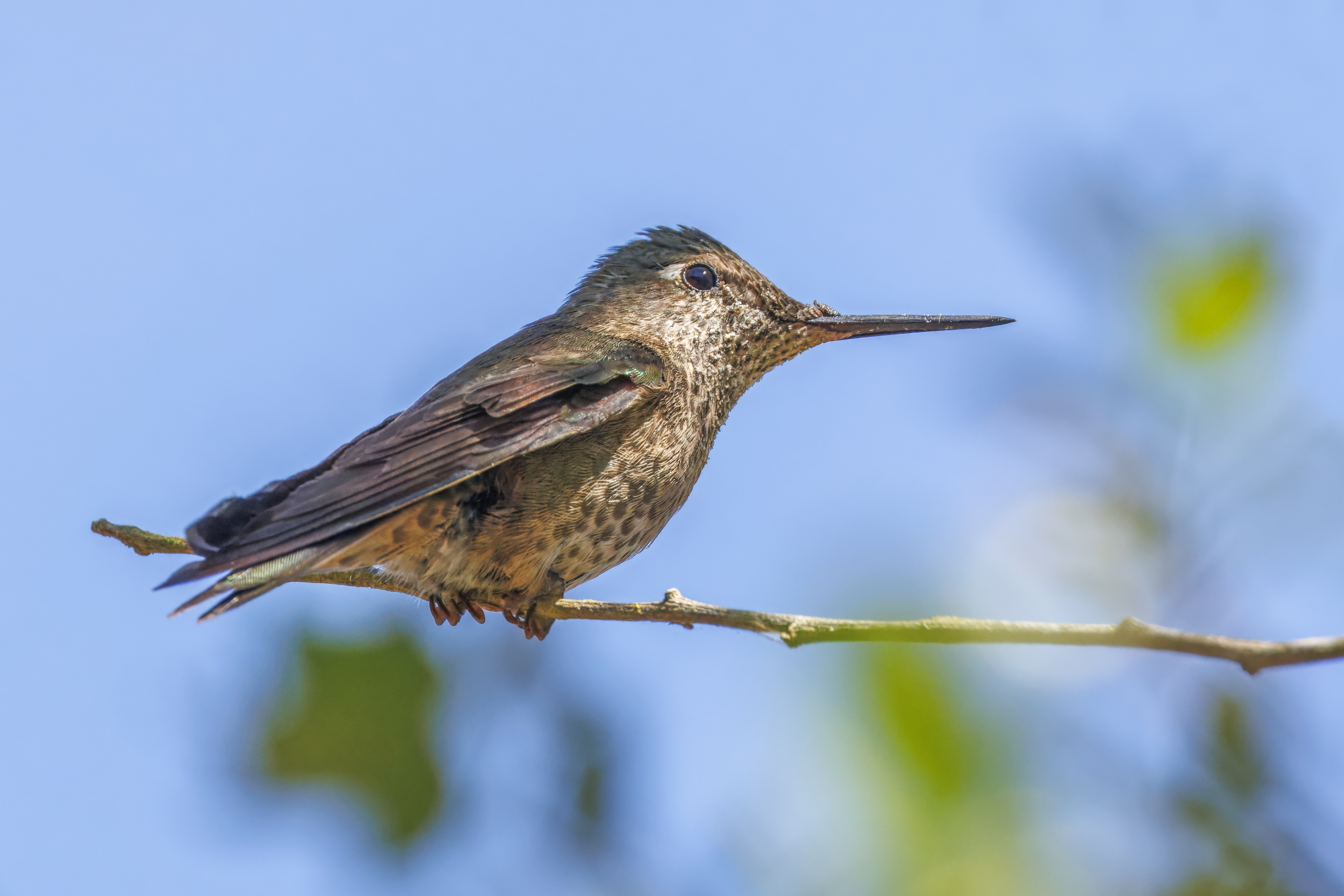
female

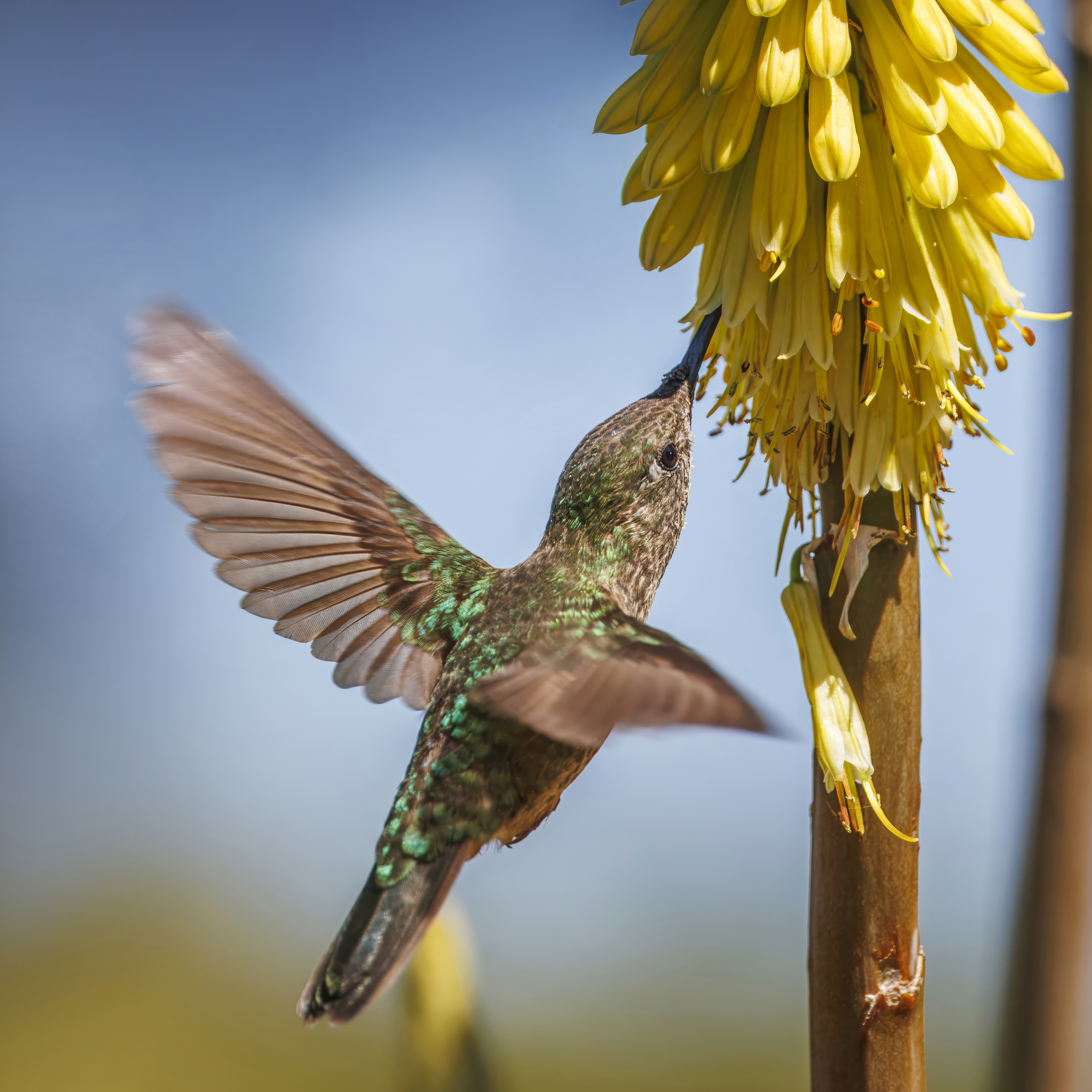
female feeding in flight on Kniphofia

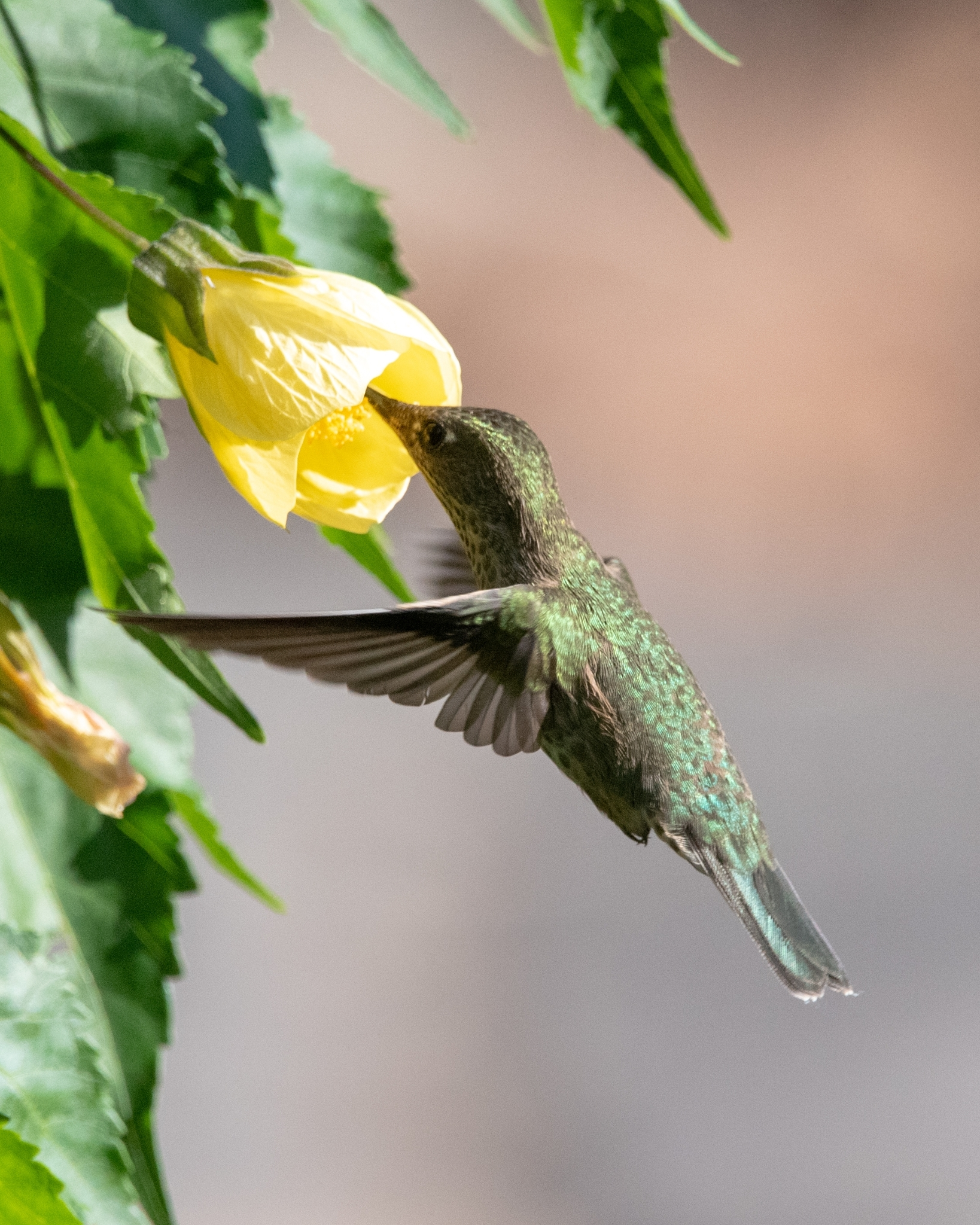
Feeding from Abutilon

=== Breeding ===
The green-backed firecrown's nesting season on the mainland spans from September to November; data are sparse but the season on Juan Fernández appears to be September to December. The nest is a very small cup that is sometimes placed above water, and is primarily composed of the rare moss Ancistrodes genuflexa. The clutch is two white eggs. Nothing else is known about the species' breeding phenology.

=== Vocalization ===
The green-backed firecrown's typical song is "a series of high-pitched notes interspersed by gravelly trills and squeaky notes, 'pseee...pseee...krrr.skee.skee.skee....psee...'." Its call is "a single 'psee' or 'skee'."

== Status ==
The IUCN has assessed the green-backed firecrown as being of Least Concern, though its population size is unknown and believed to be decreasing. It is locally common, and does well in human-altered landscapes such as city parks and gardens. In the Juan Fernandez Islands its population is believed to be about 5000 birds. It occurs in several protected areas on the mainland. No immediate threats have been identified.
