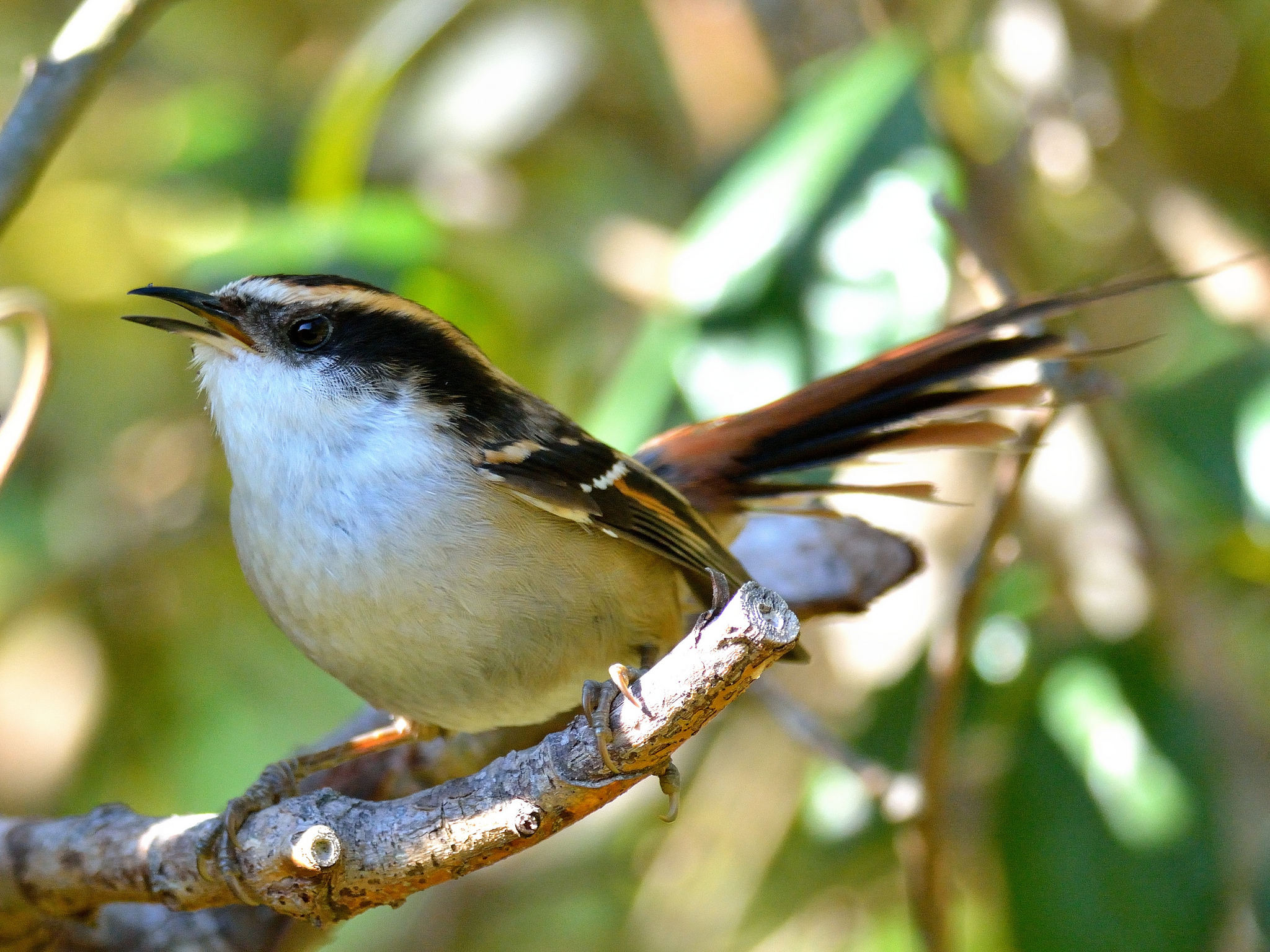

Conservation status
- Least Concern (IUCN 3.1)

Scientific classification
- Kingdom: Animalia
- Phylum: Chordata
- Class: Aves
- Order: Passeriformes
- Family: Furnariidae
- Genus: Aphrastura
- Species: A. spinicauda

Binomial name
- Aphrastura spinicauda (Gmelin, JF, 1789)

= Thorn-tailed rayadito =

Species of bird

The thorn-tailed rayadito (Aphrastura spinicauda), is a species of bird in the family Furnariidae. It is found in temperate forests and subtropical dry shrubland south of 30°S. Some sources suggest it may formerly have occurred in the Falkland Islands. It remains the most common and best-known native bird in temperate forests of Zona Austral and Zona Sur in Chile, often occurring at densities of well over one individual per hectare.

== Taxonomy ==
The thorn-tailed rayadito was formally described in 1789 by the German naturalist Johann Friedrich Gmelin in his revised and expanded edition of Carl Linnaeus's Systema Naturae. He placed it with the wagtails in the genus Motacilla and coined the binomial name Motacilla spinicauda. Gmelin based his description on the "thorn-tailed warbler" that had been described and illustrated by the English ornithologist John Latham in his book A General Synopsis of Birds. The naturalist Joseph Banks had provided Latham with a water-colour drawing of the bird by Georg Forster who had accompanied James Cook on his second voyage to the Pacific Ocean. The picture was drawn in December 1774 at the Tierra del Fuego. This picture is held by the Natural History Museum in London. The thorn-tailed rayadito is now placed with the Masafuera rayadito in the genus Aphrastura that was introduced in 1899 by the American ornithologist Harry C. Oberholser.

Four subspecies are recognised:

- A. s. spinicauda (Gmelin, JF, 1789) – central, south Chile and west, south Argentina
- A. s. bullocki Chapman, 1934 – Mocha Island (off Chile)
- A. s. fulva Angelini, 1905 – Chiloé Island (off Chile)
- A. s. subantarctica Rozzi, R, Quilodrán, CS, Botero-Delgadillo, E, Crego, RD, Napolitano, C, Barroso, O, Torres-Mura, JC & Vásquez, RA, 2022 – Diego Ramírez Islands (off extreme south Chile)

The subspecies A. s. subantarctica was described in 2022 as a separate species, the Subantarctic rayadito, on the basis of genetic, morphological, and behavioral evidence.

== Description ==
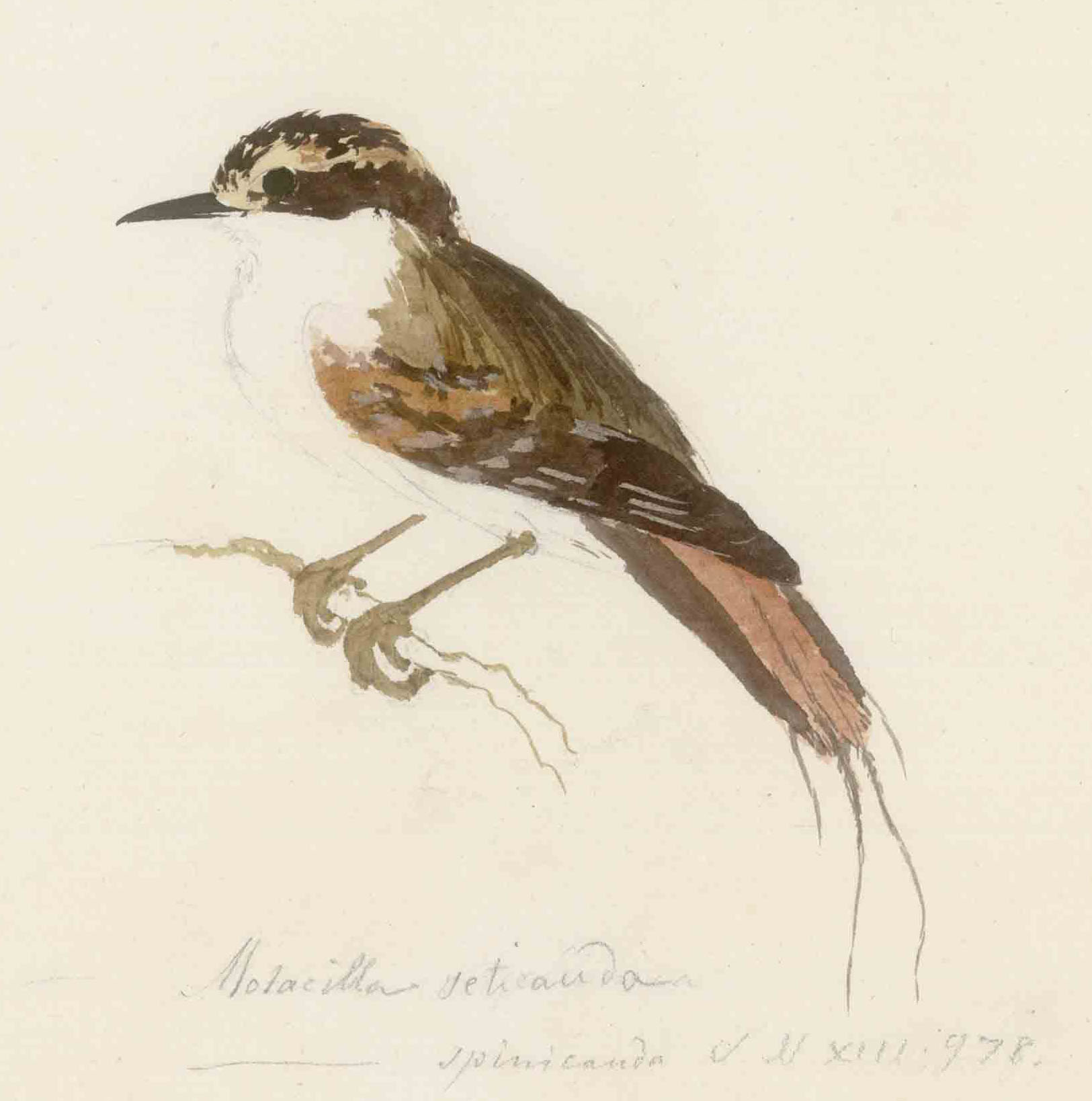
Watercolour made by Georg Forster on the island of Tierra del Fuego in 1774 on James Cook's second voyage to the Pacific Ocean

The thorn-tailed rayadito is approximately 14 centimetres (5.5 in) in length including the tail, and an average adult weighs around 11 grams (0.39 oz), with males being around 10 percent heavier than females. The most distinctive feature of a bird frequently compared to a tit is the long "thorn"-tail with twelve spiny rectrices, which gradually develops in juveniles as they mature. This thorn-tail is believed to be used, not to aid in climbing trees as in other funariids like the tit-spinetails, but to attract the opposite sex during courtship.

The plumage of the thorn-tailed rayadito is brown with several black lines above and generally white below in the nominate subspecies Aphrastura spinicauda spinicauda, whilst in Aphrastura spinicauda fulva of Chiloé the throat is cinnamon instead of white and in Aphrastura spinicauda bullocki of Mocha Island the dorsal side is entirely brown without black lines and the throat is white.

Typical voices of the thorn-tailed rayadito include:

1. A loud trill
2. An alarm call, described as a scolding "tsii...tsii...tsii"
3. A softer repetitive trill "trrrrrreet"-breeding sound used during non breeding season.

== Distribution and habitat ==
It is found in noisy flocks from central Chile and adjacent Argentina, south to Tierra del Fuego. A study of the refugia used by rayaditos when the Patagonian Ice Sheet covered most of the species' existing range shows that Mocha Island was the most prominent glacial refuge and suggests the possibility that the species was present in areas to the east of the ice sheet in Argentine Patagonia, creating considerable gene flow when most of the ice sheet melted.

== Behaviour and ecology ==
Like most furnariids, the thorn-tailed rayadito is exclusively insectivorous, and like the tits of the northern hemisphere it searches bark and moss surfaces for small insects. In the non-breeding season from March to September it forms large flocks with other Furnariidae species, though generally it is so numerous as to outnumber all other species combined and in almost half of all cases rayaditos are the only species present: at other times white-throated treerunners, striped woodpeckers and fire-eyed diucons may complement them. Rayaditos themselves usually occur in the non-breeding season in flocks of four to seven; however in the breeding season from October to February they are strongly pair-territorial.

Rayaditos are highly curious and fearless birds, and are inquisitive in the presence of humans in their forest habitat. They are adaptable to quite a wide range of forest types, from tall Nothofagus and Araucaria forests in the north to low subantarctic forests in the far south and relatively dry Austrocedrus forests in the east of their range. Rayaditos do not extend beyond the relatively dry cedar forest into the "scrub beech" further east, and generally do require corridors of considerable size if not so wide as many other endemic birds of Patagonian forests.

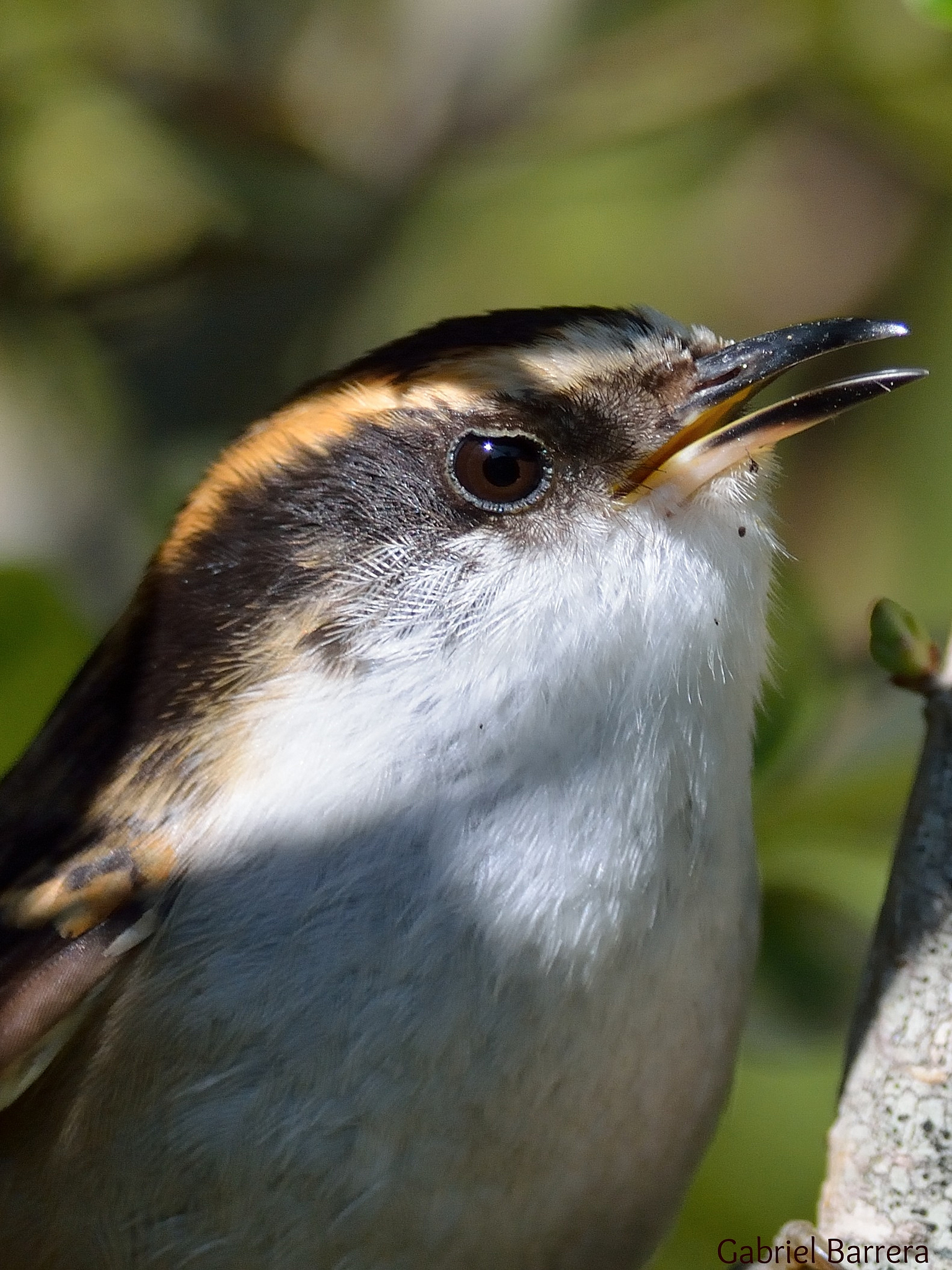
Rayadito Portrait

=== Breeding ===
The breeding biology of the thorn-tailed rayadito is the most comprehensively studied among the generally little-known avifauna of South America south of the Amazon Basin. Rayaditos, unlike most other furnariids, nest in secondary cavities in old trees, though there are a few reports that in the extreme south of their range they will opportunistically choose to nest in ground level cavities and they willingly accept nest boxes.

Rayaditos breed between October and January, typically laying three or four eggs. Occasionally more are laid though there is little evidence more than four young ever fledge from a nest. The most striking feature of rayaditos and indeed most furnariids is the very large size of the eggs: though not as large as those of the related Des Murs's wiretail, they are still about fifty percent larger than expected for an 11-gram passerine. Because of their large eggs, rayadito females (and indeed all other documented furnariids) lay eggs only every other day, akin to other south temperate passerines like the rifleman and thornbills, though their incubation periods are not as long.

Although rayaditos were historically thought to be multi-brooded, the first detailed breeding studies conducted on Chiloé suggest each pair typically raises only a single clutch per year, and that reduction of clutches after laying by discarding eggs is not unknown, though brood reduction by this method has generally been exceptionally rarely seen and thought to be absent from south temperate passerines. Growth of nestlings is distinctly slow: fledging lasts twenty-one days and postfledging parental care around thirty days. The latter is distinctly longer than in north temperate species at the same distance from the equator, but not nearly so long as in many tropical, Australian and southern African passerines where young are not independent for over sixty days. Rayaditos may travel with their parents during the non-breeding season though this is not yet investigated. The oldest known rayadito based on banding studies was six years and four months old, though potential longevity is unknown.
