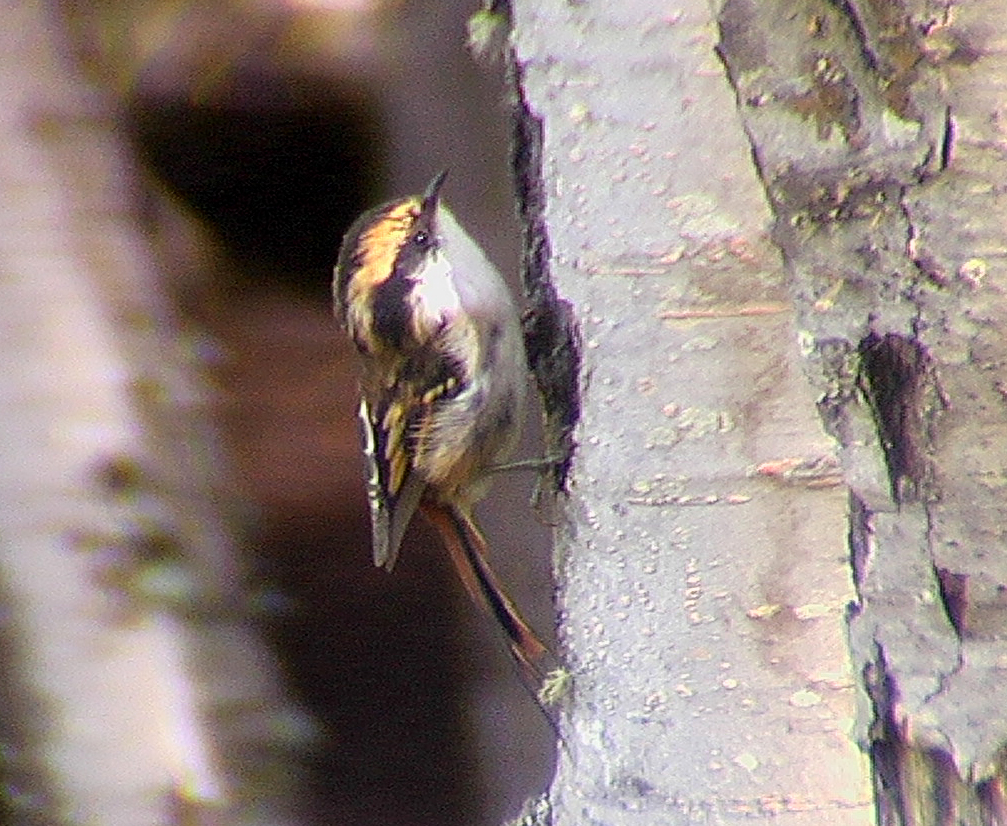
- Thorn-tailed rayadito, Aphrastura spinicauda

Scientific classification
- Kingdom: Animalia
- Phylum: Chordata
- Class: Aves
- Order: Passeriformes
- Family: Furnariidae
- Genus: Aphrastura; Oberholser, 1899

Type species
- Motacilla spinicauda Gmelin, 1789

Species
- See text

= Aphrastura =

Genus of birds

Aphrastura, the rayaditos, is a genus of birds in the family Furnariidae.

== Taxonomy ==
The genus Aphrastura was introduced in 1899 by the American ornithologist Harry C. Oberholser with the thorn-tailed rayadito as the type species. The name genus name combines the Ancient Greek aphrastos meaning "marvellous" with oura meaning "tail".

The genus contains the following species:

- Thorn-tailed rayadito, Aphrastura spinicauda
- Masafuera rayadito, Aphrastura masafuerae
