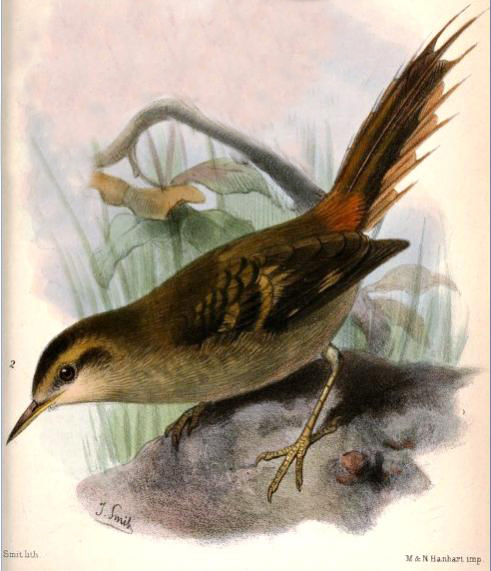

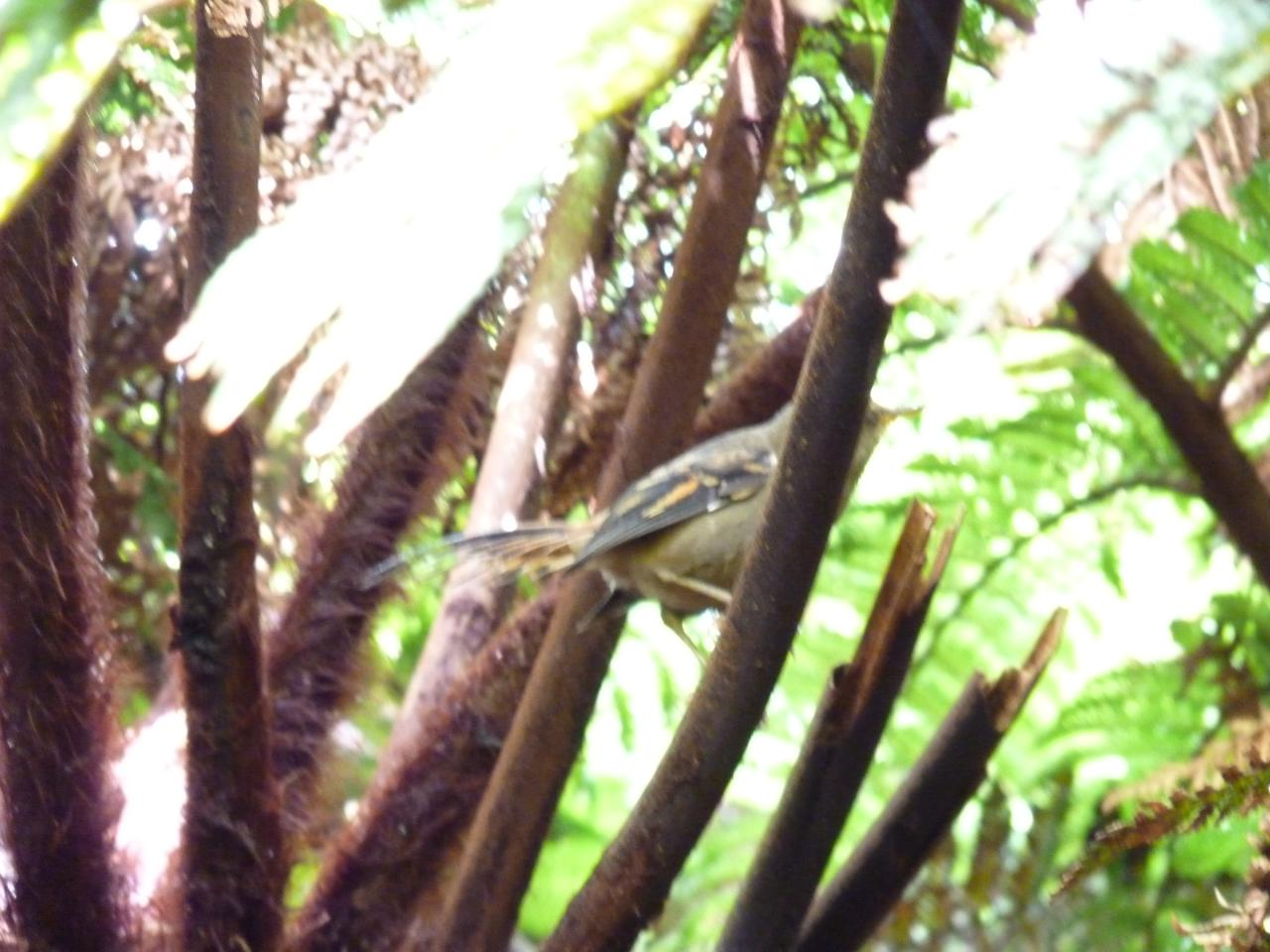

Conservation status
- Critically Endangered (IUCN 3.1)

Scientific classification
- Kingdom: Animalia
- Phylum: Chordata
- Class: Aves
- Order: Passeriformes
- Family: Furnariidae
- Genus: Aphrastura
- Species: A. masafuerae

Binomial name
- Aphrastura masafuerae (Philippi & Landbeck, 1866)

= Masafuera rayadito =

Species of bird

The Masafuera rayadito (Aphrastura masafuerae) is a Critically Endangered species of bird in the Furnariinae subfamily of the ovenbird family Furnariidae. It is endemic to Alejandro Selkirk Island (Isla Más Afuera, Outermost Island) in the Juan Fernández Islands of Chile.

== Taxonomy and systematics ==
The Masafuera rayadito is monotypic. It shares genus Aphrastura with the thorn-tailed rayadito (M. spinicauda) of the South American mainland. They are thought to have diverged in the Pleistocene.

== Description ==
The Masafuera rayadito is 14 to 15 cm (5.5 to 5.9 in) long. The sexes have the same plumage. Adults have a poorly defined buff-brown supercilium on a dusky face. Their forehead is whitish with narrow rufous streaks and their crown is dark dusky brown. Their back is dull brown and their rump rufous-brown. Their wing coverts are blackish with tawny tips and their flight feathers are blackish with dull rufous bases. Their tail is mostly rufous with blackish bases on all but the central pair of feathers; the ends of the feathers lack barbs, giving a spiny appearance. Their throat is whitish, their breast and belly dull buffy gray-brown with a rufescent tinge, and their flanks and undertail coverts rufescent. Their iris is brown, their maxilla horn-brown or yellowish white with a horn tinge, their mandible yellowish horn, and their legs and feet horn-gray.

== Distribution and habitat ==
The Masafuera rayadito is found only on Alejandro Selkirk Island in the Juan Fernández Archipelago, about 670 km (360 nmi; 420 mi) off the coast of Chile. It inhabits thick undergrowth in semi-humid to humid montane scrub and also wooded areas with much Dicksonia externa tree fern. It often occurs along streams, and often in stands of the canelo tree Drimys confertifolia. In elevation it usually occurs between 800 and 1,300 m (2,600 and 4,300 ft) but occasionally goes as low as 400 m (1,300 ft) in the austral winter.

== Behavior ==
=== Movement ===
The Masafuera rayadito is mostly resident but makes some downslope movement in winter.

=== Feeding ===
The Masafuera rayadito's diet is not well known, but is probably mostly arthropods. It almost always forages in pairs, usually in the understorey but sometimes in leaf litter on the ground. It feeds often on ferns, sometimes hanging upside down as it gleans from fronds. It also hunts in moss and lichens on the canelo tree.

=== Breeding ===
The Masafuear rayadito's breeding season includes at least December and January. It makes a nest of plant fibers in a natural cavity on a cliff face, and also in nest boxes provided by humans. The clutch size, incubation period, and time to fledging are not known. Both parents provision nestlings.

=== Vocalization ===
As of September 2023, neither xeno-canto nor the Cornell Lab of Ornithology's Macaulay Library had any recordings of Masafuera rayadito vocalizations. Its call is described as "a low churring 'trrrt' c. 1·2 seconds long, singly or repeated".

== Status ==
The IUCN originally assessed the Masafuerea rayadito in 1988 as Threatened, then in 1994 as Vulnerable, but since 2005 as Critically Endangered. It has an extremely small range on one small island and very strict habitat requirements. Surveys of the species in the 1980s found about 500 birds but by 2002 only 140 were documented. As of 2018 its population is estimated at between 50 and 250 mature individuals and is believed to be stable. "Introduced mammalian predators are thought to have a significant impact on the population, with rats (Rattus spp.) and possibly mice (Mus musculus) impacting on brood survival, and feral cats impacting on juvenile and adult survival." In addition, "a large proportion of natural vegetation on the island has been degraded and fragmented by goat-trampling, fire and timber-cutting".
