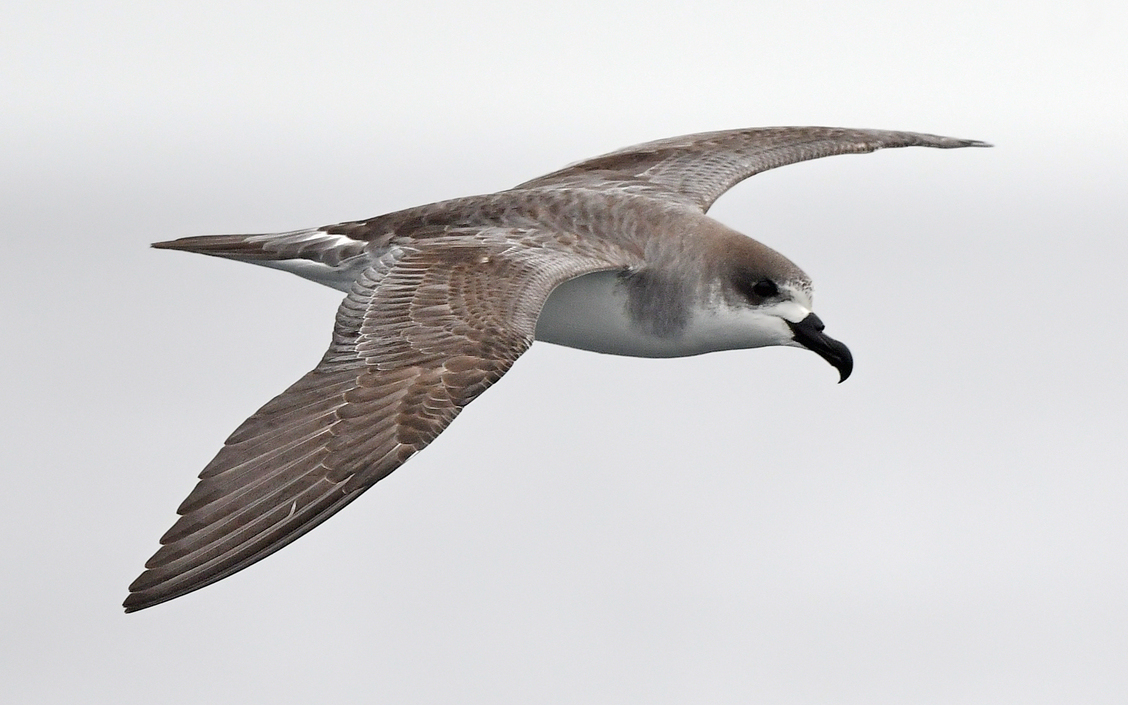

Conservation status
- Vulnerable (IUCN 3.1)

Scientific classification
- Kingdom: Animalia
- Phylum: Chordata
- Class: Aves
- Order: Procellariiformes
- Family: Procellariidae
- Genus: Pterodroma
- Species: P. externa

Binomial name
- Pterodroma externa (Salvin, 1875)

= Juan Fernández petrel =

Species of bird

The Juan Fernández petrel (Pterodroma externa) is a species of seabird in the family Procellariidae. It nests on a single island off the coast of Chile, in the Juan Fernández Archipelago. It was previously classified as a subspecies of the white-necked petrel (Pterodroma cervicalis), which is found in tropical waters of the Pacific and Indian Oceans.

== Description ==
The Juan Fernández petrel is a large species of gadfly petrel, 43 cm (17 in) long with a wingspan of 95–97 cm (37–38 in) and a mass of 500 g (1.1 lb). The upperparts are dark brownish-grey and there is a black M-shaped marking across the extended wings. The underparts are white, with the underside of the wing is edged black. The face is white, with a black "cap" extending below the eyes. The feet are yellow, dark brown at the tips. The bill is black with a hooked tip and houses the tubular nostrils that are unique to Procellariiformes.

== Behaviour ==
=== Breeding ===
Nesting habitat is high elevation (above 750 m (2,460 ft)) ridges, where it digs a 2–3 m (6 ft 7 in – 9 ft 10 in) burrow to raise one chick per year. Females lay a single, white egg in mid-November and both birds in a pair will take turns incubating the egg for about 60 days. The chick hatches in mid-February and is fed by both parents for 90–100 days before fledging in May. The chick remains underground in the burrow until it has reached fledgling mass and is fully feathered. Chicks are fed a diet consisting mainly of regurgitated fish and squid.

== Distribution and status ==
During the breeding season, the petrels forage in waters surrounding Isla Alejandro Selkirk and Isla Robinson Crusoe (both islands in the Juan Fernández Archipelago), as well as coastal Chile. The birds can be found in flocks with pink-footed shearwaters and other seabirds. During the non-breeding season, the petrels forage in the equatorial currents and counter-currents, as far north as the Hawaiian Islands. It has been recorded as a vagrant in Australia, the Chatham Islands in New Zealand, Fiji, and the United States (in Arizona and Oregon).

The petrel breeds only on one island in Chile, Isla Alejandro Selkirk. The breeding population was estimated at 1 million pairs in 1985–86, and there may be up to 3–5 million birds globally. It is threatened at its nesting sites by predation from introduced species (cats and rats) and, to a lesser extent, from habitat loss caused by introduced herbivores (goats). The IUCN Red List lists the species as vulnerable due to its endemic status and threats from introduced predators.
