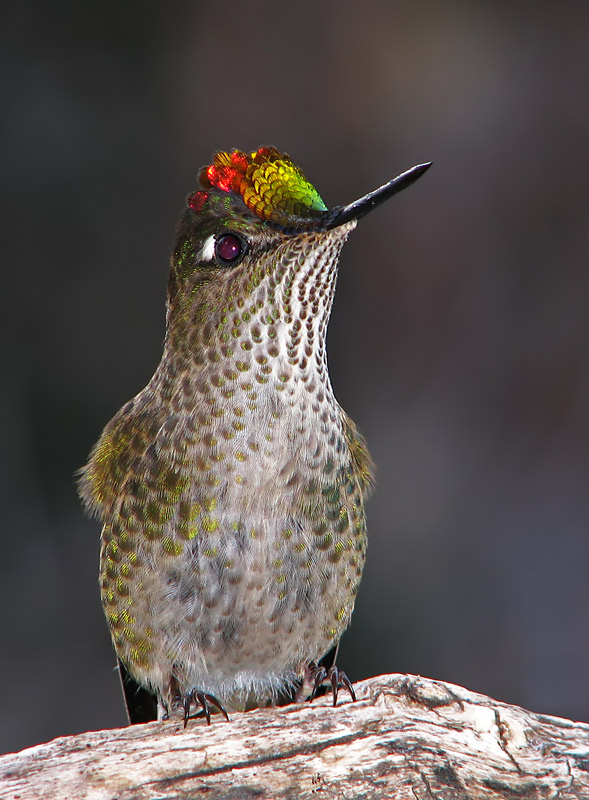
- Green-backed firecrown (Sephanoides sephaniodes)

Scientific classification
- Kingdom: Animalia
- Phylum: Chordata
- Class: Aves
- Order: Apodiformes
- Family: Trochilidae
- Tribe: Lesbiini
- Genus: Sephanoides; G.R. Gray, 1840

Type species
- Mellisuga kingii Vigors, 1827

Species
- S. sephaniodes S. fernandensis

= Firecrown =

Genus of birds

The firecrowns are the genus Sephanoides of the hummingbirds.

== Species ==
There are two species.

Genus Sephanoides – G.R. Gray, 1840 – two species
Common name	Scientific name and subspecies	Range	Size and ecology	IUCN status and estimated population
Green-backed firecrown	Sephanoides sephaniodes (Lesson & Garnot, 1827)	Argentina and Chile	Size: Habitat: Diet:	LC
Juan Fernández firecrown	Sephanoides fernandensis (King, 1831) Two subspecies: S. f. fernandensis; †S. f. leyboldi	Isla Róbinson Crusoe, Chile	Size: Habitat: Diet:	CR

The green-backed firecrown occurs widely in Argentina and Chile, but the Juan Fernández firecrown is found solely on Isla Róbinson Crusoe, one of a three-island archipelago belonging to Chile.

Both species will hang from flower petals or leaves with their feet. They feed on nectar and insects
