= Alejandro Selkirk Island =

Island of Chile

Native name: Isla Alejandro Selkirk
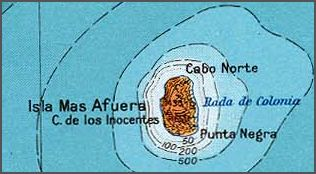
- A map of Alejandro Selkirk Island

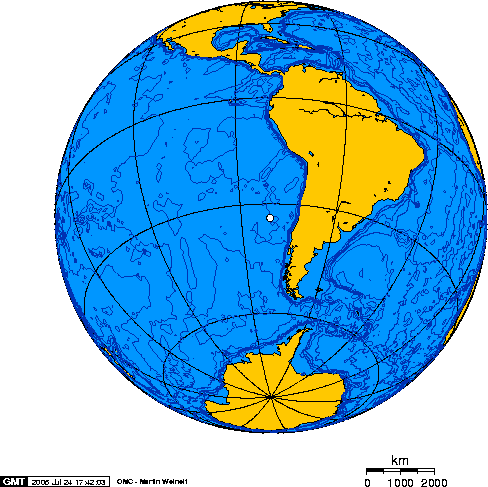

Geography
- Location: Pacific Ocean
- Coordinates: 33°45′04″S 80°47′00″W
- Type: Volcanic island
- Archipelago: Juan Fernández Islands
- Area: 49.5 km^{2} (19.1 sq mi)
- Highest elevation: 1,268 m (4160 ft)
- Highest point: Cerro de Los Inocentes

Administration
- Chile

Demographics
- Population: 57

Alejandro Selkirk Island (Spanish: Isla Alejandro Selkirk), previously known as Más Afuera (Farther Out (to Sea)), is the largest and most westerly island in the Juan Fernández Archipelago of the Valparaíso Region of Chile. The island was renamed after the marooned sailor Alexander Selkirk despite the fact that Selkirk was marooned on what is now Robinson Crusoe Island, situated 180 km (100 nmi; 110 mi) to the east.

The Archipelago was home to the marooned sailor Alexander Selkirk from 1704 to 1709, and is thought to have inspired English novelist Daniel Defoe's fictional Robinson Crusoe in his 1719 novel about the character (although the novel is explicitly set in the Caribbean, not in the Juan Fernández Islands). This was just one of several survival stories from the period that Defoe would have been aware of. To reflect the literary lore associated with the island and attract tourists, the Chilean government renamed the place Alejandro Selkirk Island in 1966.

== Geography ==
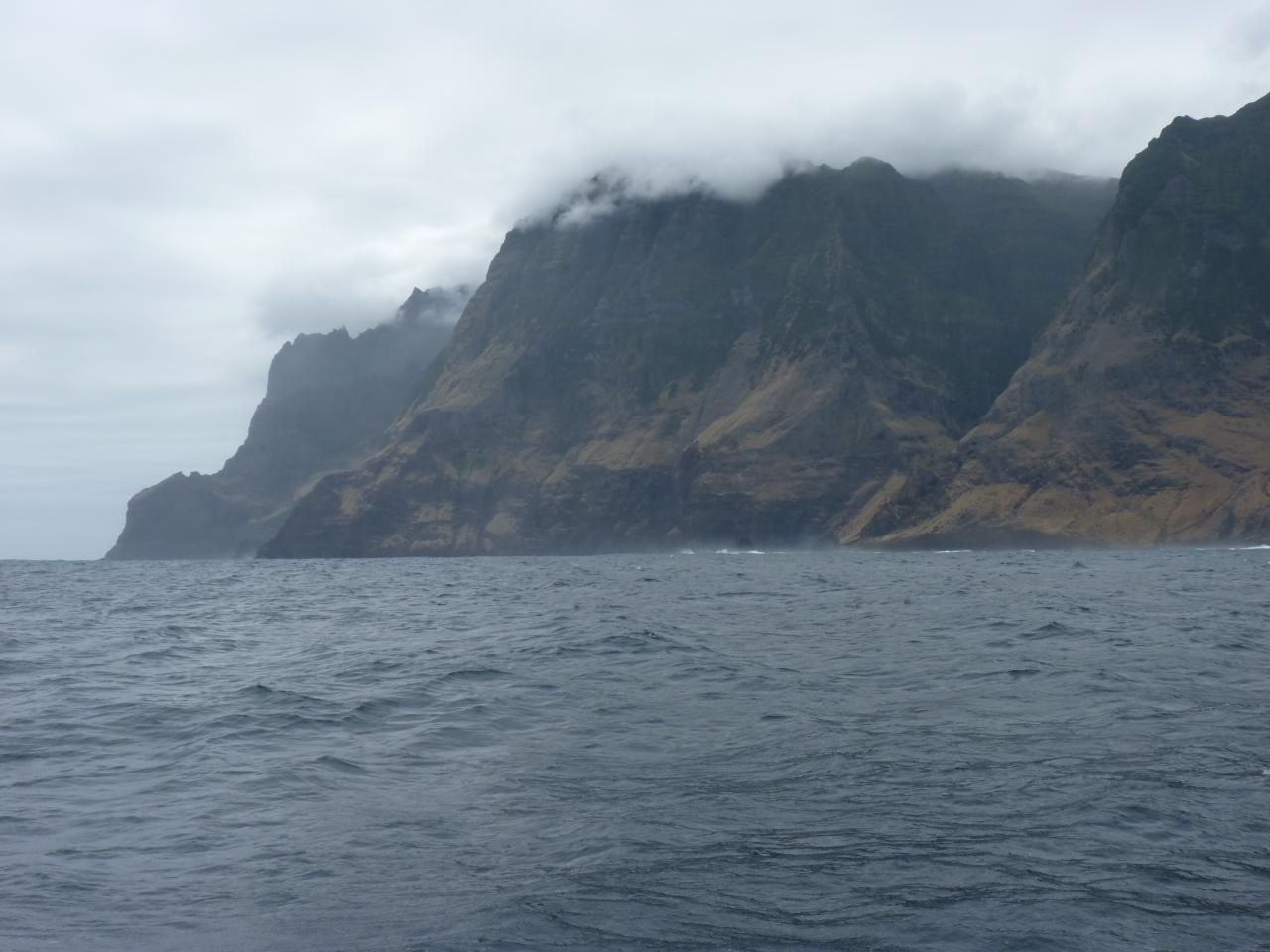
A view of Alejandro Selkirk Island

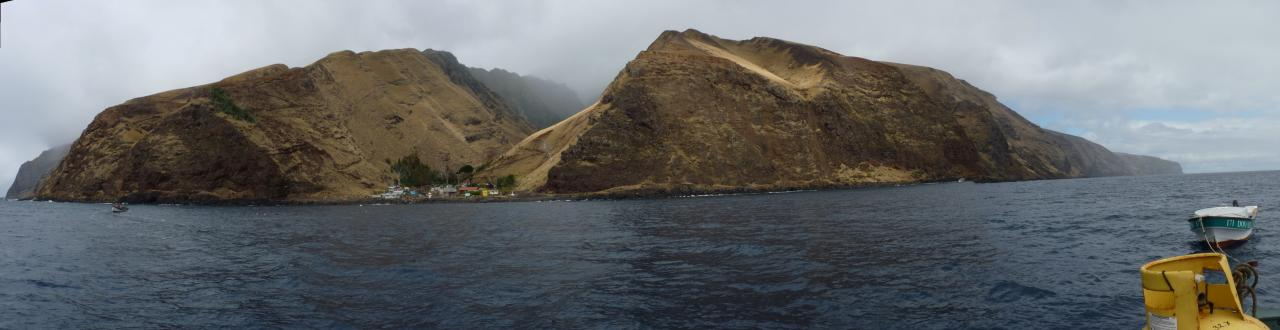
Alejandro Selkirk

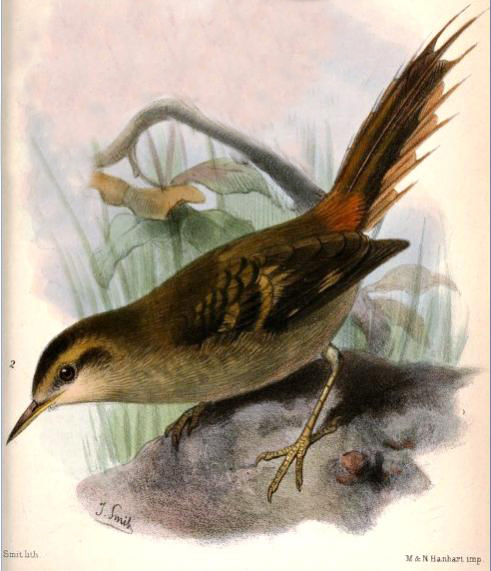
The Masafuera rayadito is endemic to Alejandro Selkirk

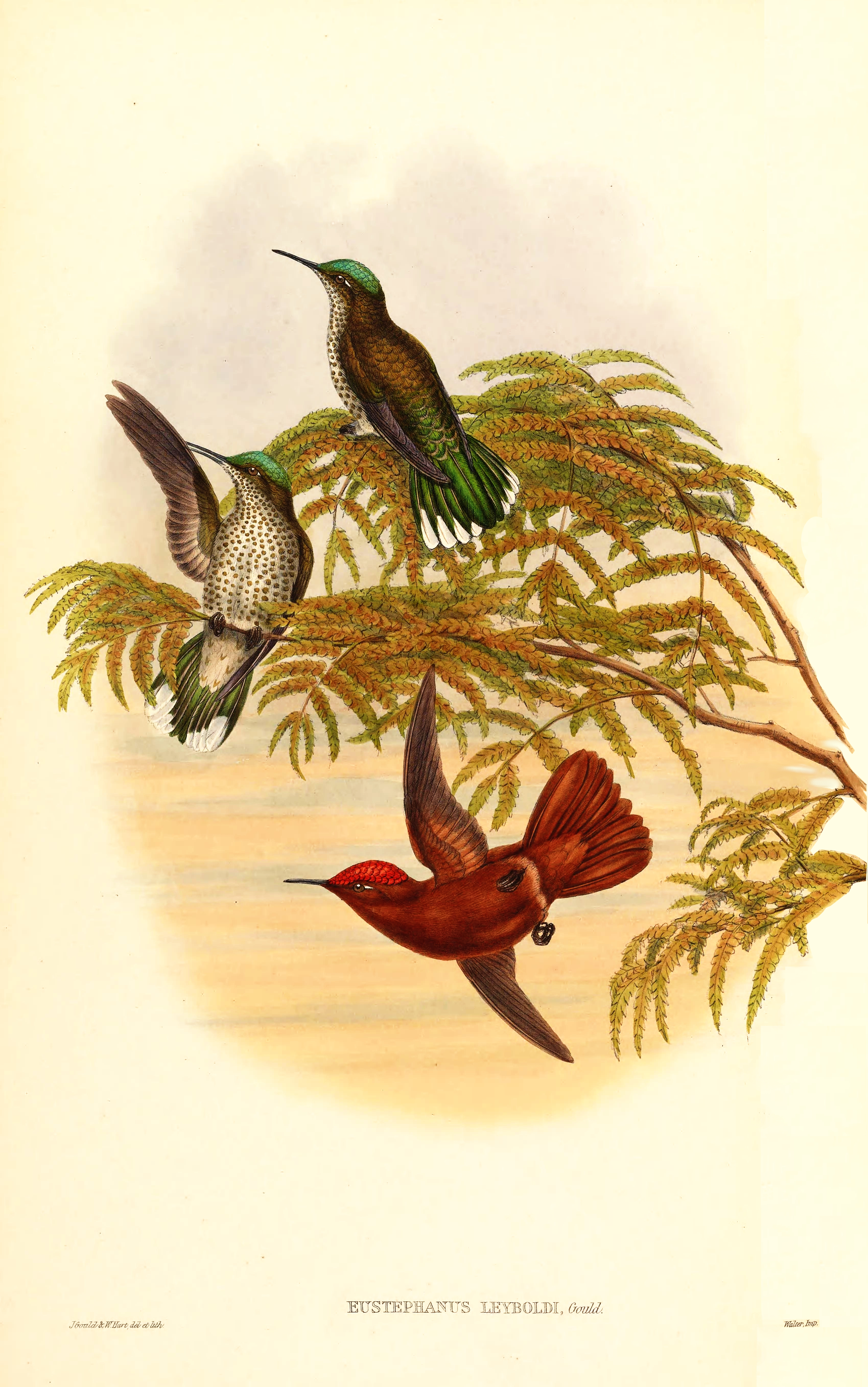
The extinct Alejandro Selkirk firecrown, Sephanoides fernandensis leyboldi

The island measures 11 km (7 mi) north–south and 6 km (4 mi) east–west, and has an area of 49.5 km^{2} (19.1 sq mi). It is densely wooded and very mountainous and is marked by ridges and numerous deep ravines lead to a steep, rugged coast on the east side of the island off which are tremendous depths. The coastal cliffs are up to 1,000 m (3,300 ft) high. The south, west and north sides of the island have sandy strips of beach which extend 161 m (528 ft) offshore in places. The highest peak, Cerro de Los Inocentes, rises to 1,268 m (4,160 ft) in the southwest part of Alejandro Selkirk Island, where there is also a prominent rock with a hole through it.

Landing is possible near the center of the east shore at Quebrada Sánchez (Sánchez Ravine), and at the foot of Quebrada Las Casas (La Casas Ravine) 33°45′S 80°43′W), where there is a boat slip and buildings of the former penal colony. Anchorage can be taken about 0.3 mi (480 m) east-northeast of Quebrada Sánchez (33°43′S 80°44′W), in depths of 40.2 to 49.4 m (132 to 162 ft). The ravine is recognized by a white patch on a hill near it. Anchorage can also be taken, in depths of 31.1 to 50 m (102 to 164 ft), with sand bottom, off Rada de la Colonia.

Alejandro Selkirk Island is the emergent summit of a submarine shield volcano that formed during the Pleistocene epoch. Dating of rocks on the island show that it is the youngest of the Juan Fernández Islands at an age of 1–2 million years old. Due to its young age, the island shows little evidence of erosion. According to some early reports, now disputed, about 59 km (32 nmi) southwest of the island is the submerged Sefton Reef (36°43′S 83°15′W), almost reaching sea level, and 47 km (25 nmi) to northwest, Yosemite Rock (32°04′S 83°14′W). Podesta Island, once reported to lie farther to the west, is a phantom island.

== Climate ==
Alejandro Selkirk has a subtropical climate, moderated by the cold Humboldt Current and the southeast trade winds. Temperatures range from 3 °C (37 °F) to 34 °C (93 °F), with an annual mean of 15.4 °C (59.7 °F). Higher elevations are generally cooler. Average annual precipitation is 1,081 mm (42.6 in), varying from 318 mm (12.5 in) to 1,698 mm (66.9 in) year to year. Rainfall is higher in the winter months, and varies with elevation and exposure; elevations above 500 m (1,640 ft) experience almost daily rainfall.

== Flora and fauna ==
The Juan Fernández fur seal is known to have existed during the late 17th century on the island with the population of the seals on Alejandro Selkirk Island and Robinson Crusoe Island believed to be in excess of four million by the late 17th century. A census of 1797 estimated a population 2–3 million fur seals. The species was hunted to near extinction by the 19th century and was thought to be extinct for 100 years until 200 were found on the island in 1965. Since then, the population has grown steadily at 15% to 20% every year. The Masafuera rayadito is endemic to Alejandro Selkirk and one of the rarest South American birds with only 140 individuals left. The Alejandro Selkirk firecrown, Sephanoides fernandensis leyboldi, an endemic subspecies of the Juan Fernández firecrown, became extinct in 1908 due to feral goats and other introduced animals. The island has been recognised as an Important Bird Area (IBA) by BirdLife International because it supports populations of Stejneger's and Juan Fernandez petrels, as well as the Masafuera rayaditos.

The flora on the island is in the Fernandezian floristic region, in the Antarctic floristic kingdom, but often also included within the Neotropical kingdom. Endemic plant families include Lactoridaceae, with endemic plant genera also found.

== History ==
Throughout much of its history, the island has been uninhabited. There was formerly a penal settlement along the middle of the east coast, at 33°45′49″S 80°45′27″W. About 20 buildings can be made out on detailed satellite images. The settlement was operative from 1909. It initially housed 190 criminals, while there were as many as 160 political prisoners from 1927 to 1930. The penal colony was abandoned in 1930. Recently, the island has seen regular settlement, with 57 people living on the island as of the 2012 census.

In 1966 the Chilean government renamed Isla Más Afuera as Alejandro Selkirk Island, with Isla Más a Tierra becoming Robinson Crusoe Island. Alexander Selkirk was a Scottish sailor who was marooned as a castaway on Más a Tierra (then uninhabited) from 1704 to 1709. His story of survival likely inspired the 1719 novel Robinson Crusoe by Daniel Defoe.

== See also ==
- Flora of the Juan Fernández Islands
- Endemic flora of the Juan Fernández Islands
- Endemic fauna of the Juan Fernández Islands
