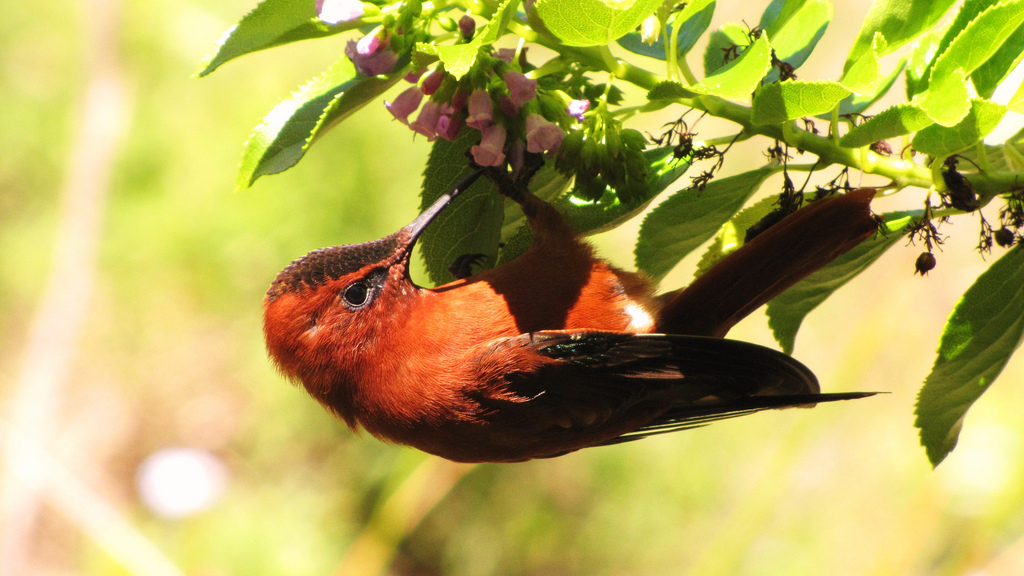
- Adult male feeding on Cuminia eriantha flowers

Conservation status
- Critically Endangered (IUCN 3.1)
- CITES Appendix II

Scientific classification
- Kingdom: Animalia
- Phylum: Chordata
- Class: Aves
- Order: Apodiformes
- Family: Trochilidae
- Genus: Sephanoides
- Species: S. fernandensis

Binomial name
- Sephanoides fernandensis (King, 1831)

= Juan Fernández firecrown =

Species of hummingbird

The Juan Fernández firecrown (Sephanoides fernandensis) is a hummingbird that is critically endangered in the "coquettes", tribe Lesbiini of subfamily Lesbiinae. It is endemic to Isla Róbinson Crusoe, one of the three-island Juan Fernández archipelago belonging to Chile.

== Taxonomy and systematics ==
The Juan Fernández firecrown was formally described in 1831 by the Royal Navy officer Phillip Parker King under the binomial name Trochilus fernandensis based on a specimen collected on the Juan Fernández Islands. The journal is the predecessor of the Zoological Society of London</ref> It is now placed with the green-backed firecrown (S. sephaniodes) in the genus Sephanoides. It has one existing subspecies, the nominate S. f. fernandensis. Most worldwide taxonomic systems attribute a second subspecies to it, the extinct S. f. leyboldi. They list it as having occurred on another island in the Juan Fernández group, Alejandro Selkirk Island (also called Más Afuera). However, at least one author questions the two-subspecies treatment and whether a firecrown ever inhabited Selkirk.

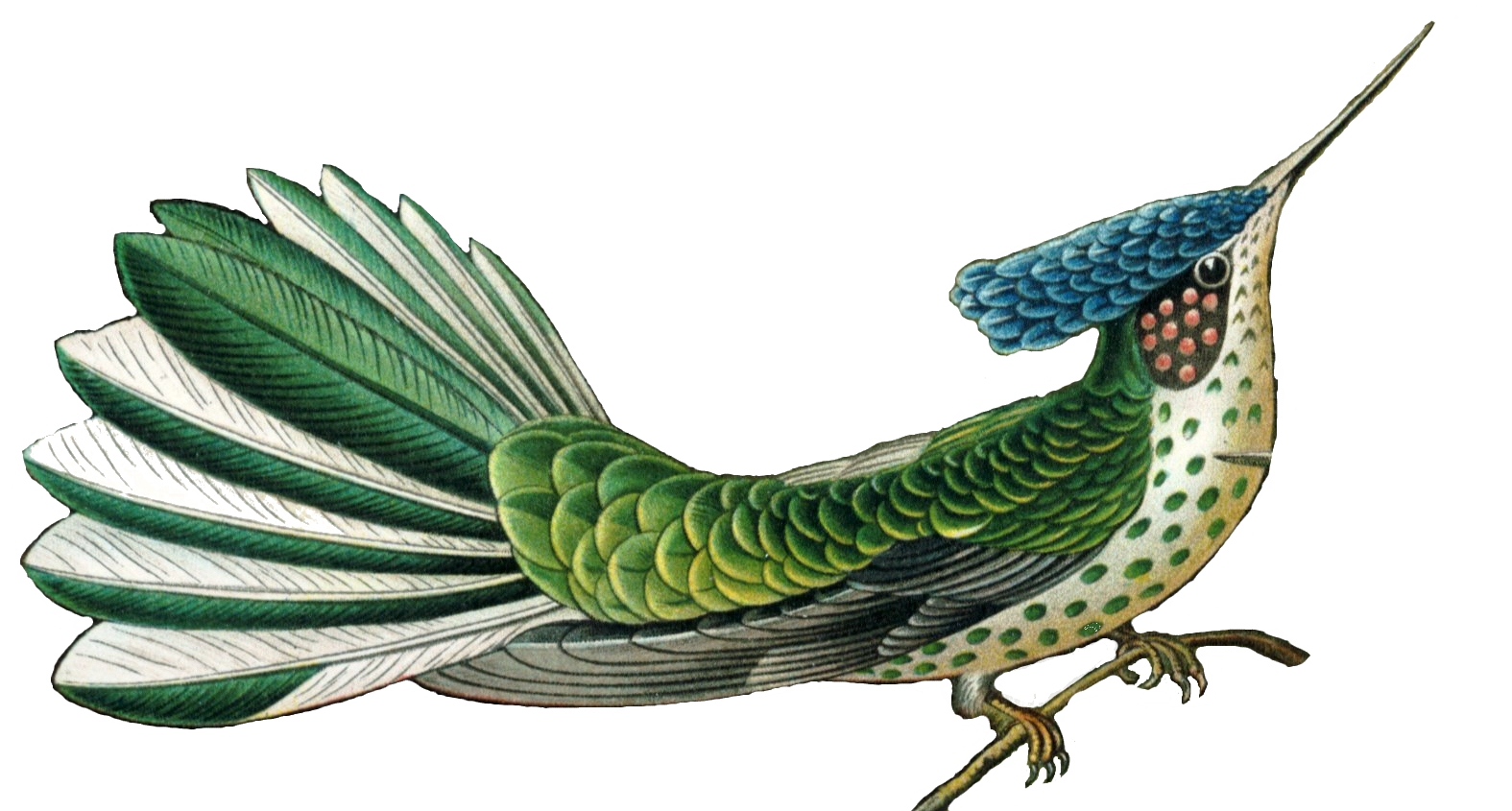
Adult female drawn from a millinery specimen

== Description ==
The Juan Fernández firecrown is among the most radically sexually dimorphic hummingbirds. The male and female plumages are so different, and even the female has a male-like iridescent crown, that in the 19th century they were thought to be different species until a nest was discovered with one of each sex. Males are 11.5 to 12 cm (4.5 to 4.7 in) long and weigh about 10.9 g (0.38 oz). Females are about 10.5 cm (4.1 in) long and weigh about 6.8 g (0.24 oz). Both sexes have a straight black bill.

The male is almost entirely cinnamon-orange. Its forehead and crown are iridescent fiery reddish yellow and the wings a dark coppery gray. The female's upperparts are bluish green with an iridescent bluish purple crown. Its underparts are pure white with black and green disks and the wings slaty green. The central tail feathers and the inner webs of the others are blue-green and the outer webs white.

== Distribution and habitat ==
The nominate subspecies of Juan Fernández firecrown is found only on Isla Róbinson Crusoe in the Juan Fernández Islands of Chile. The putative extinct subspecies S. f. leyboldi is attributed to Alejandro Selkirk Island.

The species inhabits forests, thickets, and gardens, favoring shady areas. In summer, males are frequently seen in the island's only town, San Juan Bautista, feeding on the flowers of trees in Sonchus subgenus Dendroseris which are endemic to the island chain, and many of which are themselves critically endangered species. All of the breeding records are at elevations between 120 and 660 m (390 and 2,200 ft).

== Behavior ==
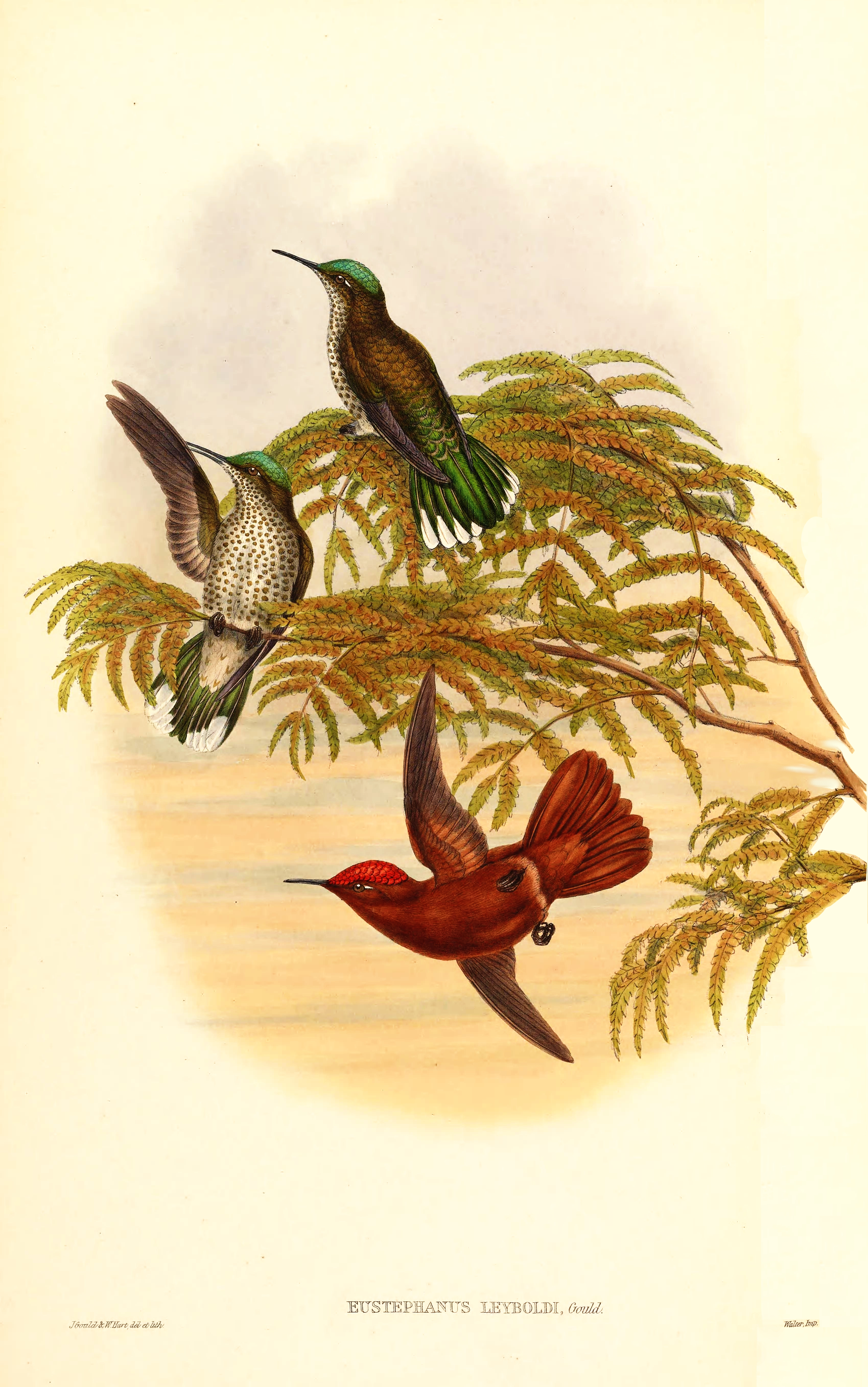
The putative extinct subspecies S. f. leyboldi

=== Movement ===
The Juan Fernández firecrown moves around the island, presumably in search of flowering plants, but is otherwise sedentary.

=== Feeding ===
The Juan Fernández firecrown forages for nectar at the flowers of native plants, especially Rhaphithamnus venustus and Sonchus brassicifolius. It may also feed on introduced Eucalyptus and Abutilon during autumn and winter when most of the native plants are not flowering. It feeds by clinging to the flowers, and favors shaded blossoms well above the ground. Both sexes defend foraging territories, with males holding the more productive sites. In addition to nectar, the species feeds on small insects taken in flight or gleaned from leaves.

=== Breeding ===
The Juan Fernández firecrown's breeding season is from September to mid-November. The female constructs a small cup nest of woven fern fibers, other fibers, mosses, and spiderweb placed on the tip of a twig in cover, typically about 4 m (13 ft) above the ground. A 2011 study found more than 75% of the nests were in Myrceugenia fernandeziana trees. The clutch size is two eggs. The incubation period and time to fledging are not known.

=== Vocalization ===
The Juan Fernández firecrown's song is "a medley of high-pitched squeaky notes, dry gravelly trills and descending chatters."

== Status and conservation ==
The IUCN has assessed the Juan Fernández firecrown as Critically Endangered. The species inhabits only one small island. It has an estimated population of 1500 to 3500 mature birds or 3000 to 5200 total individuals and the number is believed to be decreasing. The destruction of native trees, which the species depends on for nest sites, is a major cause of the decline. Also contributing are the spread of exotic zarzamora blackberry (Rubus ulmifolius) and maqui wineberry (Aristotelia chilensis), predation by domestic and feral cats, and destruction by introduced rabbits and goats. It may also suffer from competition for food from the more numerous green-backed firecrown.

A conservation effort was begun in 2004 by a partnership of several organizations (The Hummingbird Society, American Bird Conservancy, and Juan Fernández Islands Conservancy, Oikonos - Ecosystem Knowledge) with the aim of preventing extinction of the species. Their efforts included planting native species, removing non-native plants, and reducing non-native predators and competitors. Island residents have been hired as project coordinators and workers.
