= List of endemic plants of the Juan Fernández Islands =

This is a list of endemic vascular plants of the Juan Fernández Islands of Chile. The islands are home to several dozen endemic species and subspecies of plants, including the endemic genera Centaurodendron, Cuminia, Juania, Lactoris, Megalachne, Nothomyrcia, Robinsonia, Thyrsopteris, and Yunquea.

Plants are listed alphabetically by plant family.

† indicates species believed to be extinct.

== Amaranthaceae ==
- Chenopodium crusoeanum Skottsb.
- Chenopodium nesodendron Skottsb. – Alejandro Selkirk Island
- Chenopodium sanctae-clarae Johow – Santa Clara Island

== Apiaceae ==
- Apium fernandezianum Johow
- Eryngium bupleuroides Hook. & Arn. – Robinson Crusoe Island
- Eryngium × fernandezianum Skottsb. (E. bupleuroides × E. inaccessum) – Robinson Crusoe Island
- Eryngium inaccessum Skottsb. – Robinson Crusoe Island
- †Eryngium sarcophyllum Hook. & Arn. – Alejandro Selkirk Island. Last recorded in 1919.

== Arecaceae ==
- Juania Drude
  - Juania australis (Mart.) Drude ex Hook.f. – Robinson Crusoe Island

== Aristolochiaceae ==
- Lactoris Phil.
  - Lactoris fernandeziana Phil. – Robinson Crusoe Island

== Aspleniaceae ==
- Asplenium macrosorum Bertero
- Asplenium stellatum Colla
- Blechnum cycadifolium (Colla) J.W.Sturm
- Blechnum fernandezianum (Looser) Prada & Rolleri
- Blechnum longicauda C.Chr.
- Blechnum schottii (Colla) C.Chr.

== Asteraceae ==
- Centaurodendron Johow
  - Centaurodendron dracaenoides Johow – Robinson Crusoe Island
  - Centaurodendron palmiforme Skottsb. – Robinson Crusoe Island
  - Centaurodendron schilleri Penneck. – Alejandro Selkirk Island
- Erigeron fernandezianus (Colla) Solbrig
- Erigeron ingae Skottsb.
- Erigeron luteoviridis Skottsb.
- Erigeron rupicola Phil.
- Erigeron stuessyi Valdeb. – Alejandro Selkirk Island
- Robinsonia DC.
  - Robinsonia berteroi (DC.) R.W.Sanders
  - Robinsonia evenia Phil.
  - Robinsonia gayana Decne.
  - Robinsonia gracilis Decne.
  - †Robinsonia macrocephala Decne. – Robinson Crusoe Island
  - Robinsonia masafuerae Skottsb.
  - Robinsonia saxatilis Danton
  - Robinsonia thurifera Decne.
- Sonchus berteroanus (Decne.) S.C.Kim & Mejías
- Sonchus brassicifolius S.C.Kim & Mejías
- Sonchus lobatiflorus S.C.Kim & Mejías
- Sonchus marginatus (Bertero ex Decne.) S.C.Kim & Mejías
- Sonchus micranthus (Bertero ex Decne.) S.C.Kim & Mejías
- Sonchus neriifolius (Decne.) S.C.Kim & Mejías
- Sonchus phoeniciformis S.C.Kim & Mejías
- Sonchus pruinatus (Johow) S.C.Kim & Mejías
- Sonchus regius (Skottsb.) S.C.Kim & Mejías
- Sonchus sinuatus S.C.Kim & Mejías
- Sonchus splendens S.C.Kim & Mejías
- Yunquea Skottsb.
  - Yunquea tenzii Skottsb. – Robinson Crusoe Island

== Berberidaceae ==
- Berberis corymbosa Hook. & Arn.
- Berberis masafuerana Skottsb. – Alejandro Selkirk Island

== Boraginaceae ==
- Selkirkia berteroi (Colla) Hemsl. – Robinson Crusoe Island

== Brassicaceae ==
- Cardamine kruesselii Johow ex Reiche

== Bromeliaceae ==
- Greigia berteroi Skottsb.
- Ochagavia elegans Phil.

== Campanulaceae ==
- Wahlenbergia berteroi Hook. & Arn.
- Wahlenbergia fernandeziana A.DC.
- Wahlenbergia grahamiae Hemsl.
- Wahlenbergia masafuerae (Phil.) Skottsb.
- Wahlenbergia tuberosa Hook.f.

== Caryophyllaceae ==
- Spergularia masafuerana Skottsb.

== Cyatheaceae ==
- Dicksonia berteroana (Colla) Hook. – Robinson Crusoe Island
- Dicksonia externa Skottsb. – Alejandro Selkirk Island
- Thyrsopteris Kunze
  - Thyrsopteris elegans Kunze

== Cyperaceae ==
- Carex aspericaulis (G.A.Wheeler) J.R.Starr – Alejandro Selkirk Island
- Carex berteroniana Steud.
- Carex fernandesiana (Nees ex Boeckeler) J.R.Starr
- Carex fernandezensis Mack. ex G.A.Wheeler – Robinson Crusoe Island
- Carex firmula subsp. firmula – Alejandro Selkirk Island
- Carex macloviformis (G.A.Wheeler) J.R.Starr – Alejandro Selkirk Island
- Carex plurinervata J.R.Starr – Alejandro Selkirk Island
- Carex stuessyi G.A.Wheeler – Alejandro Selkirk Island
- Machaerina scirpoidea (Steud.) T.Koyama – Robinson Crusoe Island

== Ericaceae ==
- Gaultheria racemulosa (DC.) D.J.Middleton

== Escalloniaceae ==
- Escallonia callcottiae Hook. & Arn.

== Euphorbiaceae ==
- Dysopsis hirsuta (Müll.Arg.) Skottsb.

== Fabaceae ==
- Sophora fernandeziana (Phil.) Skottsb. – Robinson Crusoe Island
- Sophora masafuerana (Phil.) Skottsb.
- Sophora reedeana (Phil.) Yakovlev – Robinson Crusoe Island

== Gleicheniaceae ==
- Sticherus lepidotus (R.A.Rodr.) R.A.Rodr. & Ponce

== Gunneraceae ==
- Gunnera bracteata Steud. ex Benn. – Robinson Crusoe Island
- Gunnera masafuerae Skottsb. – Alejandro Selkirk Island
- Gunnera peltata Phil. – Robinson Crusoe Island

== Haloragaceae ==
- Haloragis masafuerana Skottsb.
  - Haloragis masafuerana var. asperrima (Skottsb.) Orchard
  - Haloragis masafuerana var. masafuerana
- Haloragis masatierrana Skottsb.
  - Haloragis masatierrana var. applanata Danton – Robinson Crusoe Island
  - Haloragis masatierrana var. masatierrana
  - Haloragis masatierrana var. scabrida Danton & C.Perrier

== Hymenophyllaceae ==
- Hymenophyllum ferrugineum Colla
- Hymenophyllum parvulum C.Chr.
- Hymenophyllum rugosum C.Chr.
- Trichomanes ingae C.Chr. – Robinson Crusoe Island
- Trichomanes philippianum J.W.Sturm

== Juncaceae ==
- Luzula masafuerana Skottsb.

== Lamiaceae ==
- Cuminia Colla
  - Cuminia eriantha (Benth.) Benth.
    - Cuminia eriantha var. eriantha – Robinson Crusoe Island
    - Cuminia eriantha var. fernandezia (Colla) Harley – Robinson Crusoe Island

== Myrtaceae ==
- Myrceugenia schulzei Johow – Alejandro Selkirk Island
- Nothomyrcia Kausel
  - Nothomyrcia fernandeziana (Hook. & Arn.) Kausel – Robinson Crusoe Island
- Ugni selkirkii (Hook. & Arn.) O.Berg – Robinson Crusoe Island

== Ophioglossaceae ==
- Ophioglossum fernandezianum C.Chr – Robinson Crusoe Island

== Orchidaceae ==
- Gavilea insularis M.N.Correa

== Orobanchaceae ==
- Euphrasia formosissima Skottsb.
  - Euphrasia formosissima subsp. cucharensis Danton & C.Perrier – Alejandro Selkirk Island
  - Euphrasia formosissima subsp. formosissima – Alejandro Selkirk Island

== Piperaceae ==
- Peperomia berteroana subsp. berteroana
- Peperomia fernandeziana Miq.
- Peperomia margaritifera Bertero ex Hook.
- Peperomia skottsbergii C.DC.

== Plantaginaceae ==
- Plantago fernandezia Bertero ex Barnéoud

== Poaceae ==
- Agrostis masafuerana Pilg.
- Festuca dolichathera Röser & Tkach – Alejandro Selkirk Island
- Festuca masafuerana (Skottsb. & Pilg.) Röser & Tkach – Alejandro Selkirk Island
- †Festuca masatierrae Röser & Tkach – Robinson Crusoe Island. Last recorded in 1854.
- Festuca robinsoniana (C.M.Peña) Röser & Tkach
- Megalachne Steud.
  - Megalachne berteroniana Steud.

== Polypodiaceae ==
- Arthropteris altescandens (Colla) J.Sm.
- Megalastrum glabrius (C.Chr. & Skottsb.) Sundue, Rouhan & R.C.Moran
- Megalastrum inaequalifolium (Colla) A.R.Sm. & R.C.Moran
- Megalastrum masafuerae Sundue, Rouhan & R.C.Moran
- Pleopeltis × cerro-altoensis Danton & Boudrie (P. macrocarpa × P. masafuerae)
- Polystichum tetragonum Fée
- Rumohra berteroana (Colla) R.Rodr.
- Synammia intermedia (Colla) G.Kunkel

== Pteridaceae ==
- Hemionitis chilensis (Fée & J.Rémy) Christenh.
- Hemionitis hookeri (E.J.Lowe) Christenh.

== Ranunculaceae ==
- Ranunculus caprarum Skottsb.

== Rhamnaceae ==
- Colletia spartioides Bertero ex Colla – Robinson Crusoe Island

== Rosaceae ==
- Acaena masafuerana Bitter
- × Margyracaena Bitter (Acaena x Margyricarpus)
  - × Margyracaena skottsbergii Bitter (Acaena argentea x Margyricarpus digynus)
- Margyricarpus digynus (Bitter) Skottsb.

== Rubiaceae ==
- Coprosma oliveri Fosberg – Robinson Crusoe Island
- Coprosma pyrifolia (Hook. & Arn.) Skottsb.
- Galium masafueranum Skottsb. – Alejandro Selkirk Island

== Rutaceae ==
- Fagara externa Skottsb. (unplaced)
- Zanthoxylum mayu Bertero – Robinson Crusoe Island

== Salicaceae ==
- Azara serrata var. fernandeziana (Gay) Reiche

== Santalaceae ==
- †Santalum fernandezianum Phil. – last recorded in 1908

== Solanaceae ==
- Nicotiana cordifolia Phil.
  - Nicotiana cordifolia subsp. cordifolia
  - Nicotiana cordifolia subsp. sanctaclarae Danton
- Solanum fernandezianum Phil.

== Urticaceae ==
- Boehmeria excelsa (Steud.) Wedd.
- Urtica glomeruliflora Steud.
- Urtica masafuerae Phil.

== Verbenaceae ==
- Rhaphithamnus venustus (Phil.) B.L.Rob.

== Winteraceae ==
- Drimys confertifolia Phil.
