= San Félix–San Ambrosio Islands temperate forests =

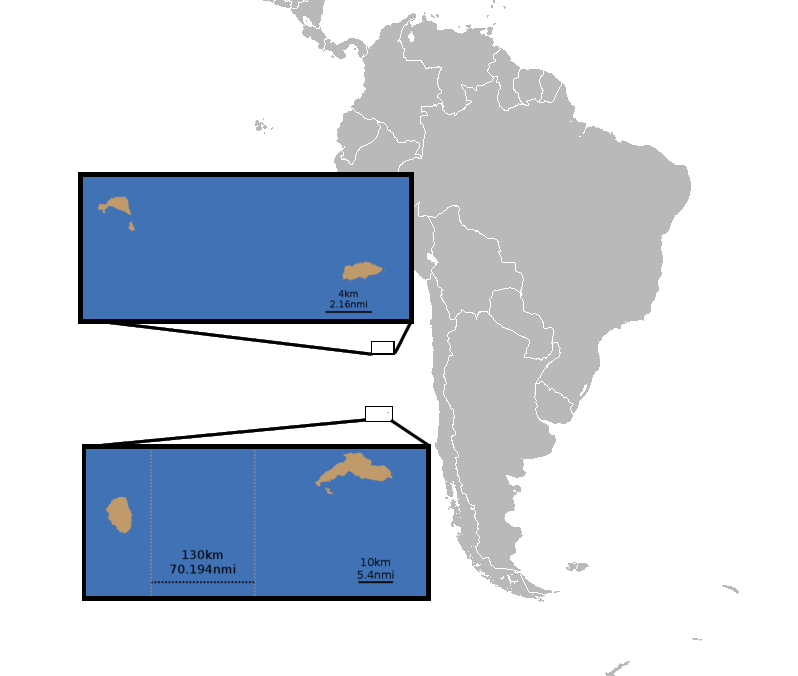
- Desventuradas Islands, in relation to South America and the Juan Fernández Islands

Ecology
- Realm: Neotropical
- Biome: temperate broadleaf and mixed forests

Geography
- Area: 3.9 km^{2} (1.5 mi^{2})
- Country: Chile
- Region: Valparaíso
- Elevation: 0 to 479 metres (0 to 1,572 ft)
- Coordinates: 26°18′30″S 80°01′30″W
- Oceans or seas: Pacific Ocean
- Climate type: Cfb (moist, warm, oceanic)

Conservation
- Conservation status: Critical/endangered

The San Félix–San Ambrosio Islands temperate forests are a biome located on the small oceanic archipelago known as the Desventuradas Islands The islands form part of the ocean territory of Chile, and are located 850 km from the coast of Chile, and about 750 km north of the Juan Fernández Islands. Due to their remote nature and difficult conditions, they have not been the subject of great study. The islands themselves are 20 km apart, and are likely volcanic in origin.

== Climate ==
Only San Félix's climatic characteristics are known - the climate is Mediterranean, warm, moist, and oceanic. Temperatures range from 14.3 °C - 22.5 °C, with an average of 17.8 °C. Annual rainfall is 94.8 mm, occurring mainly in winter (May-August). San Ambrosio is more favorable for the retention of fog, resulting in microclimates that are more amenable to vegetation. There are no permanent sources of freshwater on the islands, and it is likely that there are only temporary waterways which only exist during precipitation.

== Flora ==
Due to the aforementioned remoteness, vegetation is not well characterized; only descriptive works from sporadic visits are available. The arid conditions on San Félix are reflected in its low scrubland, where coverage is no more than 25% and is predominantly 20-30 cm high bushes with cushions. Plant cover is generally better on San Ambrosio, and in areas that benefit from fog moisture, some specimens of Sonchus laceratus (syn. Thamnoseris lacerata) have been observed to grow as high as 5m.

Plants endemic to the archipelago include the monotypic genus Nesocaryum and the species Atriplex chapinii, Atriplex imbricata var. foliolosa, Chenopodium sancti-ambrosii, Cristaria insularis, Eragrostis kuschelii, Frankenia vidalii, Fuertesimalva sanambrosiana, Parietaria feliciana, Perityle tenuifolius, Plantago lundborgii, Sicyos baderoa var. ambrosianus, Sonchus laceratus, and Spergularia manicata.
