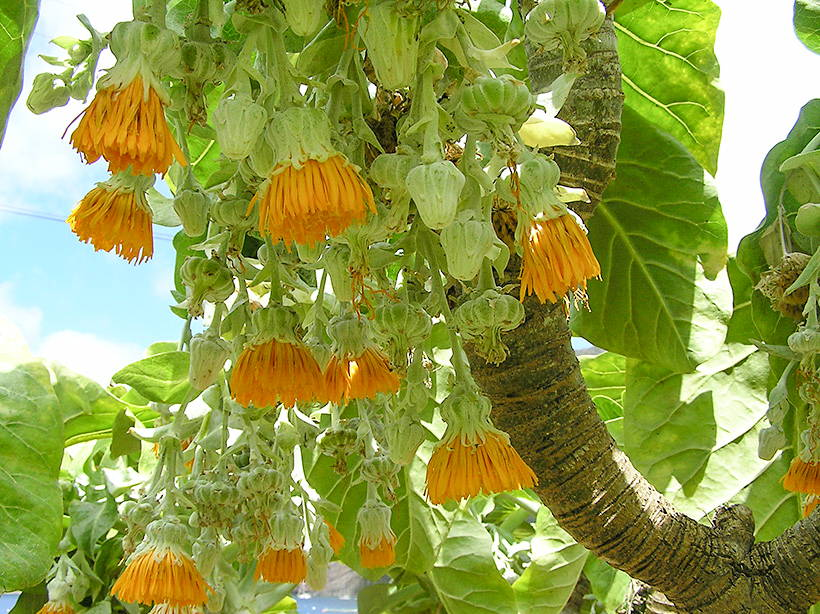
- Sonchus brassicifolius

Scientific classification
- Kingdom: Plantae
- Clade: Tracheophytes
- Clade: Angiosperms
- Clade: Eudicots
- Clade: Asterids
- Order: Asterales
- Family: Asteraceae
- Genus: Sonchus
- Subgenus: Sonchus subg. Dendroseris (D.Don) S.C.Kim & Mejías

Synonyms
- Dendroseris D.Don; Dendroseris subg. Eudendroseris Skottsb., nom. inval.; Dendroseris subg. Phoenicoseris Skottsb.; Dendroseris subg. Rea (Bertero ex Decne.) Skottsb.; Dendroseris subg. Schizoglossum (Skottsb.) Carlquist; Hesperoseris Skottsb.; Phoenicoseris (Skottsb.) Skottsb; Rea Bertero ex Decne.; Thamnoseris F. Phil.

= Sonchus subg. Dendroseris =

Historically recognized genus of flowering plants

Sonchus subg. Dendroseris is a subgenus of flowering plants in the genus Sonchus, family Asteraceae. It was formerly treated as the genus Dendroseris, with one species sometimes placed in Thamnoseris. All the species placed in the subgenus are endemic to either the Juan Fernández Islands or the Desventuradas Islands in the South Pacific, both part of Chile.

== Description ==
Species of Sonchus subg. Dendroseris have an unusual growth habit for members of the genus. They are shrubs or trees, some up to 7 m (23 ft) high. The shrubby species are succulent, the tree-like species are either unbranched or weakly branched. They have large leaves, either entire or lobed (pinnatifid), arranged in rosettes. The base of the flower head (the receptacle) does not have scales. The flowers are white to orange in colour. The achenes are usually flattened and irregularly shaped. The pappus is made up of relatively few, stiff and non-feathered hairs. The species are tetraploids, with the base chromosome number x=9.

== Taxonomy ==
The genus Dendroseris was first established by David Don in 1832 with the species D. macrophylla. Further species from the Juan Fernández Islands were later added to the group, sometimes being placed in other genera (Rea, Phoenicoseris, and Hesperoseris). Federico Philippi created the monotypic genus Thamnoseris for a species endemic to the Desventuradas Islands, Th. lacerata. Molecular phylogenetic studies from 1996 onwards showed that Dendroseris was deeply embedded within the genus Sonchus with Thamnoseris as its sister. Accordingly, all species were transferred to Sonchus, and placed in subgenus Dendroseris.

=== Species ===
All the species formerly placed in the genera Dendroseris and Thamnoseris have been transferred to Sonchus subg. Dendroseris:

- Sonchus berteroanus (Decne.) S.C.Kim & Mejías, syn. Dendroseris berteroana
- Sonchus brassicifolius S.C.Kim & Mejías, syn. Dendroseris litoralis
- Sonchus laceratus (Phil.) S.C.Kim & Mejías, syns. Thamnoseris lacerata, Dendroseris lacerata
- Sonchus lobatiflorus S.C.Kim & Mejías, syn. Dendroseris gigantea
- Sonchus marginatus (Bertero ex Decne.) S.C.Kim & Mejías, syn. Dendroseris marginata
- Sonchus micranthus (Bertero ex Decne.) S.C.Kim & Mejías, syn. Dendroseris micrantha
- Sonchus neriifolius (Decne.) S.C.Kim & Mejías, syn. Dendroseris neriifolia
- Sonchus phoeniciformis S.C.Kim & Mejías, syn. Dendroseris pinnata
- Sonchus pruinatus (Johow) S.C.Kim & Mejías, syn. Dendroseris pruinata
- Sonchus regius (Skottsb.) S.C.Kim & Mejías, syn. Dendroseris regia
- Sonchus sinuatus S.C.Kim & Mejías, syn. Dendroseris macrantha
- Sonchus splendens S.C.Kim & Mejías, syn. Dendroseris macrophylla
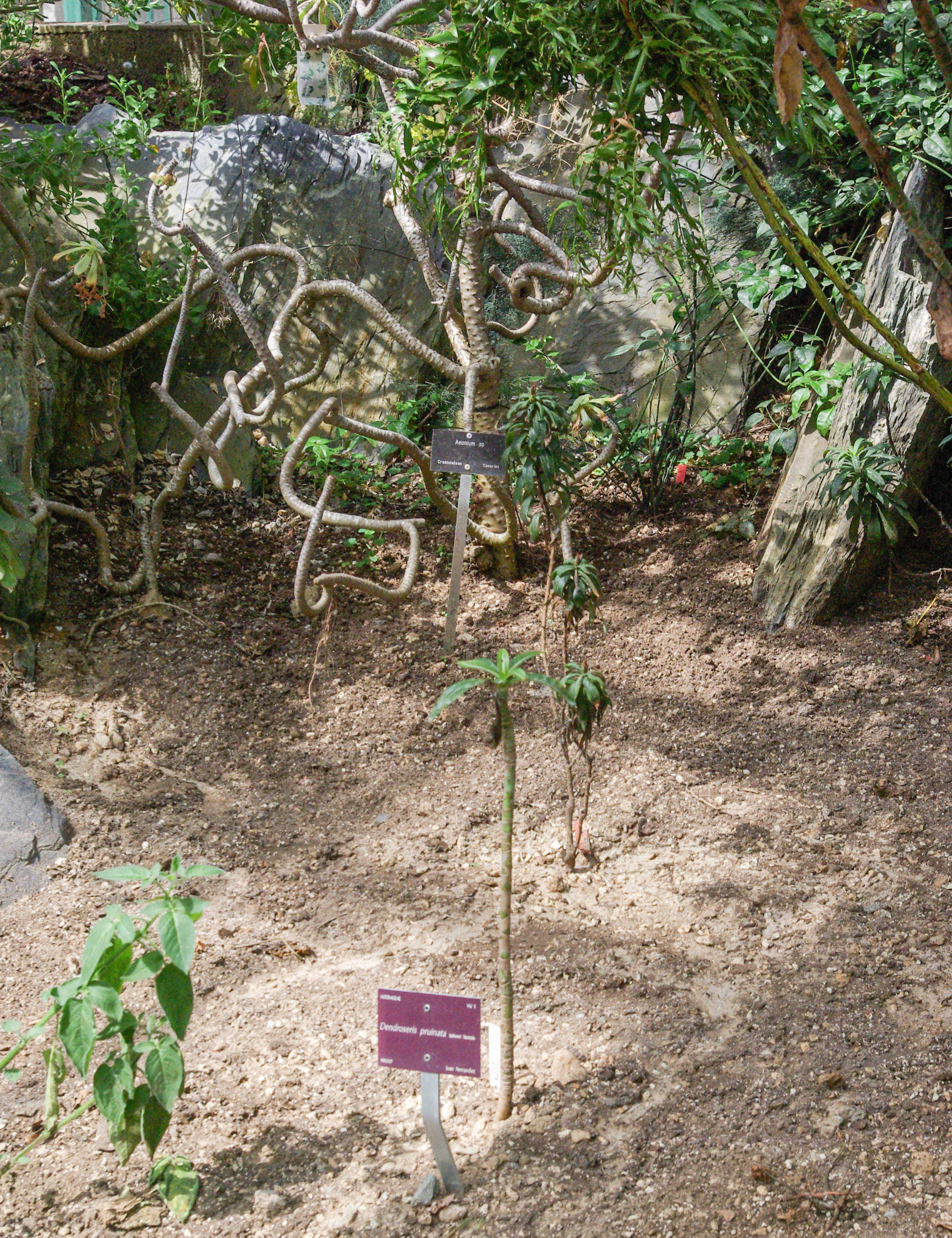
Sonchus pruinatus in cultivation

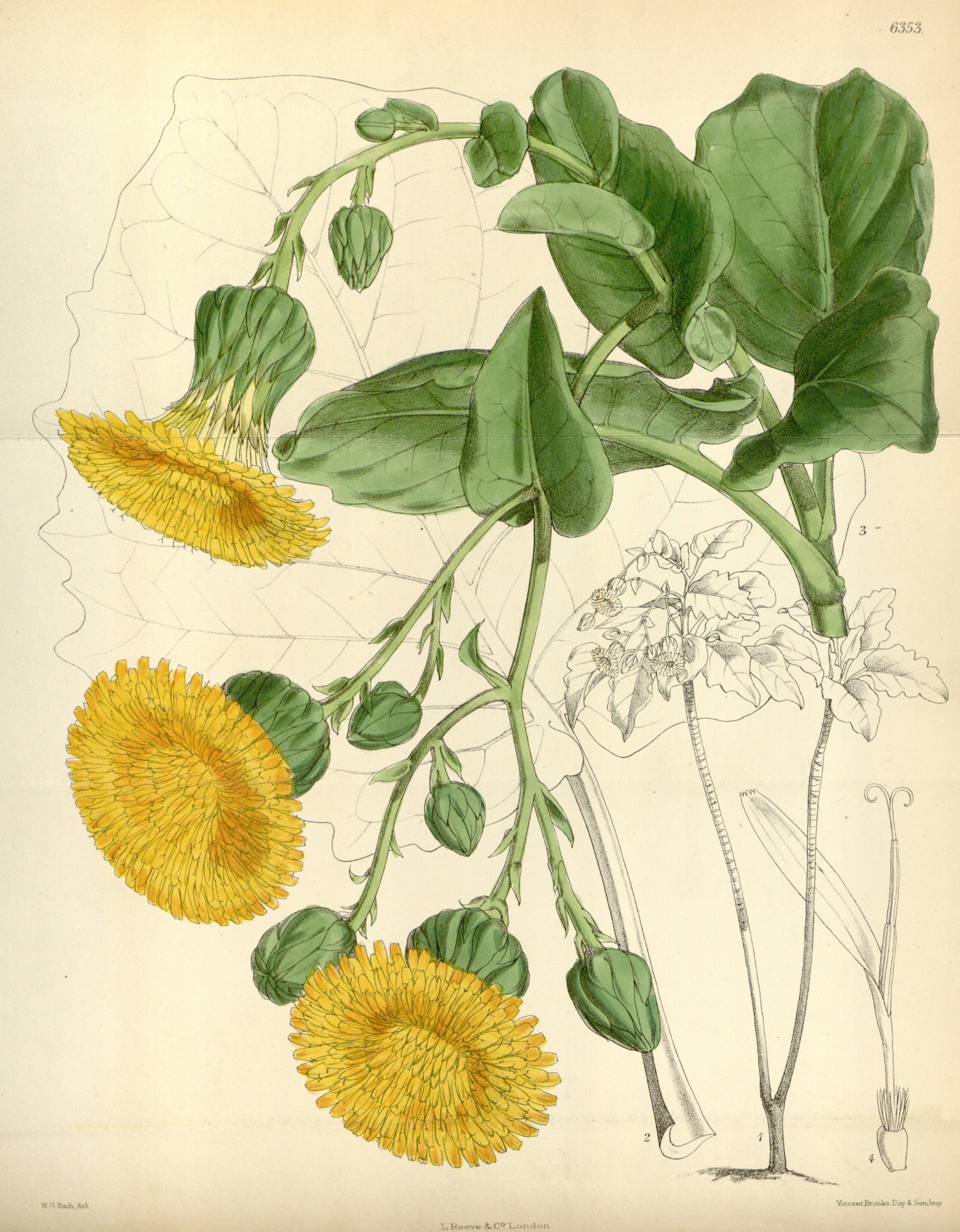
Sonchus splendens

== Distribution ==
All species are endemic to the Juan Fernández Islands with the exception of Sonchus laceratus, which is endemic to the Desventuradas Islands.
