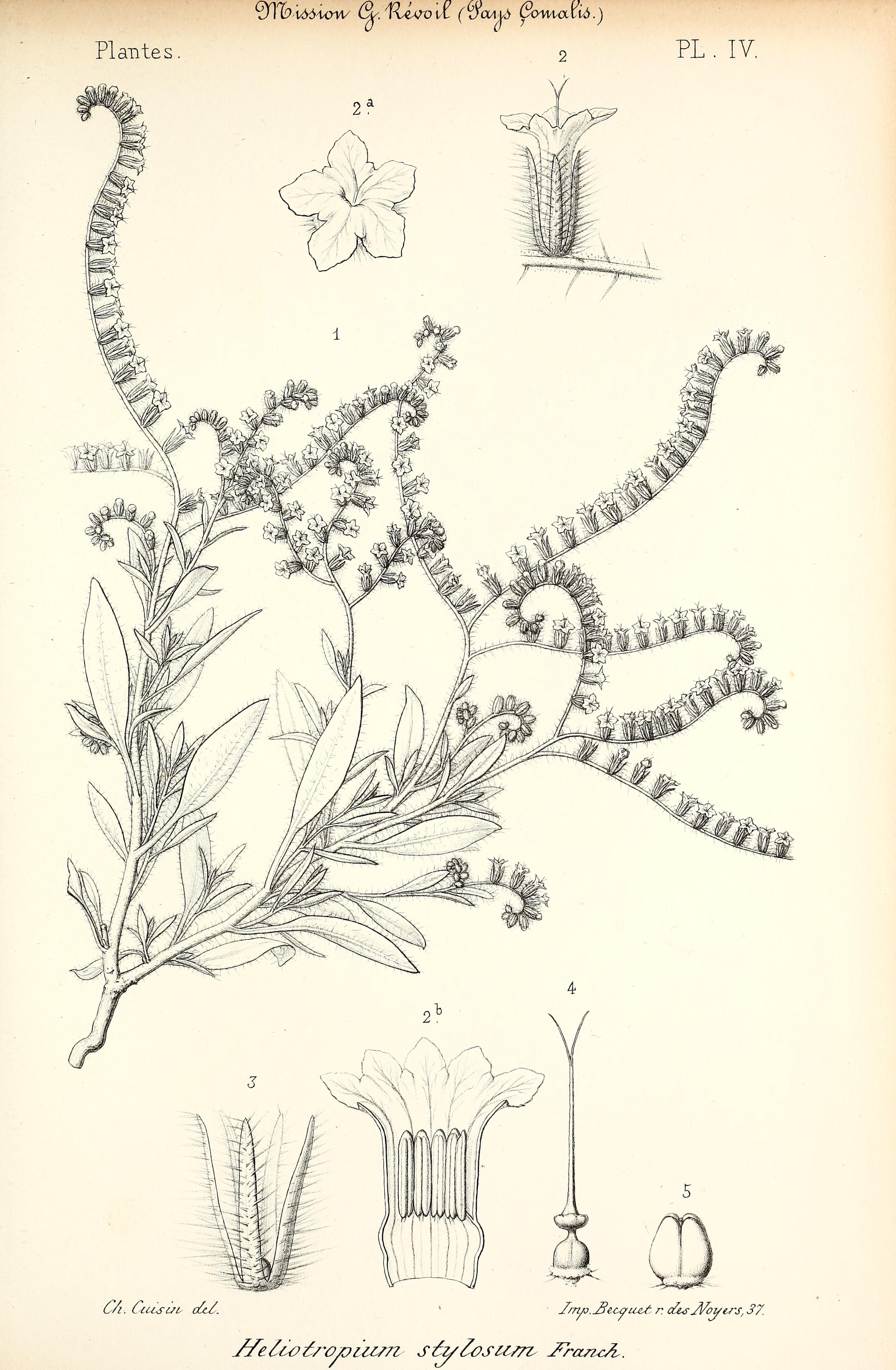

Scientific classification
- Kingdom: Plantae
- Clade: Tracheophytes
- Clade: Angiosperms
- Clade: Eudicots
- Clade: Asterids
- Order: Boraginales
- Family: Boraginaceae
- Genus: Nesocaryum; I.M.Johnst.
- Species: N. stylosum

Binomial name
- Nesocaryum stylosum (Phil.) I.M.Johnst.

= Nesocaryum =

Genus of plants

Nesocaryum is a monotypic genus of flowering plants belonging to the family Boraginaceae. The only species is Nesocaryum stylosum.

Its native range is the Desventuradas Islands, off the coast of Chile.
