= Isla San Felix Airport =

Airport on Isla San Felix, Chile

- IATA: none; ICAO: SCFX

Summary
- Airport type: Public/Military
- Serves: Isla San Felix, Chile
- Elevation AMSL: 165 ft / 50 m
- Coordinates: 26°17′38″S 80°05′45″W

Map
- Location of Isla San Felix Airport in Chile

Runways
Direction	Length		Surface
Direction	m	ft	Surface
11/29	2,010	6,594	Asphalt
- Source: Landings.com Google Maps GCM

Isla San Felix Airport Spanish: Aeropuerto Isla San Felix, (ICAO: SCFX) is an airport serving the Chilean Navy garrison on Isla San Felix, a Pacific island that is part of the Valparaíso Region of Chile. The island is some 900 kilometres (560 mi) off the coast of Chile, and 1,100 kilometres (680 mi) northwest of Valparaíso.

The runway goes the entire length of the small island, so all approaches and departures are over the ocean. There are no published radio navaids on the island.

== See also ==
- Transport in Chile
- List of airports in Chile
