= Federico Johow =

German-Chilean botanist and biologist

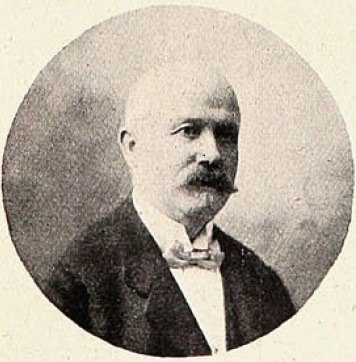
Dr. phil. Federico Johow

Federico Johow, born as Friedrich Richard Adalbert Johow; (February 5, 1859–April 30, 1933) was a German-Chilean botanist and biologist born in Chodziesen (known as Colmar after 1878), Province of Posen.

== Life ==
Friedrich began his higher education at the University of Berlin, and afterwards studied zoology and botany at the University of Bonn, where he obtained his doctorate in 1880. In 1882 he took part on a study trip to Venezuela and the Lesser Antilles, financed by the Royal Academy of Sciences in Berlin. In 1888 he was an appointed associate professor of natural sciences at the University of Bonn.

=== Chile ===
In 1889, he was invited by José Manuel Balmaceda to Santiago, where he became a professor at the Instituto Pedagógico de Chile (together with the Germans Alfred Beutell, Friedrich Hanssen, Hans Steffen, Rudolf Lenz, Reinhold von Lilienthal, and Jürgen Heinrich Schneider). Here he remained for the next 36 years, retiring in 1925. Johow led a series of scientific journeys to the Juan Fernandez Archipelago, and in 1896 was author of a book on the flora of the islands titled Estudios sobre la flora de las Islas de Juan Fernández. He died on April 30, 1933, in Valparaíso.

He is the taxonomic authority of the plant genus Centaurodendron. In 1937 the genus Johowia (family Lamiaceae) was named in his honor by Carl Epling and Gualterio Looser. A synonym for this taxa is Cuminia.

== Familie ==
Friedrich was the son of Carl Hermann Adalbert Johow and his wife Marie Luise, née Biehler. He had five siblings, his brother Georg Reinhold Franz Julius Johow (1862–1945) was Generalmajor of the German Army (German Empire) and Generalleutnant of the Wehrmacht (Tannenberg-General). Dr. phil. Johow was married to Magdalena, née Schäfer. They had three children: Margarita, Dolly, and Ernst Arnulf (1893–1965)
