= Eragrostis kuschelii =

Scientific classification
- Kingdom: Plantae
- Clade: Tracheophytes
- Clade: Angiosperms
- Clade: Monocots
- Clade: Commelinids
- Order: Poales
- Family: Poaceae
- Subfamily: Chloridoideae
- Genus: Eragrostis
- Species: E. kuschelii

Binomial name
- Eragrostis kuschelii Skottsb.

Species of grass

Eragrostis kuschelii is a species of flowering plant in the family Poaceae, endemic to the Desventuradas Islands (San Ambrosio island). It was first described by Carl Skottsberg in 1963.
