= Sonchus lobatiflorus =

Conservation status
- Extinct in the Wild (IUCN 3.1)

Scientific classification
- Kingdom: Plantae
- Clade: Tracheophytes
- Clade: Angiosperms
- Clade: Eudicots
- Clade: Asterids
- Order: Asterales
- Family: Asteraceae
- Genus: Sonchus
- Subgenus: Sonchus subg. Dendroseris
- Species: S. lobatiflorus

Binomial name
- Sonchus lobatiflorus S.C.Kim & Mejías
- It was native to Alejandro Selkirk Island of the Juan Fernández Archipelago, Chile but is now extinct in the wild.

Synonyms
- Dendroseris gigantea Johow; Hesperoseris gigantea (Johow) Skottsb.

Species of flowering plant

Sonchus lobatiflorus, synonym Dendroseris gigantea, is a species of flowering plant in the family Asteraceae. It was endemic to the Juan Fernández Islands, but is now extinct in the wild. It is being artificially planted on Robinson Crusoe Island.

== Taxonomy ==
The species was first described in 1896 by Federico Johow as Dendroseris gigantea. The genus Dendroseris was considered endemic to the Juan Fernández Islands. In 2012, based on molecular phylogenetic evidence, it was shown that Dendroseris was embedded within the genus Sonchus, and all its species were transferred to that genus. As the combination Sonchus giganteus had already been used for a different species, the replacement name Sonchus lobatiflorus was published.

== Conservation ==
Sonchus lobatiflorus is now extinct in the wild, after it had previously been classified as critically endangered. It is being artificially planted on Robinson Crusoe Island.
