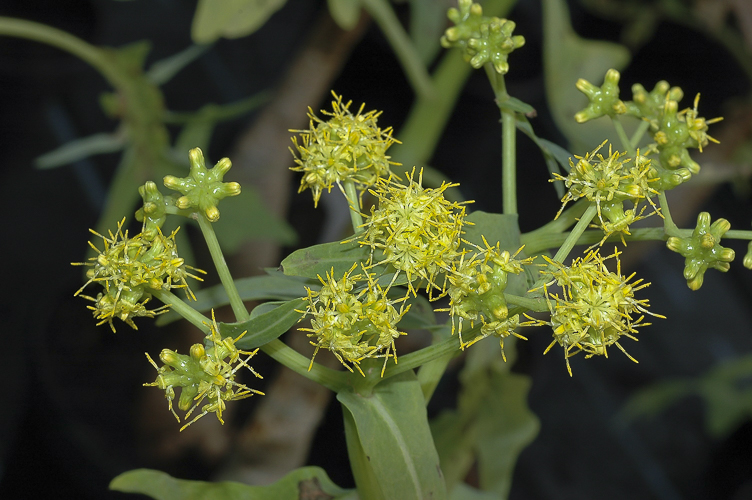

Scientific classification
- Kingdom: Plantae
- Clade: Tracheophytes
- Clade: Angiosperms
- Clade: Eudicots
- Clade: Asterids
- Order: Asterales
- Family: Asteraceae
- Genus: Sonchus
- Subgenus: Sonchus subg. Dendroseris
- Species: S. laceratus

Binomial name
- Sonchus laceratus (Phil.) S.C.Kim & Mejías

Synonyms
- Dendroseris lacerata (Phil.) Hemsl.; Rea lacerata Phil.; Thamnoseris lacerata (Phil.) F.Phil.; Thamnoseris lobata I.M.Johnst.

= Sonchus laceratus =

Species of plant

Sonchus laceratus, synonyms including Dendroseris lacerata and Thamnoseris lacerata, is a species of plants in the daisy family Asteraceae. It is endemic to the Desventuradas Islands in the South Pacific, part of Chile. It is commonly known as the pachycaul tree.

== Taxonomy ==
The species was first described in 1870 by Rodolfo Amando Philippi as Rea lacerata. In 1875, his son, Federico Philippi, transferred it to his new genus Thamnoseris as T. lacerata, where it was the sole species. In 1885, William Hemsley transferred it to the genus Dendroseris as D. lacerata. In 2012, based on molecular phylogenetic evidence, it was shown that Dendroseris was embedded within the genus Sonchus, and all its species were transferred to that genus, being placed in Sonchus subg. Dendroseris.
