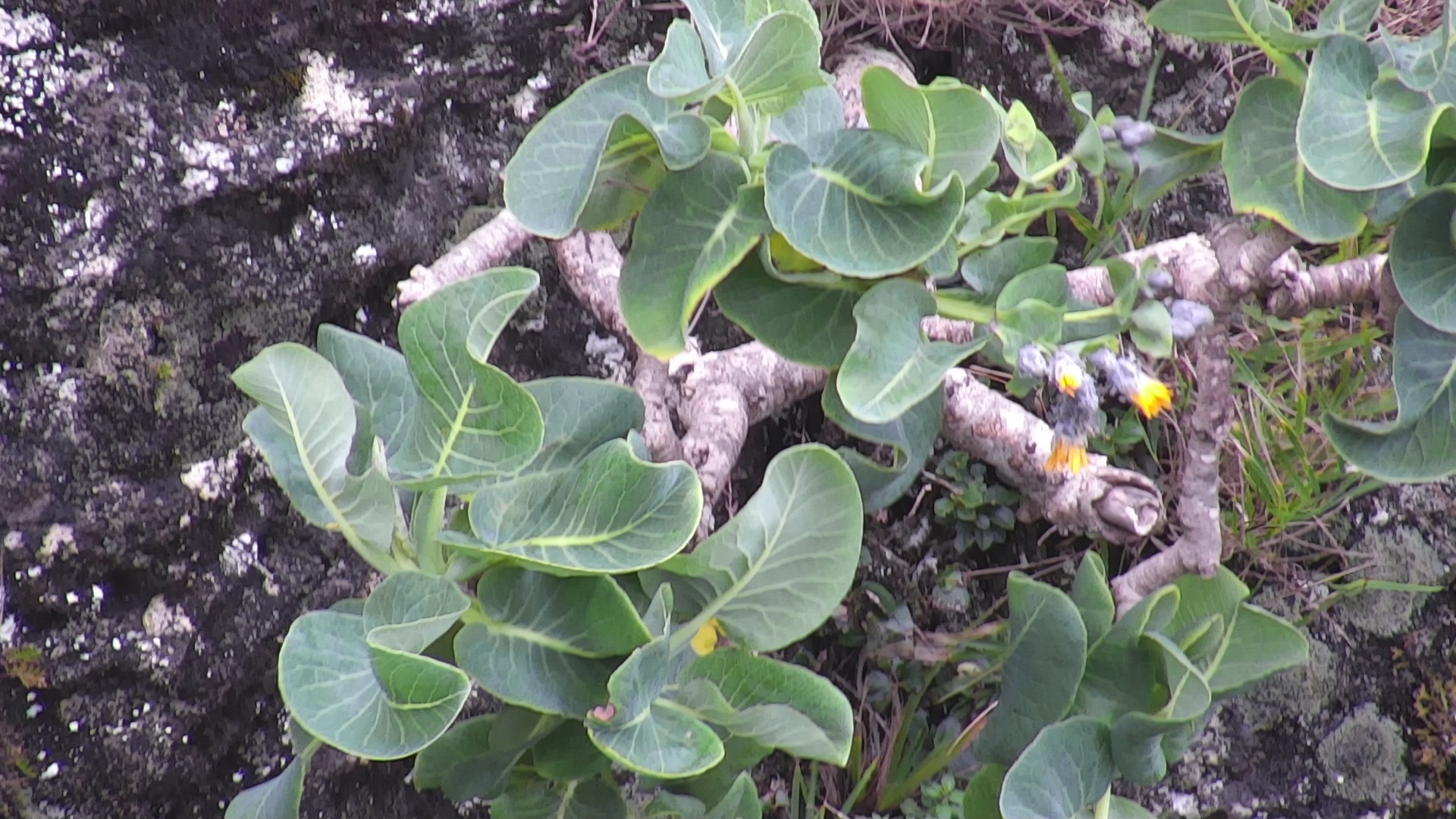
- On Robinson Crusoe Island, Chile

Conservation status
- Critically Endangered (IUCN 2.3)

Scientific classification
- Kingdom: Plantae
- Clade: Tracheophytes
- Clade: Angiosperms
- Clade: Eudicots
- Clade: Asterids
- Order: Asterales
- Family: Asteraceae
- Genus: Sonchus
- Subgenus: Sonchus subg. Dendroseris
- Species: S. marginatus

Binomial name
- Sonchus marginatus (Bert. ex Decne.) S.C.Kim & Mejías

Synonyms
- Rea marginata Bertero ex Decne.; Dendroseris marginata (Bertero ex Decne.) Hook. & Arn.

= Sonchus marginatus =

Species of flowering plant

Sonchus marginatus, synonym Dendroseris marginata, is a species of flowering plant in the family Asteraceae. It is endemic to the Juan Fernández Islands of Chile. It is threatened by habitat loss.
