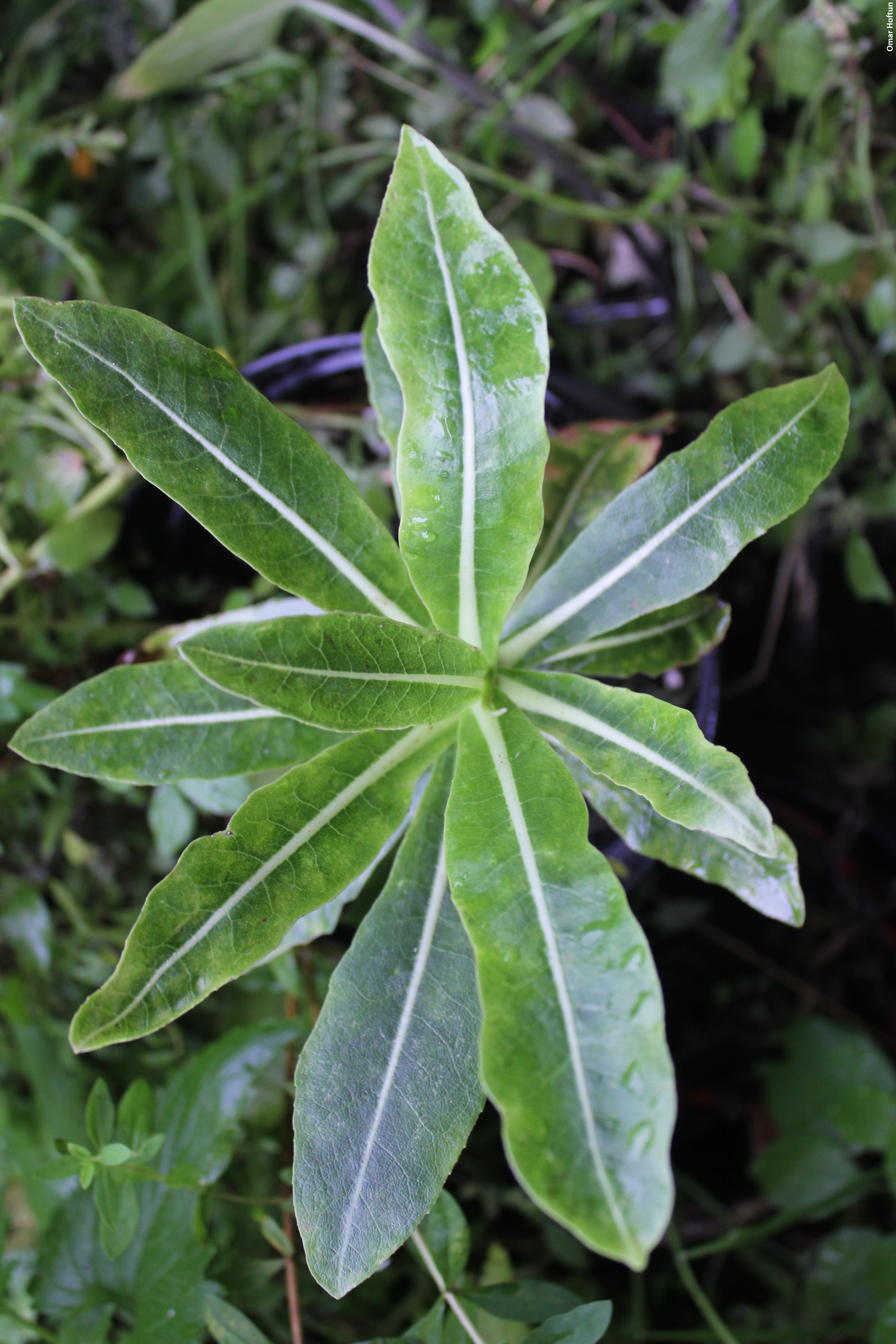

Conservation status
- Critically Endangered (IUCN 2.3)

Scientific classification
- Kingdom: Plantae
- Clade: Tracheophytes
- Clade: Angiosperms
- Clade: Eudicots
- Clade: Asterids
- Order: Asterales
- Family: Asteraceae
- Genus: Sonchus
- Subgenus: Sonchus subg. Dendroseris
- Species: S. micranthus

Binomial name
- Sonchus micranthus (Bertero ex Decne.) S.C.Kim & Mejías

Synonyms
- Dendroseris micrantha Hook. & Arn.; Rea longifolia Phil. ex Reiche; Rea micrantha Bertero ex Decne.; Rea mollis Bertero ex Decne.

= Sonchus micranthus =

Species of flowering plant

Sonchus micranthus, synonym Dendroseris micrantha, is a species of flowering plant in the family Asteraceae. It is endemic to the Juan Fernández Islands of Chile. It is threatened by habitat loss.
