= Sonchus sinuatus =

Conservation status
- Critically Endangered (IUCN 2.3)

Scientific classification
- Kingdom: Plantae
- Clade: Tracheophytes
- Clade: Angiosperms
- Clade: Eudicots
- Clade: Asterids
- Order: Asterales
- Family: Asteraceae
- Genus: Sonchus
- Subgenus: Sonchus subg. Dendroseris
- Species: S. sinuatus

Binomial name
- Sonchus sinuatus S.C.Kim & Mejías

Synonyms
- Dendroseris macrantha Skottsb.; Rea macrantha Bertero ex Decne.

Species of flowering plant

Sonchus sinuatus, synonym Dendroseris macrantha, is a species of flowering plant in the family Asteraceae. It is endemic to the Juan Fernández Islands of Chile. It is threatened by habitat loss.

== Taxonomy ==
The species was first described in 1833 as Rea macrantha. In 1921, it was transferred to the genus Dendroseris. In 2012, based on molecular phylogenetic evidence, it was shown that Dendroseris was embedded within the genus Sonchus, and all its species were transferred to that genus and placed in Sonchus subg. Dendroseris. As the combination Sonchus macranthus had already been used for a different species, the replacement name Sonchus sinuatus was published.
