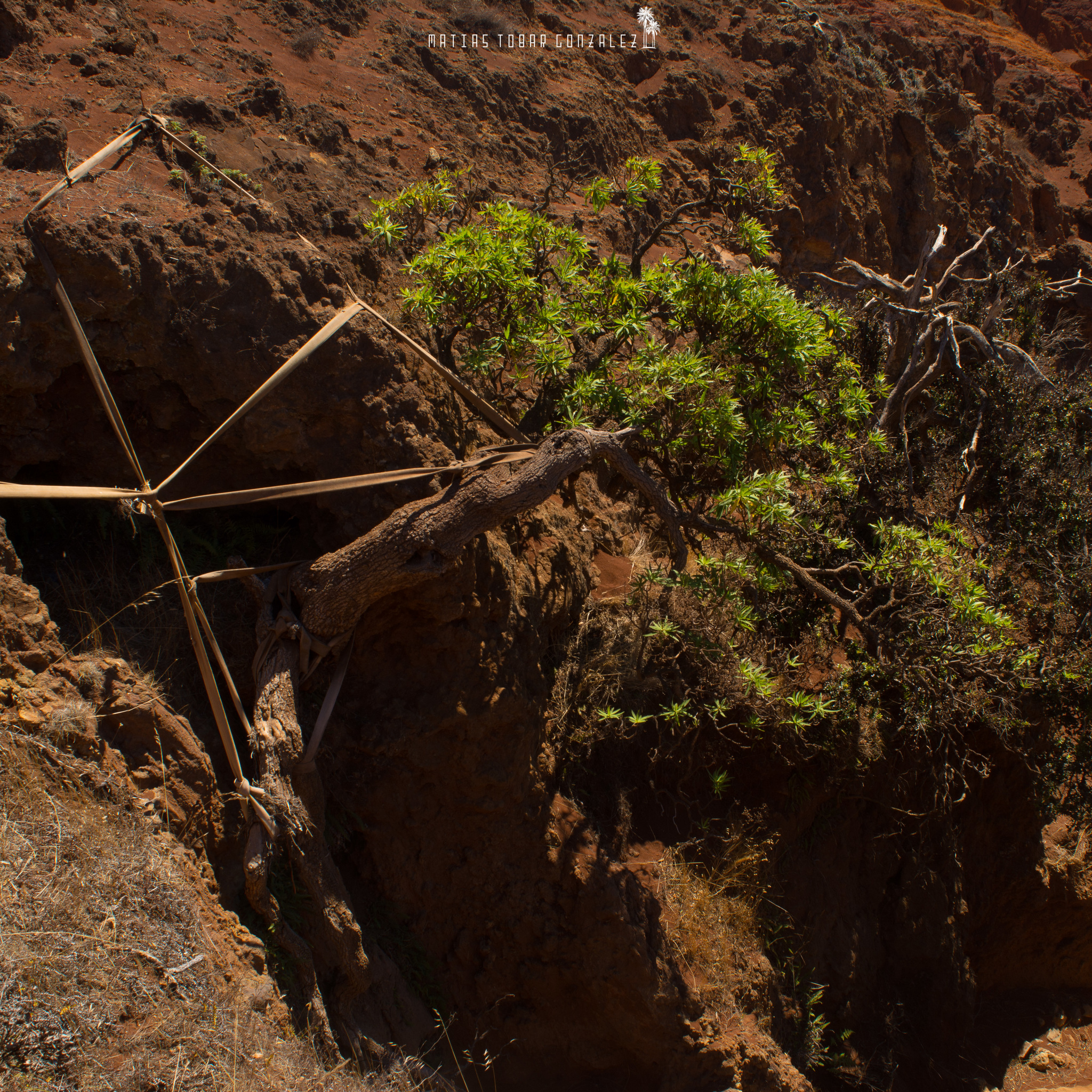

Conservation status
- Critically Endangered (IUCN 2.3)

Scientific classification
- Kingdom: Plantae
- Clade: Tracheophytes
- Clade: Angiosperms
- Clade: Eudicots
- Clade: Asterids
- Order: Asterales
- Family: Asteraceae
- Genus: Sonchus
- Subgenus: Sonchus subg. Dendroseris
- Species: S. neriifolius

Binomial name
- Sonchus neriifolius (Decne.) S.C.Kim & Mejías

Synonyms
- Dendroseris neriifolia Hook. & Arn.; Rea leucantha Bertero ex DC.; Rea neriifolia Decne.

= Sonchus neriifolius =

Species of flowering plant

Sonchus neriifolius, synonym Dendroseris neriifolia is a species of flowering plant in the family Asteraceae. It is a tree with droopy, elongated leaves and small yellow-white flowers. The plant was originally native to Continental Chile but is now endemic to Robinson Crusoe Island. The plant is endangered and very rare: only two specimens are known to exist in a ravine in the eastern part of the island, although there exist other human-cultivated specimens. It is classified as critically endangered by the World Conservation Monitoring Centre. In a collaboration between the Millennium Seed Bank (MSB) at Kew Wakehurst near Haywards Heath and the National Forest Corporation (CONAF) with Parque Nacional Archipiélago Juan Fernández (PNAJF) 29 seeds (out of a total of 400 collected in May 2026) were sent to Kew, of which eight are now germinating. Two were sent to Logan Botanic Garden in Scotland once they were big enough. 4 turned out to be not viable. The other 17 seeds will be put in long-term storage at the MSB at Kew.
