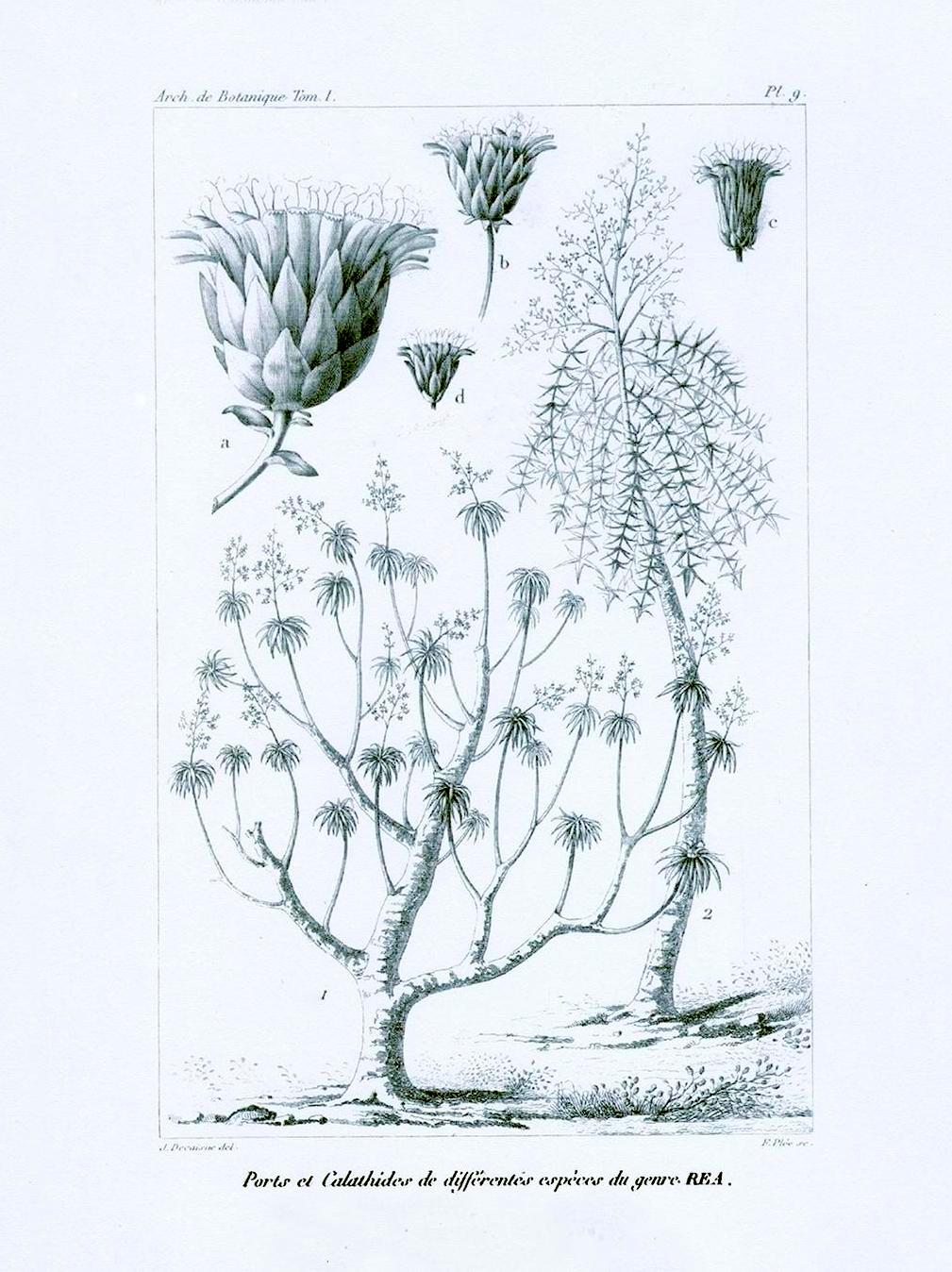
- Botanical illustration

Conservation status
- Critically Endangered (IUCN 2.3)

Scientific classification
- Kingdom: Plantae
- Clade: Tracheophytes
- Clade: Angiosperms
- Clade: Eudicots
- Clade: Asterids
- Order: Asterales
- Family: Asteraceae
- Genus: Sonchus
- Subgenus: Sonchus subg. Dendroseris
- Species: S. phoeniciformis

Binomial name
- Sonchus phoeniciformis S.C.Kim & Mejías

Synonyms
- Rea pinnata Bertero ex Decne.; Dendroseris pinnata Hook. & Arn.; Phoenicoseris pinnata (Bertero ex Decne.) Skottsb.

= Sonchus phoeniciformis =

Species of flowering plant

Sonchus phoeniciformis, synonym Dendroseris pinnata, is a species of flowering plant in the family Asteraceae. It is endemic to the Juan Fernández Islands of Chile. It is threatened by habitat loss.

== Taxonomy ==
The species was first described in 1833 as Rea pinnata. In 1835, it was transferred to Dendroseris pinnata. In 2012, based on molecular phylogenetic evidence, it was shown that Dendroseris was embedded within the genus Sonchus, and all its species were transferred to that genus, placed in Sonchus subg. Dendroseris. As the combination Sonchus pinnatus had already been used for a different species, the replacement name Sonchus phoeniciformis was published.
