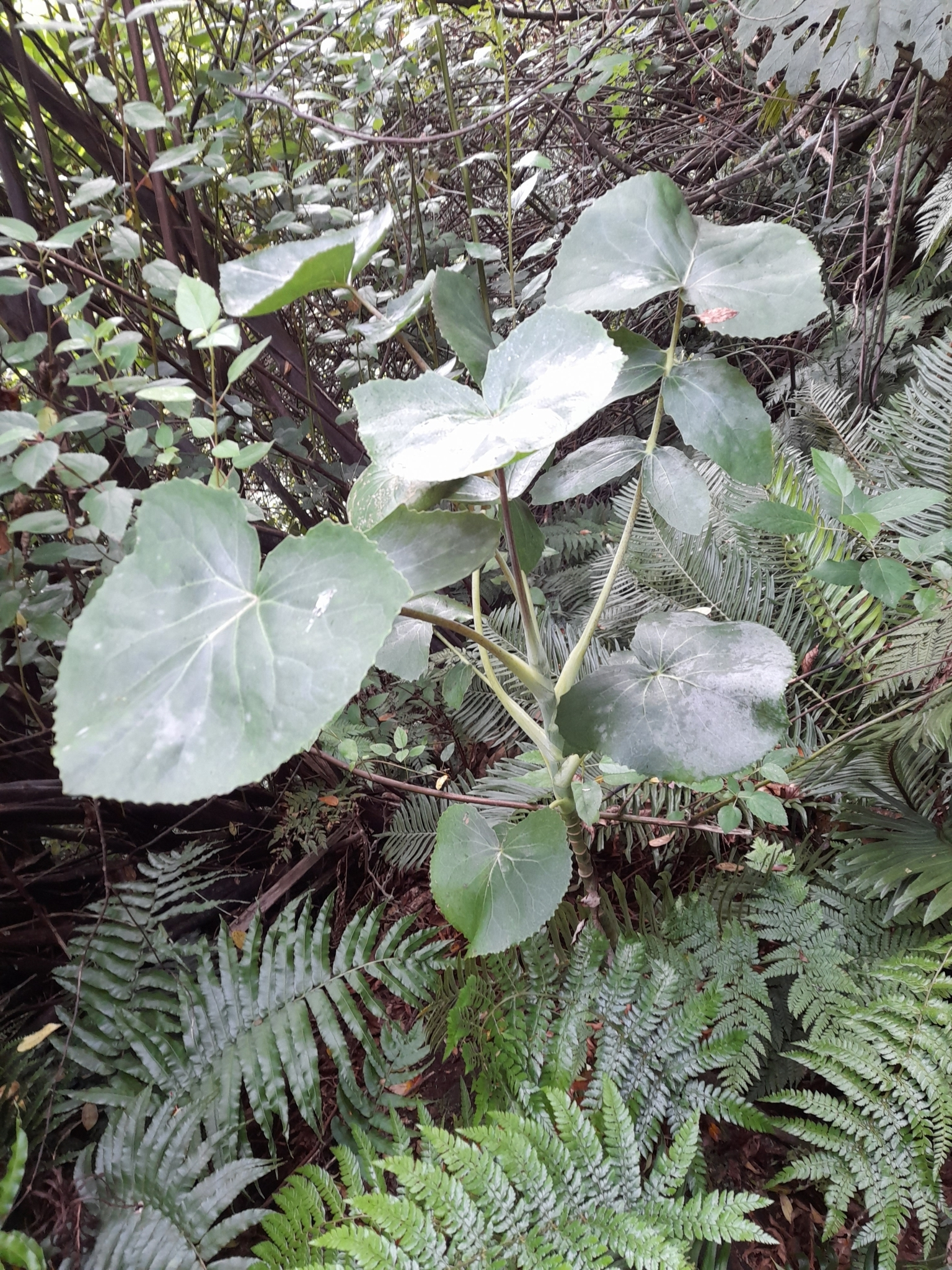

Conservation status
- Critically Endangered (IUCN 2.3)

Scientific classification
- Kingdom: Plantae
- Clade: Tracheophytes
- Clade: Angiosperms
- Clade: Eudicots
- Clade: Asterids
- Order: Asterales
- Family: Asteraceae
- Genus: Sonchus
- Subgenus: Sonchus subg. Dendroseris
- Species: S. berteroanus

Binomial name
- Sonchus berteroanus (Decne.) S.C.Kim & Mejías

Synonyms
- Dendroseris berteroana (Decne.) Hook. & Arn.; Dendroseris pinnata var. insignis Johow; Phoenicoseris berteroana (Decne.) Skottsb.; Rea berteroana Decne.; Rea pinnata var. insignis Bertero

= Sonchus berteroanus =

Species of flowering plant

Sonchus berteroanus, synonym Dendroseris berteroana, is a species of flowering plant in the family Asteraceae. It is found only in the Juan Fernández Islands of Chile. It is threatened by habitat loss.
