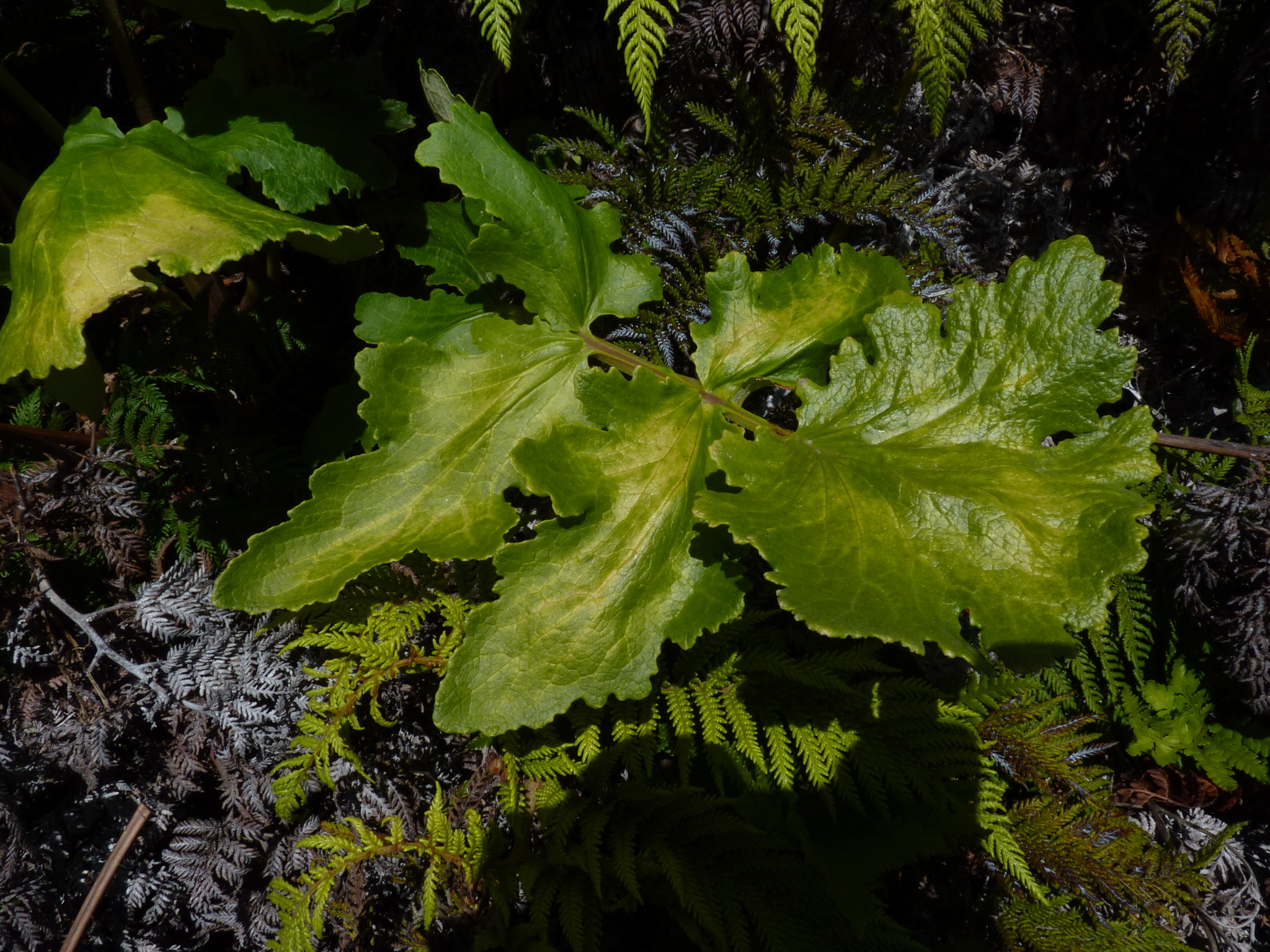

Conservation status
- Critically Endangered (IUCN 2.3)

Scientific classification
- Kingdom: Plantae
- Clade: Tracheophytes
- Clade: Angiosperms
- Clade: Eudicots
- Clade: Asterids
- Order: Asterales
- Family: Asteraceae
- Genus: Sonchus
- Subgenus: Sonchus subg. Dendroseris
- Species: S. regius

Binomial name
- Sonchus regius (Skottsb.) S.C.Kim & Mejías

Synonyms
- Dendroseris regia Skottsb.; Phoenicoseris regia (Skottsb.) Skottsb.

= Sonchus regius =

Species of flowering plant

Sonchus regius, synonym Dendroseris regia, is a species of flowering plant in the family Asteraceae. It is endemic to the Juan Fernández Islands of Chile. It is threatened by habitat loss.
