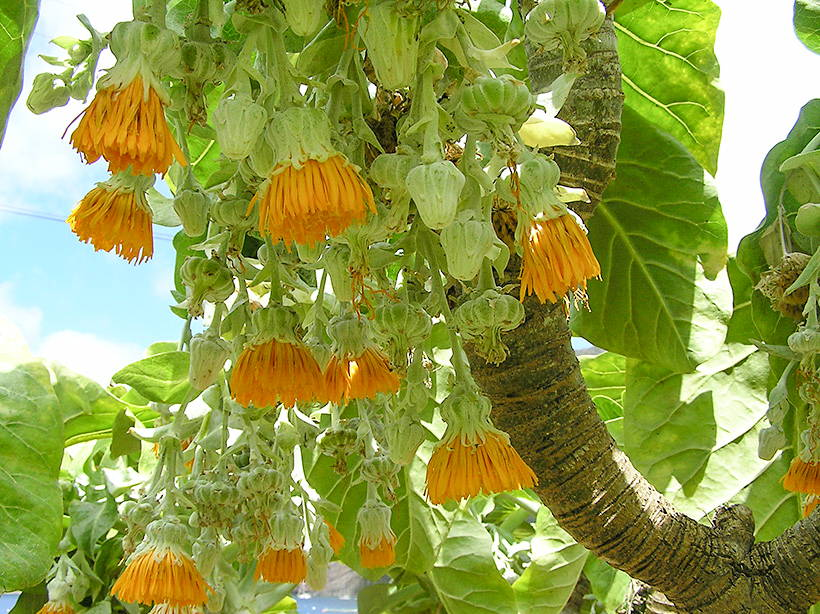

Conservation status
- Critically Endangered (IUCN 2.3)

Scientific classification
- Kingdom: Plantae
- Clade: Tracheophytes
- Clade: Angiosperms
- Clade: Eudicots
- Clade: Asterids
- Order: Asterales
- Family: Asteraceae
- Genus: Sonchus
- Subgenus: Sonchus subg. Dendroseris
- Species: S. brassicifolius

Binomial name
- Sonchus brassicifolius S.C.Kim & Mejías

Synonyms
- Dendroseris litoralis Skottsb.

= Sonchus brassicifolius =

Species of plant

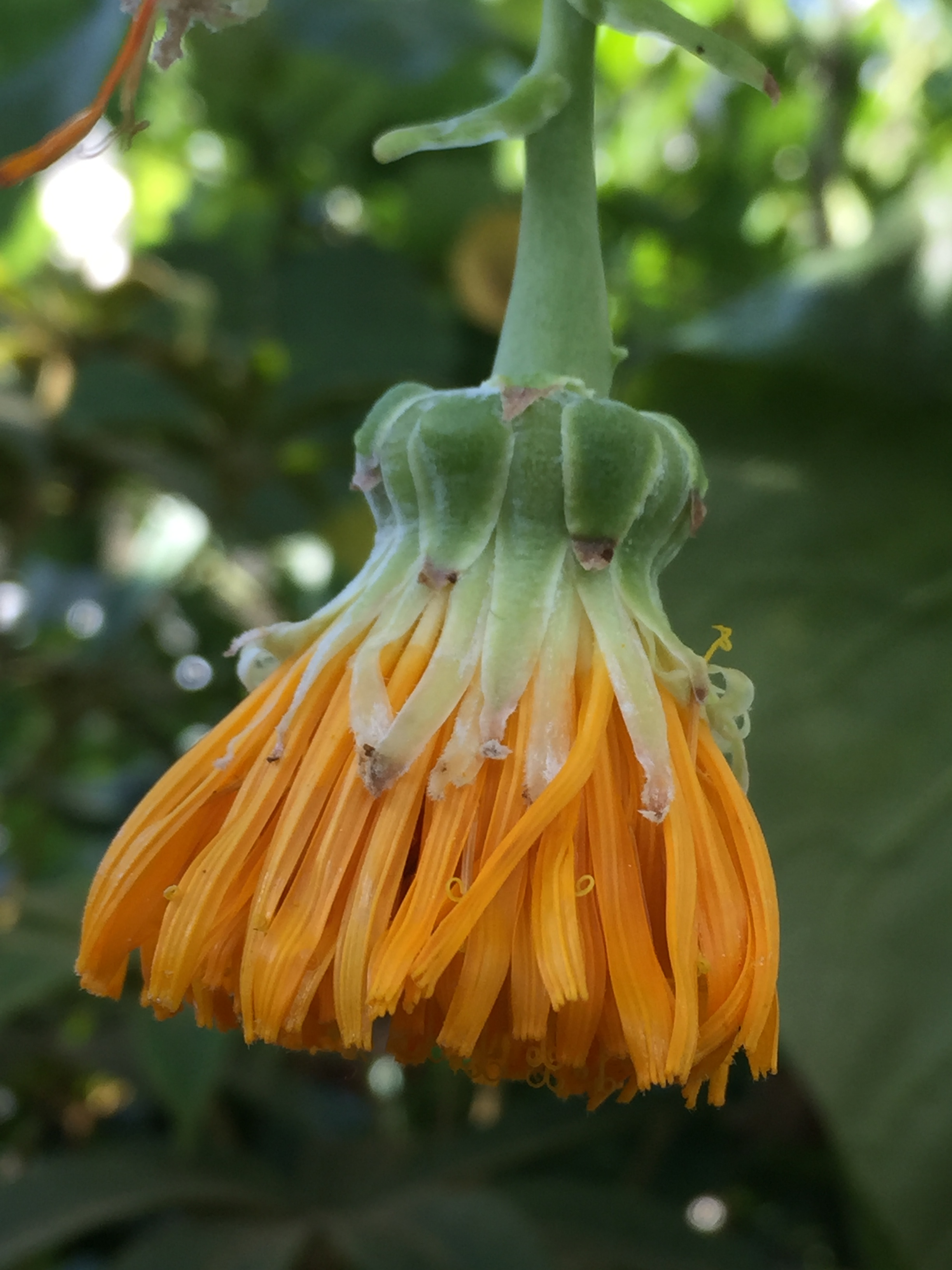
Single capitulum (one of many) of specimen flowering in Kew Gardens

Sonchus brassicifolius, synonym Dendroseris litoralis, is a species of flowering plant in the daisy and sunflower family Asteraceae. It is a small evergreen tree species known as the cabbage tree. It is endemic to the Juan Fernández Islands, which lie in the southeast Pacific, off the west coast of Chile. It is native only to the tiny, volcanic Robinson Crusoe Island, home of the famed Juania australis and many other endemic plants. The species is threatened by habitat loss and has been brought back from the brink of extinction. It had been reduced to only a few individuals by feral goats on the island, and is still considered critically endangered.

== Description ==
Younger trunks of Sonchus brassicifolius are ringed with pale leaf scars and distinctive rubbery, leathery leaves up to 46 centimetres (18 in) long. It grows into a small, gnarled tree with several somewhat palm-like crowns of very large, ovate leaves on whitish, green-spotted leaf stalks and pendent inflorescences of bright orange, tassel-like 'flowers' (capitula). It is easy to cultivate and enjoys a cool, humid climate. It is hardy to light freezes and California coastal conditions.

== Taxonomy ==
The species was first described in 1921 by Carl Skottsberg as Dendroseris litoralis. The genus Dendroseris was considered endemic to the Juan Fernández Islands. In 2012, based on molecular phylogenetic evidence, it was shown that Dendroseris was embedded within the genus Sonchus, and all its species were transferred to that genus, with Dendroseris reduced to a subgenus. As the combination Sonchus litoralis had already been used for a different species, the replacement name Sonchus brassicifolius was published.

== Edibility ==
The very large leaves are edible and formed part of the diet of voluntary castaway Alexander Selkirk - the possible inspiration for Daniel Defoe's character Robinson Crusoe - during his sojourn on one of the Juan Fernandez Islands.

== Hummingbird pollination ==
The capitula with their large orange corollas are hummingbird pollinated. The nectar composition of Sonchus brassicifolius has large quantities of sucrose (73%), 15% fructose and 10.9% glucose.

== Gallery ==
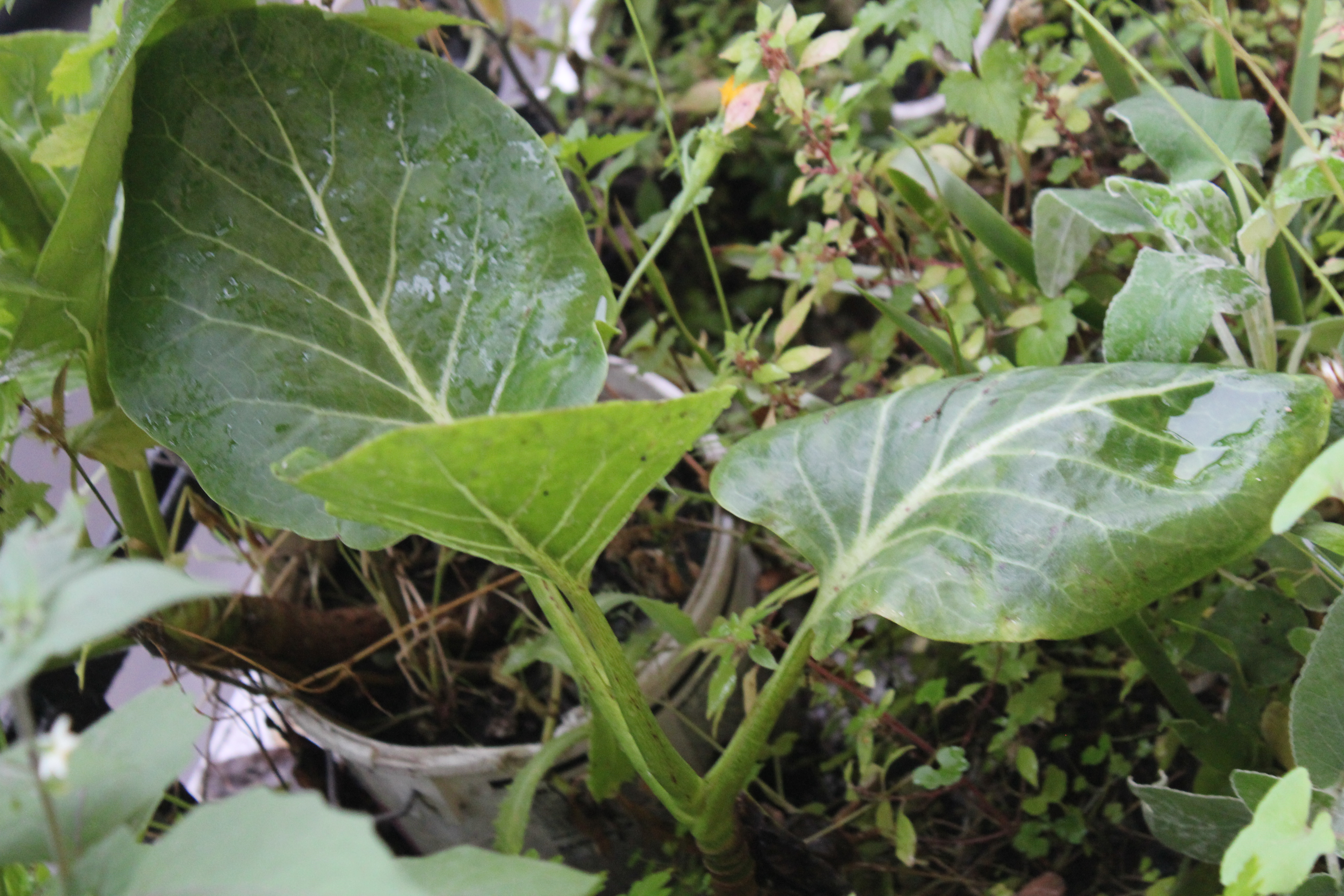
Seedling, cultivated plant

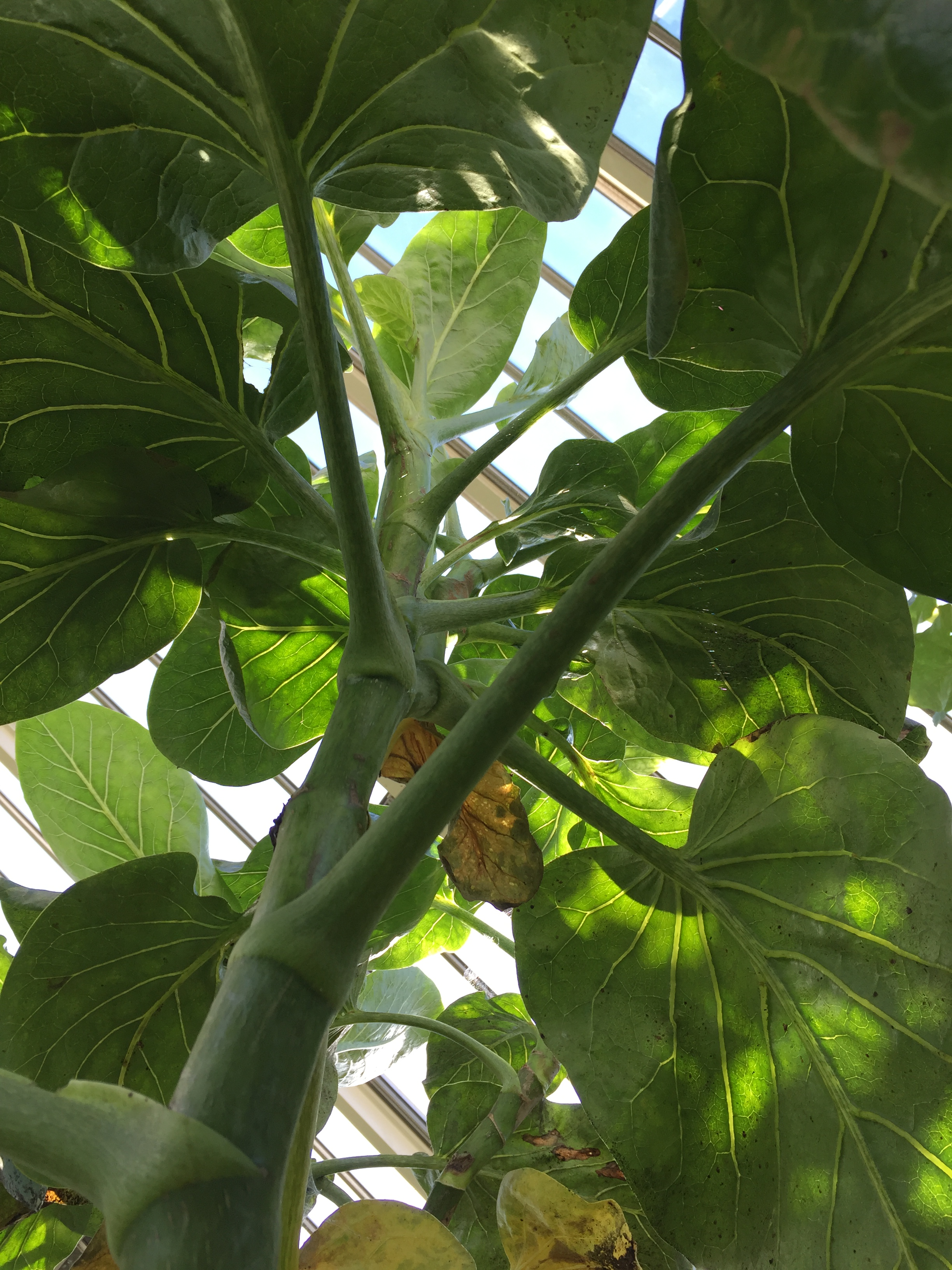
Canopy, viewed from beneath, of mature specimen flowering in Temperate House, Kew Gardens (flowers not visible in shot)

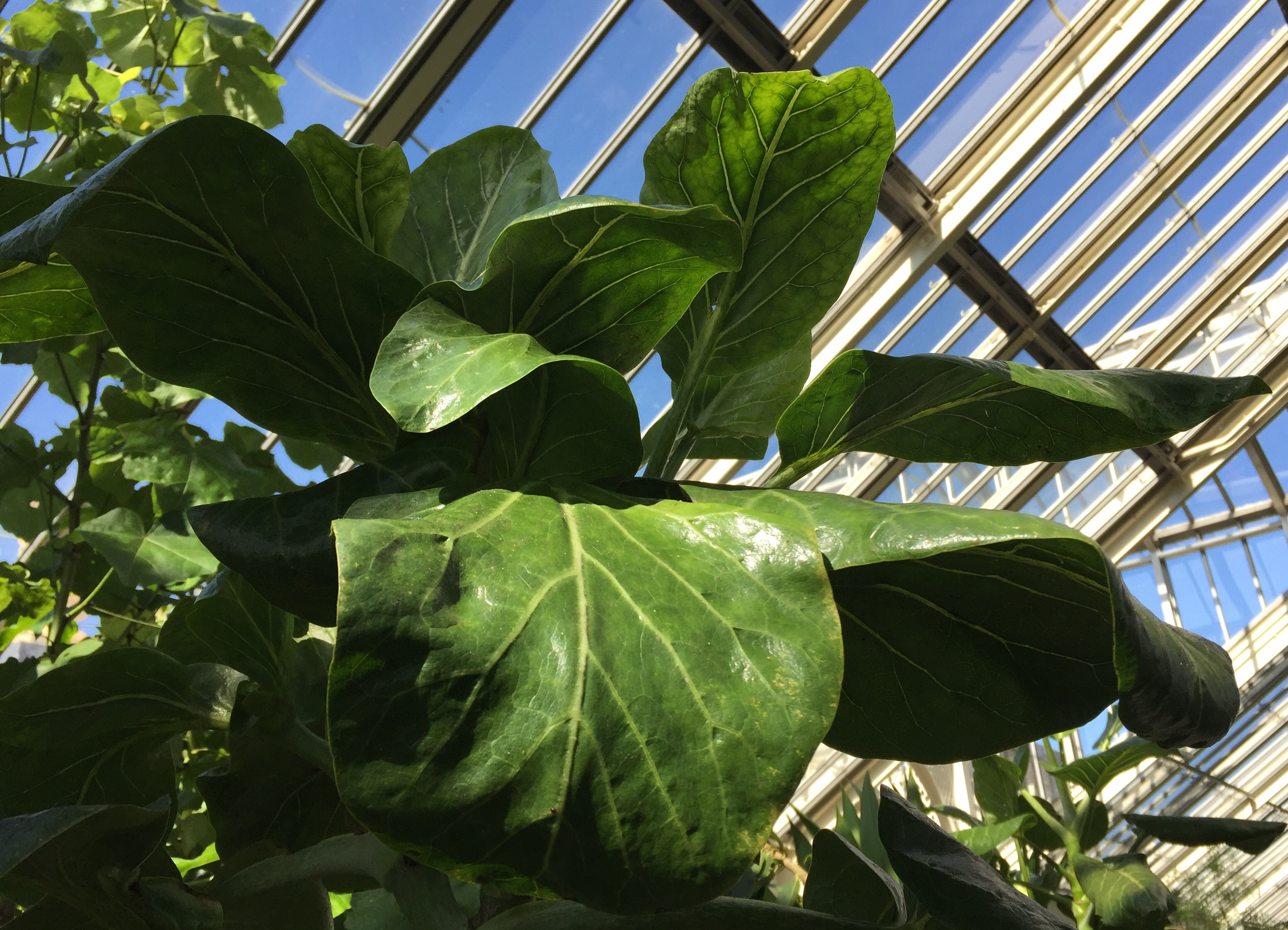
Crown of large, edible, cabbage-like leaves that earned the species the common name of cabbage tree (Temperate House, Kew Gardens)

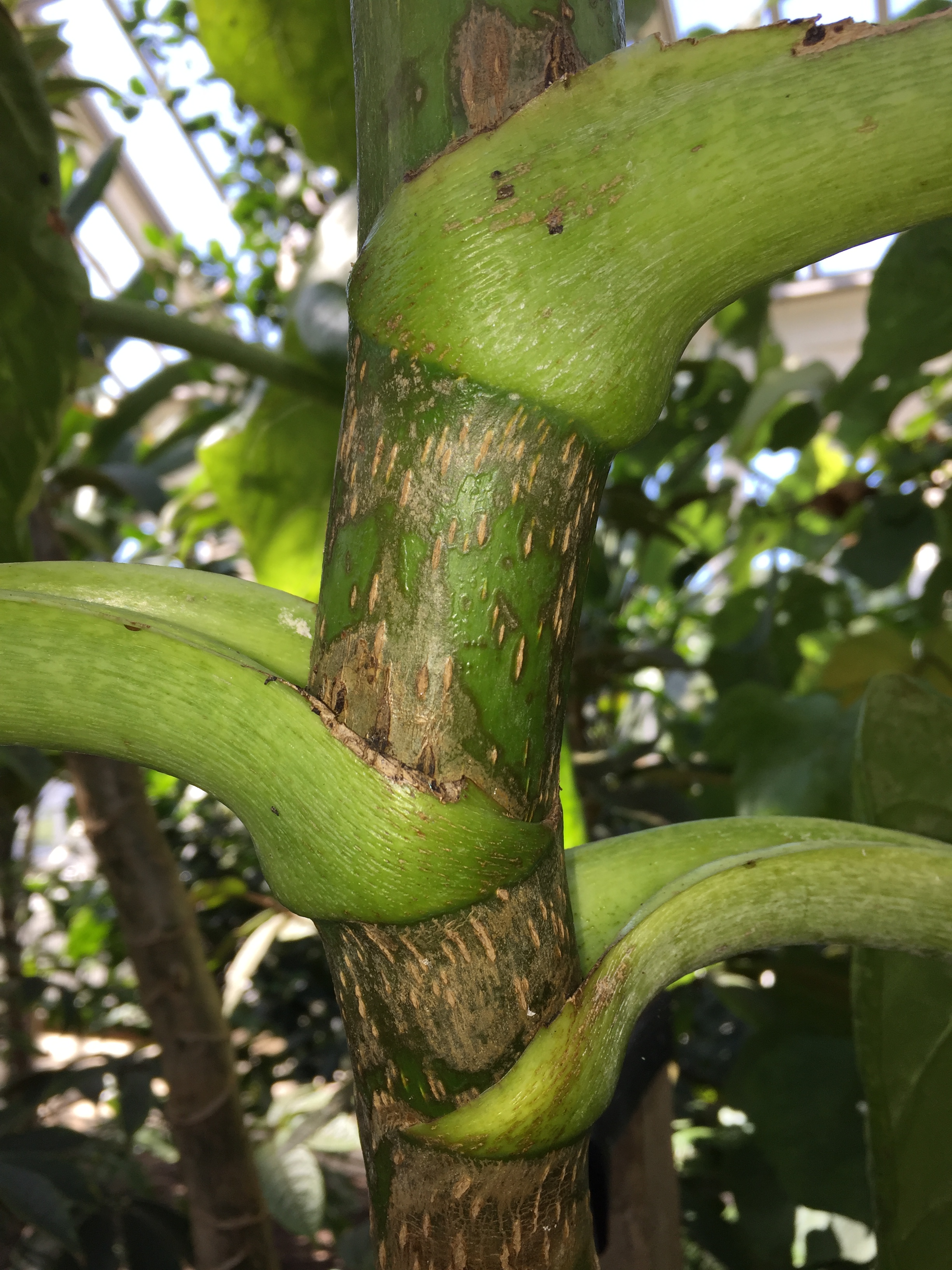
Young stem, showing attachment of bases of long, deeply-grooved petioles (Temperate House, Kew Gardens)

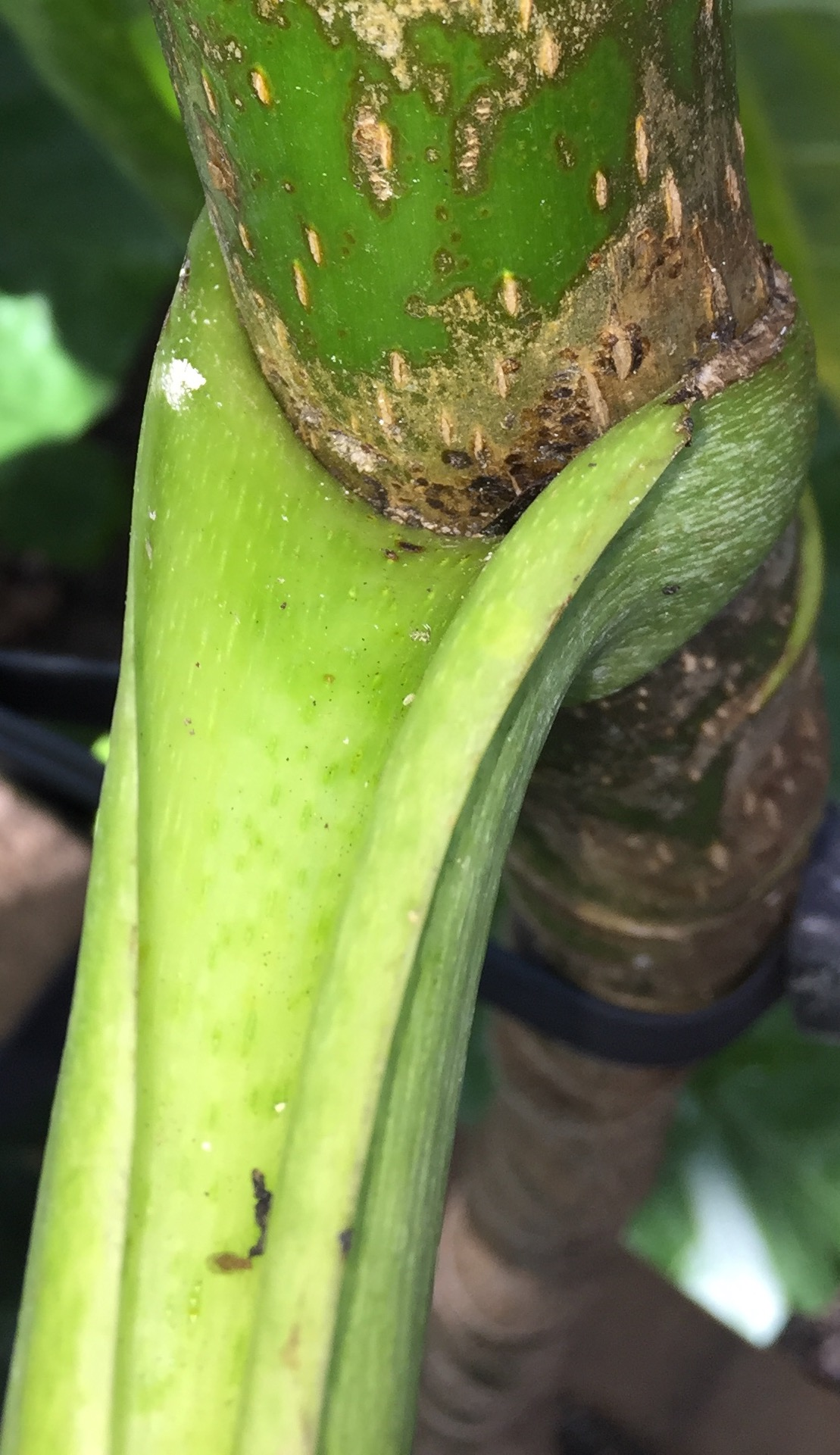
View from above of base of single petiole, showing deep channel and attachment to stem by crescent-shaped base (Temperate House, Kew Gardens)

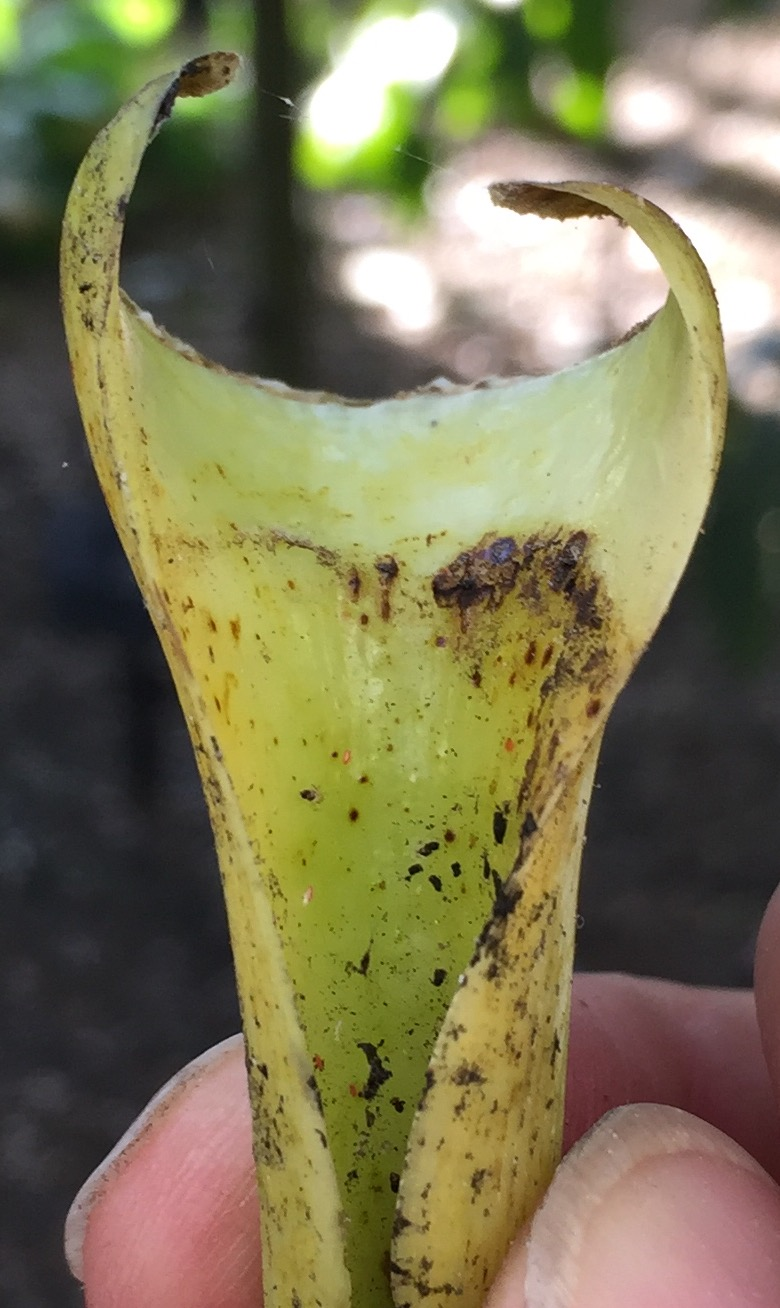
Crescent-shaped base of petiole of fallen leaf showing structure where formerly attached to young trunk (Temperate House, Kew Gardens)

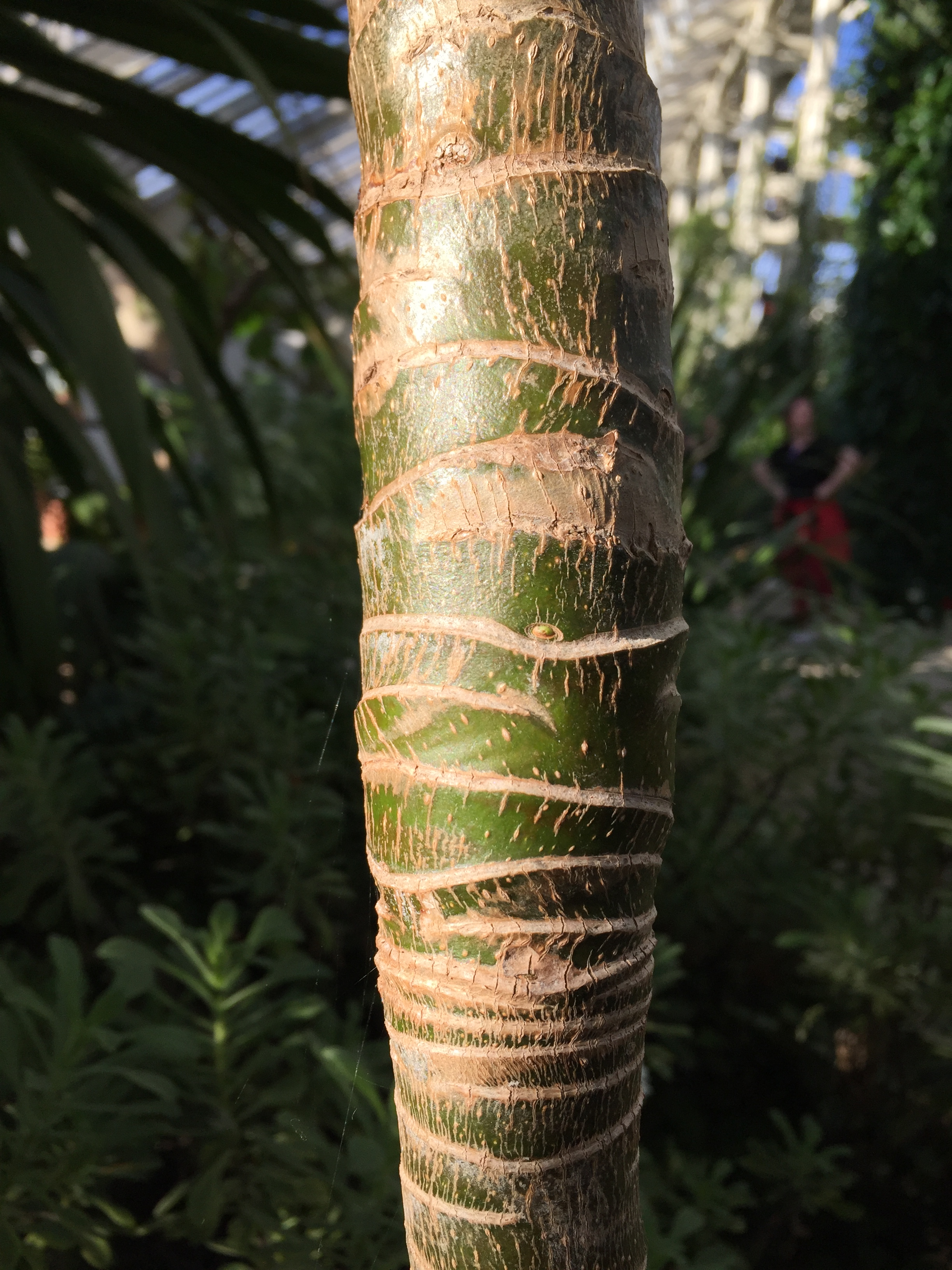
Young trunk bearing distinctive pale, annular leaf scars (Temperate House, Kew Gardens): note bud in centre of image

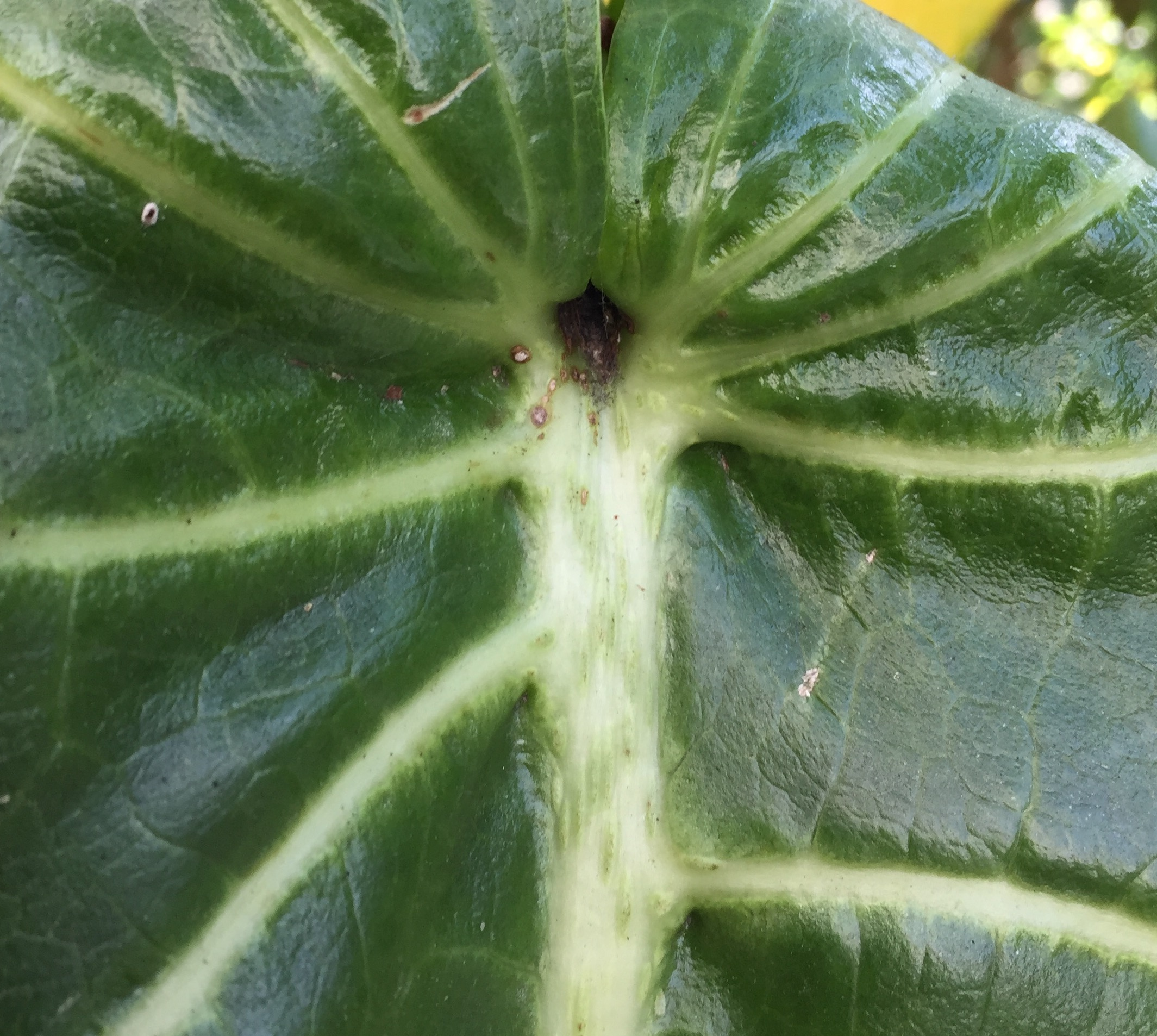
Upper surface of leaf at junction of petiole and lamina, showing palmate venation

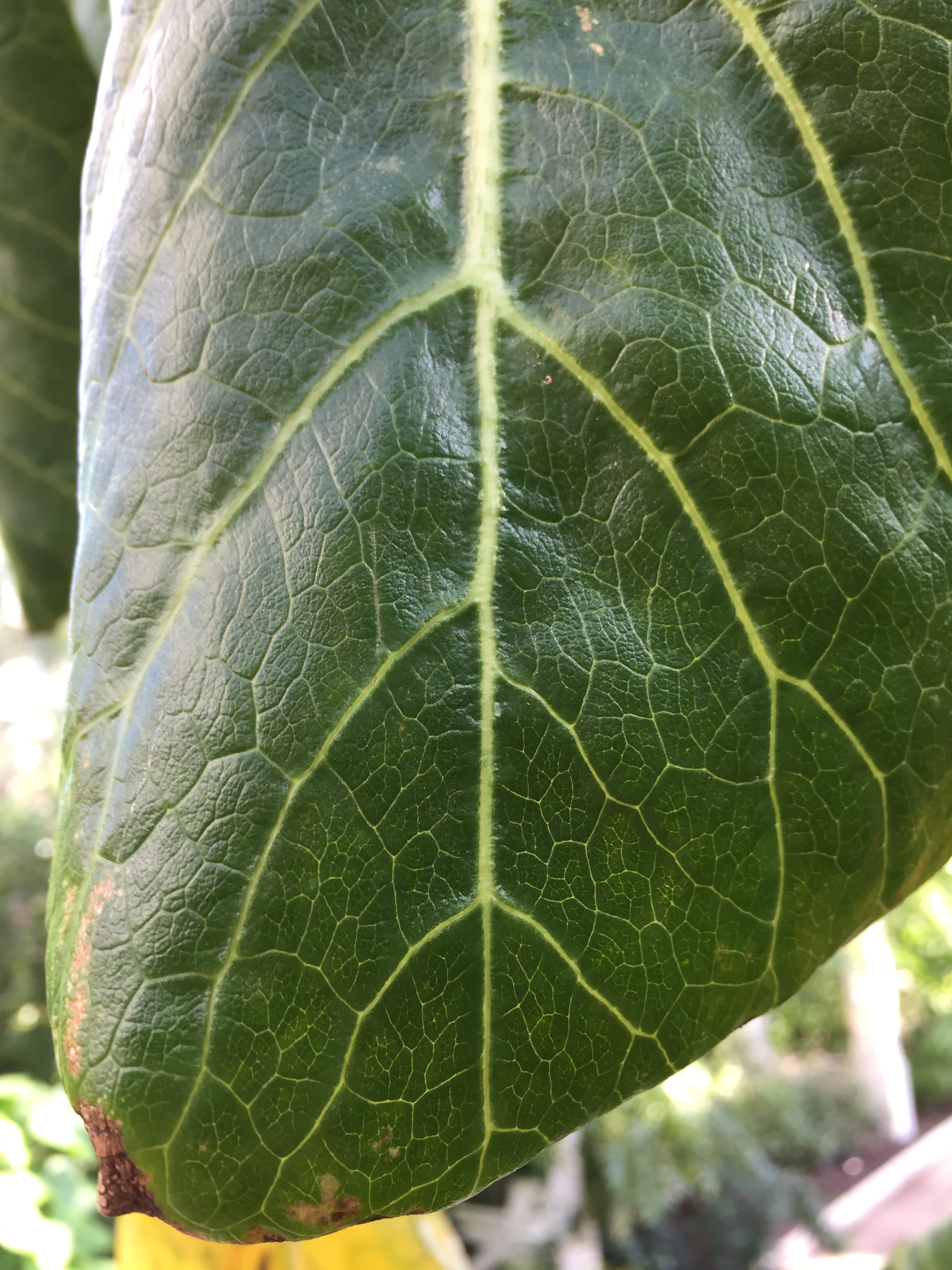
Detail of upper surface of leaf tip, showing glossy, rubbery texture and veins patterned with elongate spots (Temperate House, Kew Gardens)

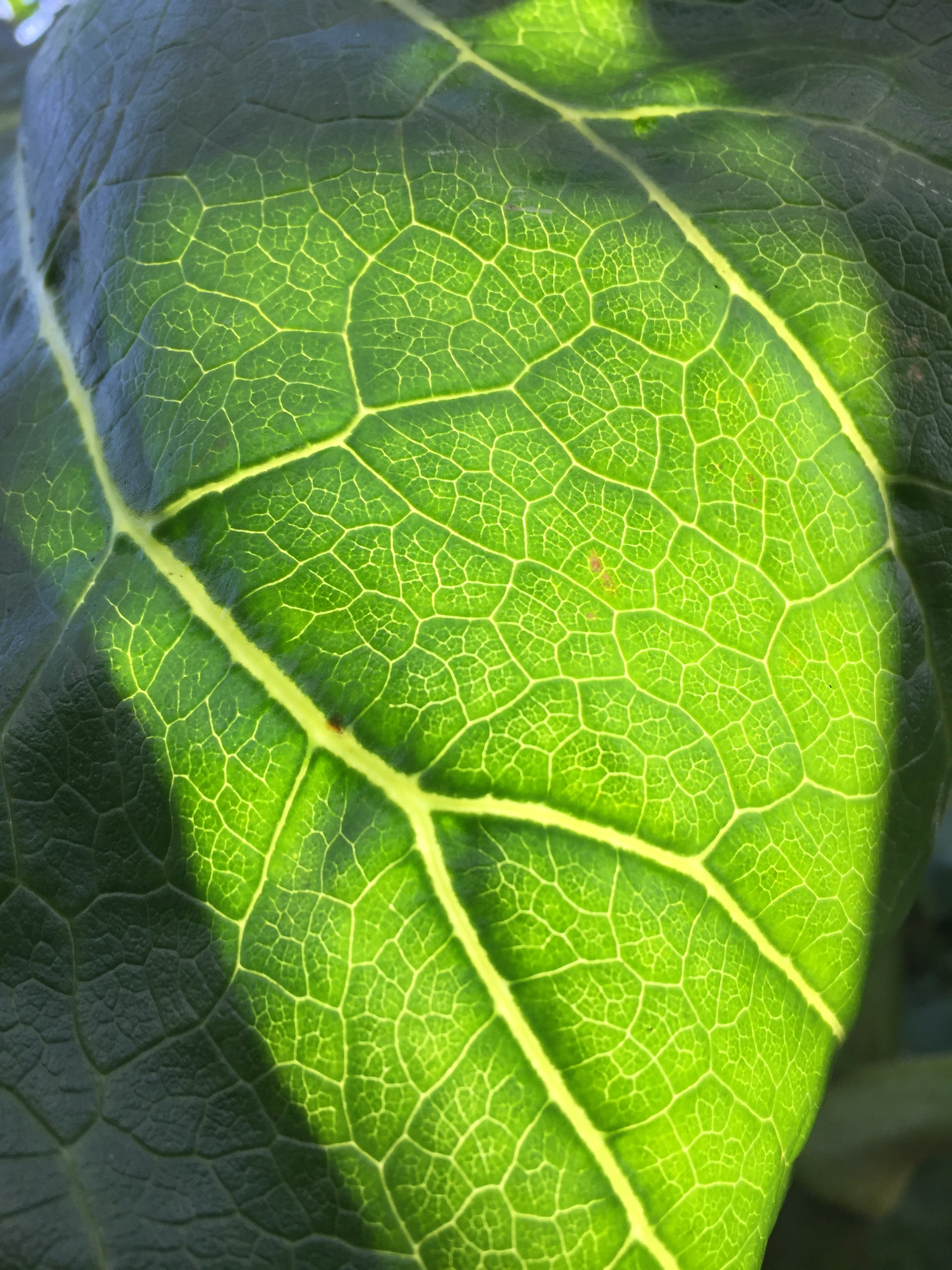
Part of upper surface of single leaf, back-lit to reveal fine detail of venation (Temperate House, Kew Gardens)

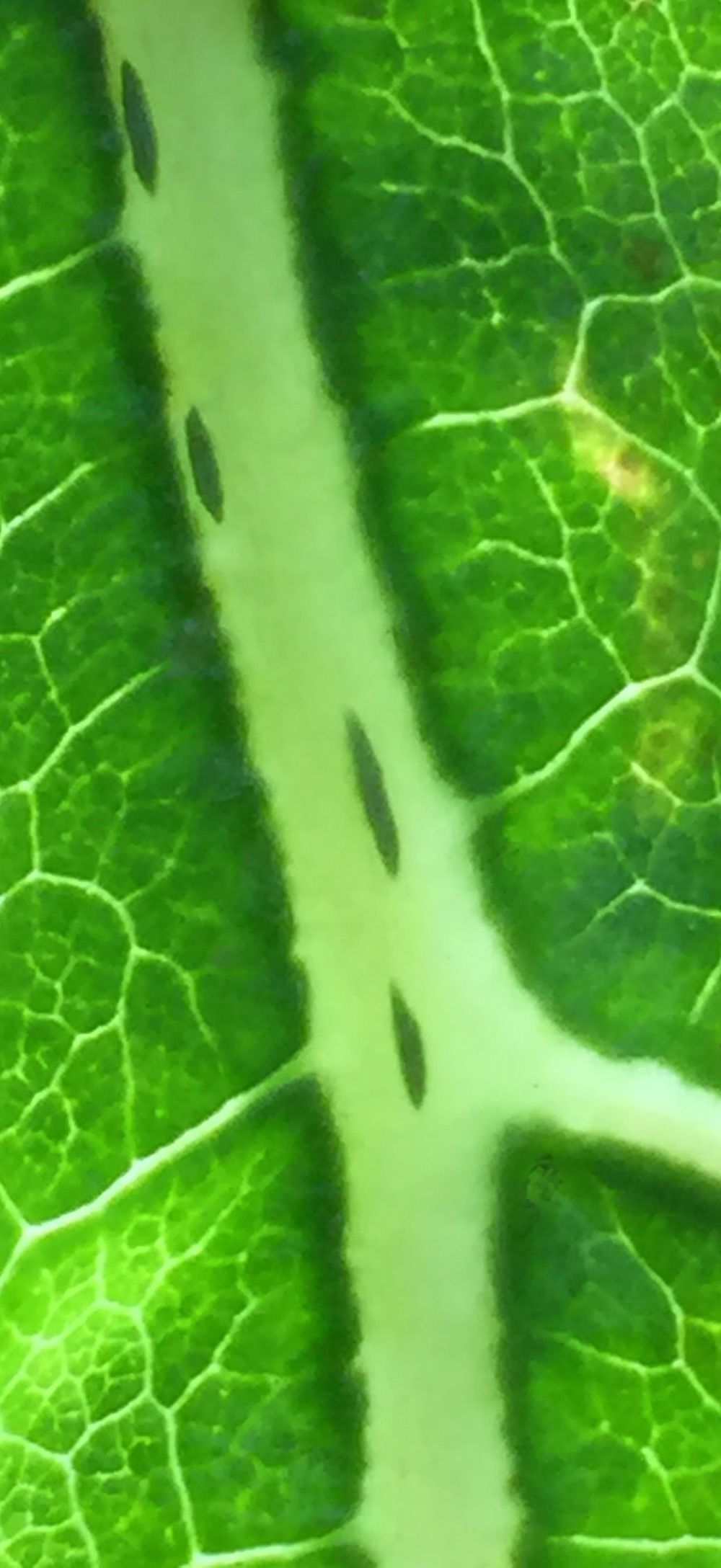
Detail of upper surface of leaf midrib (back-lit), showing distinctive, elongate, green spots

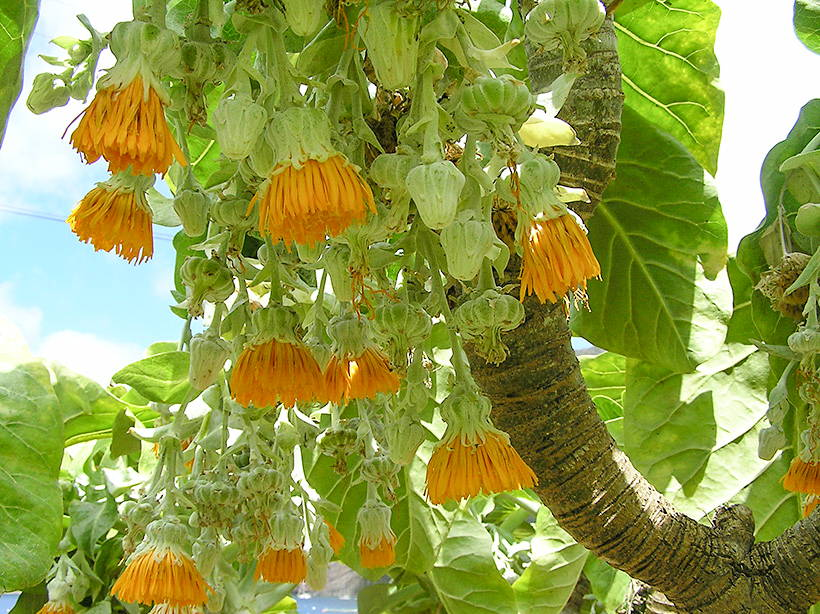
Wild specimen, flowering profusely in its native Juan Fernandez Islands

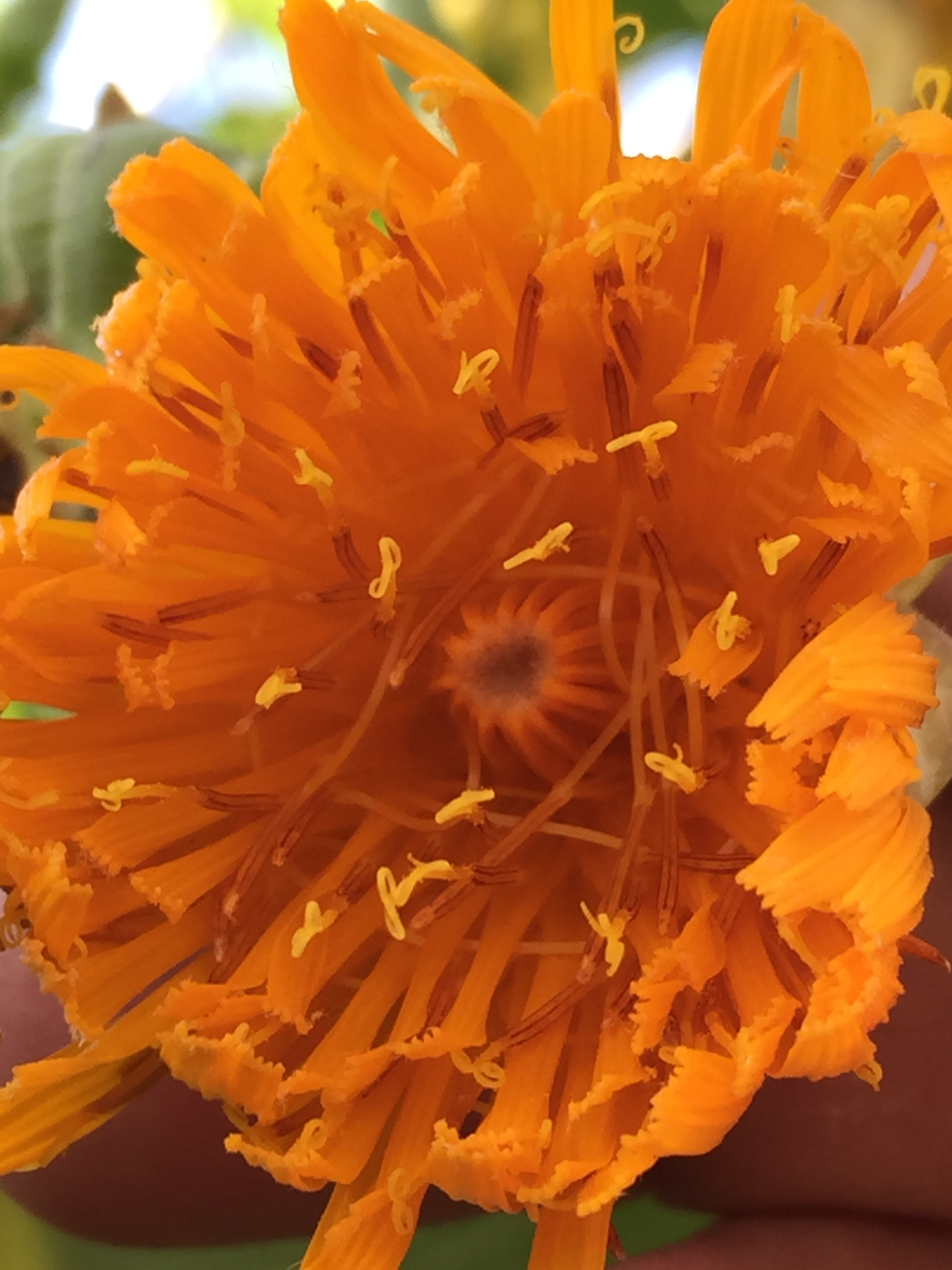
Interior of pendent, yellow-orange 'flower' (capitulum) (Temperate House, Kew Gardens)
