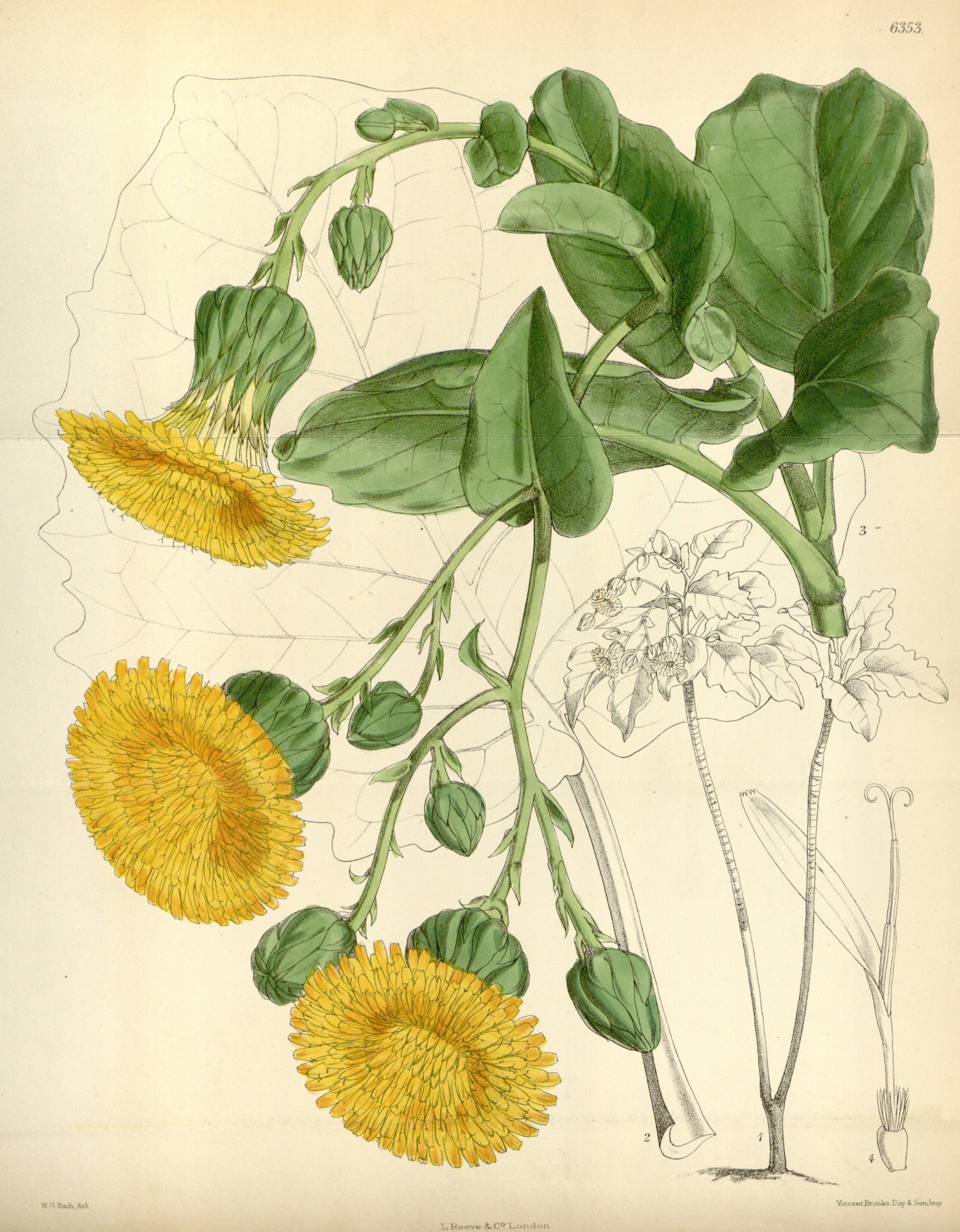

Conservation status
- Critically Endangered (IUCN 2.3)

Scientific classification
- Kingdom: Plantae
- Clade: Tracheophytes
- Clade: Angiosperms
- Clade: Eudicots
- Clade: Asterids
- Order: Asterales
- Family: Asteraceae
- Genus: Sonchus
- Subgenus: Sonchus subg. Dendroseris
- Species: S. splendens

Binomial name
- Sonchus splendens S.C.Kim & Mejías

Synonyms
- Dendroseris macrophylla D.Don

= Sonchus splendens =

Species of flowering plant

Sonchus splendens, synonym Dendroseris macrophylla, is a species of flowering plant in the family Asteraceae. It is endemic to the Juan Fernández Islands of Chile. It is threatened by habitat loss.

== Taxonomy ==
The species was first described in 1832 by David Don as Dendroseris macrophylla. In 2012, based on molecular phylogenetic evidence, it was shown that Dendroseris was embedded within the genus Sonchus, and all its species were transferred to that genus, placed in Sonchus subg. Dendroseris. As the combination Sonchus macrophyllus had already been used for a different species, the replacement name Sonchus splendens was published.
