= Carex berteroniana =

Scientific classification
- Kingdom: Plantae
- Clade: Tracheophytes
- Clade: Angiosperms
- Clade: Monocots
- Clade: Commelinids
- Order: Poales
- Family: Cyperaceae
- Genus: Carex
- Species: C. berteroniana

Binomial name
- Carex berteroniana Steud.

Species of grass-like plant

Carex berteroniana is a species of sedge native to the Juan Fernández Islands.
