= Yunquea =

Scientific classification
- Kingdom: Plantae
- Clade: Embryophytes
- Clade: Tracheophytes
- Clade: Spermatophytes
- Clade: Angiosperms
- Clade: Eudicots
- Clade: Asterids
- Order: Asterales
- Family: Asteraceae
- Subfamily: Carduoideae
- Tribe: Cardueae
- Subtribe: Centaureinae
- Genus: Yunquea; Skottsb.
- Species: Y. tenzii

Binomial name
- Yunquea tenzii Skottsb.

Synonyms
- Centaurodendron tenzii Skottsb.

Genus of flowering plants

Yunquea tenzii is a species of flowering plant in the family Asteraceae. It is the sole species in genus Yunquea. It is endemic to Robinson Crusoe Island in the Juan Fernández Islands of Chile.
