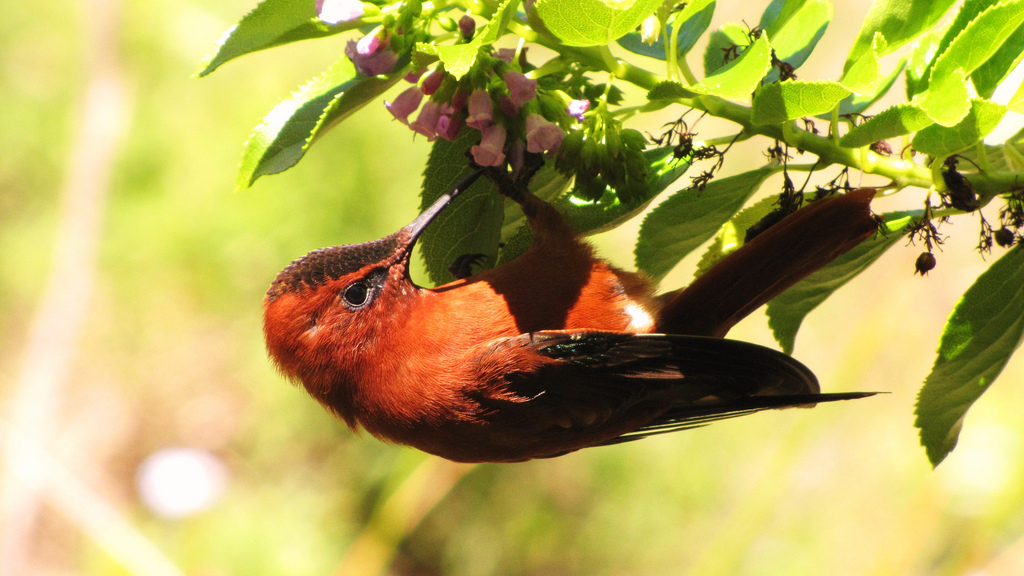
- Bird feeding on Cuminia eriantha flowers

Conservation status
- Critically Endangered (IUCN 2.3)

Scientific classification
- Kingdom: Plantae
- Clade: Embryophytes
- Clade: Tracheophytes
- Clade: Spermatophytes
- Clade: Angiosperms
- Clade: Eudicots
- Clade: Asterids
- Order: Lamiales
- Family: Lamiaceae
- Subfamily: Nepetoideae
- Tribe: Mentheae
- Genus: Cuminia; Colla
- Species: C. eriantha

Binomial name
- Cuminia eriantha (Benth.) Benth.

Synonyms
- Johowia Epling & Looser; Skottsbergiella Epling; Bystropogon erianthus Benth.; Cuminia fernandezia Colla; Skottsbergiella fernandezia (Colla) Epling; Johowia fernandezia (Colla) Epling & Looser; Cuminia brevidens Benth.; Phytoxis acidissima Bertero ex Benth.

= Cuminia =

Genus of flowering plants

Cuminia is a genus of flowering plant in the family Lamiaceae, first described in 1835. It contains only one known species, Cuminia eriantha. It is endemic to Robinson Crusoe Island, one of the Juan Fernández Islands in the southeast Pacific, off the coast of Chile and politically a part of that country.

Two varieties are recognized, regarded by some as distinct species:

1. Cuminia eriantha var. eriantha
2. Cuminia eriantha var. fernandezia (Colla) Harley

The species is listed as "critically endangered".
