= Federico Philippi =

German zoologist and botanist (1838-1910)

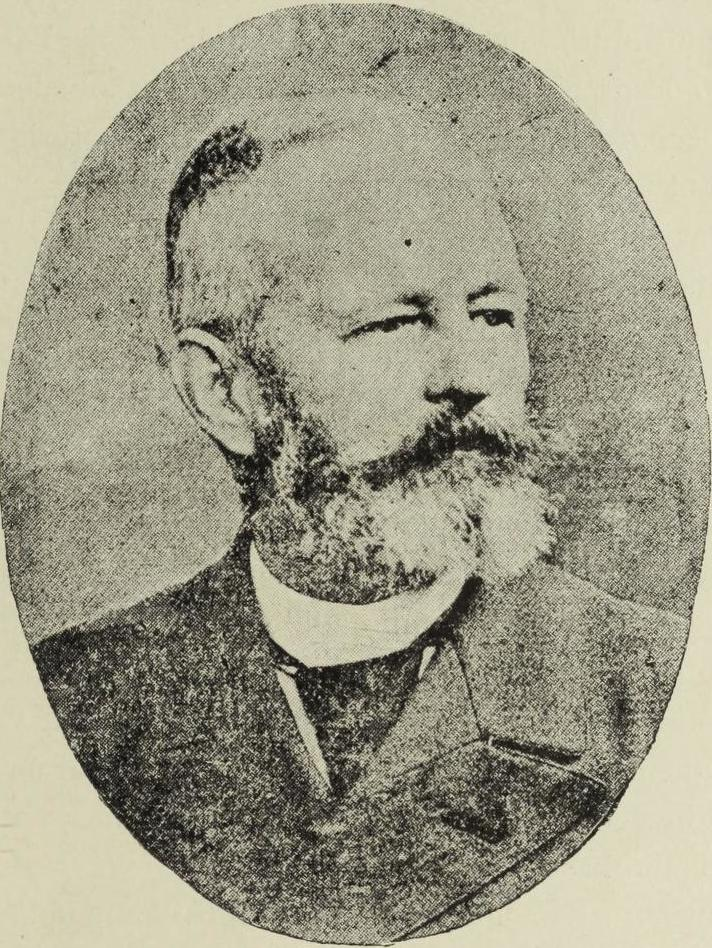
- Born: 16 December 1838; Naples, Kingdom of the Two Sicilies
- Died: 16 January 1910 (aged 71); Santiago, Chile
- Scientific career
- Author abbrev. (botany): F.Phil.

Federico Philippi or Friedrich Heinrich Eunom Philippi (16 December 1838 – 16 January 1910) was a German zoologist and botanist who was active in Chile. He was the youngest son of the famed naturalist Rodolfo Amando Philippi and Caroline Krumwiede. He was born in Naples. The son of Federico Philippi, Julio Philippi Bihl, became a lawyer, economist and politician. The granddaughter of Federico and daughter of Julio, Adriana married Jaime Eyzaguirre in 1934.
