= Desventuradas Islands =

Archipelago of Chile

Native name: Islas Desventuradas
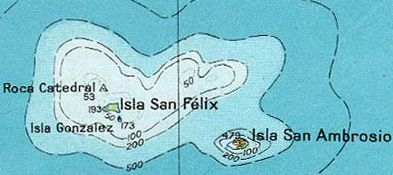
- Map of Desventuradas Islands, also known as San Félix Islands

- The Desventuradas Islands are part of oceanic Chile Desventuradas Islands (South America)

Geography
- Location: Chilean Sea
- Coordinates: 26.32°S 80°W
- Archipelago: Desventuradas
- Adjacent to: Pacific Ocean
- Total islands: 4
- Major islands: San Ambrosio, San Félix, González and Roca Catedral
- Area: 5.36 km^{2} (2.07 sq mi)(together)
- Highest elevation: 479 m (1572 ft) max.

Administration
- Chile
- Region: Valparaíso
- Province: Valparaíso Province
- Commune: Valparaíso

Demographics
- Population: 11

Additional information
- Time zone: Chile Standard Time (UTC-4)
  - Summer (DST): Chile Summer Time (UTC-3)
- NGA UFI= -900077 "San Ambrosio" -883263 "Gonzáles" -900282 "San Félix"

The Desventuradas Islands (Spanish: Islas Desventuradas, IPA: [ˈislas ðesβentuˈɾaðas], "Unfortunate Islands" or Islas de los Desventurados, "Islands of the Unfortunate Ones") is a group of four small oceanic islands located 850 kilometres (530 mi) off the coast of Chile, northwest of Santiago in the Pacific Ocean. They are considered part of Insular Chile.

Due to their isolation and difficulty of access there are no civilian settlements on these islands, but a detachment of the Chilean Navy is stationed on Isla San Félix, which also hosts the 2,000-metre (6,600 ft) Isla San Felix Airport.

== History ==
=== Prehistory ===
No signs of prehistoric human activity by Polynesians or Indigenous peoples of the Americas have ever been found on the islands, or on the neighboring Juan Fernández Islands. Michael Levinson's 1973 book The Settlement of Polynesia states, "the Juan Fernández Islands and San Felix and San Ambrosio were apparently unoccupied in pre-Columbian times and were not discovered by the Spanish until between 1563 and 1574. There is no evidence available to suggest that they were visited for fishing or other reasons by Amerindians before this."

=== Discovery ===
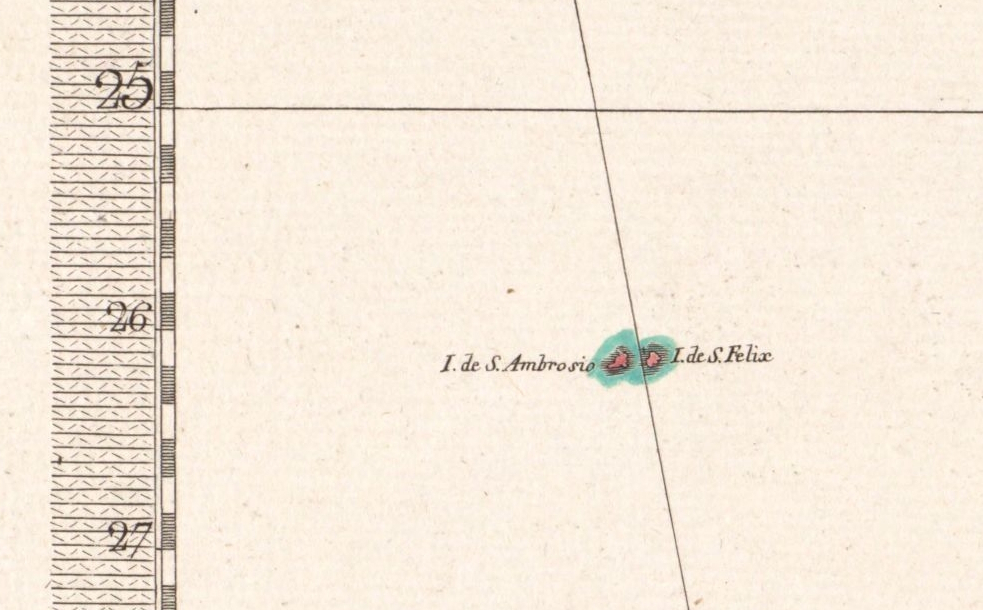
The islands in the 1775 Olmedilla's map, showing them as part of Chile.

The islands were possibly discovered by Ferdinand Magellan as early as 1521. The first confirmed sighting was by Juan Fernández on 6 November 1574 while voyaging from Callao to Valparaíso. Pedro Sarmiento de Gamboa wrote in 1579 that "they are now called after St. Felix and St. Ambor (i.e. Felix and Nabor)". However, the name of the martyr Ambor (Nabor) became confused with that of the more famous bishop Saint Ambrose (San Ambrosio). It is, probably, one of these islands that Captain John Davis struck one night in 1686. He was able to continue his voyage but erroneously reported the position of the incident.

=== The islands as part of the Kingdom of Chile ===
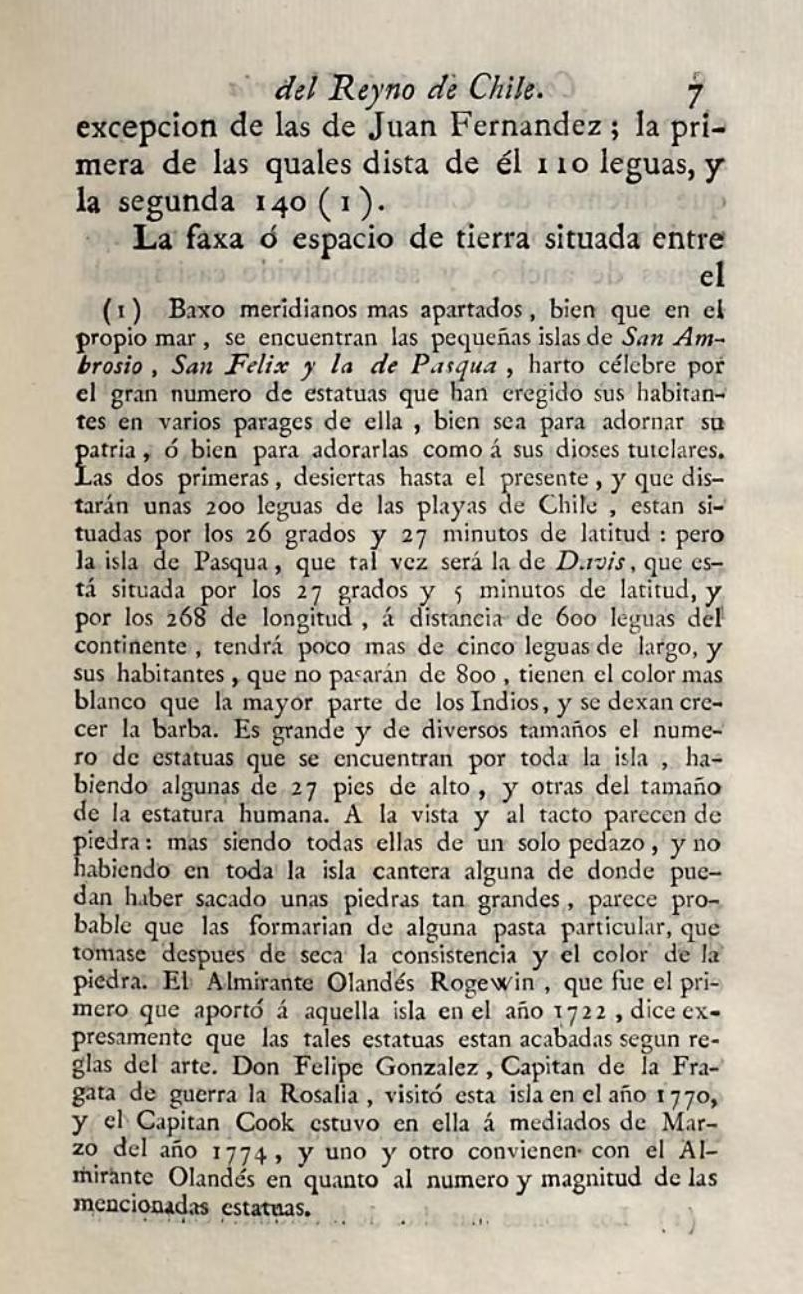
The islands are mentioned in an 18th Century book about the geography of the Kingdom of Chile.

The San Félix and San Ambrosio Islands of the Desventuradas Archipelago, as well as Easter Island, are mentioned by the abbot Giovanni Ignazio Molina as part of Chilean territory in his work Compendio de la historia geográfica, natural y civil del reyno de Chile (1788), and therefore are considered part of the territory inherited by Chile under the principle of uti possidetis iuris.

=== 20th century ===
San Felix played a part in the Falklands War. In May 1982, the Chilean government allowed an RAF Nimrod R1 to fly signals reconnaissance sorties from the island, gathering information on Argentine Air Force movements.

== Ecology ==
Vegetation of the larger islands is a miniature mosaic of matorral, barren rock, various sizes of trees, and shrubs mixed with ferns and perennial herbs. Sonchus laceratus is an endemic shrub species. The large islands, San Félix and San Ambrosio, are home to a critical WWF recognized temperate forest biome.

The marine fauna shares close affinities with the south Pacific and the central Pacific, more so than with the nearing South America. This is partly due to the Humboldt Current, which helps create a powerful biogeographic barrier between these islands and South America.

There are no permanent sources of fresh water on any of the islands. Vertebrates inhabiting both of the largest islands are limited to birds. Ten species of marine birds and one land bird species, some of them endangered, make their nests on or visit the islands. The island group has been recognised as an Important Bird Area (IBA) by BirdLife International because it is a breeding site for large numbers of Masatierra petrels.

== List of islands and location ==
The Desventuradas Islands, from east to west:

| Island/Rock | Area (km^{2}) | Peak Elevation (m) | Geographical Coordinates |
|---|---|---|---|
| San Ambrosio | 3.1 | 479 | 26°20′37″S 79°53′28″W |
San Felix group
| Islote González | 0.25 | 173 | 26°18′36″S 80°05′06″W |
| San Félix | 2 | Cerro Amarillo, 193 | 26°17′30″S 80°05′42″W |
| Roca Catedral | 0.01 | 53 | 26°16′25″S 80°07′15″W |
| Total | 5.36 | 479 | |

== See also ==
- List of islands of Chile
- Insular Chile
