= List of endemic plants of Madeira =

The Madeira Archipelago is a group of islands in the North Atlantic Ocean, west of the Iberian Peninsula. The archipelago consists of Madeira, the largest island, as well as Porto Santo Island and the Desertas Islands (Deserta Grande, Ilhéu Chão, and Bugio). The islands are home to dozens of endemic species and subspecies of vascular plants, including the endemic genera Chamaemeles, Musschia, Parafestuca, and Sinapidendron. Although the Madeira archipelago is politically part of Portugal, the World Geographical Scheme for Recording Plant Distributions treats Madeira as distinct botanical country. The archipelago is part of Macaronesia, a biogeographical region which also includes the Azores, Canary Islands, Cape Verde Islands, and the Selvagens.

Plants are listed alphabetically by plant family. Extinct and presumed extinct species are indicated with †.

== Amaranthaceae ==
- Beta patula Aiton – eastern Madeira incl. I. Chão

== Apiaceae ==
- Bunium brevifolium Lowe
- Daucus decipiens (Schrad. & J.C.Wendl.) Spalik, Wojew., Banasiak & Reduron
- Peucedanum lowei (Coss.) Menezes – central Madeira

== Aquifoliaceae ==
- Ilex canariensis subsp. azevinho (Sol. ex Lowe) G.Kunkel
- Ilex perado subsp. perado

== Araliaceae ==
- Hedera maderensis K.Koch ex A.Rutherf.

== Asparagaceae ==
- Asparagus umbellatus subsp. lowei (Kunth) Valdés
- Ruscus streptophyllus Yeo – central Madeira
- Semele androgyna subsp. pterygophora (J.G.Costa) M.Â.Carvalho
- Semele menezesii J.G.Costa

== Asphodelaceae ==
- Asphodelus fistulosus subsp. madeirensis Simon

== Aspleniaceae ==
- Asplenium lolegnamense (Gibby & Lovis) Viane

== Asteraceae ==
- Andryala crithmifolia Aiton
  - Andryala crithmifolia subsp. coronopifolia (Lowe) M.Z.Ferreira, R.Jardim, Alv.Fern. & M.Seq. – southern Madeira
  - Andryala crithmifolia subsp. crithmifolia – southern Madeira
- Andryala glandulosa Lam. – Madeira incl. Porto Santo I. and Desertas Is.
- Andryala subglabrata (DC.) M.Z.Ferreira, Alv.Fern. & M.Seq.
- Argyranthemum dissectum (Lowe) Lowe
- Argyranthemum haematomma Lowe
- Argyranthemum pinnatifidum (L.f.) Webb in P.B.Webb & S.Berthelot
  - Argyranthemum pinnatifidum subsp. montanum Rustan
  - Argyranthemum pinnatifidum subsp. pinnatifidum
  - Argyranthemum pinnatifidum subsp. succulentum (Lowe) Humphries
- Artemisia argentea L'Hér.
- Calendula suffruticosa subsp. maderensis (DC.) Govaerts
- Carduus squarrosus DC. ex Lowe
- Cheirolophus massonianus (Lowe) A.Hansen & Sunding
- Cirsium latifolium Lowe
- Crepis noronhaea Babc. ex Jenkins – Porto Santo I.
- Crepis vesicaria subsp. andryaloides (Lowe) Babc.
- Helichrysum devium J.Y.Johnson
- Helichrysum melaleucum Rchb. ex Holl
  - Helichrysum melaleucum subsp. melaleucum – Madeira incl. Deserta Grande
  - Helichrysum melaleucum subsp. roseum (Lowe) R.Jardim & M.Seq. – Porto Santo I.
- Helichrysum monizii Lowe
- Helichrysum obconicum DC. – Madeira (incl. I. Chão)
- Pericallis aurita (L'Hér.) B.Nord.
- Pericallis menezesii R.Jardim, K.E.Jones, Carine & M.Seq. – Porto Santo I.
- Sonchus fruticosus L.f.
- Sonchus latifolius (Lowe) R.Jardim & M.Seq.
- Sonchus parathalassius J.G.Costa ex R.Jardim & M.Seq. – Porto Santo I.
- Sonchus pinnatus Aiton
- Sonchus ustulatus Lowe
  - Sonchus ustulatus subsp. imbricatus (Lowe) R.Jardim & M.Seq.
  - Sonchus ustulatus subsp. ustulatus
- Tolpis macrorhiza (Banks ex Hook.) DC.
- Tolpis succulenta (Aiton) Lowe

== Berberidaceae ==
- Berberis maderensis Lowe – eastern Madeira

== Boraginaceae ==
- Echium candicans L.f. – central Madeira
- Echium nervosum W.T.Aiton – coastal Madeira
- Myosotis stolonifera subsp. hirsuta R.Schust.

== Brassicaceae ==
- Crambe fruticosa L.f.
  - Crambe fruticosa subsp. fruticosa – northern Madeira incl. Porto Santo I. and I. Chão
  - Crambe fruticosa subsp. pinnatifida (Lowe) Prina & Mart.-Laborde – southern Madeira
- Erysimum bicolor (Hornem.) DC.
- Erysimum maderense Polatschek – southwestern Madeira
- Matthiola maderensis Lowe
- Sinapidendron Lowe
  - Sinapidendron angustifolium (DC.) Lowe
  - Sinapidendron frutescens (Aiton) Lowe
    - Sinapidendron frutescens subsp. frutescens
    - Sinapidendron frutescens subsp. succulentum (Lowe) Rustan
  - Sinapidendron gymnocalyx (Lowe) Rustan
  - Sinapidendron rupestre Lowe – northern Madeira
  - Sinapidendron sempervivifolium Menezes – Deserta Grande

== Campanulaceae ==
- Musschia Dumort.
  - Musschia aurea (L.f.) Dumort. – Madeira incl. Desertas Is.
  - Musschia isambertoi M.Seq. – Deserta Grande
  - Musschia wollastonii Lowe

== Caryophyllaceae ==
- Cerastium vagans var. vagans – central Madeira

== Celastraceae ==
- Maytenus umbellata (R.Br.) Mabb.

== Convolvulaceae ==
- Convolvulus massonii F.Dietr.

== Crassulaceae ==
- Aeonium glandulosum (Aiton) Webb & Berthel.
- Aeonium glutinosum Aiton) Webb & Berthel.
- Aeonium × lowei P.V.Heath (A. glandulosum × A. glutinosum)
- Aichryson divaricatum (Aiton) Praeger
- Aichryson dumosum (Lowe) Praeger – southwestern Madeira
- Aichryson villosum (Aiton) Webb & Berthel.
- Sedum brissemoretii Raym.-Hamet
- Sedum farinosum Lowe
- Sedum fusiforme Lowe
- Sedum nudum Aiton

== Cyperaceae ==
- Carex lowei Bech. – northern and central Madeira
- Carex sequeirae Míguez, Jim.Mejías, Ben.Benítez & Martín-Bravo

== Ericaceae ==
- Erica maderensis (Benth.) Bornm.
- Erica platycodon subsp. maderincola (D.C.McClint.) Rivas Mart. & al.
- Vaccinium padifolium Sm.

== Euphorbiaceae ==
- Euphorbia piscatoria Aiton

== Fabaceae ==
- Anthyllis lemanniana Lowe – eastern Madeira
- Genista maderensis (Webb & Berthel.) Lowe
- Genista paivae Lowe
- Genista tenera (Jacq. ex Murray) Kuntze
- Lotus glaucus var. floridus (Lowe) Brand – Porto Santo I.
- Lotus glaucus subsp. glaucus
- Lotus loweanus Webb & Berthel.
- Lotus macranthus Lowe
- Ononis costae Menezes
- Vicia capreolata Lowe
- Vicia costae A.Hansen
- Vicia ferreirensis Goyder
- Vicia micrantha Lowe
- Vicia pectinata Lowe
- Vicia sativa subsp. devia J.G.Costa

== Geraniaceae ==
- Geranium maderense Yeo – Madeira (north-facing rocky areas)
- Geranium palmatum Cav. – Madeira (near Levadas)
- Geranium yeoi Aedo & Muñoz Garm.

== Hymenophyllaceae ==
- Hymenophyllum maderense Gibby & Lovis

== Juncaceae ==
- Luzula seubertii Lowe

== Lamiaceae ==
- Bystropogon maderensis Webb & Berthel.
- Bystropogon punctatus L'Hér. – northern and western Madeira
- Bystropogon × schmitzii (Menezes) Menezes (B. maderensis × B. punctatus) – Madeira (Ribiero Frio)
- Lavandula pedunculata subsp. maderensis (Benth.) Menezes – southeastern Madeira incl. Porto Santo I.
- Micromeria maderensis Puppo & Bräuchler
- Sideritis candicans Aiton
  - Sideritis candicans var. candicans
  - Sideritis candicans var. crassifolia Lowe – eastern Madeira incl. Desertas Is.
  - Sideritis candicans var. multiflora Mend.-Heuer – Porto Santo
- Teucrium abutiloides L'Hér.
- Teucrium betonicum L'Hér.
- Teucrium francoi M.Seq.
- Teucrium heterophyllum subsp. heterophyllum – southern Madeira incl. northern I. Chão

== Lycopodiaceae ==
- Lycopodiella veigae (Vasc.) O.Eriksson, A.Hansen & Sunding

== Oleaceae ==
- Jasminum azoricum L.
- Olea europaea subsp. cerasiformis G.Kunkel & Sunding

== Orchidaceae ==
- Dactylorhiza foliosa (Rchb.f.) Soó
- Goodyera macrophylla Lowe – northern and central Madeira
- Orchis mascula subsp. scopulorum (Summerh.) H.Sund. ex H.Kretzschmar, Eccarius & H.Dietr. – eastern Madeira

== Orobanchaceae ==
- Odontites hollianus (Lowe) Benth.

== Plantaginaceae ==
- Digitalis sceptrum L.f.
- Plantago arborescens subsp. costae (Menezes) M.Seq. & R.Jardim – central Madeira
- Plantago malato-belizii Lawalrée – Madeira (Caldeirão do Inferno)
- Plantago subspathulata Pilg.
- Sibthorpia peregrina L.

== Plumbaginaceae ==
- Armeria maderensis Lowe – central Madeira
- Limonium lowei R.Jardim, M.Seq., Capelo, J.C.Costa & Rivas Mart. – Porto Santo I.

== Poaceae ==
- Anthoxanthum maderense H.Teppner – central Madeira
- Avenella flexuosa subsp. maderensis (Hack. & Bornm.) Veldkamp
- Deschampsia argentea (Lowe) Lowe
- Festuca donax Lowe – central Madeira
- Holcus pintodasilvae M.Seq. & Castrov.
- Koeleria loweana Quintanar, Catalán & Castrov.
- Parafestuca E.B.Alexeev
  - Parafestuca albida (Lowe) E.B.Alexeev
- Phalaris maderensis (Menezes) Menezes

== Polygonaceae ==
- Rumex simpliciflorus subsp. maderensis (Murb.) Sam. southern Madeira

== Polypodiaceae ==
- Arachniodes webbiana subsp. webbiana
- Dryopteris aitoniana Pic.Serm.
- Dryopteris × furadensis Bennert, Rasbach, K.Rasbach & Viane (D. aitoniana × D. intermedia subsp. maderensis)
- Dryopteris intermedia subsp. maderensis (Alston) Fraser-Jenk.
- Polypodium × encumeadense (Neuroth, W.Jäger & Bennert) Rumsey, Carine & Robba (P. macaronesicum × P. vulgare)
- Polystichum drepanum (Sw.) C.Presl
- Polystichum falcinellum (Sw.) C.Presl
- Polystichum × maderense Johns. (P. falcinellum × P. setiferum)

== Ranunculaceae ==
- † Delphinium maderense C.Blanché – Madeira (Vale da Alegria). Last recorded in 1956.

== Rosaceae ==
- Chamaemeles Lindl.
  - Chamaemeles coriacea Lindl.
- Marcetella maderensis (Bornm.) Svent.
- Rosa mandonii Déségl.
- Rubus serrae Soldano
- Rubus suspiciosus Menezes
- Rubus vahlii Frid.
- Sorbus maderensis (Lowe) Dode

== Rubiaceae ==
- Galium productum Lowe – central and southern Madeira

== Sapotaceae ==
- Sideroxylon mirmulano R.Br.

== Saxifragaceae ==
- Saxifraga maderensis D.Don
  - Saxifraga maderensis var. maderensis
  - Saxifraga maderensis var. pickeringii (C.Simon) D.A.Webb & Press
- Saxifraga portosanctana Boiss.

== Scrophulariaceae ==
- Scrophularia hirta Lowe
- Scrophularia lowei Dalgaard
- Scrophularia moniziana Menezes
- Scrophularia pallescens Lowe ex Menezes
- Scrophularia racemosa Lowe

== Solanaceae ==
- Solanum trisectum Dunal

== Viburnaceae ==
- Sambucus lanceolata R.Br.

== Violaceae ==
- Viola paradoxa Lowe
- Viola sequeirae Capelo
