= Madeira evergreen forests =

Ecological zone of Madeira and nearby islands

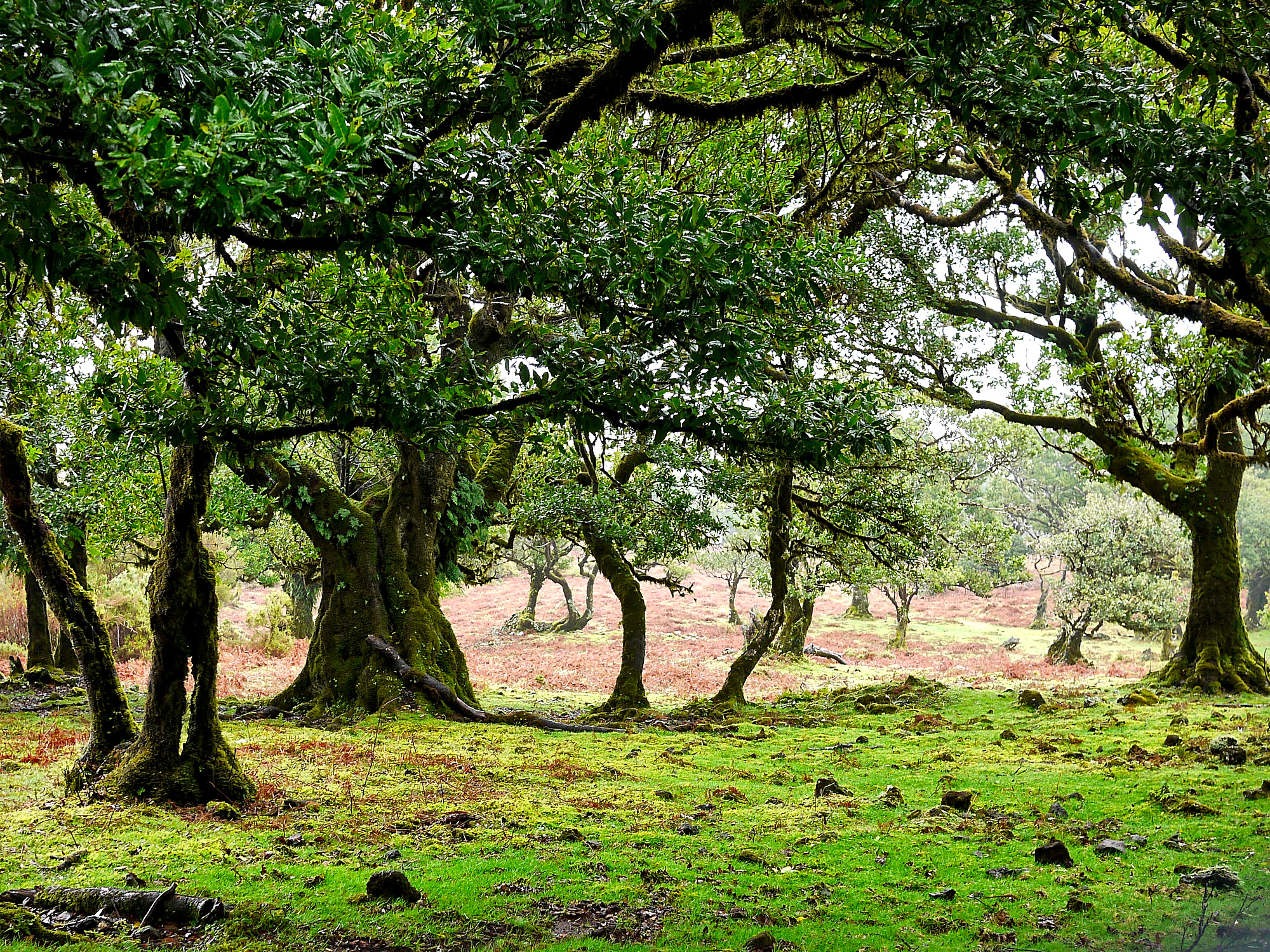
- Laurissilva on Madeira

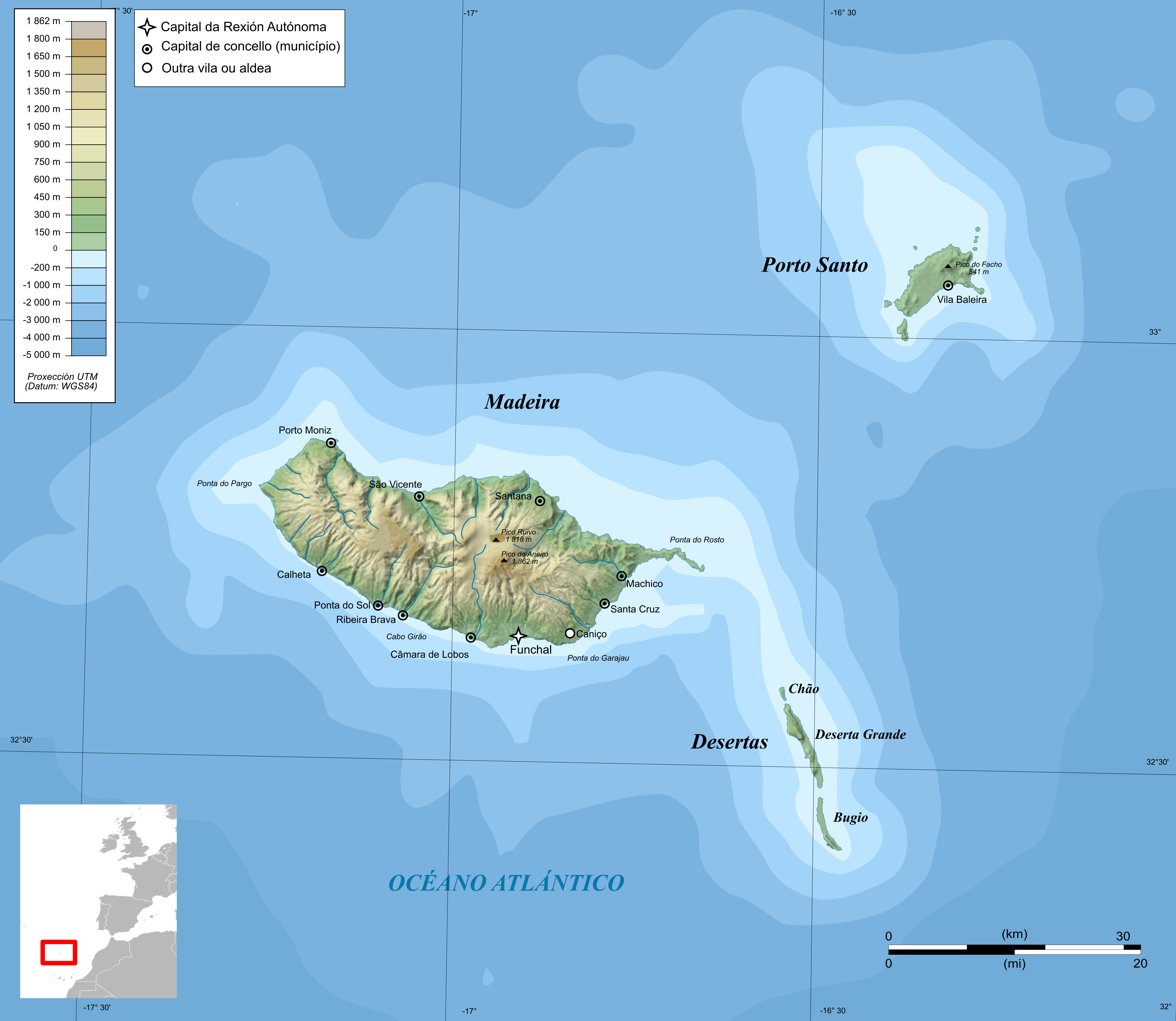
- Map of the Madeiran archipelago

Ecology
- Realm: Palearctic
- Biome: temperate broadleaf and mixed forests

Geography
- Area: 801 km^{2} (309 mi^{2})
- Country: Portugal
- Autonomous region of Portugal: Madeira

Conservation
- Conservation status: vulnerable
- Protected: 483 km^{2} (60%)

The Madeira evergreen forests is a laurissilva ecoregion of southwestern Europe. It covers the archipelago of Madeira and some nearby islands (Desertas and Selvagens) in the Atlantic Ocean. Laurel forest (Laurisilva) once covered the islands. Over centuries the laurel forests were mostly cleared. Madeira's remaining forests are now protected.

== Geography ==
The islands are an autonomous region of Portugal. They lie southwest of the Portuguese mainland in the Atlantic Ocean, 978 kilometres (608 mi) southwest of Lisbon and 560 kilometres (350 mi) west of Morocco.

Madeira is the largest island and highest island, with an area of 741 square kilometres (286 sq mi). The island extends east–west approximately 57 kilometres (35 mi), and is 22 kilometres (14 mi) at its widest point. A mountainous spine runs the length of the island, and Pico Ruivo, the highest peak, reaches 1,861 meters (6,106 ft) above sea level. Porto Santo Island, which lies 43 kilometres (27 mi) northeast of Madeira. is the second-largest island with an area of 42.2 square kilometres (16.3 sq mi).

The Desertas Islands are a chain of three narrow islands about 25 kilometres (16 mi) southeast of Madeira, covering an area of 14.2 square kilometres (5.5 sq mi).

The Selvagens are a group of small islands lying 280 kilometres (170 mi) south of Madeira, and 165 kilometres (103 mi) north of the Canary Islands. The Selvagens have a total area of 2.73 square kilometres (1.05 sq mi).

The islands are volcanic in origin. Basalt and volcanic ash are common substrate rocks, with some areas of uplifted limestone of marine origin. The volcanic soils are generally fertile, sustaining both the native forests and agriculture on the two larger islands.

The islands of Madeira and Porto Santo are inhabited. The archipelago has a population of 289,000 (2016 estimate), mostly on Madeira. Funchal, on Madeira's south shore, is the islands' largest city and principal port.

== Climate ==
The climate of Madeira is subtropical and maritime. The average annual temperature ranges between 15 and 20 °C at sea level. The climate becomes more temperate with elevation, and frost and snow occur most winters on Madeira's high elevations. Average annual precipitation ranges from 250 to 750 millimetres (9.8 to 29.5 in). Prevailing winds are from the northeast, and rainfall is higher on the windward north side of the island. The mountain slopes are frequently shrouded in orographic clouds and fog, sustaining cloud forests in the wettest areas.

== Flora ==
Madeira has about 1,226 native species of vascular plants. 66 vascular plant species are endemic to the islands, including the endemic genera Chamaemeles, Musschia, Parafestuca, and Sinapidendron. Madeiran endemics include Polystichum drepanum, Armeria maderensis, Goodyera macrophylla, Viola paradoxa, Crambe fruticosa, Matthiola maderensis, Sinapidendron angustifolium, Saxifraga maderensis, Sorbus maderensis, Genista maderensis, Pericallis aurita, Phalaris maderensis, and Musschia wollastonii. Another 54 species are endemic to Macaronesia. Over half of Madeira's plant species are also found in the Mediterranean Basin.

Before Madeira was settled, laurel forests, known as laurissilva covered most of the island. Laurissilva now covers 16 % of the island, and is found between 300 and 1,300 metres (980 and 4,270 ft) elevation on the Madeira's wet north-facing slopes, and from 700 to 1,600 metres (2,300 to 5,200 ft) elevation on the south-facing slopes.

Laurissilva is characterized by evergreen trees with glossy leaves, and trees in the laurel family (Lauraceae) are prominent. The laurissilva is similar to the ancient subtropical forests of the Mediterranean Basin, prior to its climate cooling and drying during the ice ages. The paleobotanical record of Madeira reveals that laurissilva forests has existed in this island for at least 1.8 million years. The Canary Islands and Azores are home to smaller areas of laurissilva.

The laurissilva of Madeira is of two main types. Moist laurisilva is found on north-facing slopes and canyons. The predominant trees are Laurus novocanariensis, Ocotea foetens, Persea indica, and Clethra arborea. Trees are covered with epiphytic mosses and lichens.

Dry laurisilva is found on south-facing slopes, and predominant trees are Persea barbujana, Laurus novocanariensis, Picconia excelsa, Visnea mocanera, and Clethra arborea.

Other laurissilva plants include the trees Heberdenia excelsa, Laurus nobilis, Pittosporum coriaceum, and Rhamnus glandulosa, and the large shrubs Ilex perado and Ilex canariensis. The laurissilva has an understory of shrubs, ferns, herbs, mosses, and liverworts. Understory plants include the giant cranesbill Geranium maderense, the Madeiran squill (Scilla madeirensis), and the endemic orchids Dactylorhiza foliosa and Goodyera macrophylla.

Mountain heathland grows on the high ridges and mountains above the laurissilva. Characteristic shrubs are tree heath (Erica arborea), besom heath (Erica platycodon ssp. maderincola), and Madeira juniper (Juniperus cedrus).

Along the southern coast, low forests dominated by the endemic wild olive tree (Olea europaea subsp. cerasiformis) and the shrubs Maytenus umbellata, Chamaemeles coriacea (a Madeiran endemic), Dracaena draco, and Asparagus scoparius survive in coastal ravines up to 200 metres (660 ft) elevation. A secondary coastal shrubland of Euphorbia piscatoria, Echium nervosum. and Globularia salicina forms in disturbed areas. Low forests dominated by marmolano (Sideroxylon mirmulano) occur along the northern shore, and in pockets above the south shore Olea forests from 200 to 300 metres (660 to 980 ft) elevation. Other coastal plant communities include low shrubland, perennial grassland, and annual grassland.

== Fauna ==
The laurissilva forests of the island of Madeira have been recognised as an Important Bird Area (IBA) by BirdLife International. Some 295 bird species and subspecies have been recorded on the Islands, and 42 of them breed here. Endemic bird species include the Trocaz pigeon (Columba trocaz), Zino's petrel (Pterodroma madeira), Desertas petrel (Pterodroma deserta), and Madeira firecrest (Regulus maderensis). The Madeira chaffinch (Fringilla madeirensis) is an endemic forest species related to the Eurasian chaffinch. Berthelot's pipit (Anthus bertheloti) and Atlantic canary (Serinus canaria) are Macaronesian endemics. Tyto alba schmitzi is a Madeiran subspecies of Western barn owl, Accipiter nisus granti is a Macaronesian subspecies of Eurasian sparrowhawk, and Falco tinnunculus canariensis is a Macaronesian subspecies of common kestrel. The plain swift (Apus unicolor) breeds on Madeira and the Canary Islands, and ranges over northwestern Africa. Two extinct species of rail, the Madeira rail (Rallus lowei) and Porto Santo rail (Rallus adolfocaesaris), once inhabited the archipelago, on Madeira and Porto Santo islands respectively.

Zino's petrel is a Madeiran breeding endemic, and the Desertas petrel breeds only on the Desertas islands. Other seabirds include the Madeiran storm petrel (Oceanodroma castro), Fea's petrel (Pterodroma feae), little shearwater (Puffinus assimilis baroli), white-faced storm petrel (Pelagodroma marina hypoleuca), and yellow-legged gull (Larus michahellis). Regular visitors include the little egret (Egretta garzetta), cattle egret (Bubulcus ibis), Eurasian whimbrel (Numenius phaeopus), dunlin (Calidris alpina), and ruddy turnstone (Arenaria interpres).

Two bats inhabit the islands – the Madeira pipistrelle (Pipistrellus maderensis), a Macaronesian endemic, and a subspecies of lesser noctule (Nyctalus leisleri verrucosus).

The islands have two endemic lizards. The Madeiran wall lizard (Teira dugesii) lives on Madeira, Porto Santo, the Desertas, and the Selvagens.

The islands have over 500 terrestrial invertebrate species, including insects, spiders, and molluscs.

== Human impacts ==
Portuguese settlers arrived after 1420, and are the first known settlers. The islands' trees were cut for their timber, and Persea indica was the most sought after. In the 16th and 17th centuries the southern side of Madeira was converted to sugarcane plantations. A system of levadas, water channels 80 to 150 centimetres (31 to 59 in) wide, was constructed of stone and later concrete to irrigate the sugarcane fields. Forests and shrublands were denuded to provide charcoal for the islands' sugar mills. Goats, sheep, and cows were introduced to the islands, and forests were converted to pasture land, and the forest understory was grazed intensively.

Many exotic plants and animals have been introduced to the islands. A few are invasive. Plantations of Pinus pinaster and Eucalyptus globulus were planted at middle elevations. Eucalyptus has spread extensively on the south slope of Madeira, displacing native species.

== Conservation and protected areas ==
Laurisilva of Madeira
UNESCO World Heritage Site
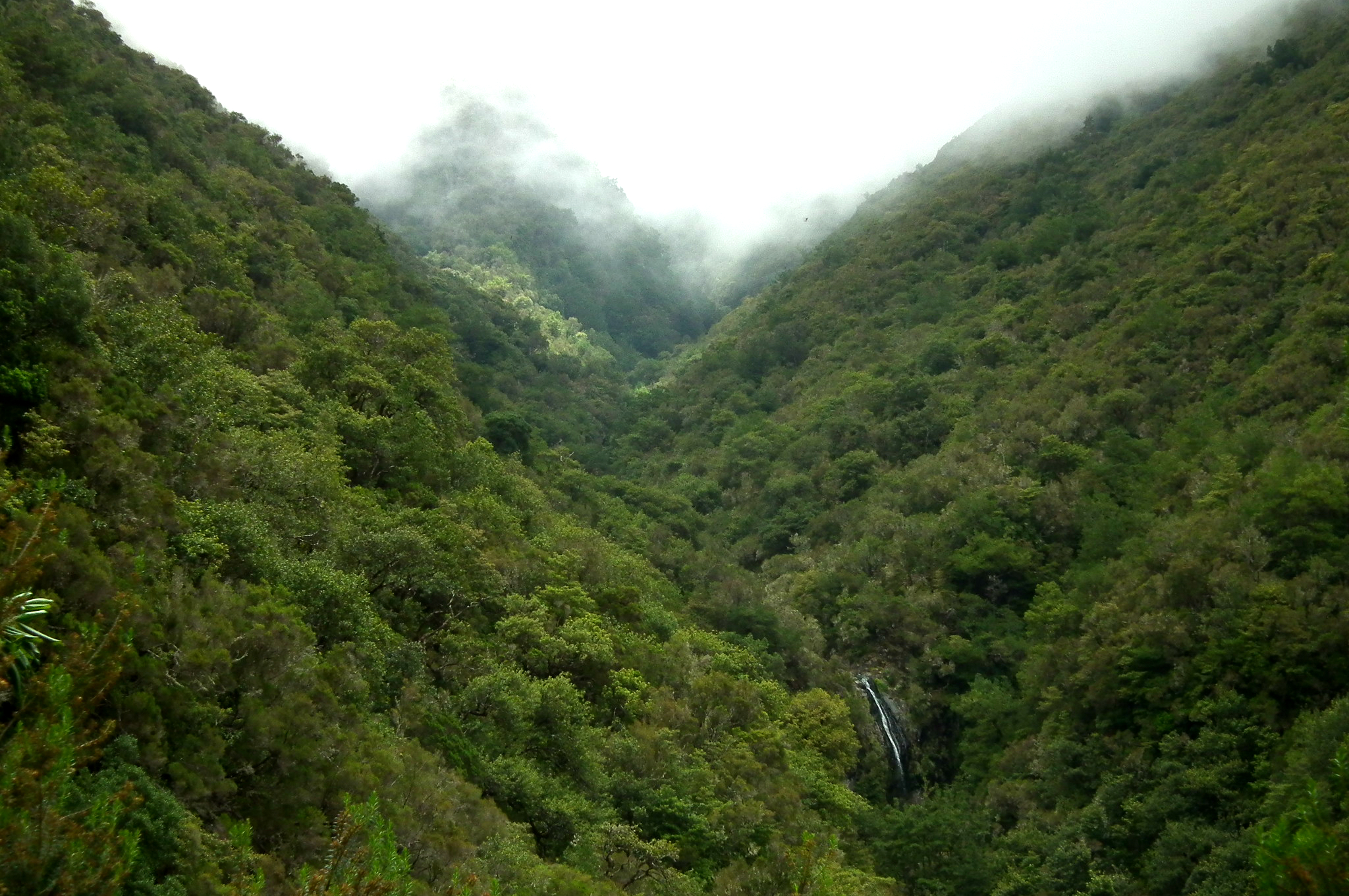
- Prehistoric Laurisilva forest in Madeira
- Interactive map of Laurisilva of Madeira
- Location: Island of Madeira, Madeira, Portugal
- Criteria: Natural: (ix)(x)
- Reference: 934
- Inscription: 1999 (23rd Session)
- Area: 15,000 ha (58 sq mi)
- Coordinates: 32°46′N 17°0′W

Approximately 15,000 hectares (37,000 acres) of laurissilva remain on Madeira, mostly on the northern side of the island. 90% of the laurissilva is primary forest, and includes trees up to 800 years old that predate settlement of the islands. The remaining 10% is secondary growth in areas that were last cut during the mid-20th century.

483 square kilometres (186 sq mi) (60%) of the ecoregion is in protected areas. Madeira Natural Park, established in 1982, protects an area of 444 square kilometres (171 sq mi), covering most of Madeira including the island's remaining laurissilva forests. From the 1980s goats and sheep were removed from the forests and the non-forested areas of the park, which has allowed the forest understory and shrublands to recover.

The Madeira Islands laurel forest was designated a World Heritage Site by UNESCO in 1999, covering an area of 150 square kilometres (58 sq mi). It is believed to be 90% primordial forest. The paleobotanical record of the island of Madeira reveals that the laurel forest existed on this island at least 1.8 million years ago.

UNESCO justified the inclusion of this place within the world heritage precisely because it is the largest remaining laurel forest, in the past spread throughout Europe while today is practically extinct. In addition, this type of forest is considered a center of plant biodiversity and contains numerous endemic, residual and rare species, especially bryophytes, ferns and flowering plants. It also has a very rich invertebrate fauna, appearing among the endemic species of the island, the Madeira laurel pigeon.

The Selvagens were made a nature reserve in 1971, and the Desertas in 1990.

== Gallery ==
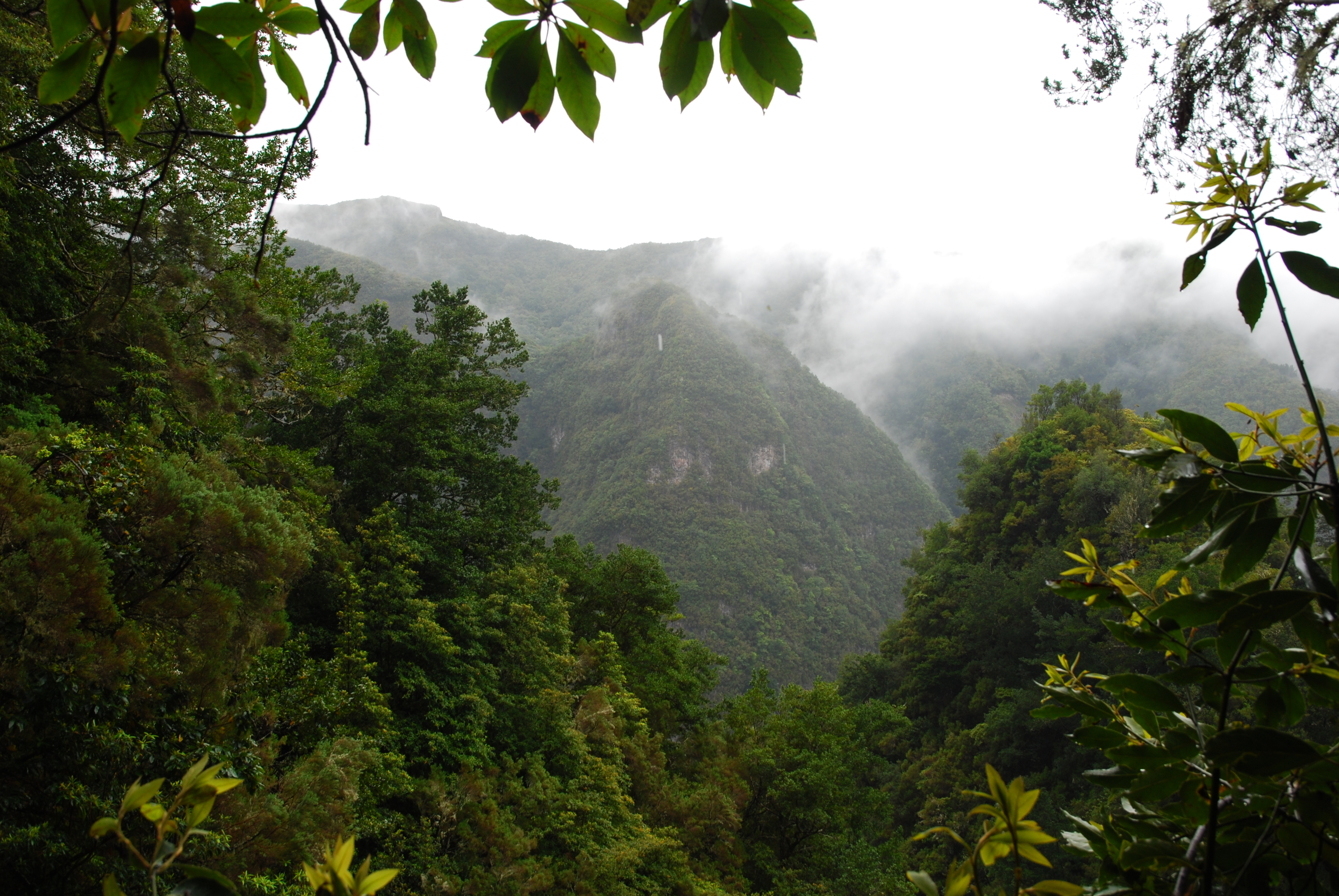
Laurisilva of Madeira

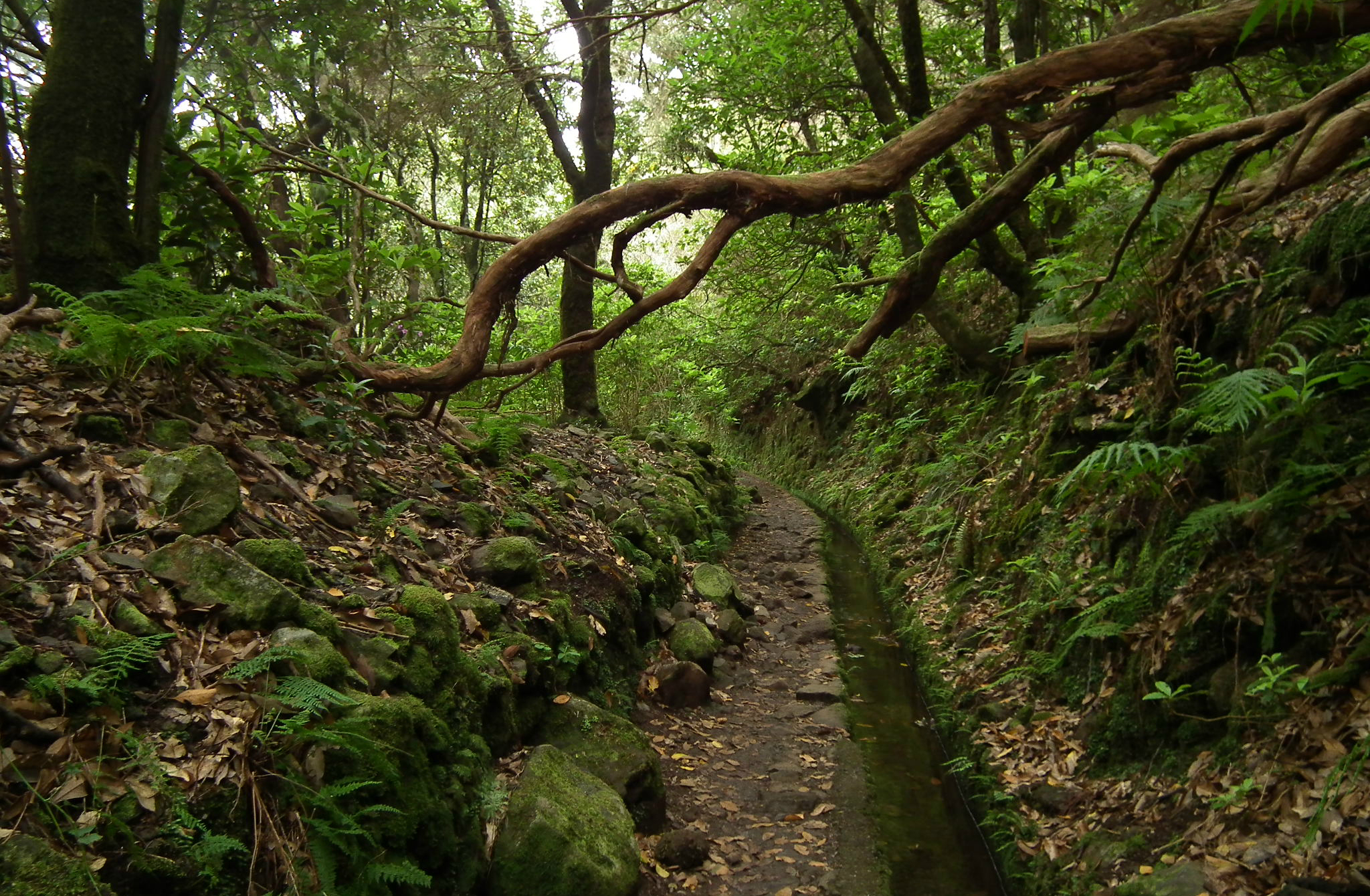
Old passage in the laurel forest

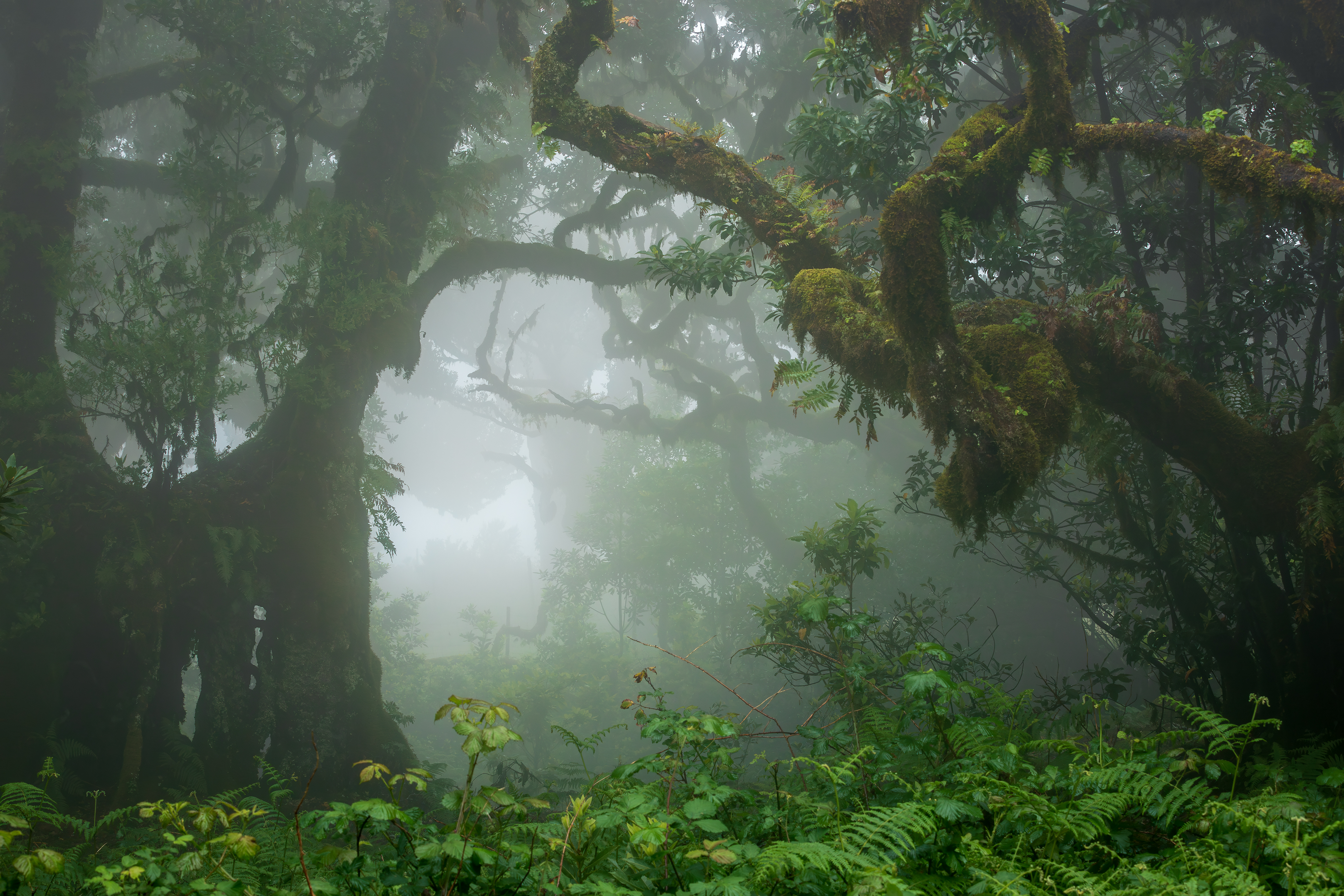
Foggy Fanal forest in Seixal
