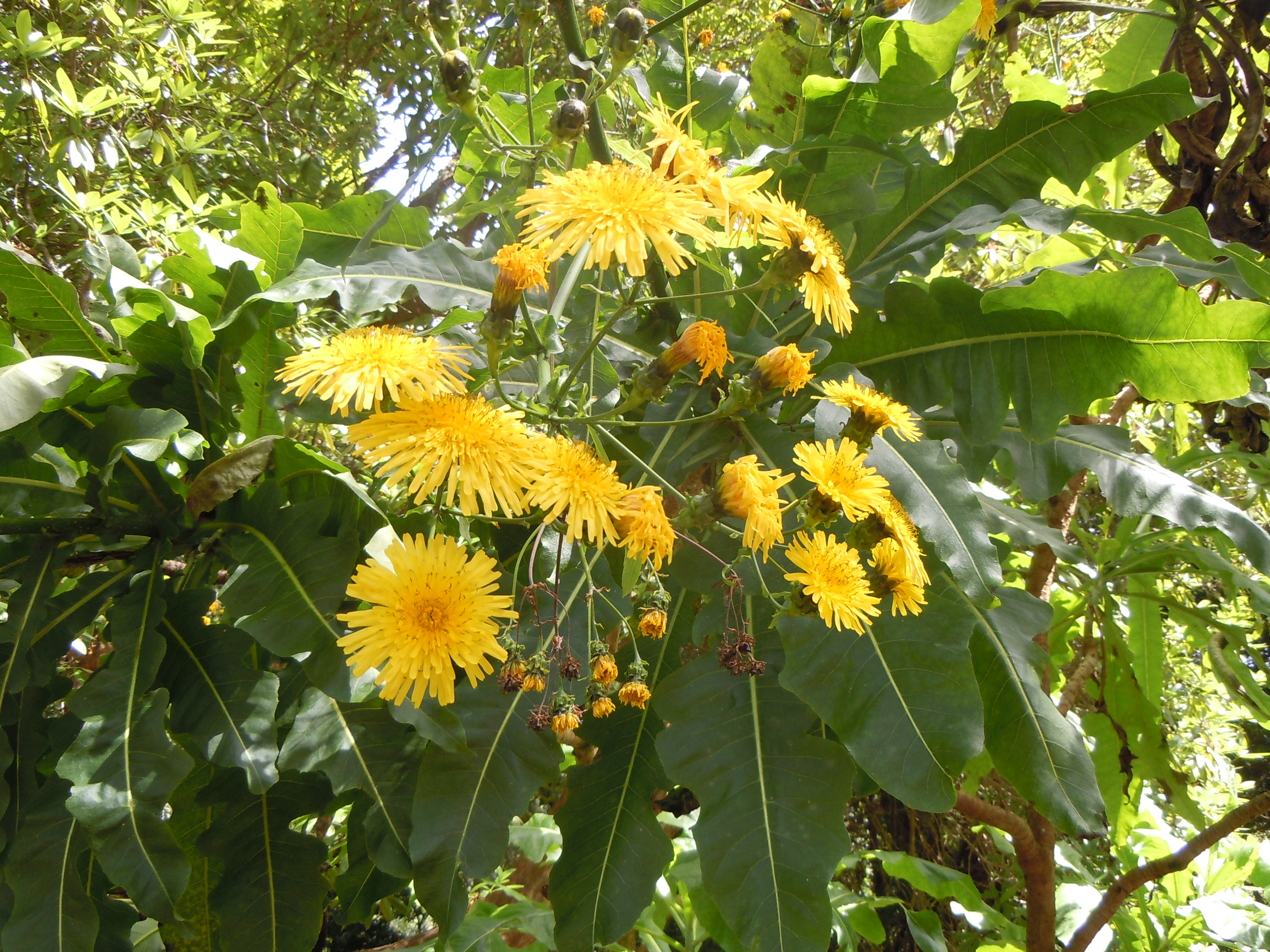
- Inflorescence

Scientific classification
- Kingdom: Plantae
- Clade: Tracheophytes
- Clade: Angiosperms
- Clade: Eudicots
- Clade: Asterids
- Order: Asterales
- Family: Asteraceae
- Genus: Sonchus
- Species: S. fruticosus

Binomial name
- Sonchus fruticosus L.f. 1782

Synonyms
- Sonchus laevigatus Willd. Sonchus libycus Spach ex Boiss. Sonchus lyratus Willd. Sonchus squarrosus DC.

= Sonchus fruticosus =

Giant sow thistle

Species of plant

Sonchus fruticosus, the giant sow thistle, is a species of flowering plant in the tribe Cichorieae of the family Asteraceae. It is endemic to the islands of Madeira. The giant sow thistle is an impressive shrub native to the Madeiran evergreen forest habitat and growing up to 4 metres (13 feet) in height.

It is also known as the shrubby sonchus, the shrubby sow thistle, or the Madeiran tree dandelion in English. On Madeira, it is known by the Portuguese vernacular names Leituga, língua de vaca, and serralha da rocha. The term leituga refers to a broad variety of plants, including prickly lettuce (Lactuca serriola) and cat's ear (Hypochaeris glabra).

== Description ==
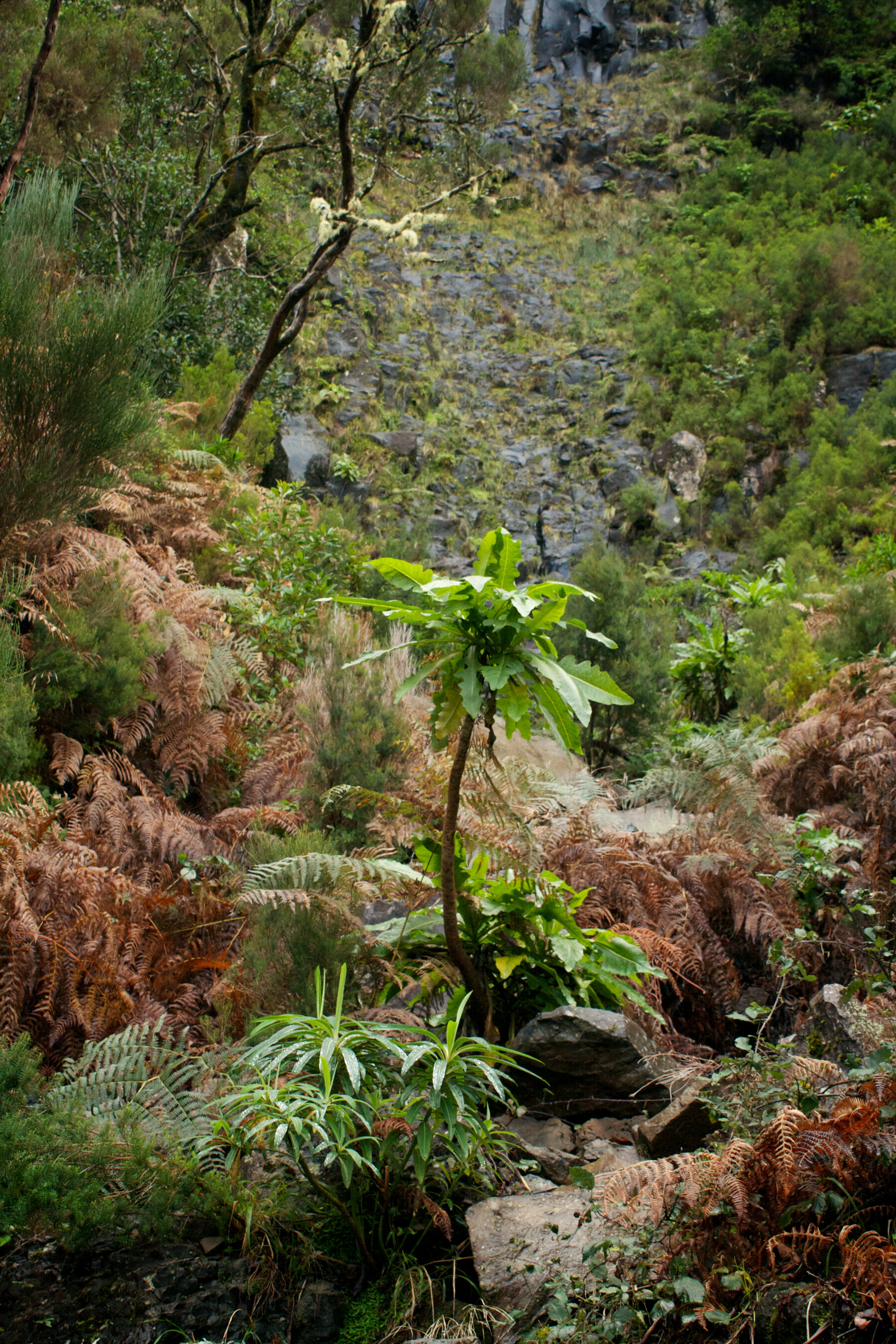
Sonchus fruticosus growing in context in Madeira

Sonchus fruticosus is a perennial plant, with some descriptions putting the giant sow thistle as deciduous. It grows up to 6 feet (1.8 metres) in height, and some reports putting it at 4 metres (13 feet). with a woody trunk. Its growing habit is that of a subshrub. It is a partial evergreen in its native habitat, and loses its leaves during the winter elsewhere. It is found at an elevation of 800 meters to 1200 meters. It takes 2 to 5 years to grow to its peak height, with some report putting this value at 20 to 50 years. Due to its bizarre appearance, resembling that of a giant dandelion, S. fruticosus is often grown as attractions at gardens and parks, especially in Western European botanical gardens. In addition, it is one of the few perennial plants and shrubs within the genus Sonchus. It is part of a group of giant sowthistles found in the Macaronesian region within the subgenus Dendrosonchus; such as: Sonchus acaulis, Sonchus arboreus, Sonchus canariensis, Sonchus congestus, Sonchus hierrense, and Sonchus palmensis.

The giant sow thistle has glossy toothed green leaves, with denticulate margin, sinuate, and long, growing to a length of 50 centimetres (1.6 feet) and arranged in a rosette. The rosette grows to a width of 0.5 metres (1.6 feet) to 1 metre (3.3 feet).

It flowers during the summer, during the months of June, July, and August, with yellow flowers that resemble dandelions. The flowers are attractive to bees, butterflies, and birds. The seeds are wind dispersed.

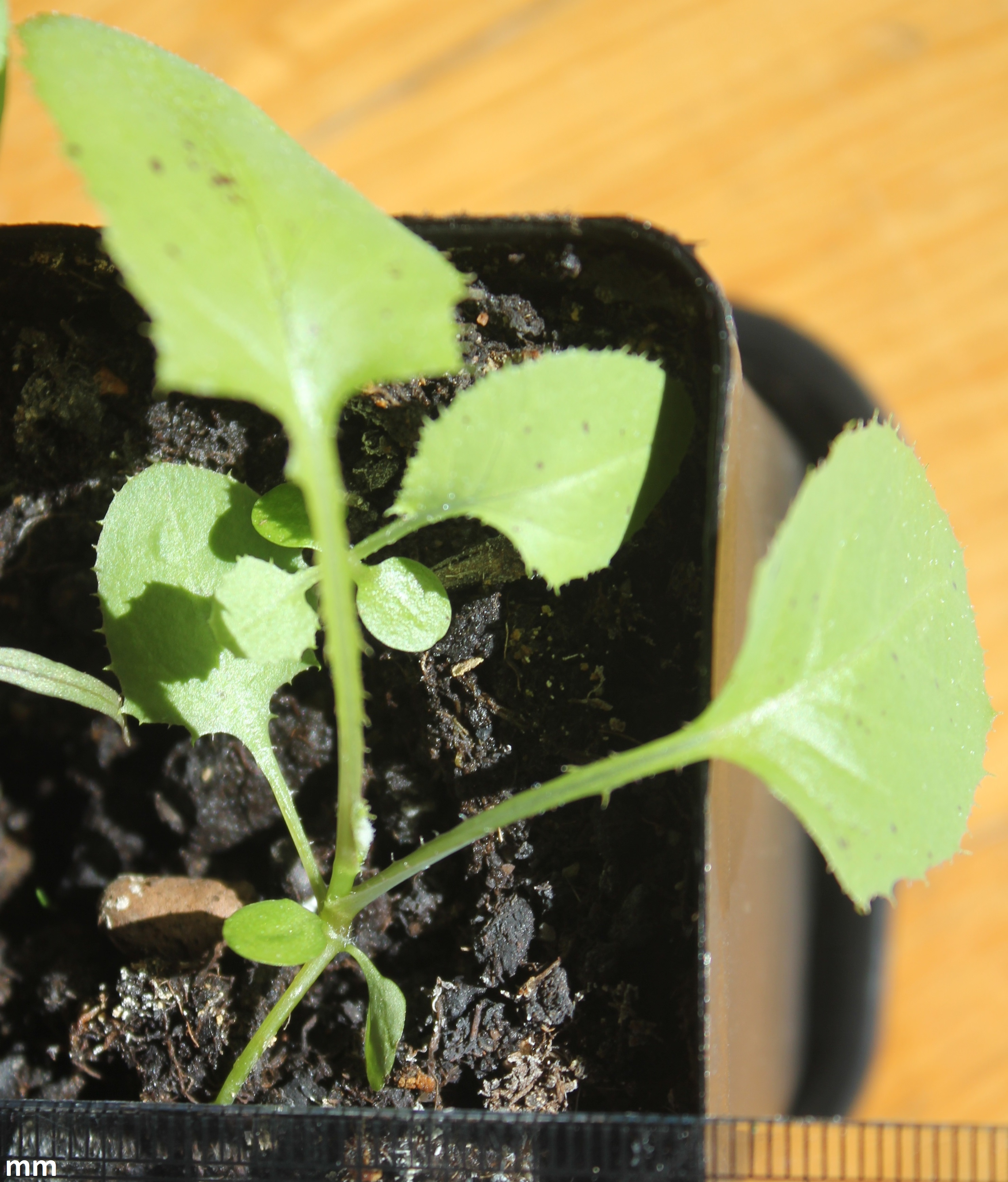
Sonchus fruticosus seedlings

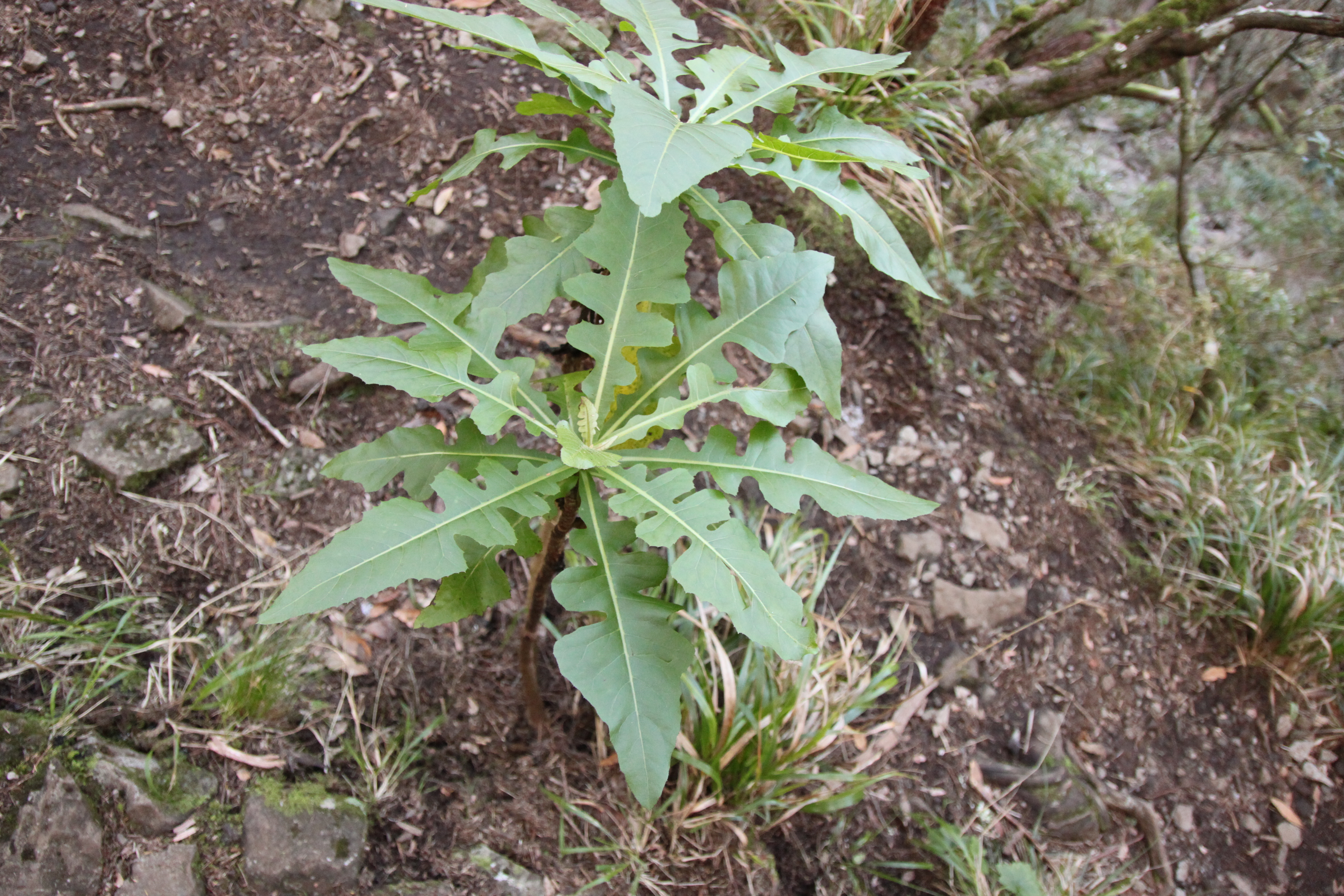
Detail of leaves

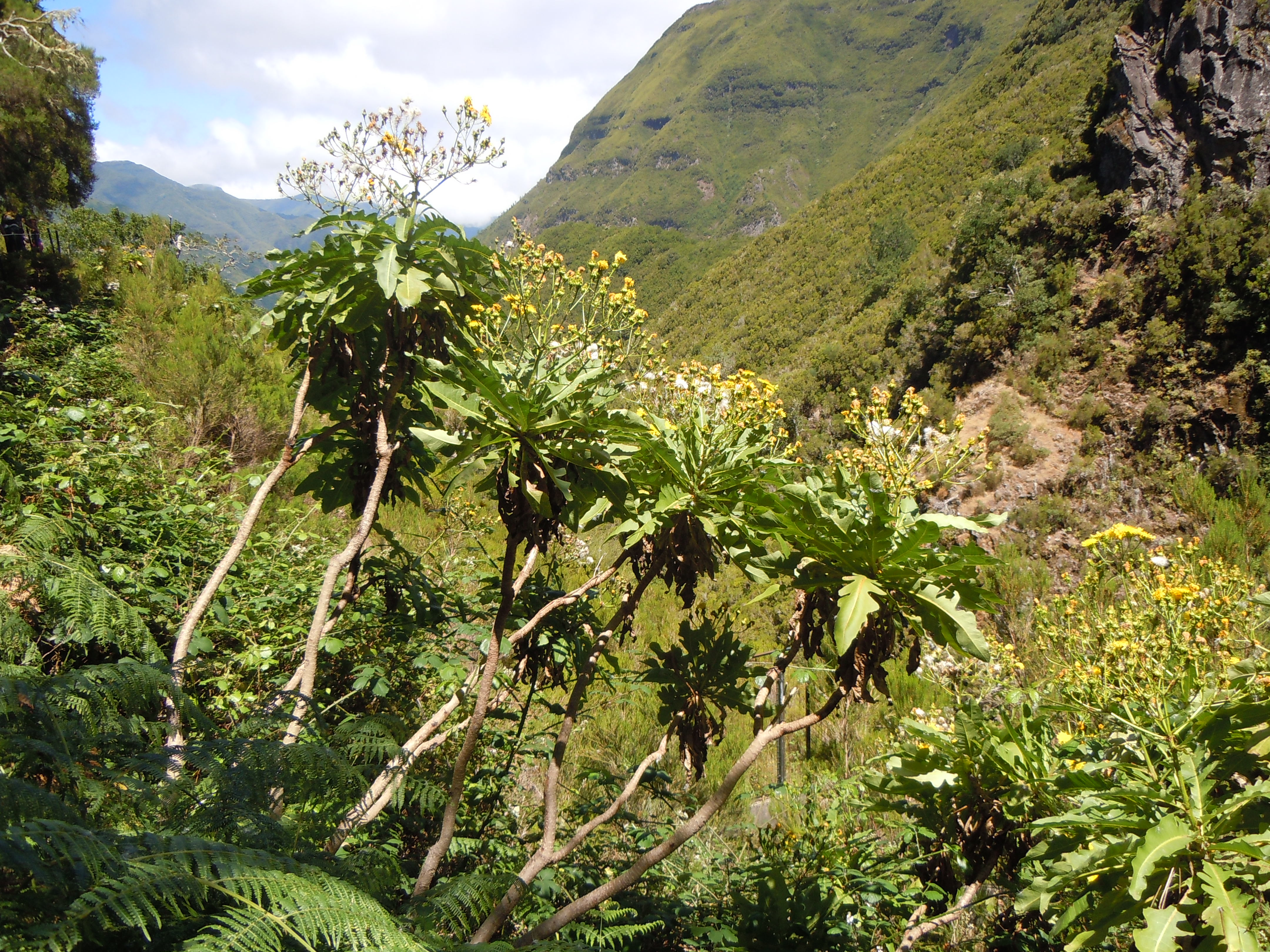
Growing in context at Levada das 25 Fontes

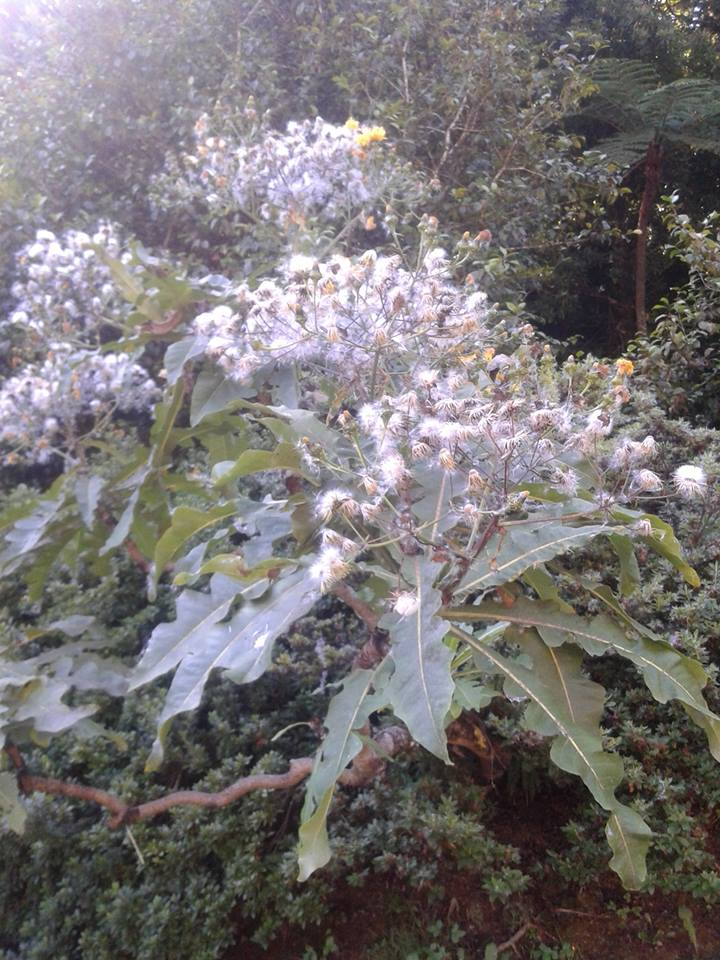
Infructescence

=== Care ===
The giant sow thistle requires direct sunlight or partial shade. It requires regular or little watering, but prefers moist soil. The giant sow thistle is drought tolerant. It generally requires average, well drained soil, and free-draining, loam-based compost. The recommended pH is between 5.5 and 8.5. It prefers chalky, loamy, or sandy soil. It prefers a garden aspect facing south, east, or west. Its UK hardiness zone is H3 (tender in frost) and H1 (indoor heated), its USDA hardiness zone is 9a, 9b, 10a, 10b, and 11.

It is an outdoors plant during the summer, and is recommended to be overwintered indoors. If planted outdoors, the plant can survive a frost, with the top growth being shed while the roots survive. However, roots cannot survive freezing. It is generally pest and disease free. However vagrant populations of the aphid Uroleucon mierae and the leafhopper Empoasca fabalis are known to feed on the flowers and leaves respectively. The giant sow thistle does not require pruning, with leaves being trimmed off if necessary.

To propagate seeds, it is recommended to sow during the spring or summer, during the months of April and May, with a minimum outdoor temperature of 25 degrees Celsius (77 degrees Fahrenheit). If propagating during winter, sow in vented containers, coldframe, or an unheated greenhouse. It is recommended to sow indoors or directly before the last frost. To collect the seeds, bag the seedheads to capture the ripe seeds. The plant can self-sow, with deadheading recommended if one does not want volunteer seedlings. It can be propagated by root cuttings, seeds, herbaceous stem cuttings, softwood cuttings, and by air layering.

== Distribution ==
The giant sow thistle is found on the islands of Madeira. Where it grows within the Northern laurisilva cloud forest habitat within Madeira, at an elevation of 800-1200 meters. There have been reports of giant sow thistles on the island of Porto Santo, where it is rare.

There are additional, albeit unreliable, records of S. fruticosus being found on the Canary Islands. However it is doubtful that the plant is native to the Canary Islands.

== See also ==
- Island endemism
- Island gigantism
