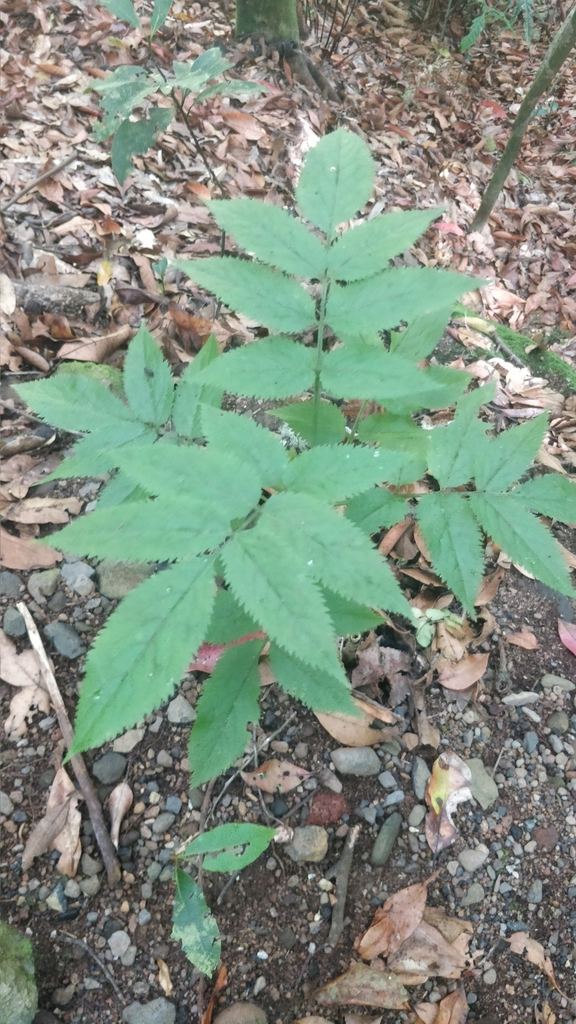

Conservation status
- Vulnerable (IUCN 3.1)

Scientific classification
- Kingdom: Plantae
- Clade: Tracheophytes
- Clade: Angiosperms
- Clade: Eudicots
- Clade: Asterids
- Order: Dipsacales
- Family: Adoxaceae
- Genus: Sambucus
- Species: S. lanceolata

Binomial name
- Sambucus lanceolata Banks ex Lowe

= Sambucus lanceolata =

Species of flowering plant

Sambucus lanceolata is a species of elderberry endemic to Madeira Island in the eastern Atlantic Ocean. The common name in English is Madeira elder.

Sambucus lanceolata Banks ex Lowe, Trans. Cambridge Philos. Soc. 4: 31 1831.
