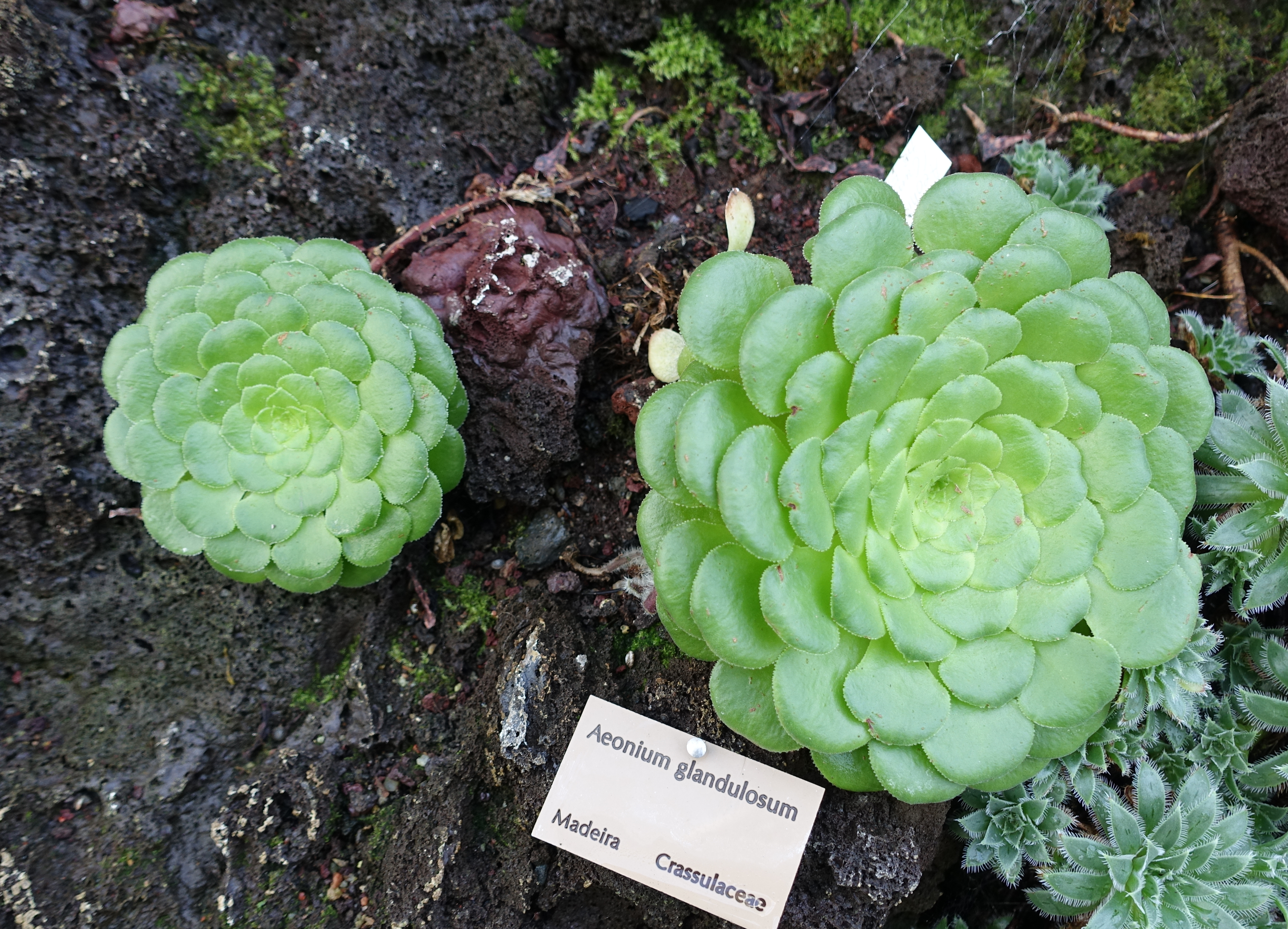
- Specimen in Bergianska trädgården

Scientific classification
- Kingdom: Plantae
- Clade: Tracheophytes
- Clade: Angiosperms
- Clade: Eudicots
- Order: Saxifragales
- Family: Crassulaceae
- Genus: Aeonium
- Species: A. glandulosum

Binomial name
- Aeonium glandulosum (Aiton) Webb & Berthel.

Synonyms
- Aeonium meyerheimii Bolle; Sempervivum glandulosum Ait. (1852); Sempervivum meyerheimii (Bolle) Murray; Sempervivum patina Lowe

= Aeonium glandulosum =

Species of plant

Aeonium glandulosum is a species of subshrub of the family Crassulaceae endemic to the Madeira archipelago (Madeira Island, Porto Santo Island and Desertas Islands).

== Description ==
It is a biennial or perennial glandular-pubescent sub-shrub with a very short stem, hidden by the leaves, occasionally stoloniferous. It has rosette-shaped leaves, flat and plate-like but becomes centrally dome-shaped when the flowering season approaches, 30 centimetres (12 in) in diameter. It has loose inflorescences, 30 by 45 centimetres (12 in × 18 in) with 3–19 millimetres (0.12–0.75 in) pedicels that become distally curved. Petals are 7–10 millimetres (0.28–0.39 in), pale yellow and occasionally tinged with red.

== Distribution ==
The species is endemic to Madeira Island, Porto Santo Island, Desertas Islands and Bugio Island and is commonly found on sea cliffs in northern shores or rocky peaks from sea level up to 700 metres (2,300 ft) in altitude.

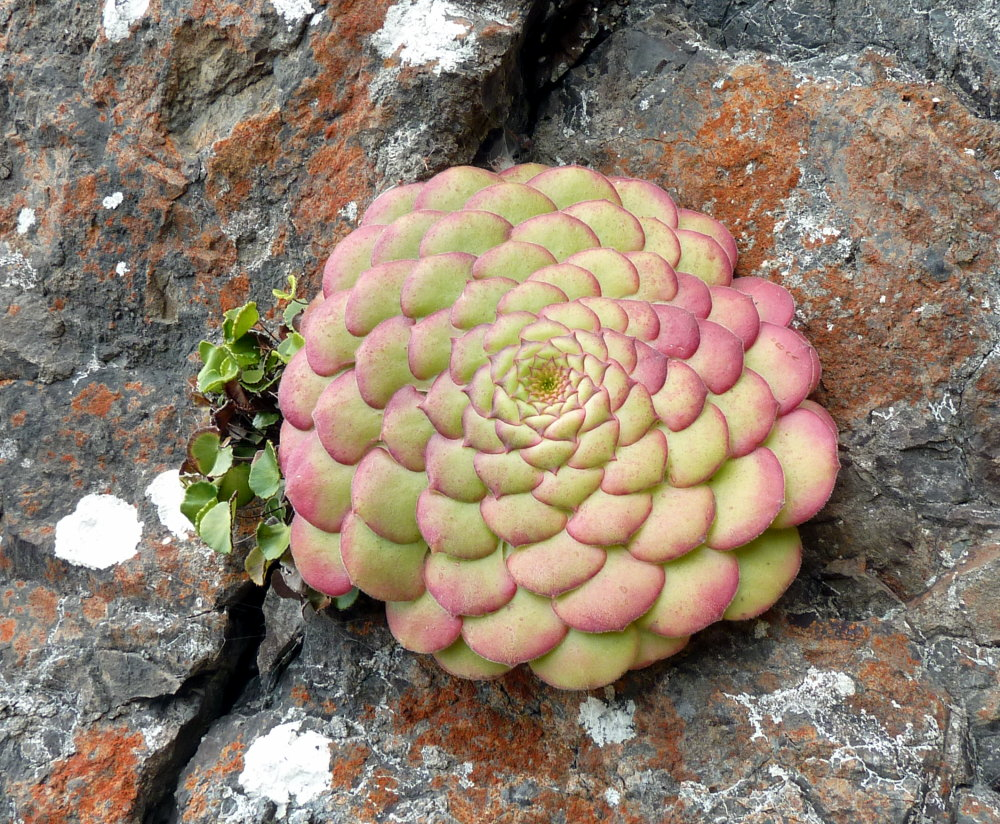

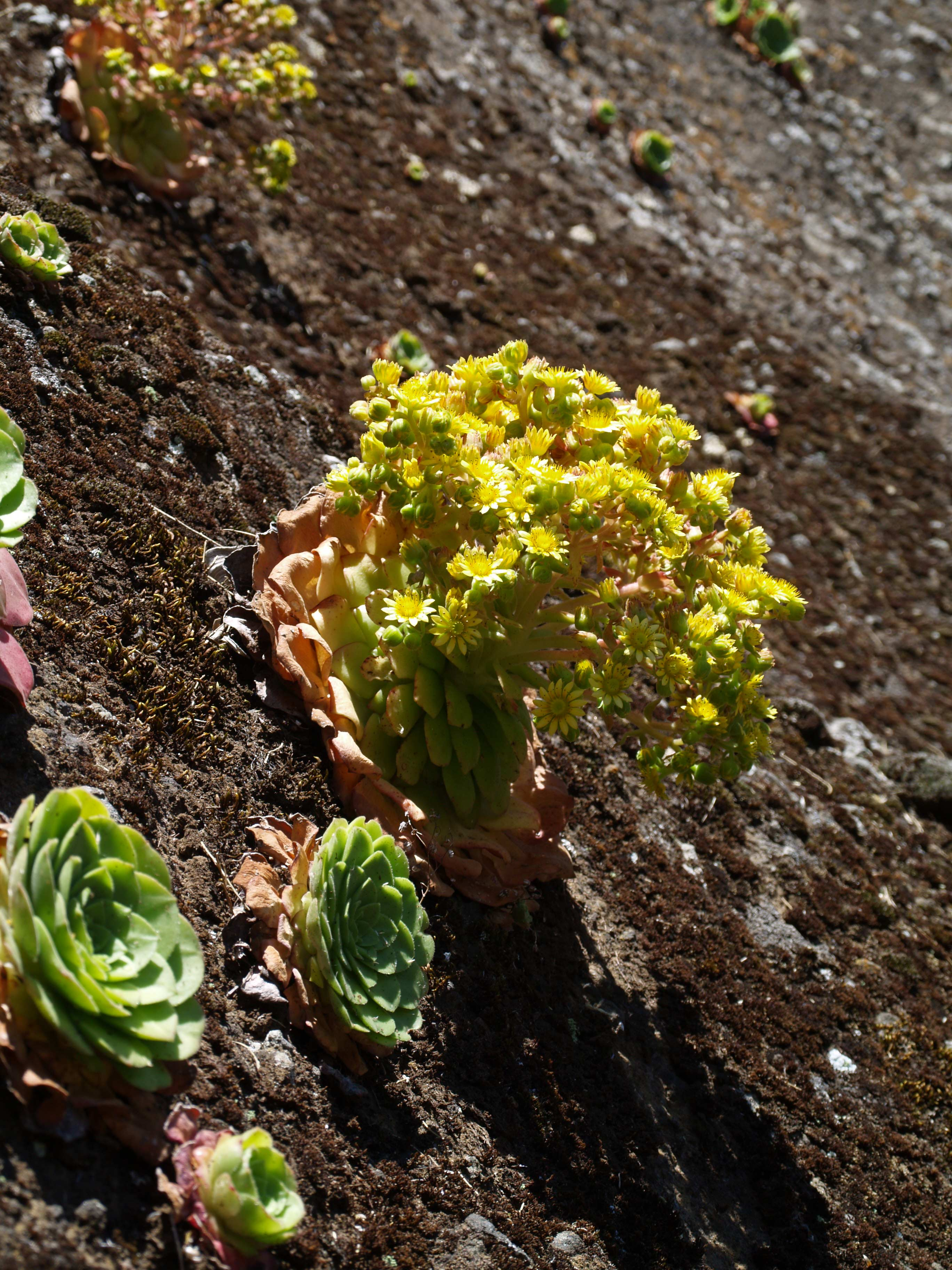
Inflorescence

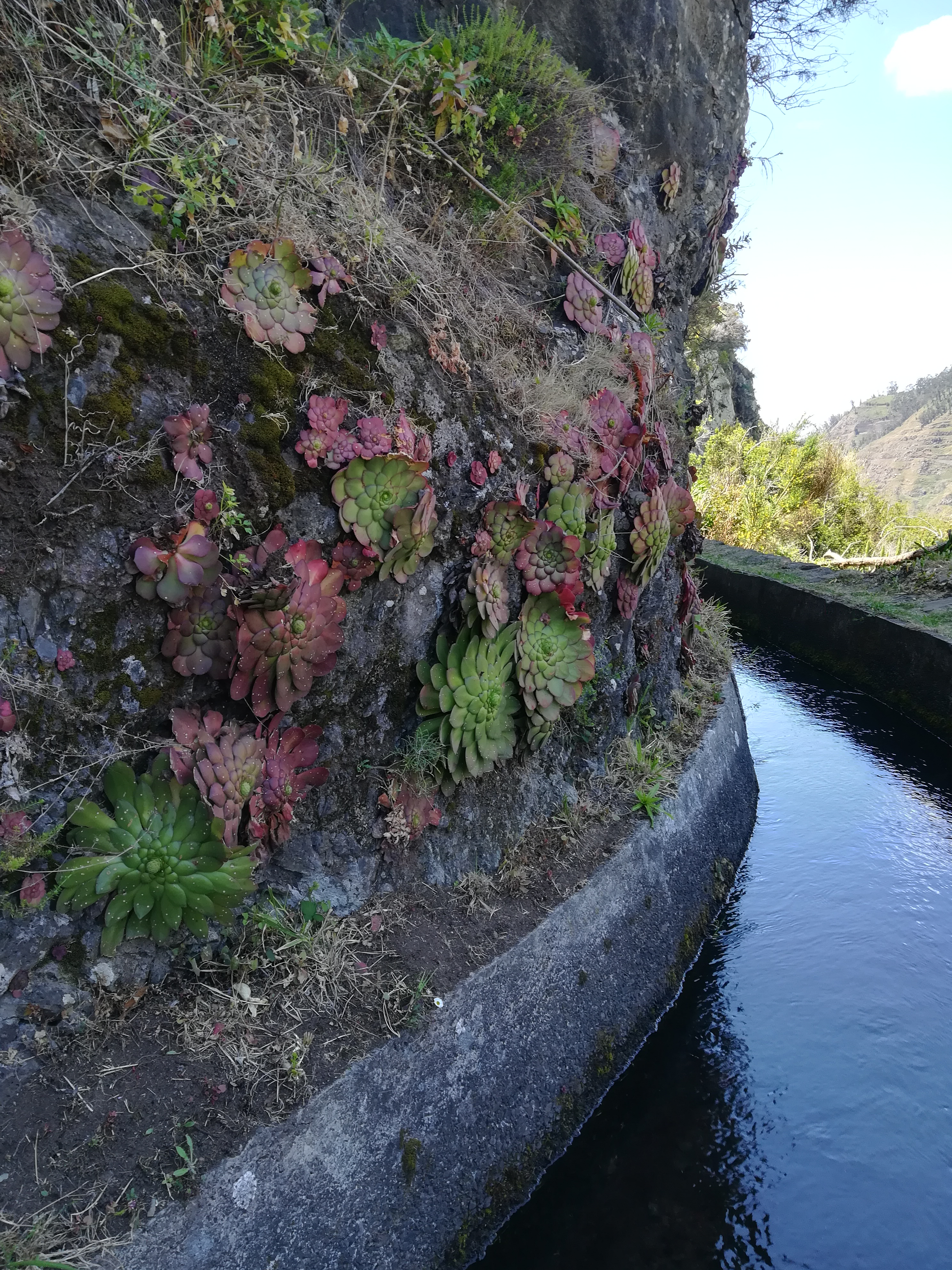
Aeonium glandulosum on a Levada

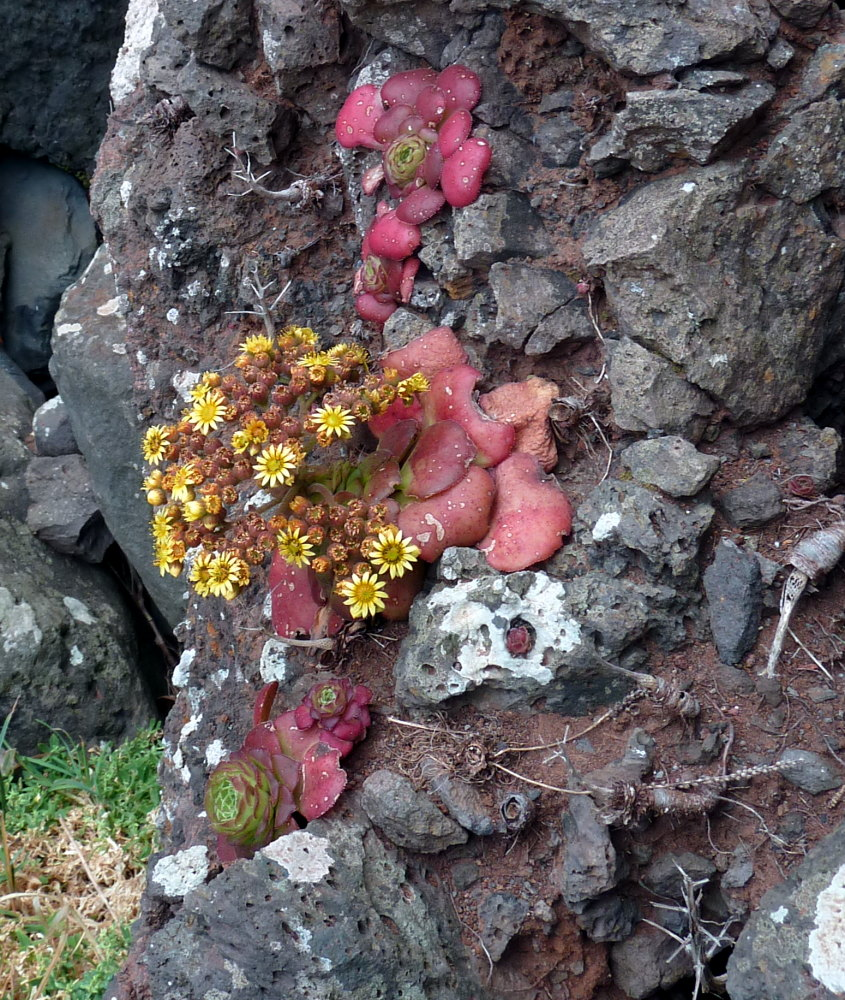
