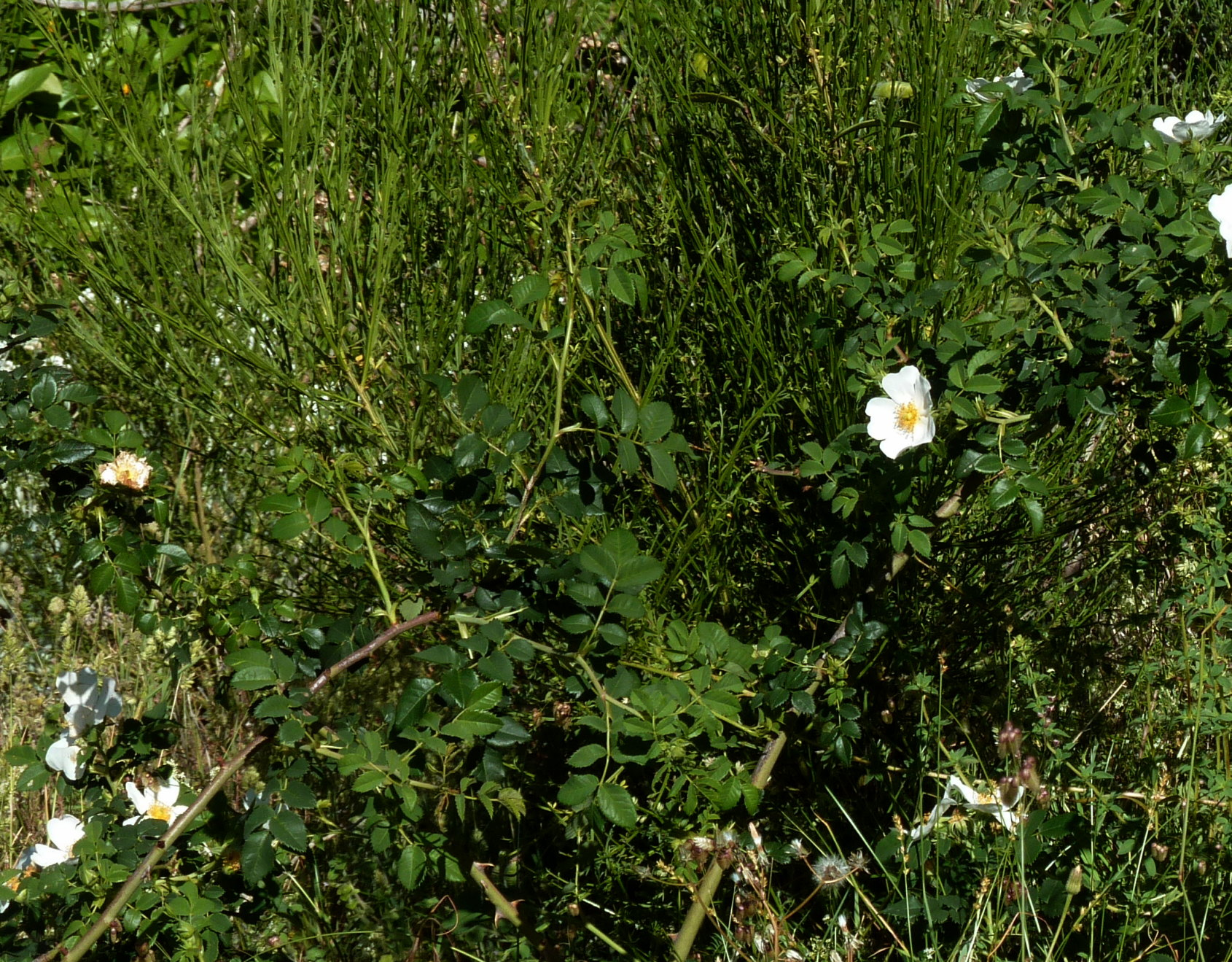
- In a thicket

Scientific classification
- Kingdom: Plantae
- Clade: Tracheophytes
- Clade: Angiosperms
- Clade: Eudicots
- Clade: Rosids
- Order: Rosales
- Family: Rosaceae
- Genus: Rosa
- Species: R. mandonii

Binomial name
- Rosa mandonii Déségl.

Synonyms
- Rosa canina var. mandonii (Déségl.) Menezes

= Rosa mandonii =

Species of plant

Rosa mandonii is a species of flowering plant in the family Rosaceae, native to Madeira. Some authorities consider it to be indistinguishable from Rosa canina, the dog rose. It is most often found in the laurisilva, but can also occur in other types of woodland and in thickets.
