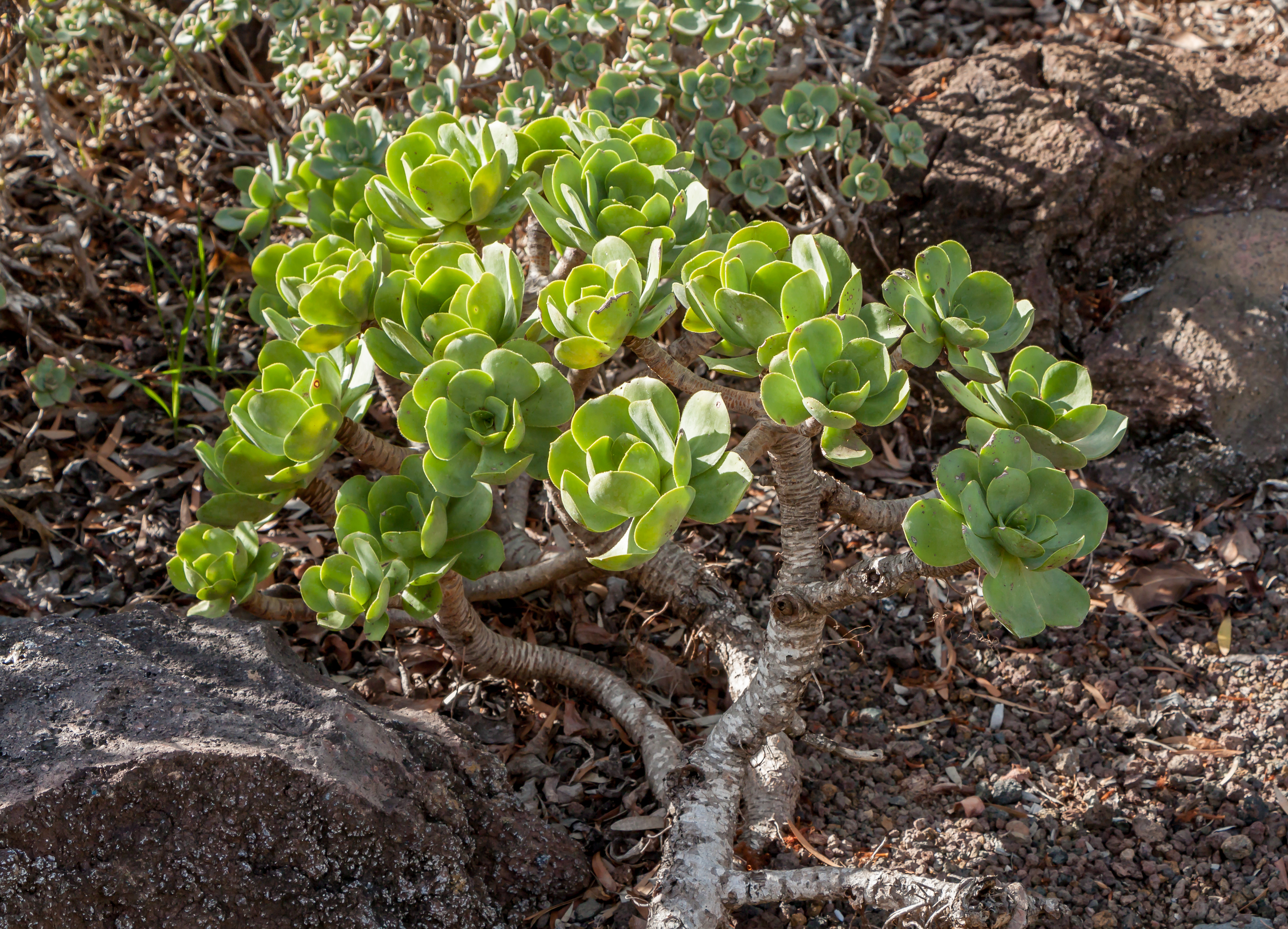

Scientific classification
- Kingdom: Plantae
- Clade: Tracheophytes
- Clade: Angiosperms
- Clade: Eudicots
- Order: Saxifragales
- Family: Crassulaceae
- Genus: Aeonium
- Species: A. glutinosum

Binomial name
- Aeonium glutinosum Webb & Berthel.

Synonyms
- Sempervivum glutinosum Aiton

= Aeonium glutinosum =

Species of succulent

Aeonium glutinosum is a species of flowering plant in the family Crassulaceae endemic to Madeira, Portugal. It has fairly thick leaves and its appearance varies depending on its growing conditions. One characteristic is the very sticky stem of the inflorescence. The main flower is shown but small stalks with flowers continue to appear for several months.

== Description ==
It is a very viscous perennial sub-shrub, with a robust stem, branches up to 60 centimetres (24 in) decumbent or ascending, occasionally subsessile plants. Rosette-shaped leaves up to 22 centimetres (8.7 in) in diameter with loose, subtle young leaves. Leaves up to 12 by 5 centimetres (4.7 in × 2.0 in), yellowish-green, usually with brownish stripes near the apex, glabrous, ciliated margins with few or numerous thin single-celled hairs. Inflorescences very loose, remotely branched, up to 40 by 45 centimetres (16 in × 18 in) Petals 5–7 millimetres (0.20–0.28 in), golden yellow, usually with red stripes abaxially.

== Distribution ==
The species is endemic to Madeira Island and Deserta Grande Island part of the Madeira Archipelago.

== Gallery ==
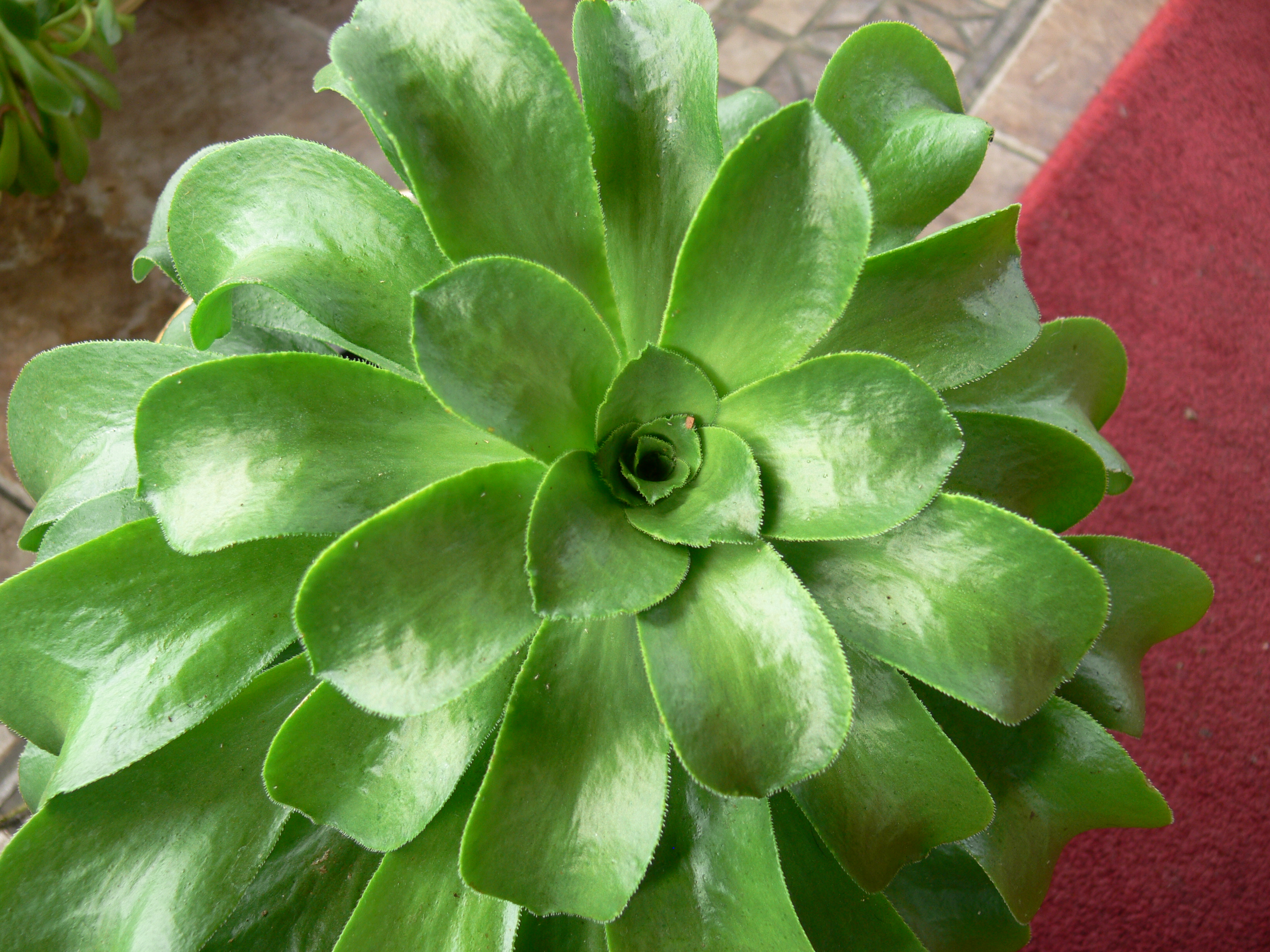

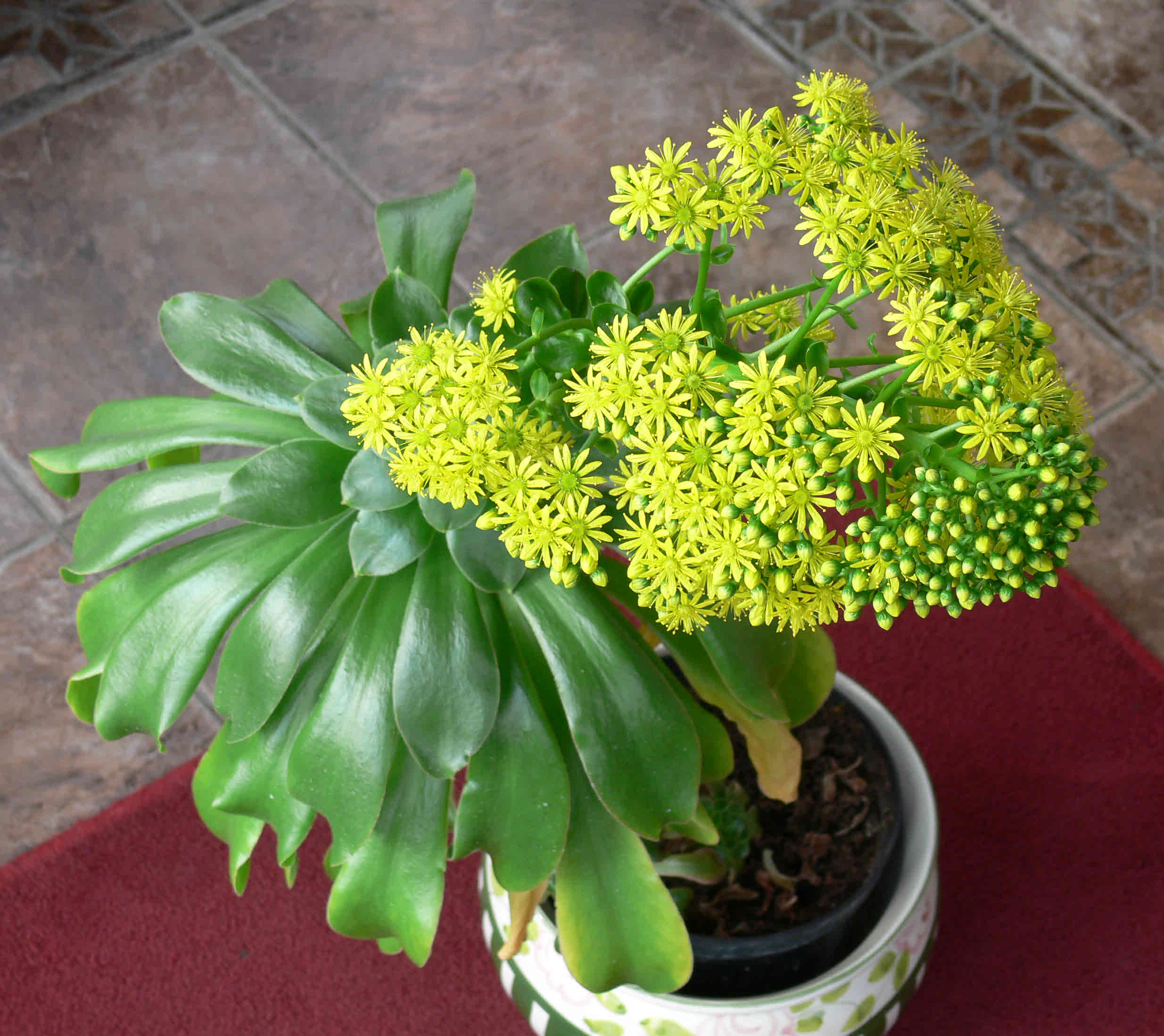

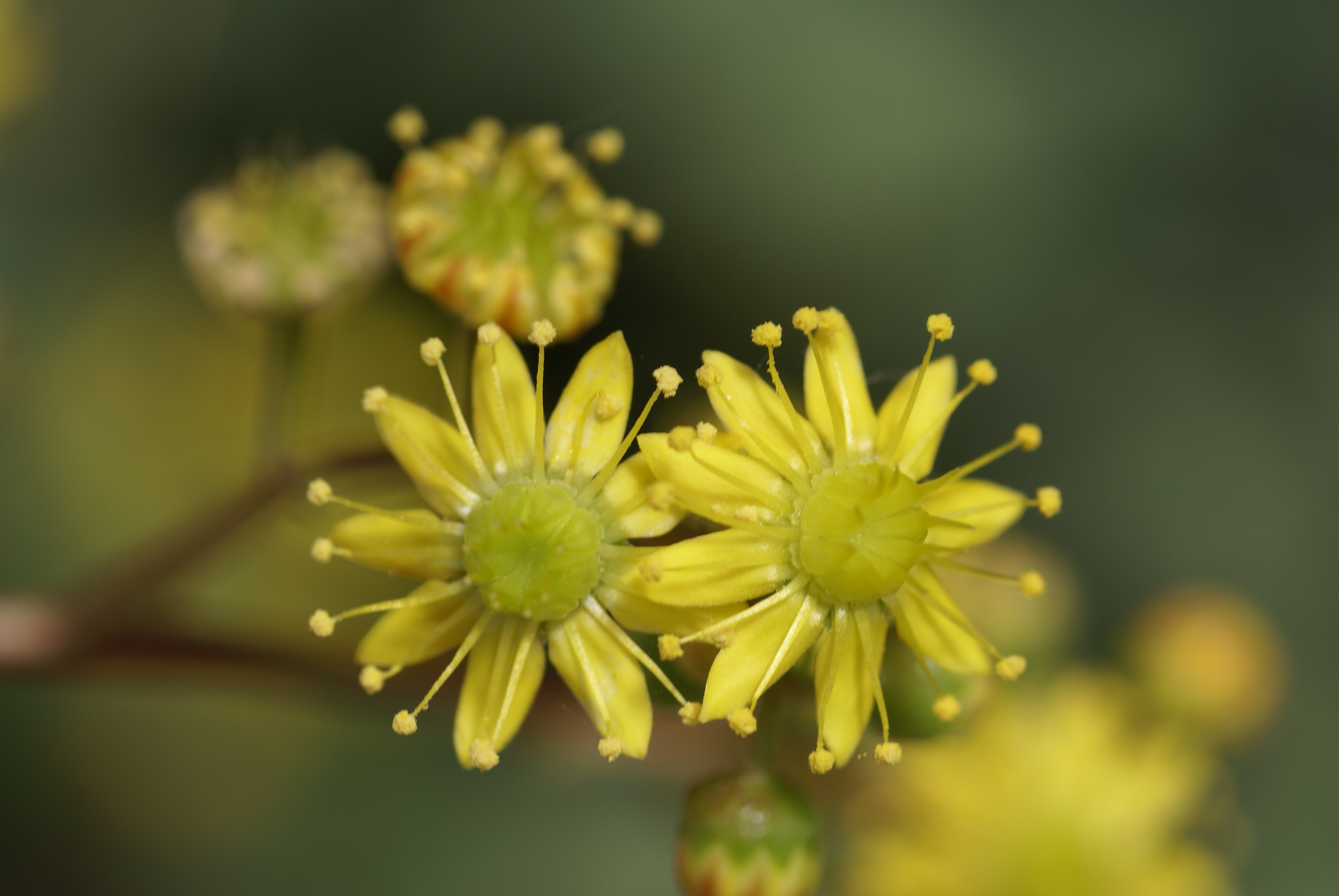
Flower close-up
