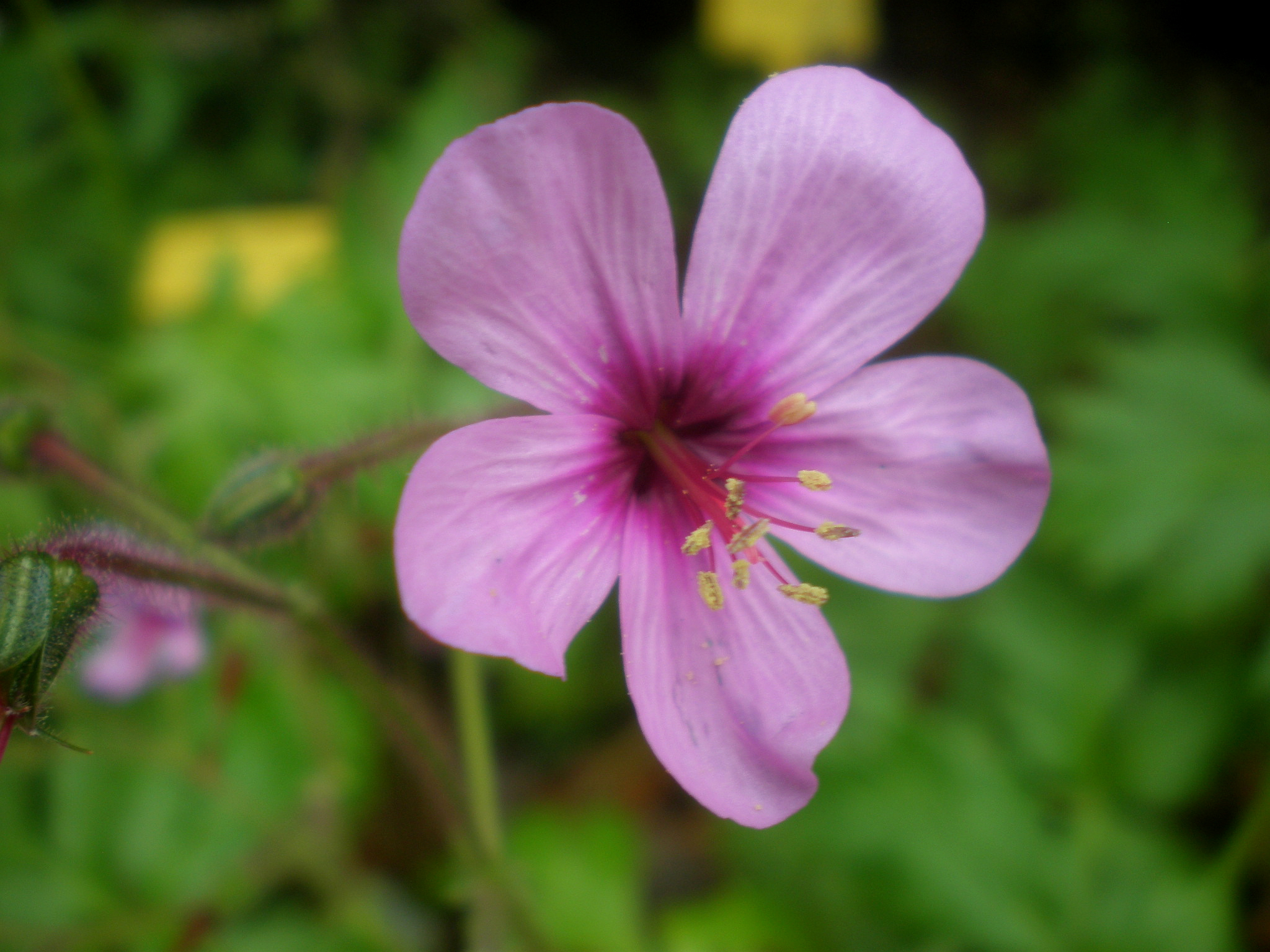

Scientific classification
- Kingdom: Plantae
- Clade: Tracheophytes
- Clade: Angiosperms
- Clade: Eudicots
- Clade: Rosids
- Order: Geraniales
- Family: Geraniaceae
- Genus: Geranium
- Species: G. palmatum

Binomial name
- Geranium palmatum Cav.

= Geranium palmatum =

Species of flowering plant

Geranium palmatum, falsely called Canary Island geranium, is a species of flowering plant in the family Geraniaceae, native to the island of Madeira. Growing in a rosette 1.5 m (4.9 ft) tall by 1 m (3.3 ft) broad, it is an evergreen perennial with divided palmate leaves and pink flowers 4 cm (1.6 in) in diameter on long red stems.

Hardy down to −10 °C (14 °F), in cultivation this plant requires a sheltered position in full sun with some afternoon shade. It dislikes heavy, wet soils, preferring a light, well-drained medium. It has won the Royal Horticultural Society's Award of Garden Merit.
