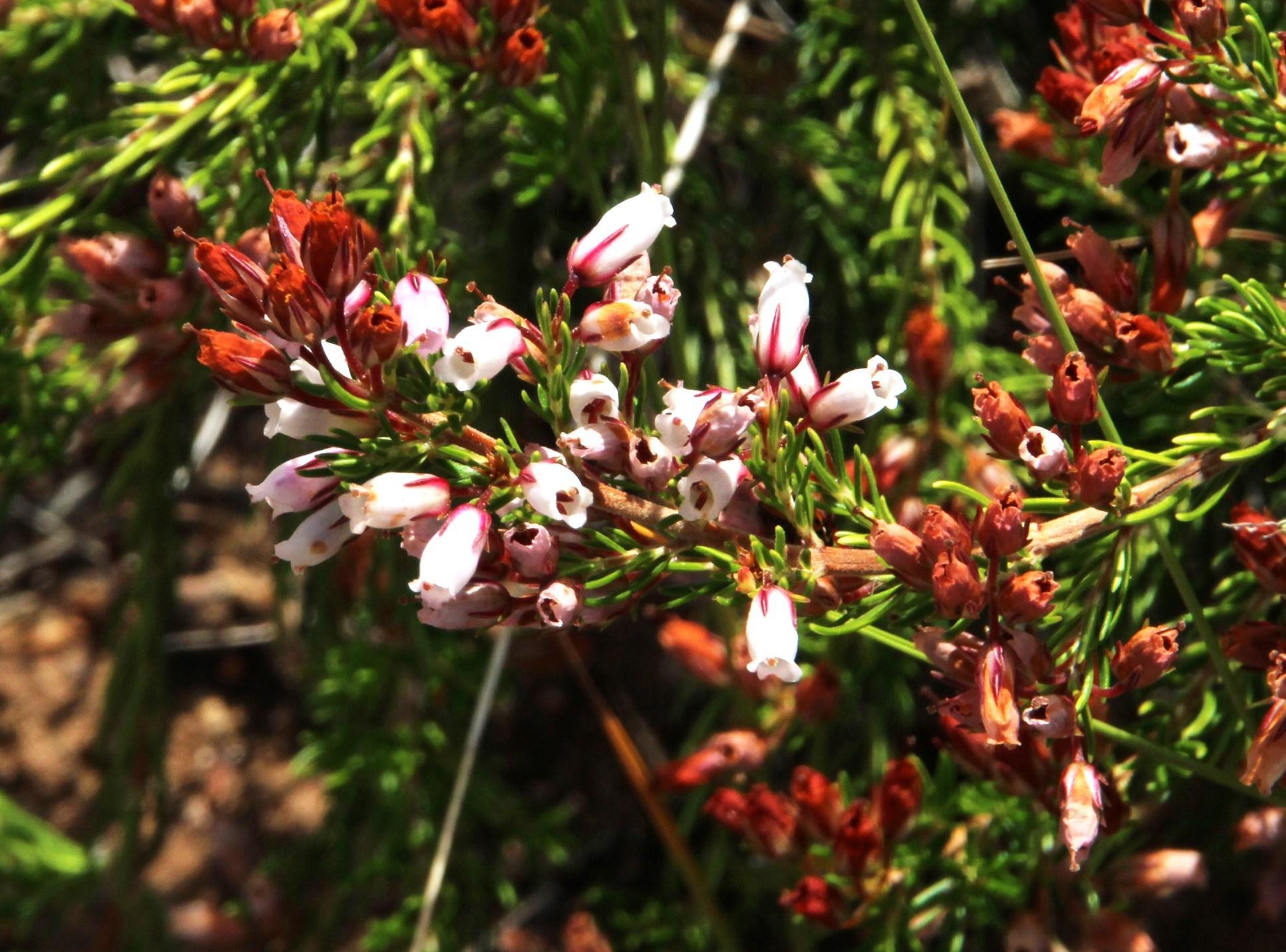

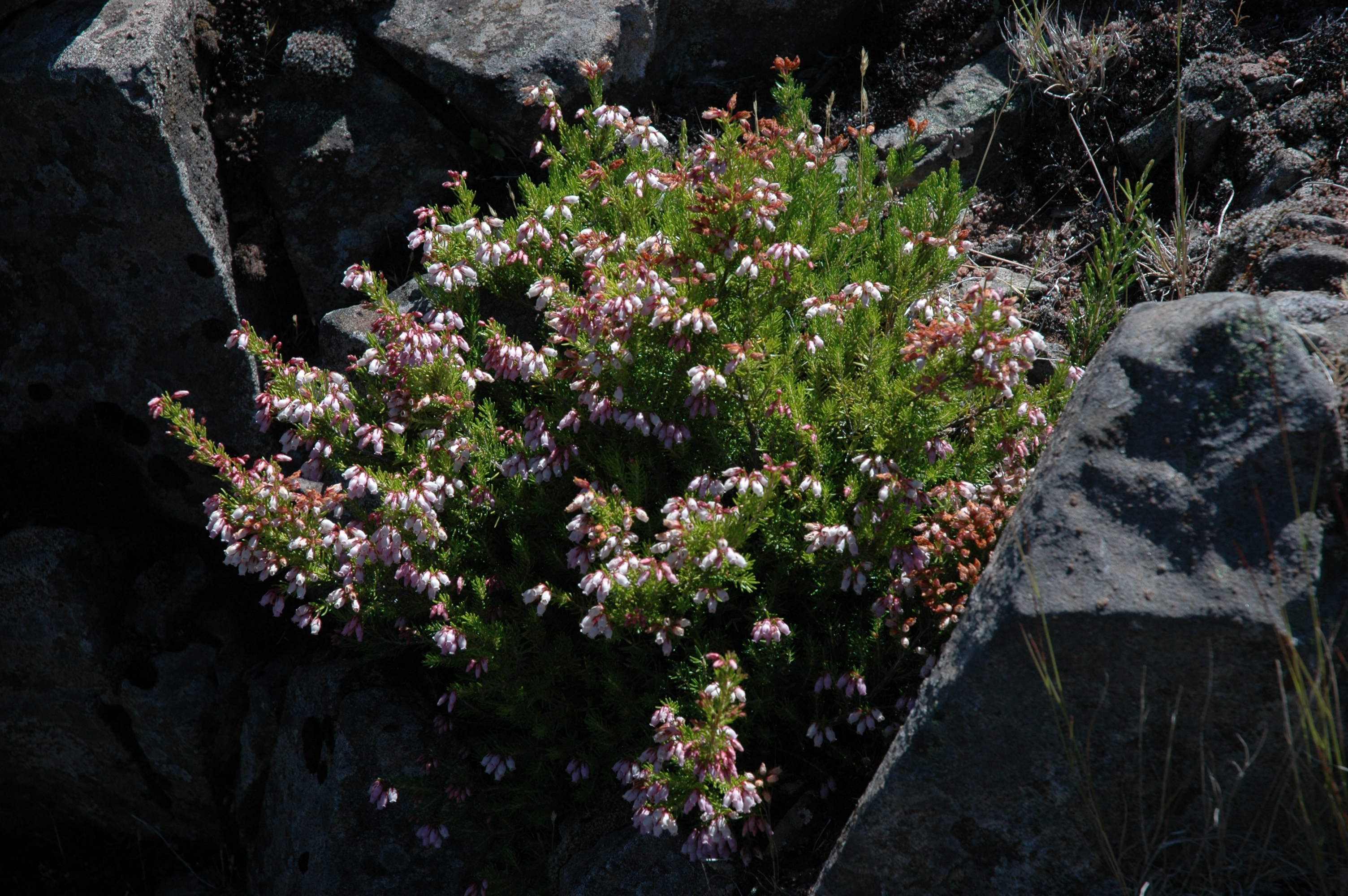

Conservation status
- Critically Endangered (IUCN 3.1)

Scientific classification
- Kingdom: Plantae
- Clade: Tracheophytes
- Clade: Angiosperms
- Clade: Eudicots
- Clade: Asterids
- Order: Ericales
- Family: Ericaceae
- Genus: Erica
- Species: E. maderensis

Binomial name
- Erica maderensis (Benth.) Bornm., (1903)

Synonyms
- Erica cinerea var. maderensis Benth.

= Erica maderensis =

Species of flowering plant

Erica maderensis is a plant belonging to the genus Erica. The species is endemic to Madeira.
