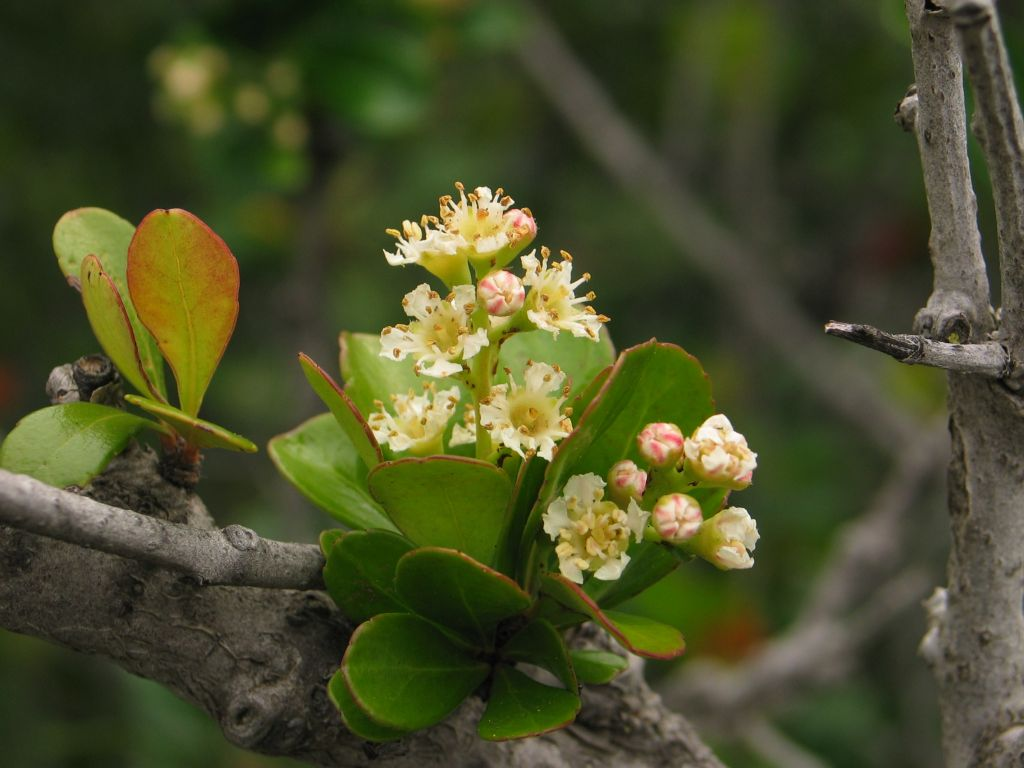

Conservation status
- Endangered (IUCN 3.1)

Scientific classification
- Kingdom: Plantae
- Clade: Tracheophytes
- Clade: Angiosperms
- Clade: Eudicots
- Clade: Rosids
- Order: Rosales
- Family: Rosaceae
- Subfamily: Amygdaloideae
- Tribe: Maleae
- Subtribe: Malinae
- Genus: Chamaemeles; Lindl.
- Species: C. coriacea

Binomial name
- Chamaemeles coriacea Lindl.

= Chamaemeles =

Genus of flowering plants

Chamaemeles is a monotypic genus of flowering plants in the family Rosaceae. Its only species, Chamaemeles coriacea, is endemic to Madeira.
