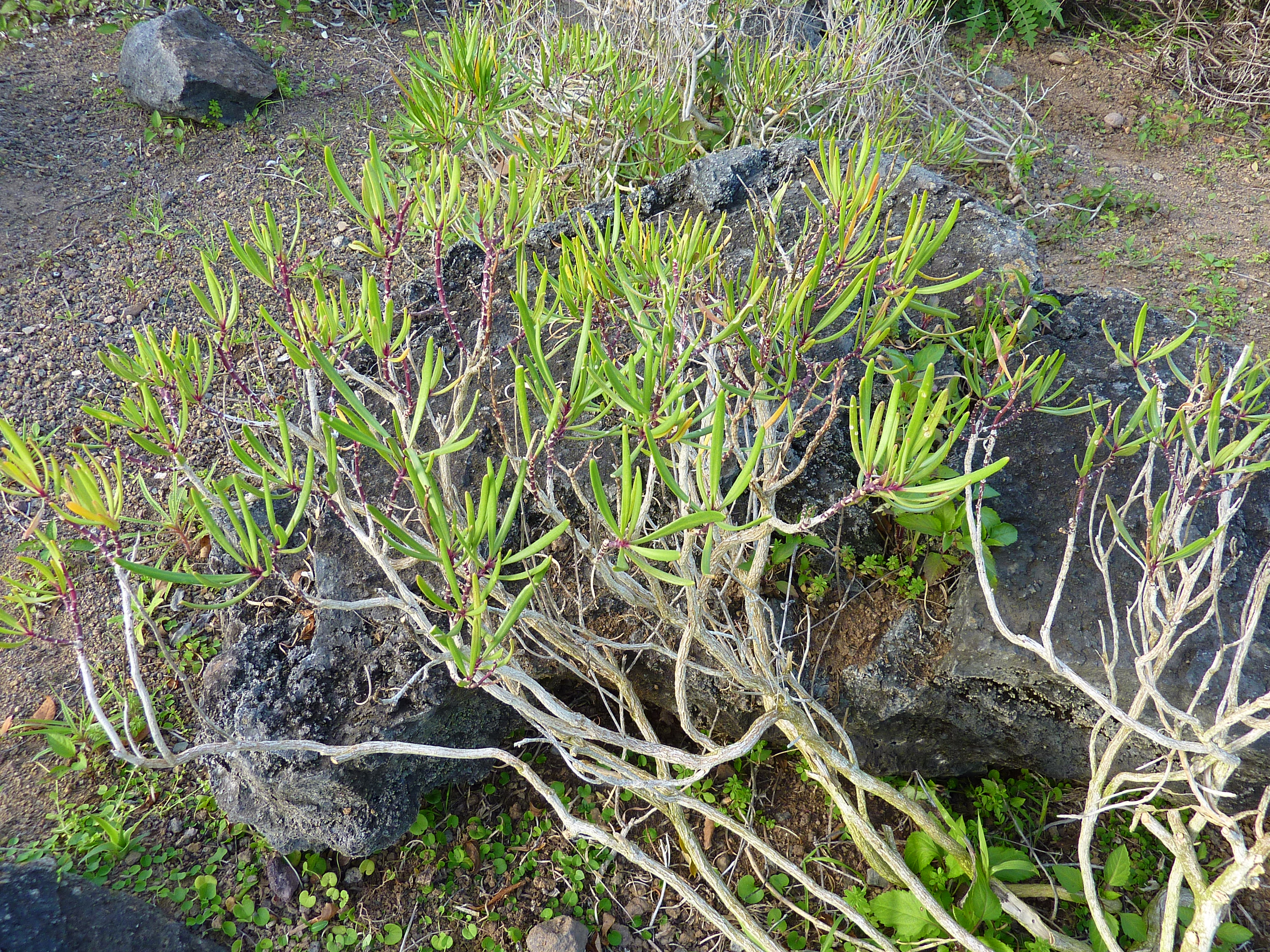
- Sinapidendron angustifolium

Scientific classification
- Kingdom: Plantae
- Clade: Tracheophytes
- Clade: Angiosperms
- Clade: Eudicots
- Clade: Rosids
- Order: Brassicales
- Family: Brassicaceae
- Genus: Sinapidendron; Lowe

= Sinapidendron =

Genus of plants

Sinapidendron is a genus of flowering plants belonging to the family Brassicaceae.

Its native range is Madeira.

Species:

- Sinapidendron angustifolium (DC.) Lowe
- Sinapidendron frutescens (Aiton) Lowe
- Sinapidendron gymnocalyx (Lowe) Rustan
- Sinapidendron rupestre Lowe
- Sinapidendron sempervivifolium Menezes
