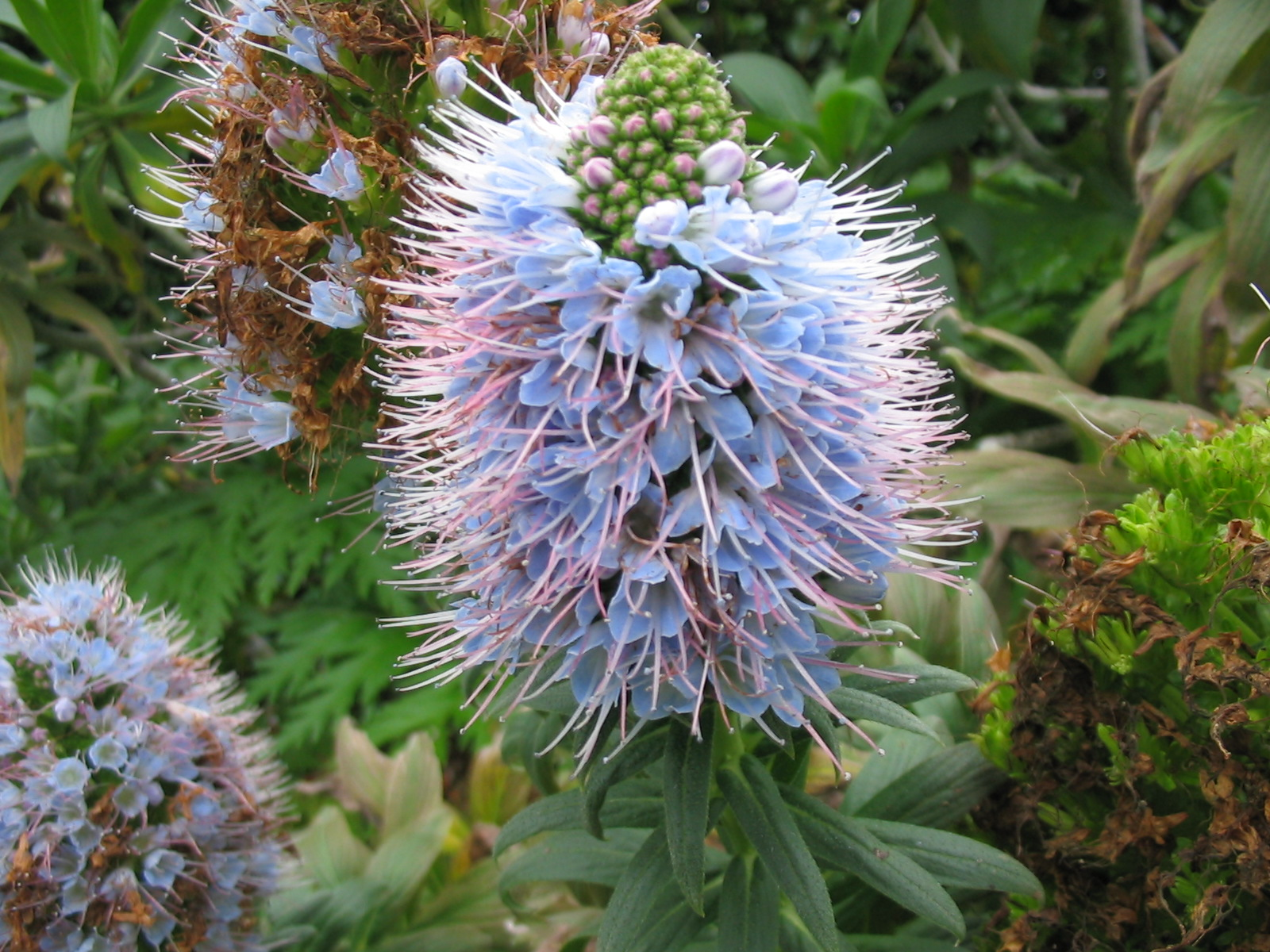
- Echium nervosum

Scientific classification
- Kingdom: Plantae
- Clade: Tracheophytes
- Clade: Angiosperms
- Clade: Eudicots
- Clade: Asterids
- Order: Boraginales
- Family: Boraginaceae
- Genus: Echium
- Species: E. nervosum

Binomial name
- Echium nervosum W.T. Aiton, 1810

= Echium nervosum =

Species of flowering plant

Echium nervosum is a species of flowering plants of the family Boraginaceae. It is endemic to Madeira. The specific name nervosum is from Latin and means "veined".

== Description ==
It is a compact woody shrub, average height 100 centimetres (39 in), maximum height 150 centimetres (59 in). The leaves are narrow, densely haired and silver green. Its flowers are pale blue to pale bluish rose and sit in an egg-shaped inflorescence.
