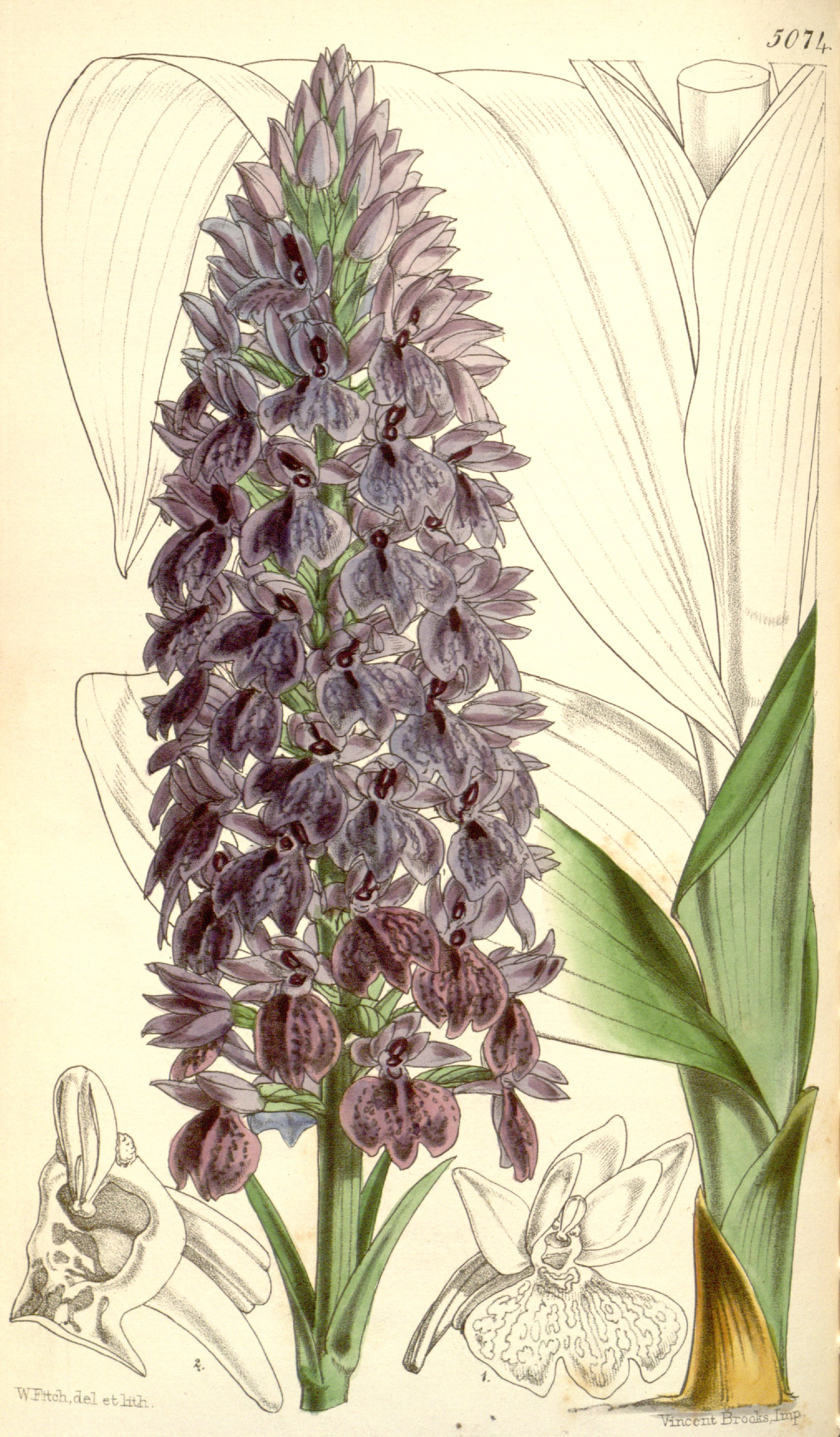
- 1857 illustration

Scientific classification
- Kingdom: Plantae
- Clade: Tracheophytes
- Clade: Angiosperms
- Clade: Monocots
- Order: Asparagales
- Family: Orchidaceae
- Subfamily: Orchidoideae
- Genus: Dactylorhiza
- Species: D. foliosa

Binomial name
- Dactylorhiza foliosa (Rchb.f.) Soó (1962)

= Dactylorhiza foliosa =

Species of flowering plant in the orchid family

Dactylorhiza foliosa, the Madeira orchid or leafy orchid, is a species of flowering plant in the family Orchidaceae, endemic to the Portuguese Island of Madeira in the eastern Atlantic Ocean. It is a tuberous herbaceous perennial growing to 60 cm (24 in) and producing spikes of intense, magenta-pink flowers in late spring.

This plant has gained the Royal Horticultural Society's Award of Garden Merit (confirmed 2017).

== Synonyms ==
- Orchis foliosa Sol. ex Lowe (1831), illegitimate homonym, not Sw. 1800 nor Masson ex Ker Gawl. 1819 nor Spreng. 1826 nor Schur 1866
- Orchis latifolia var. foliosa Rchb.f. (1851)
- Dactylorchis orientalis subsp. foliosa (Rchb.f.) Klinge (1898)
- Orchis orientalis subsp. foliosa (Rchb.f.) Klinge (1898)
- Dactylorchis foliosa (Rchb.f.) Verm. (1947)
- Orchis maderensis Summerh. (1947 publ. 1948)
- Dactylorhiza incarnata subsp. foliosa (Rchb.f.) H.Sund. (1975)

== Gallery ==
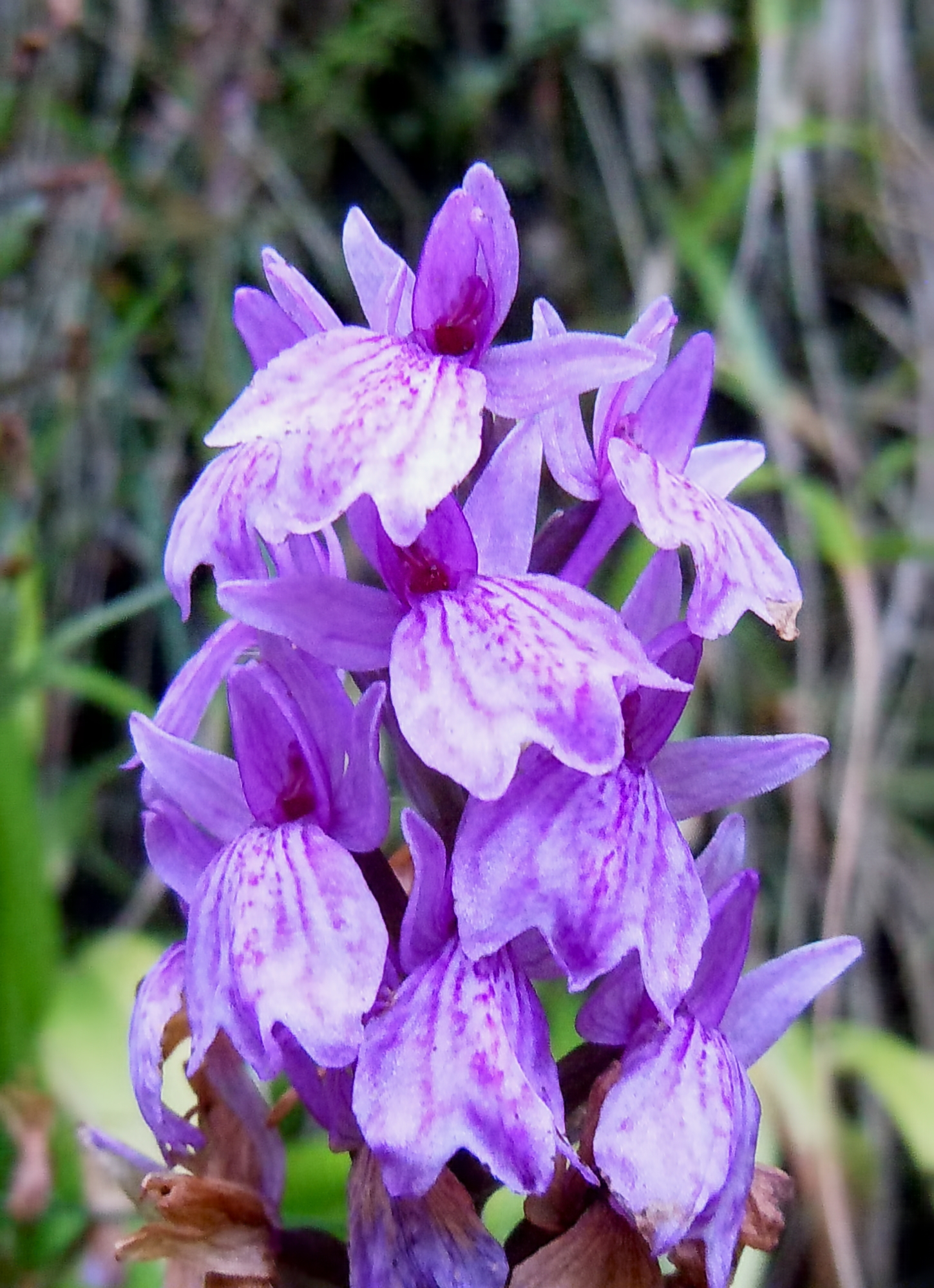

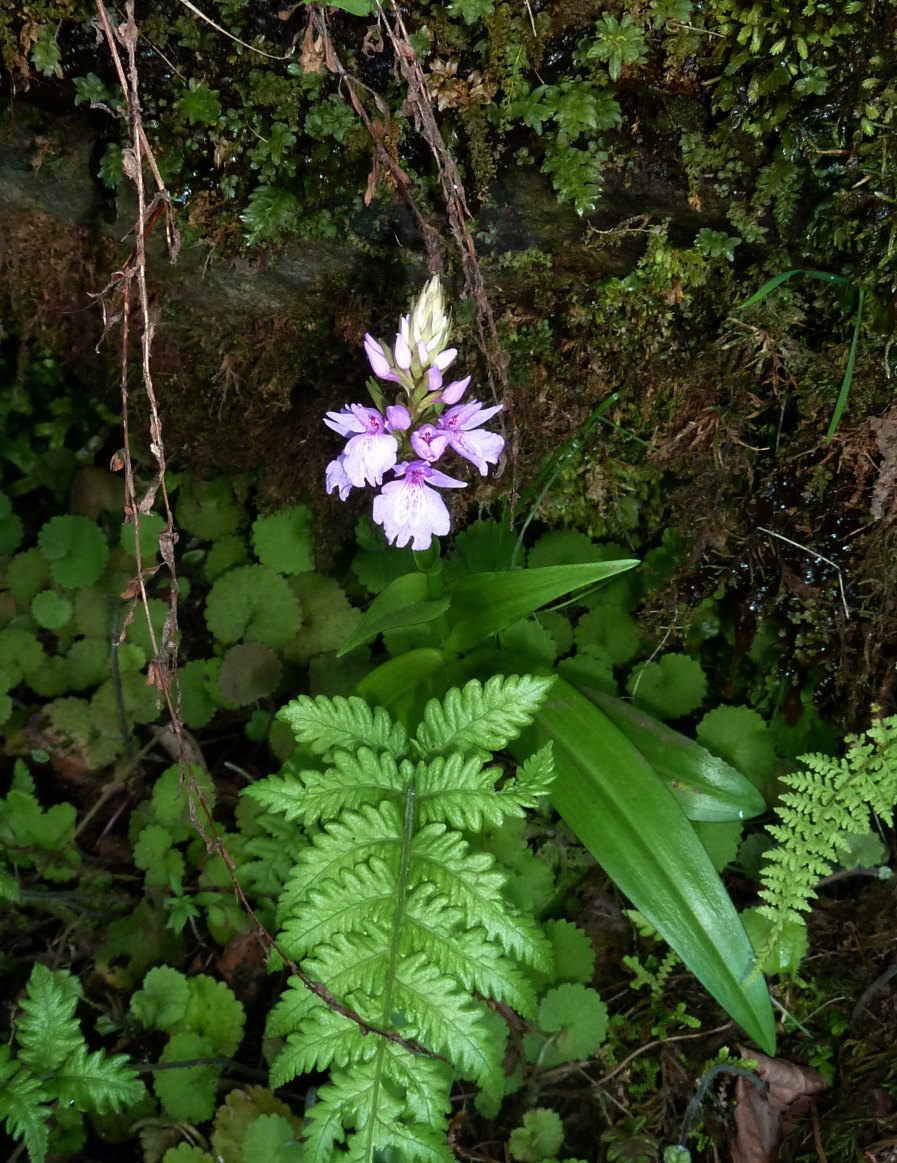
