= Parafestuca =

Scientific classification
- Kingdom: Plantae
- Clade: Tracheophytes
- Clade: Angiosperms
- Clade: Monocots
- Clade: Commelinids
- Order: Poales
- Family: Poaceae
- Subfamily: Pooideae
- Supertribe: Poodae
- Tribe: Poeae
- Subtribe: Aveninae
- Genus: Parafestuca; E.B.Alexeev
- Species: P. albida

Binomial name
- Parafestuca albida (Lowe) E.B.Alexeev

Synonyms
- Festuca albida Lowe

Genus of grasses

Parafestuca is a genus of plants in the grass family. The only known species is Parafestuca albida, found only on the Portuguese Island of Madeira in the North Atlantic.
