= Sonchus adscendens =

Scientific classification
- Kingdom: Plantae
- Clade: Tracheophytes
- Clade: Angiosperms
- Clade: Eudicots
- Clade: Asterids
- Order: Asterales
- Family: Asteraceae
- Genus: Sonchus
- Species: S. adscendens

Binomial name
- Sonchus adscendens Bojer ex DC.

Species of plant

Sonchus adscendens is a species of plant in the Sonchus genus. It was first published in Prodr. 6: 303 in 1838.
