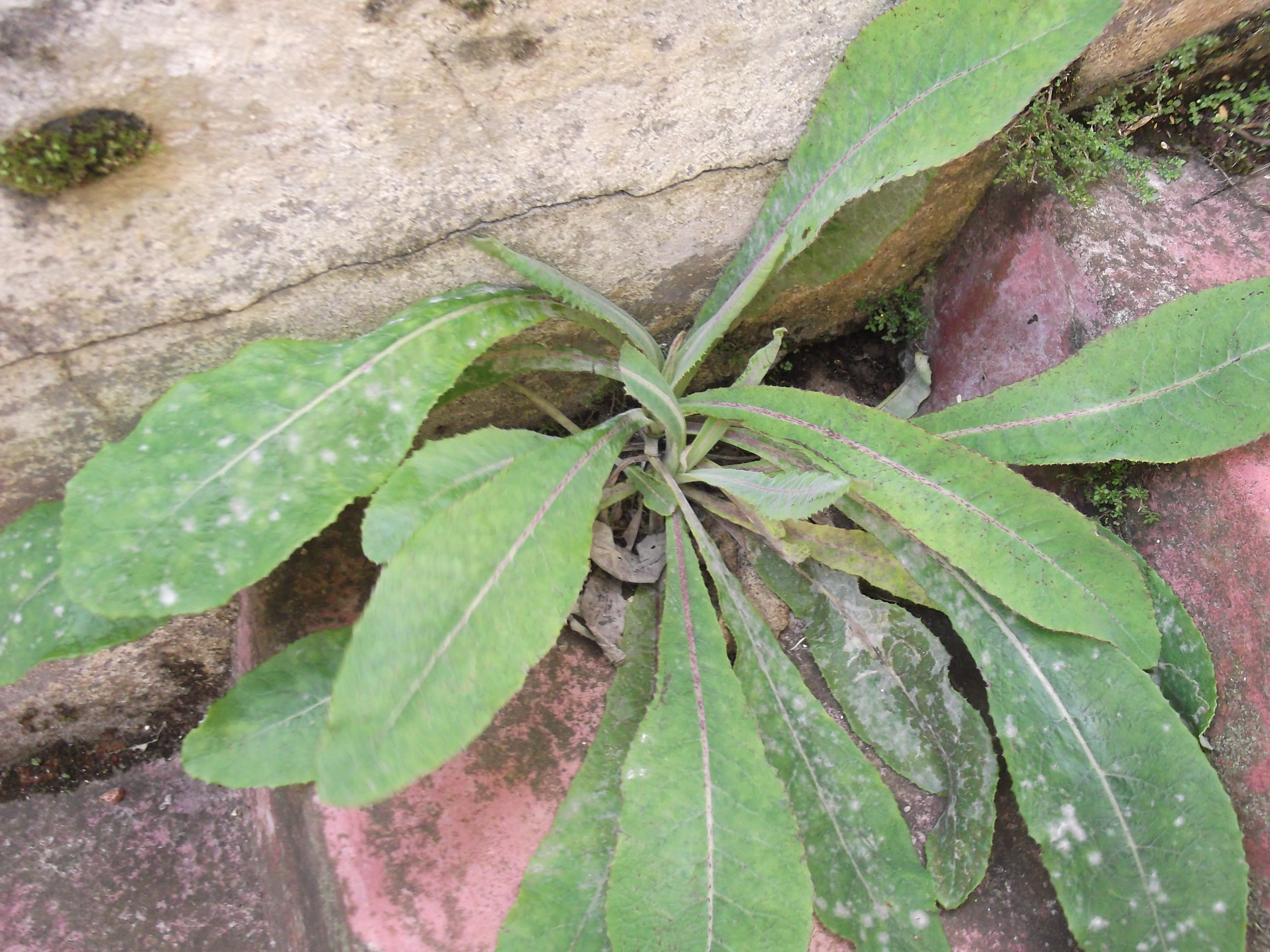

Scientific classification
- Kingdom: Plantae
- Clade: Tracheophytes
- Clade: Angiosperms
- Clade: Eudicots
- Clade: Asterids
- Order: Asterales
- Family: Asteraceae
- Genus: Sonchus
- Species: S. wightianus

Binomial name
- Sonchus wightianus DC. 1838

Synonyms
- Synonymy: Sonchus orixensis Roxb.; Sonchus picris H.Lév. & Vaniot; Sonchus lachnocephalus Rech.f.; Sonchus wallichianus DC.

= Sonchus wightianus =

Species of flowering plant

Sonchus wightianus is an Asian species of plants in the tribe Cichorieae within the family Asteraceae. It is widespread across much of Asia, found in China, the Indian Subcontinent, and Southeast Asia as far south as Indonesia.

Sonchus wightianus is a perennial herb up to 150 cm tall. Stems and the bracts around the flower heads have many purple hairs. The plant produces flat-topped arrays of several flower heads, each head with 180-300 yellow ray flowers but no disc flowers.
