= Sonchus tenerrimus =

Scientific classification
- Kingdom: Plantae
- Clade: Embryophytes
- Clade: Tracheophytes
- Clade: Angiosperms
- Clade: Eudicots
- Clade: Asterids
- Order: Asterales
- Family: Asteraceae
- Genus: Sonchus
- Species: S. tenerrimus

Binomial name
- Sonchus tenerrimus L. 1753 not Schur 1866

Synonyms
- Synonymy: Sonchus arborescens Salzm. ex Ball; Sonchus charmelii Sennen & Mauricio; Sonchus dianae Lacaita ex Willk.; Sonchus italicus Spreng.; Sonchus pectinatus DC.; Sonchus perennis (Lange) A.W.Hill; Sonchus septenensis Gand.; Sonchus tener Salisb.; Sonchus tenuifolius Nutt.; Sonchus zollikoferioides Rouy

Species of flowering plant in the daisy family

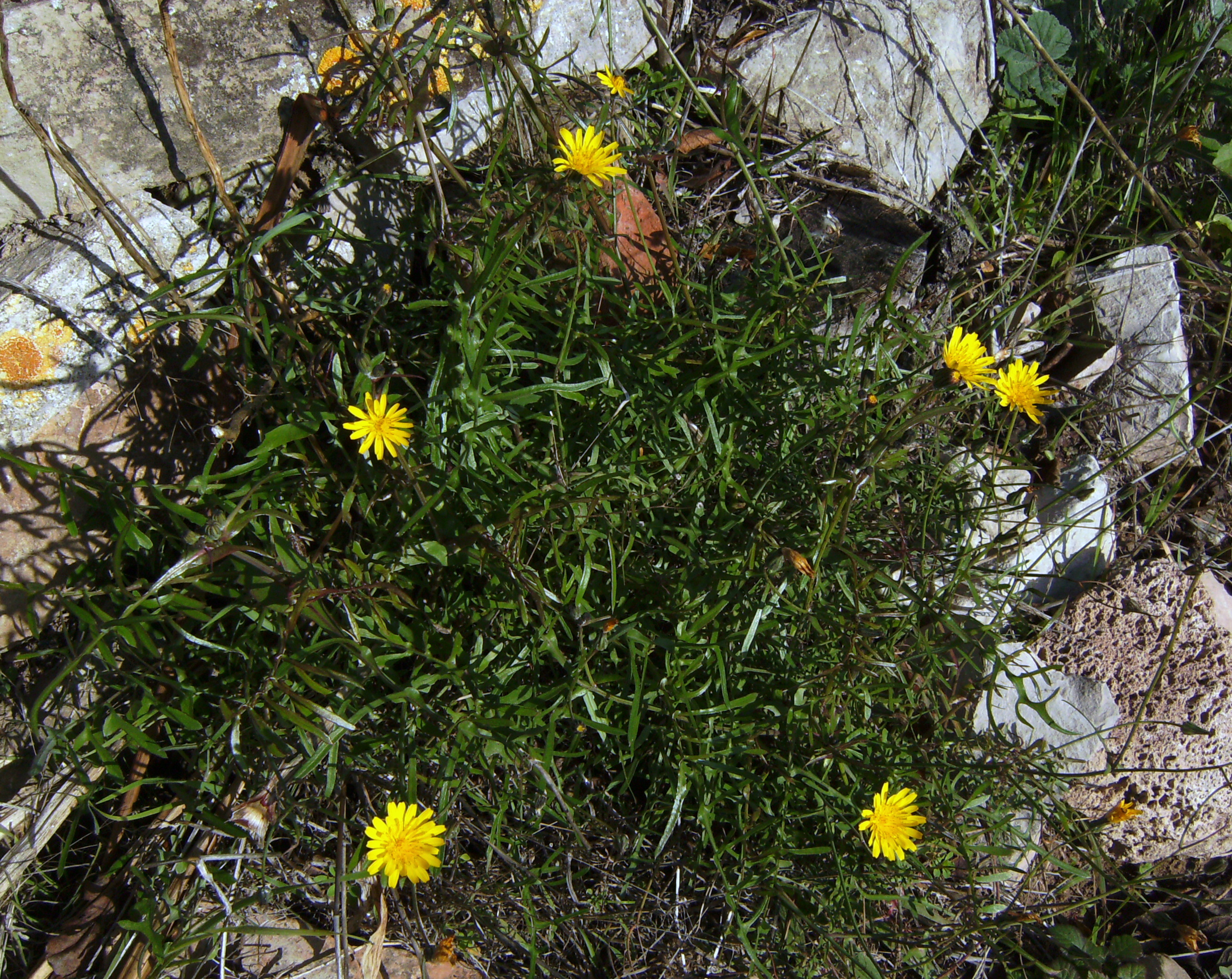

Sonchus tenerrimus is a species of flowering plant in the family Asteraceae known by the common name slender sowthistle. It is native to the Mediterranean region of southern Europe, northern Africa, and the Middle East. It has been found as well in several other locations around the world, historically in association with ship ballast in coastal regions. It has become naturalized in a few places, such as California in the United States and Baja California in Mexico.

Sonchus tenerrimus is an annual or perennial herb producing a slender, branching stem up to about 80 centimeters (32 inches) tall. The leaves are deeply divided into many variously shaped lobes which may have toothed edges or smaller lobes. The inflorescence bears flower heads lined with glandular, hairy to woolly phyllaries. They are filled with numerous yellow ray florets but no disc florets. The fruit is an achene up to a centimeter long including its pappus.
