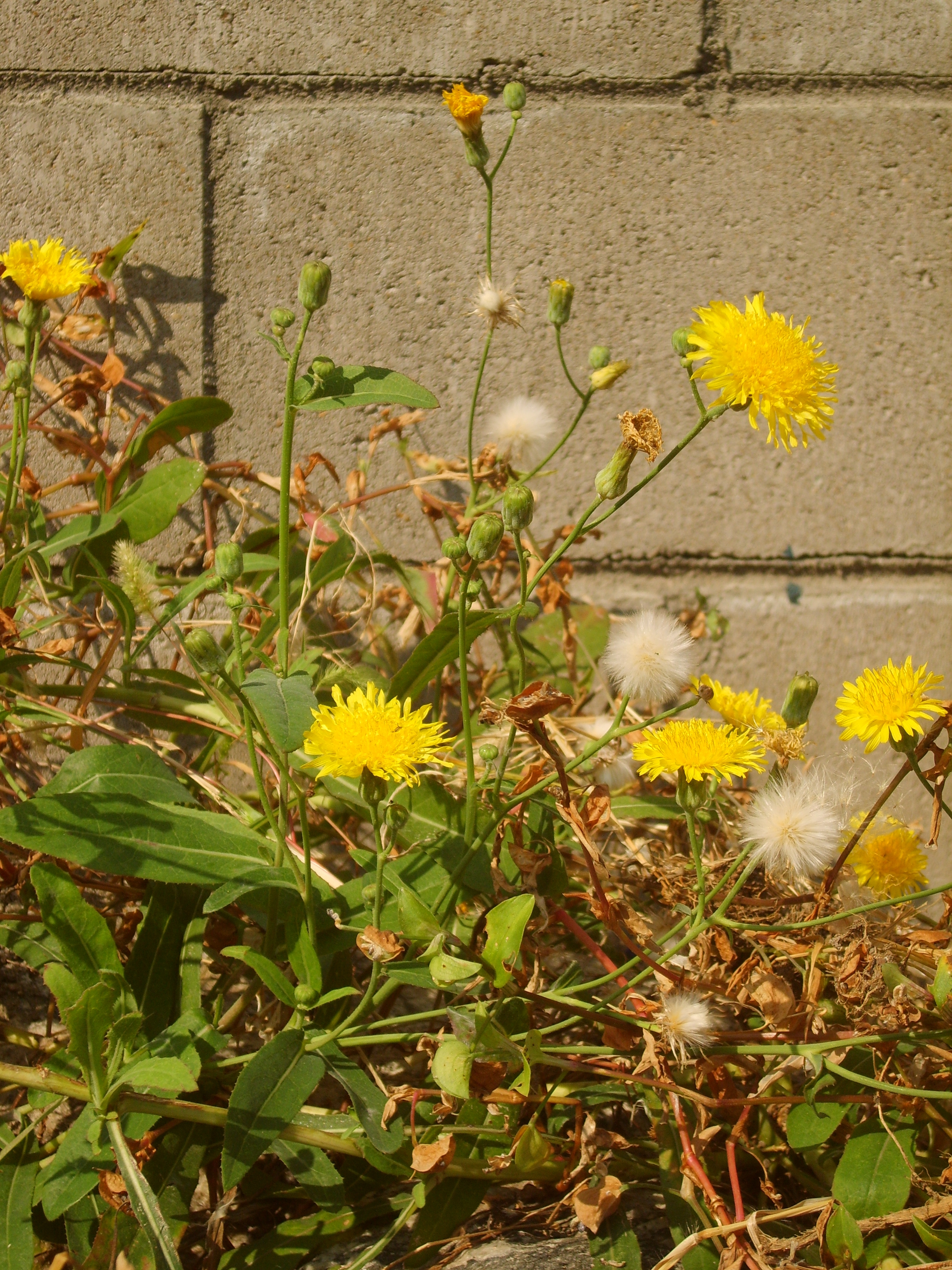

Scientific classification
- Kingdom: Plantae
- Clade: Tracheophytes
- Clade: Angiosperms
- Clade: Eudicots
- Clade: Asterids
- Order: Asterales
- Family: Asteraceae
- Genus: Sonchus
- Species: S. brachyotus

Binomial name
- Sonchus brachyotus DC. 1838

Synonyms
- Synonymy: Sonchus arenicola Vorosch.; Sonchus arvensis subsp. arenicola (Vorosch.) Vorosch.; Sonchus arvensis subsp. brachyotus (DC.) Kitam.; Sonchus arvensis var. glaber Haines; Sonchus arvensis var. laevipes Koch; Sonchus brachyotus var. potaninii Tzvelev; Sonchus cavaleriei H.Lév.; Sonchus chinensis Fisch.; Sonchus chinensis Schrank; Sonchus fauriei H.Lév. & Vaniot; Sonchus shzucinianus Turcz. ex Herder; Sonchus taquetii H.Lév.

= Sonchus brachyotus =

Species of flowering plant

Sonchus brachyotus is an Asian species of plant in the tribe Cichorieae within the family Asteraceae. It is widespread across much of northern Asia, found in Japan, Korea, China, Russia, Mongolia, Thailand, Kazakhstan, Caucasus, Kyrgyzstan, etc.

Sonchus brachyotus is a perennial herb up to 100 cm tall. It produces flat-topped arrays of several flower heads, each head with 170-300 yellow ray flowers but no disc flowers. It grows on grassy slopes on mountains and alongside rivers.
