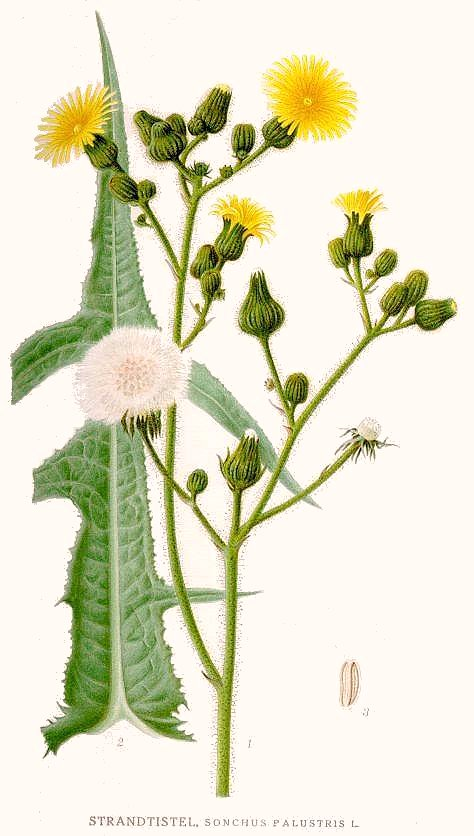
- Painting by C.A.M. Lindman

Scientific classification
- Kingdom: Plantae
- Clade: Tracheophytes
- Clade: Angiosperms
- Clade: Eudicots
- Clade: Asterids
- Order: Asterales
- Family: Asteraceae
- Genus: Sonchus
- Species: S. palustris

Binomial name
- Sonchus palustris L. 1753

Synonyms
- Sonchidium palustre (L.) Pomel; Sonchus inundatus Popov; Sonchus paludosus Gueldenst. ex Ledeb.; Sonchus sagittatus Moench; Sonchus sespedalis Gilib.

= Sonchus palustris =

Marsh sowthistle

Species of flowering plant

Sonchus palustris, commonly known as marsh sowthistle, is a plant native to temperate regions of the Europe, Russia, Central Asia, and Xinjiang in western China. It has also become naturalized in a few locations in the Canadian Province of Ontario.

Sonchus palustris can be found in damp peaty or silty soils rich in nitrogen. The species epithet palustris is Latin for "of the marsh" and indicates its common habitat. It is a perennial herb sometimes as much as 350 cm (almost 12 feet) tall. It produces an array of numerous flower heads, each with numerous yellow ray flowers but no disc flowers.
