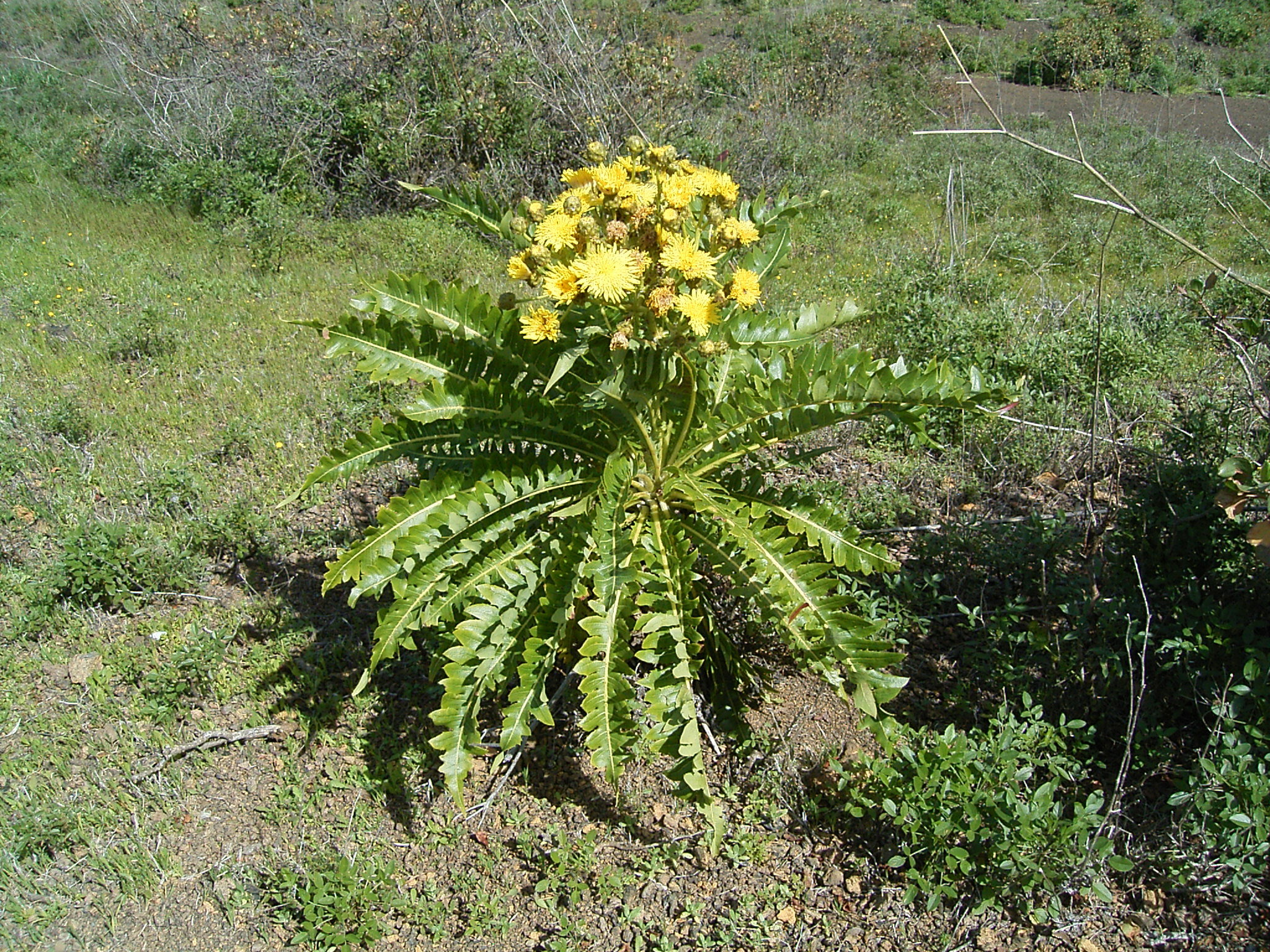

Scientific classification
- Kingdom: Plantae
- Clade: Tracheophytes
- Clade: Angiosperms
- Clade: Eudicots
- Clade: Asterids
- Order: Asterales
- Family: Asteraceae
- Genus: Sonchus
- Species: S. canariensis

Binomial name
- Sonchus canariensis (Webb) Boulos

= Sonchus canariensis =

Species of plant

Sonchus canariensis, the tree sonchus, is a species of plant endemic to the Canary Islands.

== Description ==
Its leaves are arranged in a terminal rosette on the branches. The capitula are wide, up to 1.5 cm in diameter and 3 m in height, arranged in a loose inflorescence. The leaves are pinnatisect, with narrow foliar lobes.

== Distribution ==
Sonchus canariensis is endemic to the central Canary islands, with the subspecies canariensis on both islands and subspecies orotavensis Boulos only in Tenerife.

== Etymology ==
Sonchus: generic name from the Latin Sonchus, -i , derived from the Greek σόθχος, the locksmith; used by Pliny the Elder in its History Naturalis , 22, 88

canariensis: alluding to the Canary archipelago, in its broadest sense.
