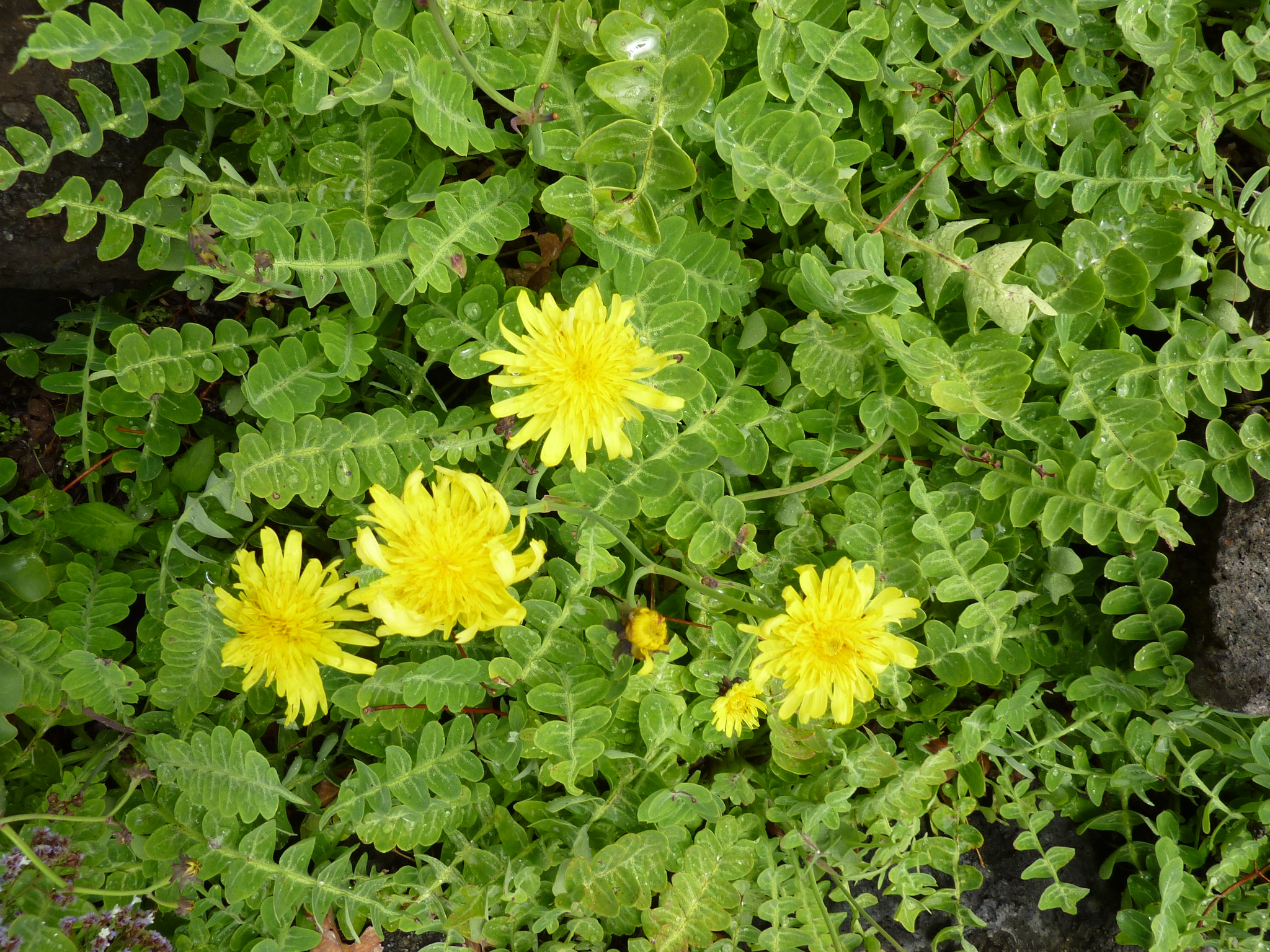
- Sonchus ustulatus subsp. maderensis in the Jardín Botánico Canario Viera y Clavijo

Scientific classification
- Kingdom: Plantae
- Clade: Tracheophytes
- Clade: Angiosperms
- Clade: Eudicots
- Clade: Asterids
- Order: Asterales
- Family: Asteraceae
- Genus: Sonchus
- Species: S. ustulatus

Binomial name
- Sonchus ustulatus Lowe (1831)

= Sonchus ustulatus =

Species of flowering plant

Sonchus ustulatus, also known as a leituga, is a species of herb in the Asteraceae family. It is endemic to Madeira, an island group in the Atlantic which is politically part of Portugal. It grows to be around 0.2 meters.

== Description ==
The leituga is a perennial plant that either has no stem or a very short one. It does not have many floral heads and generally grows on a rocky shoreline. It is herbaceous.

== Subspecies ==
The leituga has 2 subspecies:

- Sonchus ustulatus subsp. ustulatus
- Sonchus ustulatus subsp. mederensis (Syn.: S. latifolius)

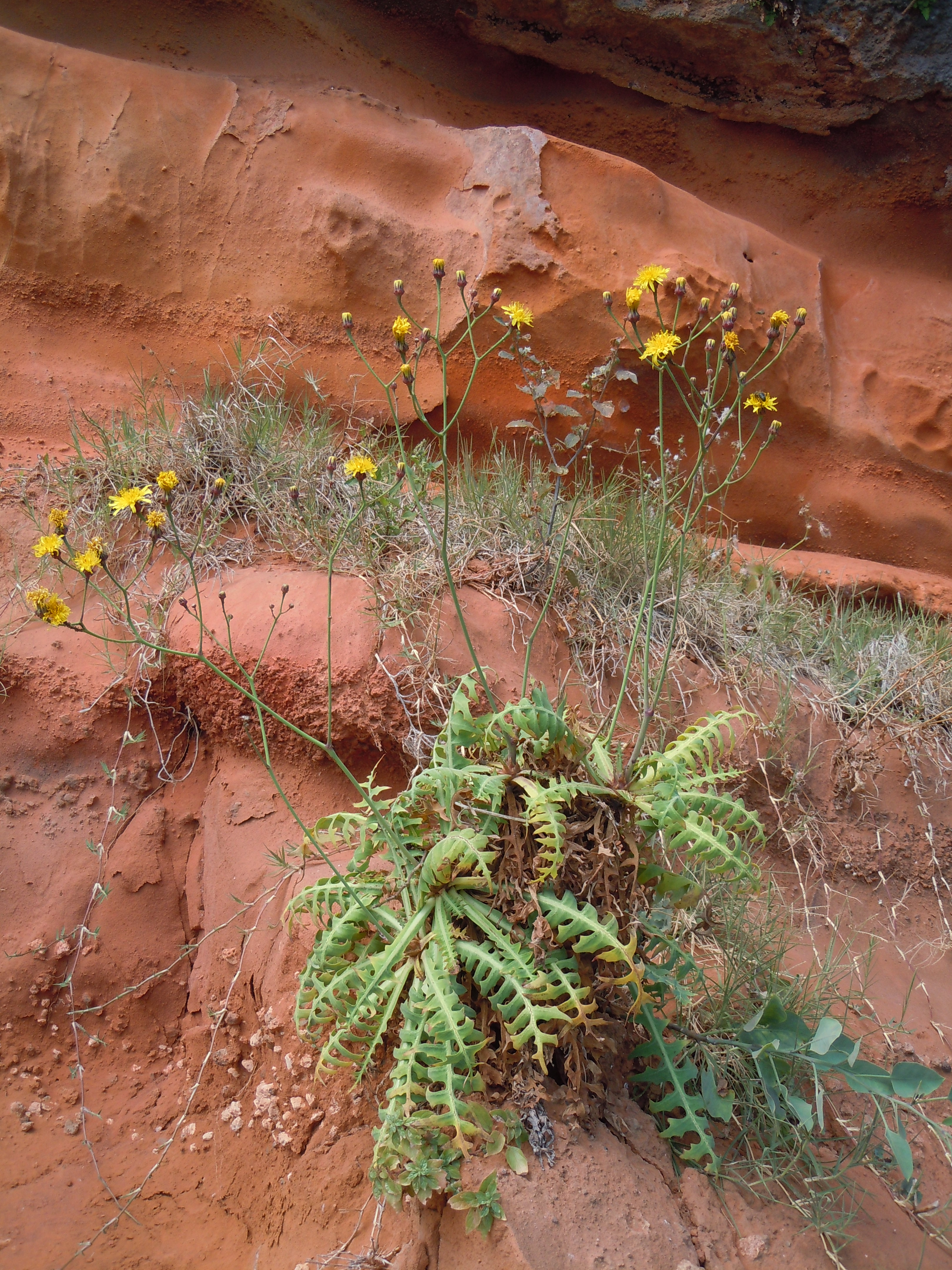
Sonchus ustulatus subsp. ustulatus, in Câmara de Lobos, Madeira

== Found near ==
- San Cristóbal de la Laguna
- Distrito Anaga
- Funchal
- Calheta
- São Vicente
