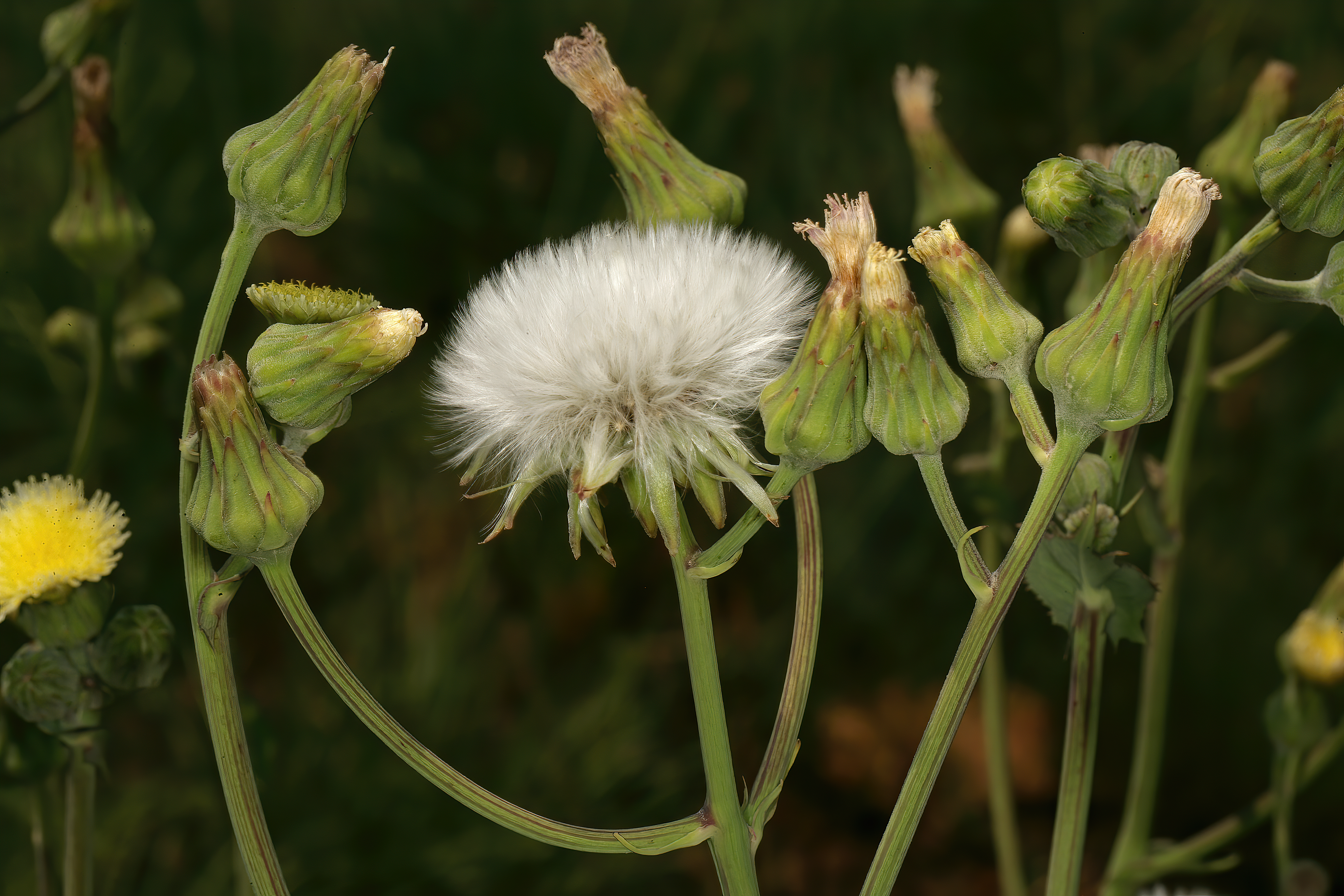
- Fruiting head of Sonchus wilmsii

Scientific classification
- Kingdom: Plantae
- Clade: Tracheophytes
- Clade: Angiosperms
- Clade: Eudicots
- Clade: Asterids
- Order: Asterales
- Family: Asteraceae
- Genus: Sonchus
- Species: S. wilmsii

Binomial name
- Sonchus wilmsii R.E.Fr.

= Sonchus wilmsii =

Species of plant

Sonchus wilmsii is a species of flowering plant in the family Asteraceae and is endemic to southern Africa. It is an erect, perennial herb that typically grows of up to about 1 m (3 ft 3 in). This species was first formally described in 1925 by Robert Elias Fries in Acta Horti Bergiana and it grows in grassland in Cape Provinces, Free State, KwaZulu-Natal, Lesotho, Mozambique, Northern Provinces and Eswatini in southern Africa.
