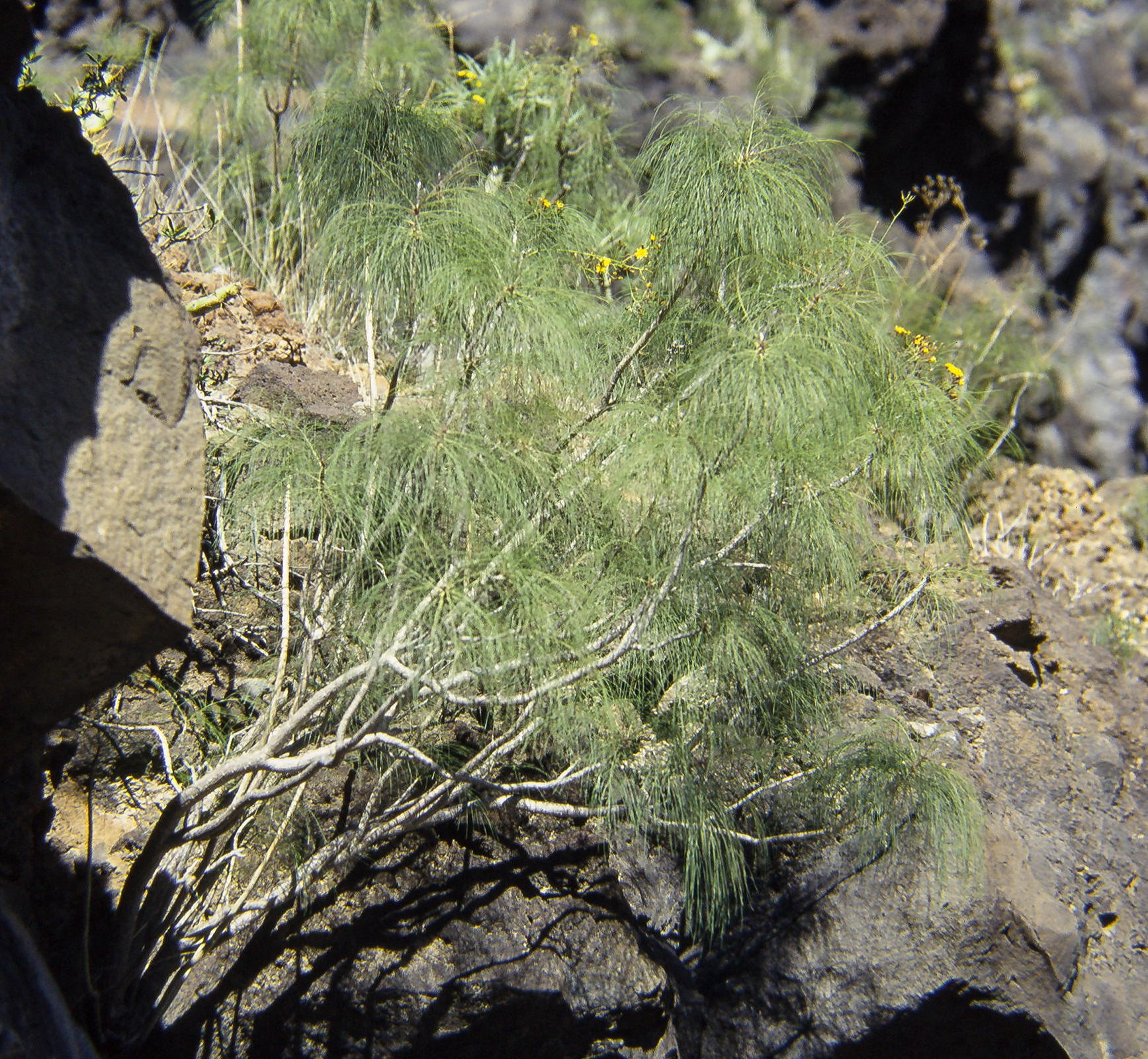
- In habitat in the Barranco del Infierno, Tenerife

Scientific classification
- Kingdom: Plantae
- Clade: Tracheophytes
- Clade: Angiosperms
- Clade: Eudicots
- Clade: Asterids
- Order: Asterales
- Family: Asteraceae
- Genus: Sonchus
- Species: S. capillaris

Binomial name
- Sonchus capillaris Svent.

Synonyms
- Atalanthus capillaris (Svent.) A.Hansen & Sunding; Sonchus leptocephalus subsp. capillaris (Svent.) Aldridge; Taeckholmia capillaris (Svent.) Boulos

= Sonchus capillaris =

Species of flowering plant

Sonchus capillaris is a species of flowering plant in the family Asteraceae. It is endemic to the Canary Islands.

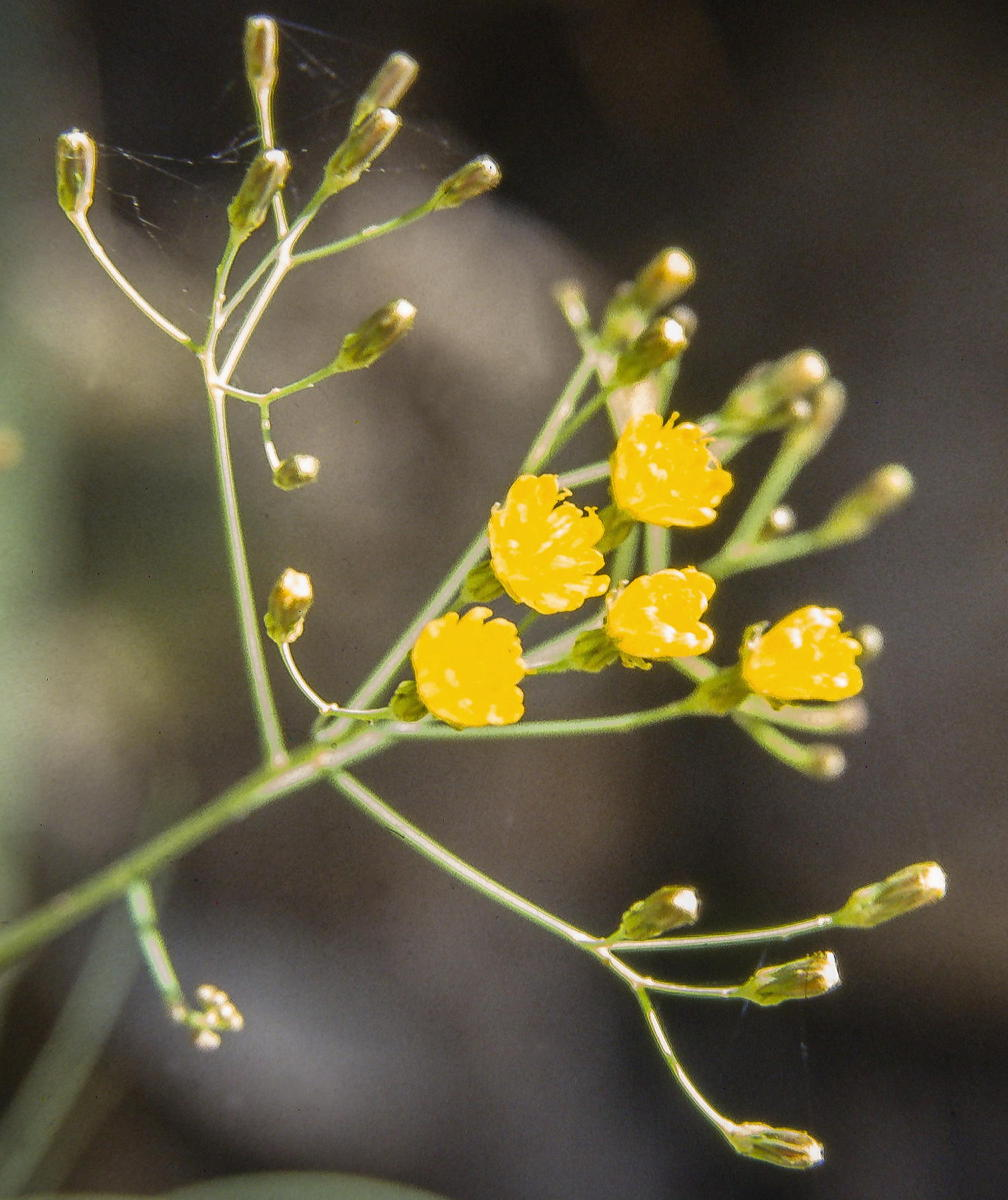
Flowers
