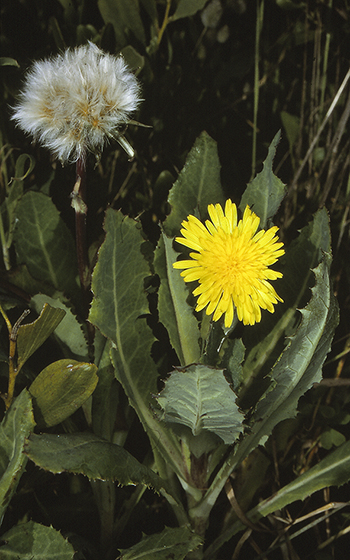

Scientific classification
- Kingdom: Plantae
- Clade: Tracheophytes
- Clade: Angiosperms
- Clade: Eudicots
- Clade: Asterids
- Order: Asterales
- Family: Asteraceae
- Subfamily: Cichorioideae
- Tribe: Cichorieae
- Genus: Actites; Lander
- Species: A. megalocarpus

Binomial name
- Actites megalocarpus (Hook.f.) Lander

Synonyms
- Sonchus asper var. megalocarpus Hook.f.; Sonchus megalocarpus (Hook.f.) J.M.Black

= Actites =

Species of plant

Actites, commonly known as the dune thistle, beach thistle or coastal sow thistle, is a genus of flowering plants in the family Asteraceae. It is endemic to Australia and contains only one species, Actites megalocarpus. It is a large, clumping herb with yellow flowers. Although accepted by Australian sources, others treat Actites as a synonym of Sonchus and the species as Sonchus macrocarpus.

== Description ==
Actites megalocarpus is a fleshy perennial herb. The leaves are stiff, prominently veined, margins toothed and wavy, elliptic to oblanceolate shaped, 1.5–26 cm (0.59–10.24 in) long, 0.5–4.5 cm (0.20–1.77 in) wide, either tapering at the base or heart-shaped and sessile. The yellow dandelion-like flowers are 1–2 cm (0.39–0.79 in) in diameter, occasionally pale purple near the base, and on a peduncle 1–10 mm (0.039–0.394 in) long. The bracts are narrow-triangular shaped, the lower midrib of outer bracts has spines. Flowering occurs from September to June and the fruit is a compressed, light to dark brown one-seeded achene, 4–8 mm (0.16–0.31 in) long with 3 longitudinal ribs.

== Taxonomy and naming ==
The species was first formally described in 1856 by Joseph Dalton Hooker as Sonchus asper var. megalocarpus. It was raised to a full species and placed in his new genus Actites in 1976 by Nicholas Sèan Lander. The specific epithet (megalocarpus) means "large fruited". The placement in the genus Actites was accepted by the Australian Plant Census as of May 2026, but other sources treated the genus as a synonym of Sonchus, and the species as Sonchus macrocarpus.

== Distribution and habitat ==
Dune thistle is usually found on coastal dunes and cliffs from Toorbul in Queensland to Middleton Beach in Western Australia and the south-east coast of Tasmania.
