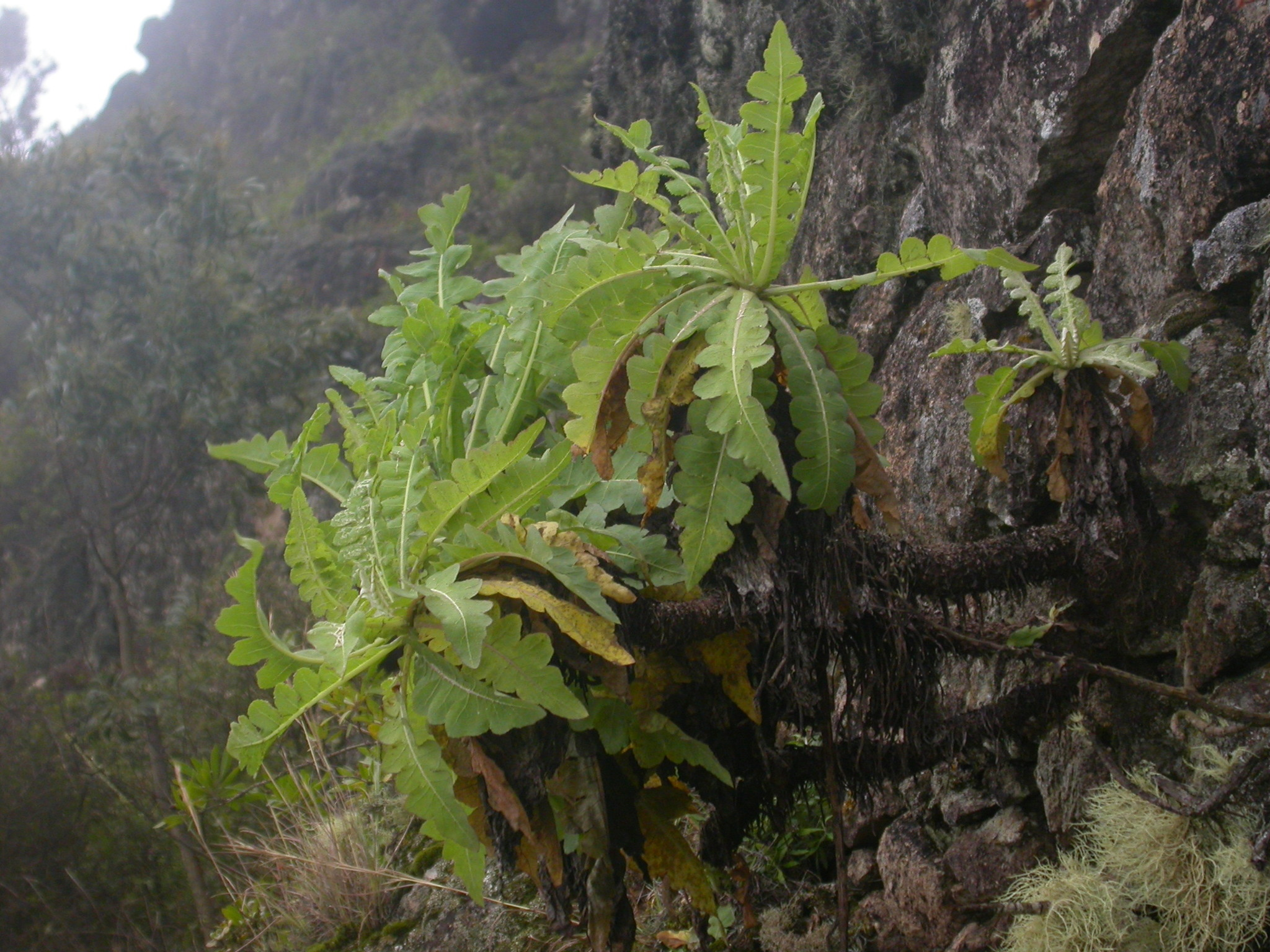

Conservation status
- Endangered (IUCN 3.1)

Scientific classification
- Kingdom: Plantae
- Clade: Tracheophytes
- Clade: Angiosperms
- Clade: Eudicots
- Clade: Asterids
- Order: Asterales
- Family: Asteraceae
- Genus: Sonchus
- Species: S. daltonii

Binomial name
- Sonchus daltonii Webb, 1849

= Sonchus daltonii =

Species of flowering plant

Sonchus daltonii is a species of flowering plants of the family Asteraceae. The species is endemic to Cape Verde. It is listed as endangered by the IUCN. The genus was named by Philip Barker Webb in 1849. Its local name is coroa-de-rei ("king's crown").

== Distribution and ecology ==
Sonchus daltonii occurs on the Capeverdean islands of Santo Antão, São Vicente, São Nicolau, Santiago and Fogo. It grows in humid and sub-humid zones, mainly between 800 and 1,800 metres elevation. It is used for grazing animals, and it is highly threatened by nomadic grazing.
