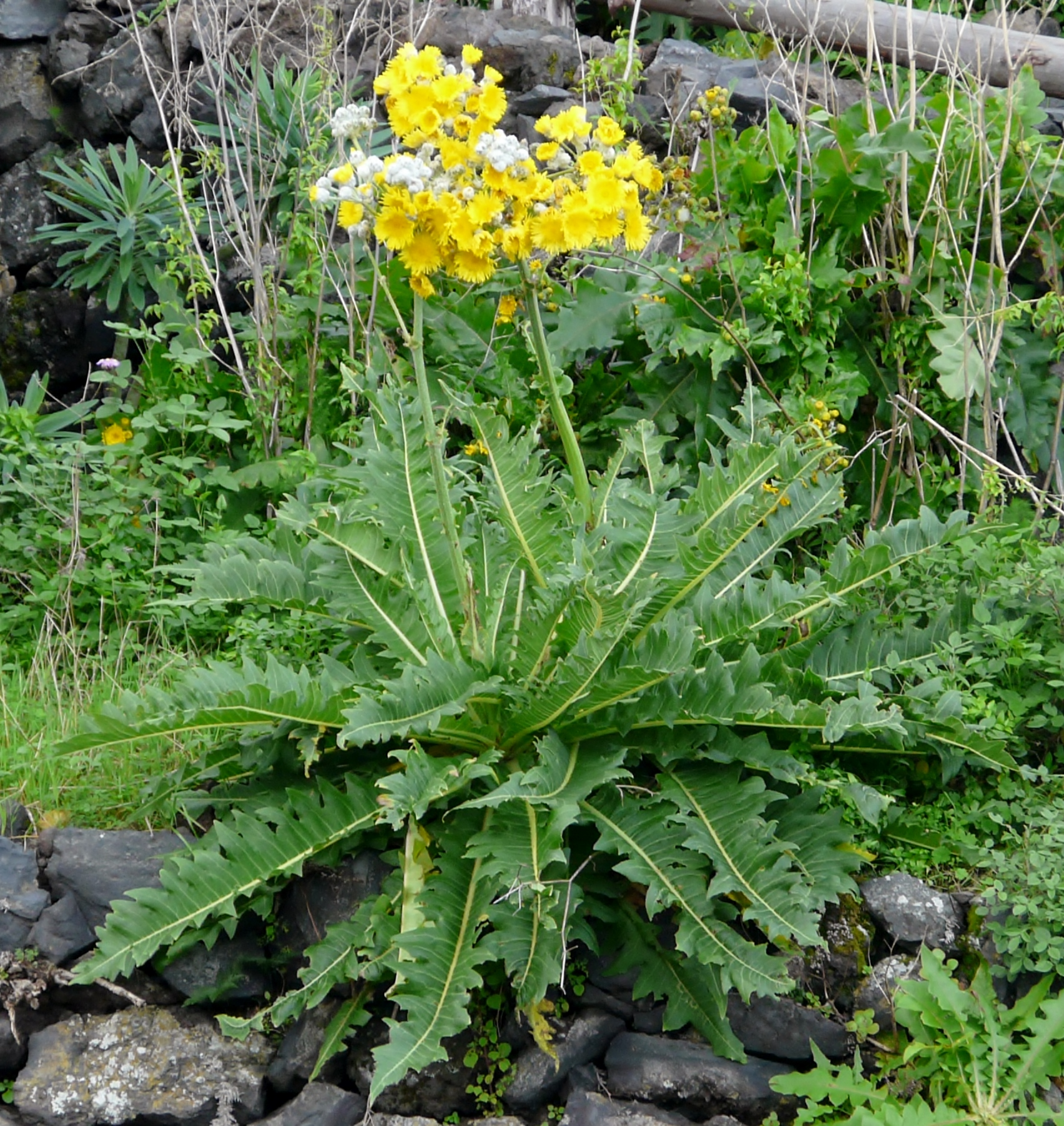

Scientific classification
- Kingdom: Plantae
- Clade: Embryophytes
- Clade: Tracheophytes
- Clade: Spermatophytes
- Clade: Angiosperms
- Clade: Eudicots
- Clade: Asterids
- Order: Asterales
- Family: Asteraceae
- Genus: Sonchus
- Species: S. acaulis

Binomial name
- Sonchus acaulis Dum.-Cours. 1811

= Sonchus acaulis =

Species of flowering plant

Sonchus acaulis is a plant species in the tribe Cichorieae within the family Asteraceae. It is found only on the Canary Islands of Gran Canaria and Tenerife.

== Description ==
Perennial. Base woody. Leaves in a single large basal rosette up to 1 m across; pinnatifid, wooly, with a pointy tip. Scape up to 1.5 m, without bracts. Inflorescence an umbellate group of flower heads. Peduncles with 1 to several heads, wooly. Involucral bracts broad, very densely white-tomentose. Heads about 2.5 cm across with numerous yellow ray flowers but no disc flowers.

== Distribution ==
Tenerife: Widespread in forest and xerophytic zones, Sierra Anaga to Teno particularly along the northern coast. Gran Canaria: Montane regions, Los Tiles de Moya, Tenteniguada, Cruz de Tejeda, Roque Nublo, etc., 500-1600 m, locally frequent.
