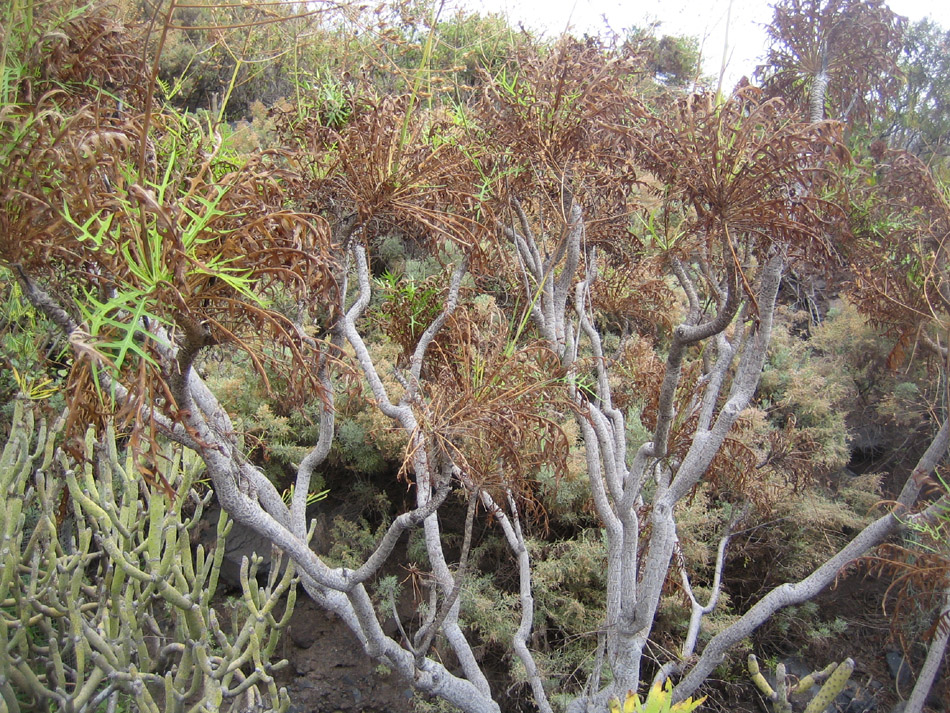

Conservation status
- Critically Endangered (IUCN 3.1)

Scientific classification
- Kingdom: Plantae
- Clade: Embryophytes
- Clade: Tracheophytes
- Clade: Angiosperms
- Clade: Eudicots
- Clade: Asterids
- Order: Asterales
- Family: Asteraceae
- Genus: Sonchus
- Species: S. gandogeri

Binomial name
- Sonchus gandogeri Pit.

= Sonchus gandogeri =

Species of flowering plant

Sonchis gandogeri is a plant in the Asteraceae family and is native to the Canary Islands, with its two populations with one in the village of El Golfo and another in the Las Esperillas of El Hierro. Charles-Joseph Marie Pitard first described it in 1909. It is currently critically endangered, and its extinction would likely be brought on by environmental or demographic forces. S. pinnatus canariensis and S. hierrensis were probably bred together to create S. gandogeri.
