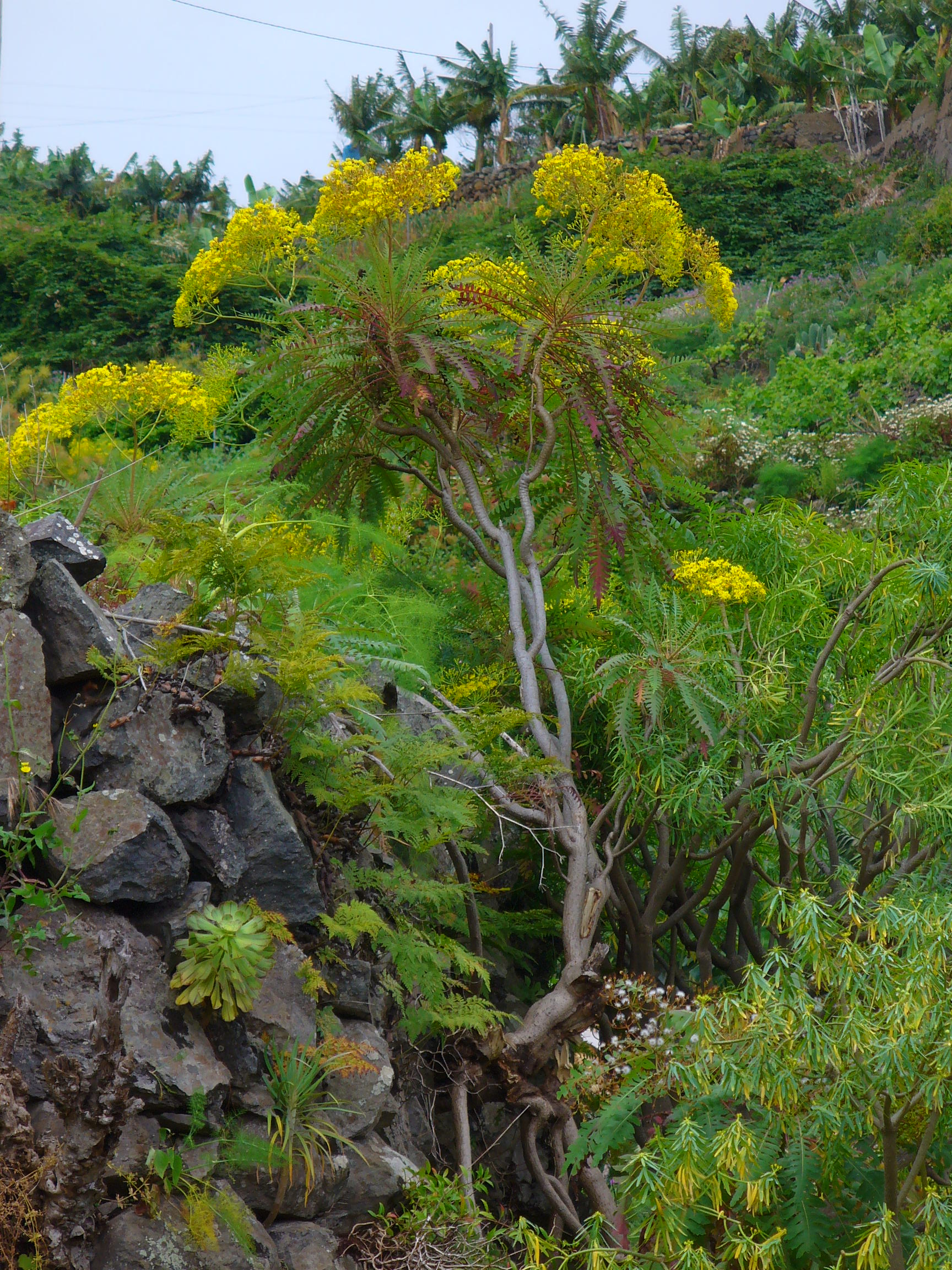

Scientific classification
- Kingdom: Plantae
- Clade: Embryophytes
- Clade: Tracheophytes
- Clade: Angiosperms
- Clade: Eudicots
- Clade: Asterids
- Order: Asterales
- Family: Asteraceae
- Genus: Sonchus
- Species: S. palmensis

Binomial name
- Sonchus palmensis (Sch.Bip.) Boulos 1967

Synonyms
- Sonchus pinnatus var. palmensis

= Sonchus palmensis =

La Palma sow-thistle

Species of flowering plant in the daisy family

Sonchus palmensis, the La Palma sow-thistle, is a plant endemic to the Canary Island of La Palma.

== Description ==
Tall shrub up to 2 m (6 ft 7 in). Leaves pinnatisect with 10–15 pairs of equally spaced lobes, the lobes 6–40 mm wide. Inflorescence very large and dense, compound-corymbose. Individual heads with 30–50 yellow ray florets but no disc florets.

== Distribution in La Palma ==
Widespread especially along the east coast, Fuencaliente, Mazo, Santa Cruz, Las Breñas, Puntallana, La Galga, Los Tilos, etc. west coast, Los Llanos, etc., up to 1,000 m (3,300 ft) in the lower and forest zones.

== Gallery ==
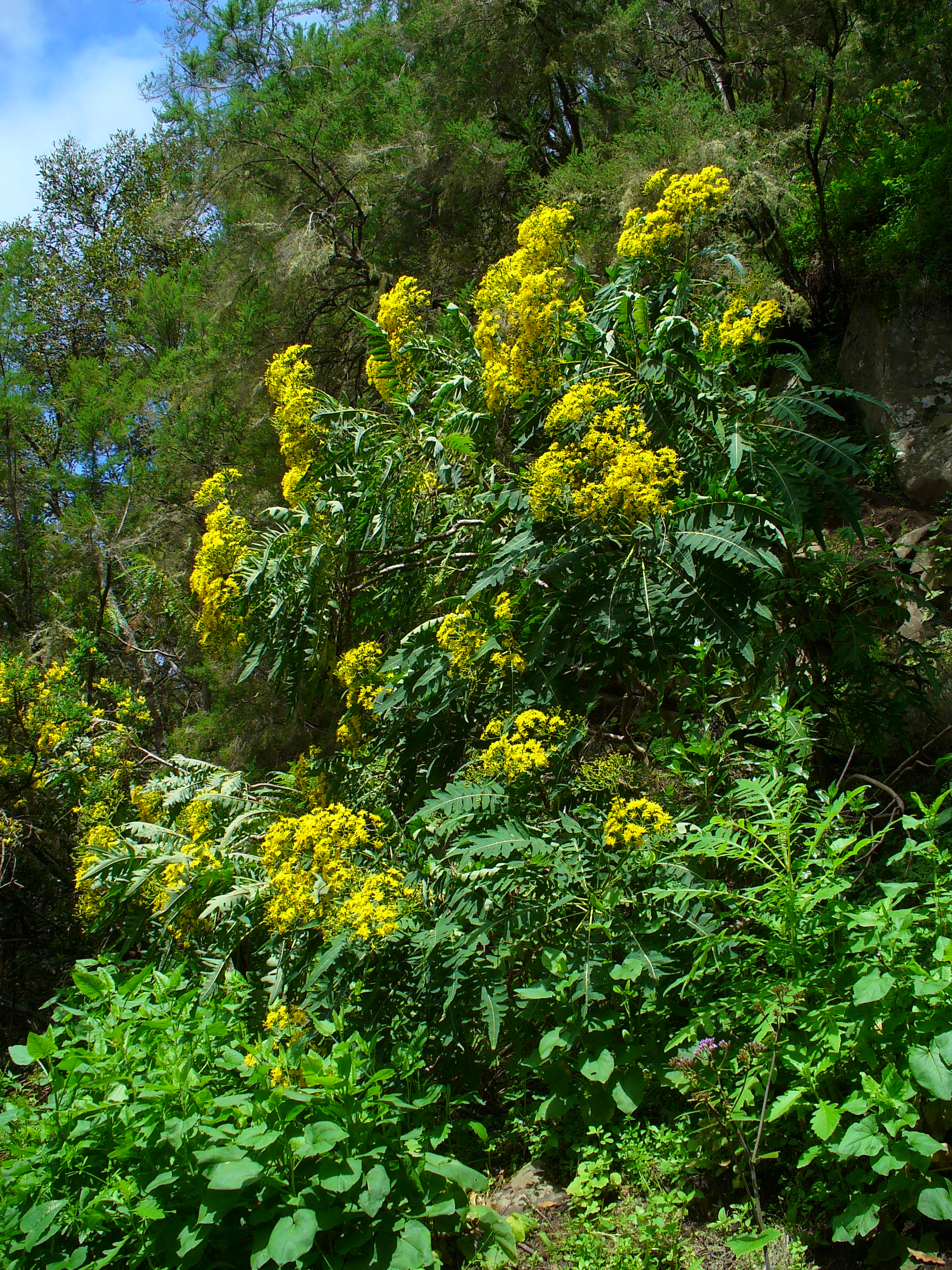

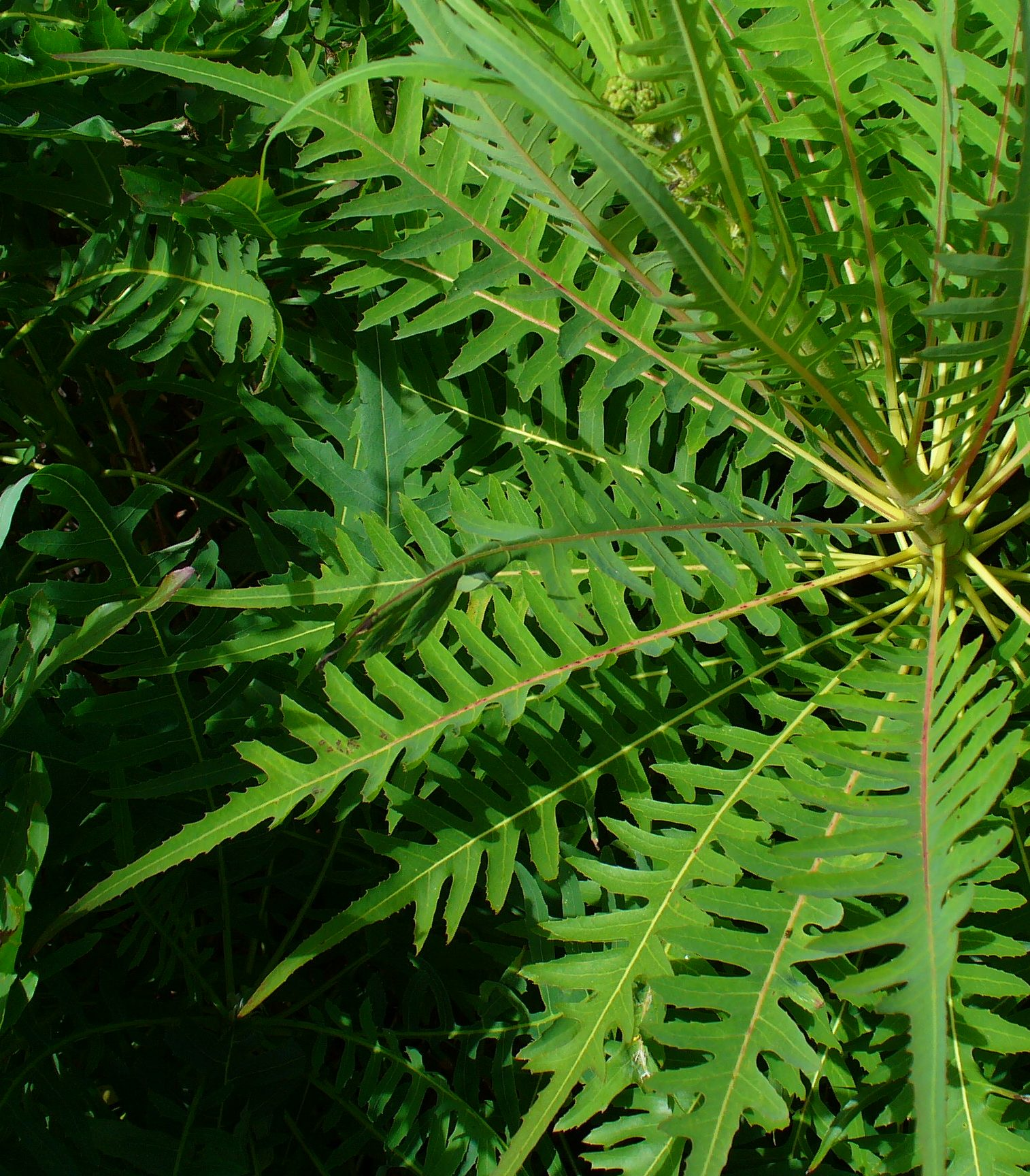

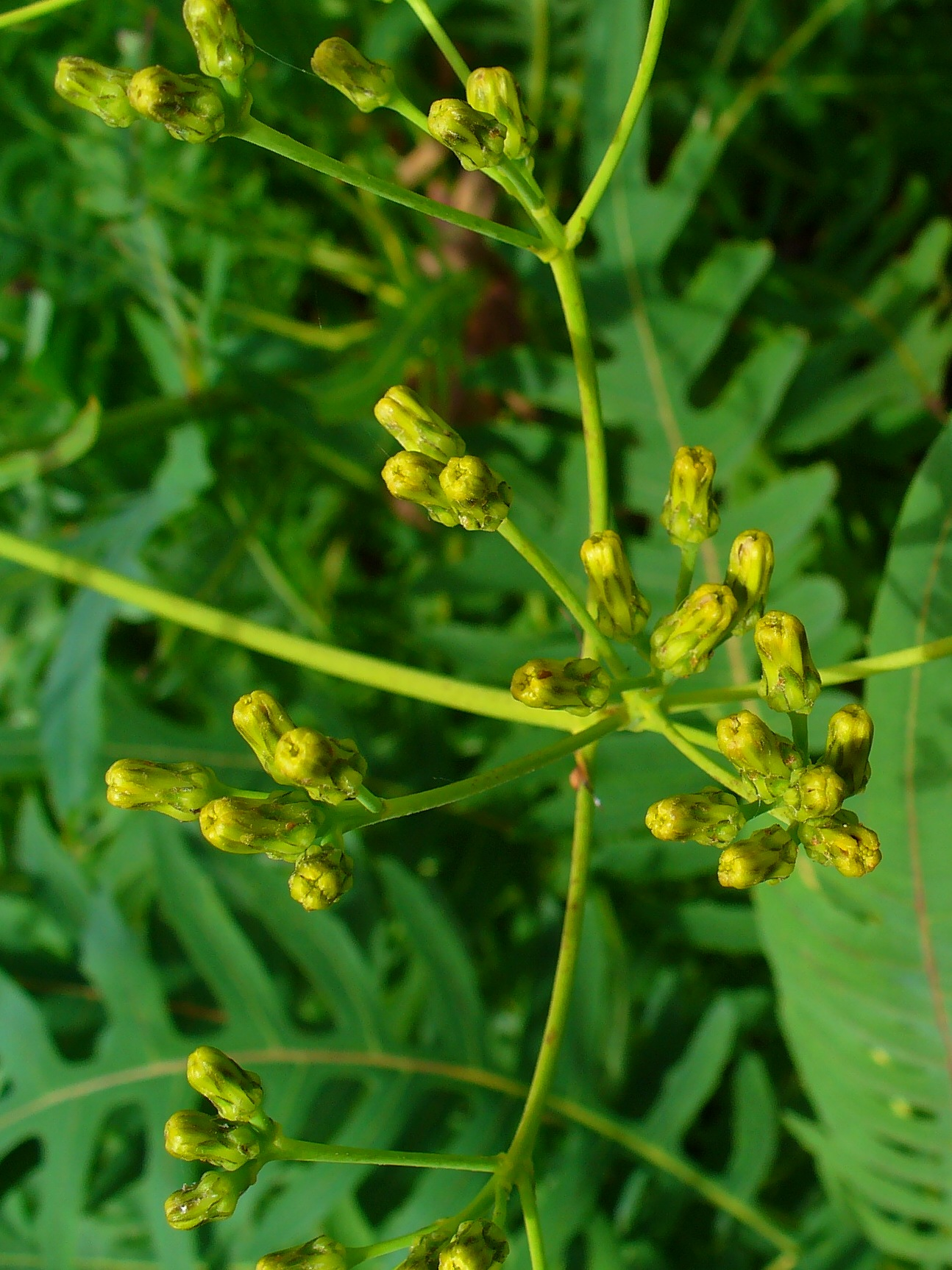

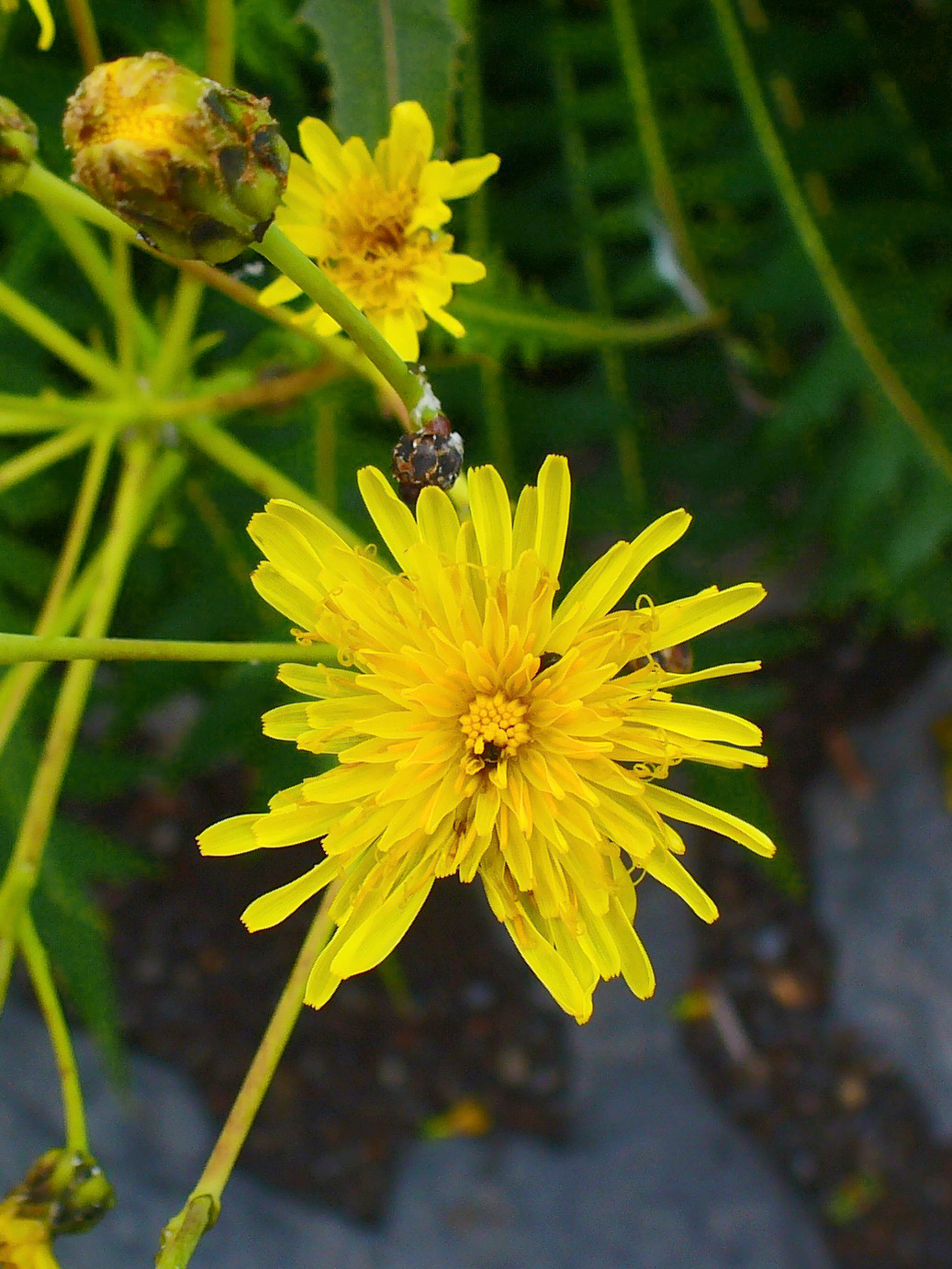

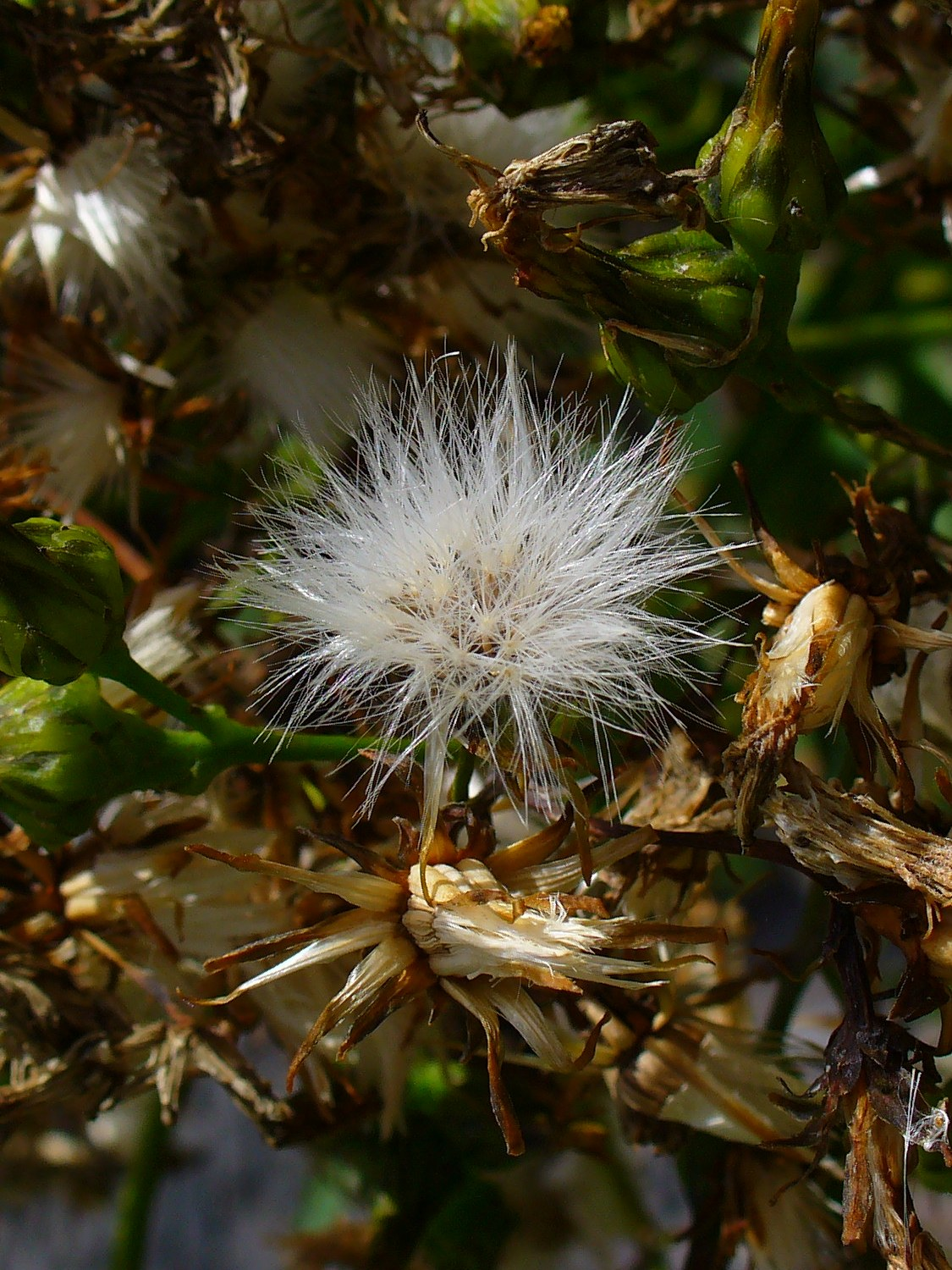

La Palma
