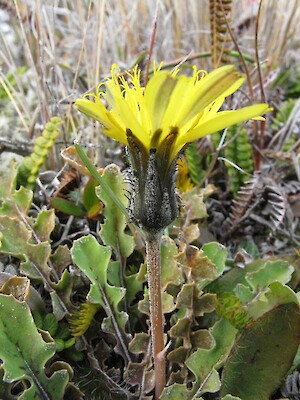

Conservation status
- Nationally Vulnerable (NZ TCS)

Scientific classification
- Kingdom: Plantae
- Clade: Tracheophytes
- Clade: Angiosperms
- Clade: Eudicots
- Clade: Asterids
- Order: Asterales
- Family: Asteraceae
- Genus: Sonchus
- Species: S. novae-zelandiae

Binomial name
- Sonchus novae-zelandiae (Hook.f.) B.D.Jacks.

= Sonchus novae-zelandiae =

Dryland sow thistle

Species of flowering plant

Sonchus novae-zelandiae, commonly known as the dryland sow thistle, is a species of thistle in the family Asteraceae. It is endemic to the South Island of New Zealand and it is considered to be an endangered species.

== Taxonomy ==
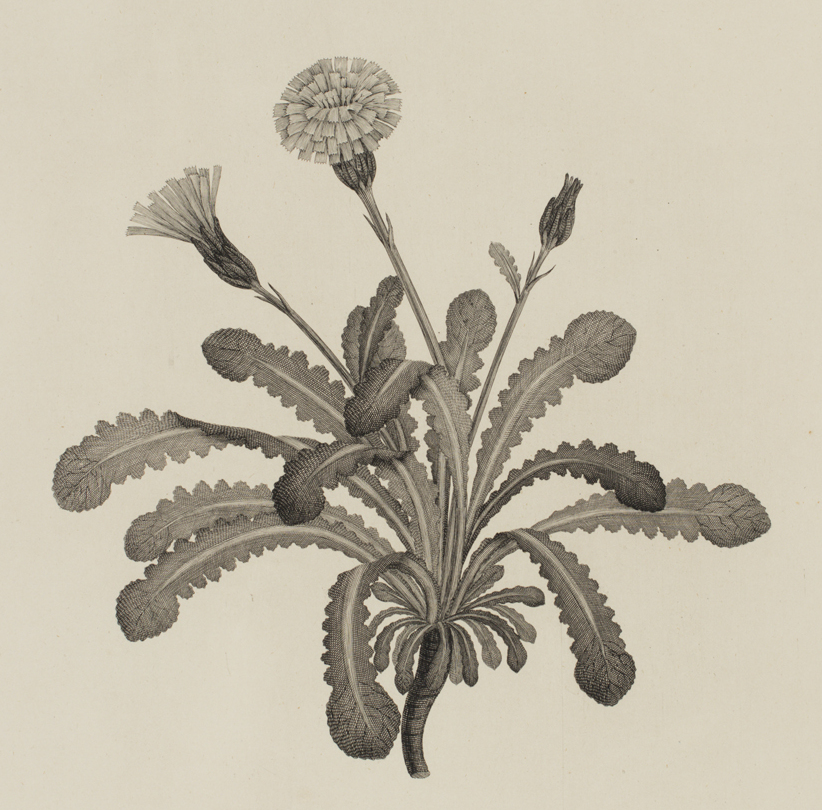
1895 engraving of the species (labelled as Kirkianella novae-zelandiae)

The name Sonchus novae-zelandiae was first published in the second volume of Index Kewensis in 1895. It was previously included in the genus Crepis under the synonym Crepis novae-zelandiae and Kirkianella as Kirkianella novae-zelandiae. The name Kirkianella novae-zelandiae was invalidly published in 1961 because no type specimen was designated, and was therefore not accepted. The taxon Kirkianella and several other genera were definitively included within Sonchus in 2014. Thus, the combination of Sonchus novae-zelandiae was confirmed.

== Description ==
The species has a 15 centimeter tall scape, or leafless stalk, and a thick taproot that often yields multiple flowerheads. The rosette is dense and has leaves that are split but not completely divided, each with a single flower. Sonchus novae-zelandiae demonstrates a wide variety of appearances based on where the plant is from. The species has a chromosome number of 2n = 90, 126.

== Ecology ==
Sonchus novae-zelandiae is endemic to the South Island of New Zealand. It is found in stony habitats like rocky slops and crevices. The New Zealand Plant Conservation Network has assessed the vulnerability of the species several times. It was noted that the population of dryland sow thistle was sparse in 2004. In 2007, 2012, and 2017 the species was assessed as Nationally Vulnerable. The plant is declining in much of its range, and is possibly being forced out by Pilosella.
