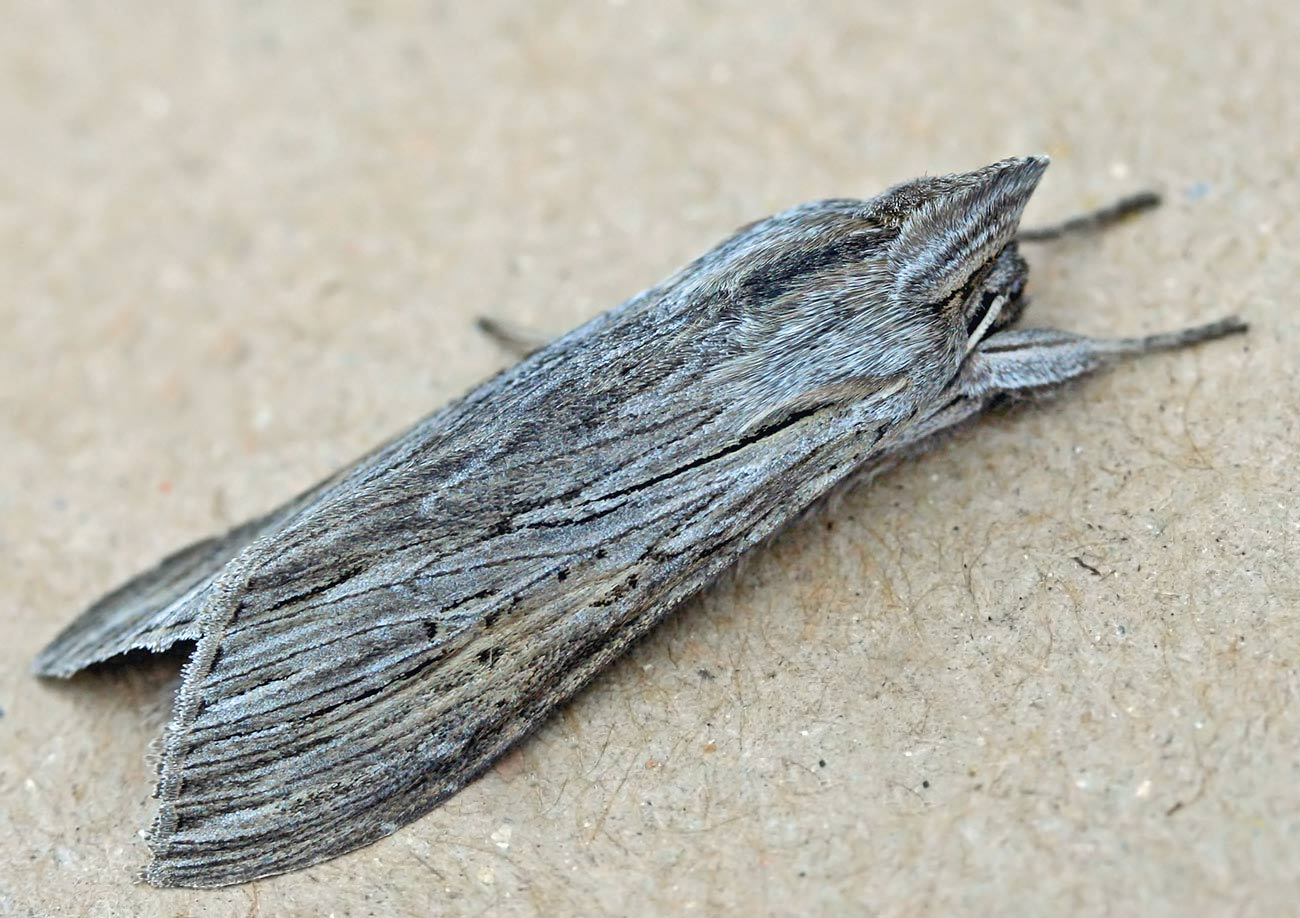

Scientific classification
- Kingdom: Animalia
- Phylum: Arthropoda
- Clade: Pancrustacea
- Class: Insecta
- Order: Lepidoptera
- Superfamily: Noctuoidea
- Family: Noctuidae
- Genus: Cucullia
- Species: C. umbratica

Binomial name
- Cucullia umbratica (Linnaeus, 1758)

Synonyms
- Phalaena umbratica Linnaeus, 1758

= Shark (moth) =

Species of moth

The shark (Cucullia umbratica) is a moth of the family Noctuidae. The species was first described by Carl Linnaeus in his landmark 1758 10th edition of Systema Naturae.

== Distribution ==
This species is widespread throughout much of the Palearctic realm (Europe, Russia, Afghanistan, Turkestan, and Mongolia), but has recently also been reported from North America, from the Magdalen Islands in Canada.

== Habitat ==
These moths inhabit a range of open environments such as heaths, meadows, forest edges, gardens, parks and suburban areas.

== Technical description ==
Cucullia umbratica is a fairly large species, with a wingspan of 52–59 millimetres (2.0–2.3 in). These moths have long, narrow wings giving a streamlined appearance. The forewings are dull brownish grey, the cell and space beyond are paler, with dull greyish buff. A fine black line runs from the base below cell. The usual lines and stigmata are ill defined. Orbicular is represented by two or three dark points, reniform by a curved black line at lower end. Slight black dashes are present before termen, above vein 3 and below vein 2, and a longer black streak appears above middle of vein 4. The hindwings of male are white, with the veins and termen narrowly fuscous, while in the female they are wholly brown, with paler base. The larva is grey or brown with black spots.

This species is quite similar to the chamomile shark (Cucullia chamomillae), but it shows two bands, one pale and one grey, on the fringe of the hindwing, whereas in the last there are three bands.

== Biology ==
Adults fly in the dusk and in the evening from mid-May to mid-August and feed on nectar of a variety of flowers. They are attracted to light. Larvae feed mainly on sow thistles and lettuces and others. The main recorded food plants are lady's bedstraw (Galium), hawkweed (Hieracium), catsear (Hypochaeris), lettuce (Lactuca), hawkbit (Leontodon), campion (Silene), sow thistle (Sonchus) and dandelion (Taraxacum). There is one generation per year (univoltine species). This species overwinters as a pupa.

1. The flight season refers to the British Isles. This may vary in other parts of the range.

== Gallery ==
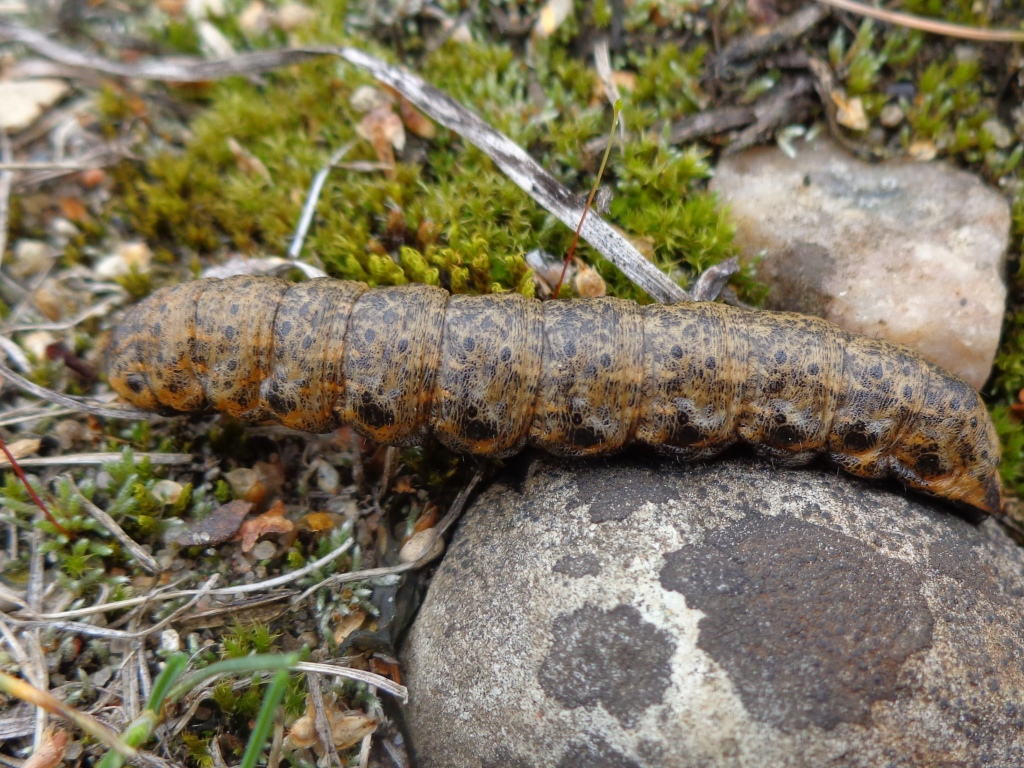
Caterpillar

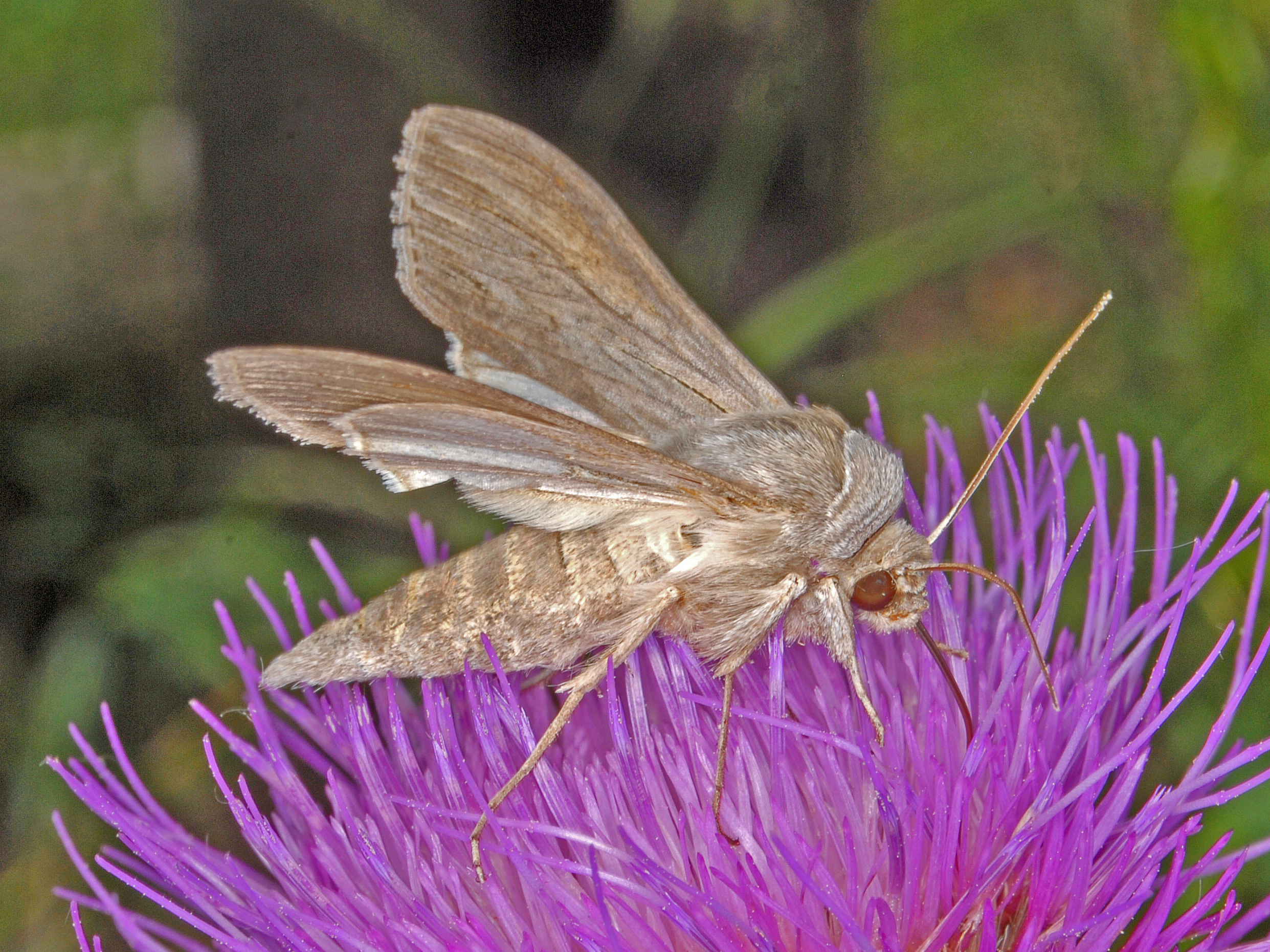
Imago

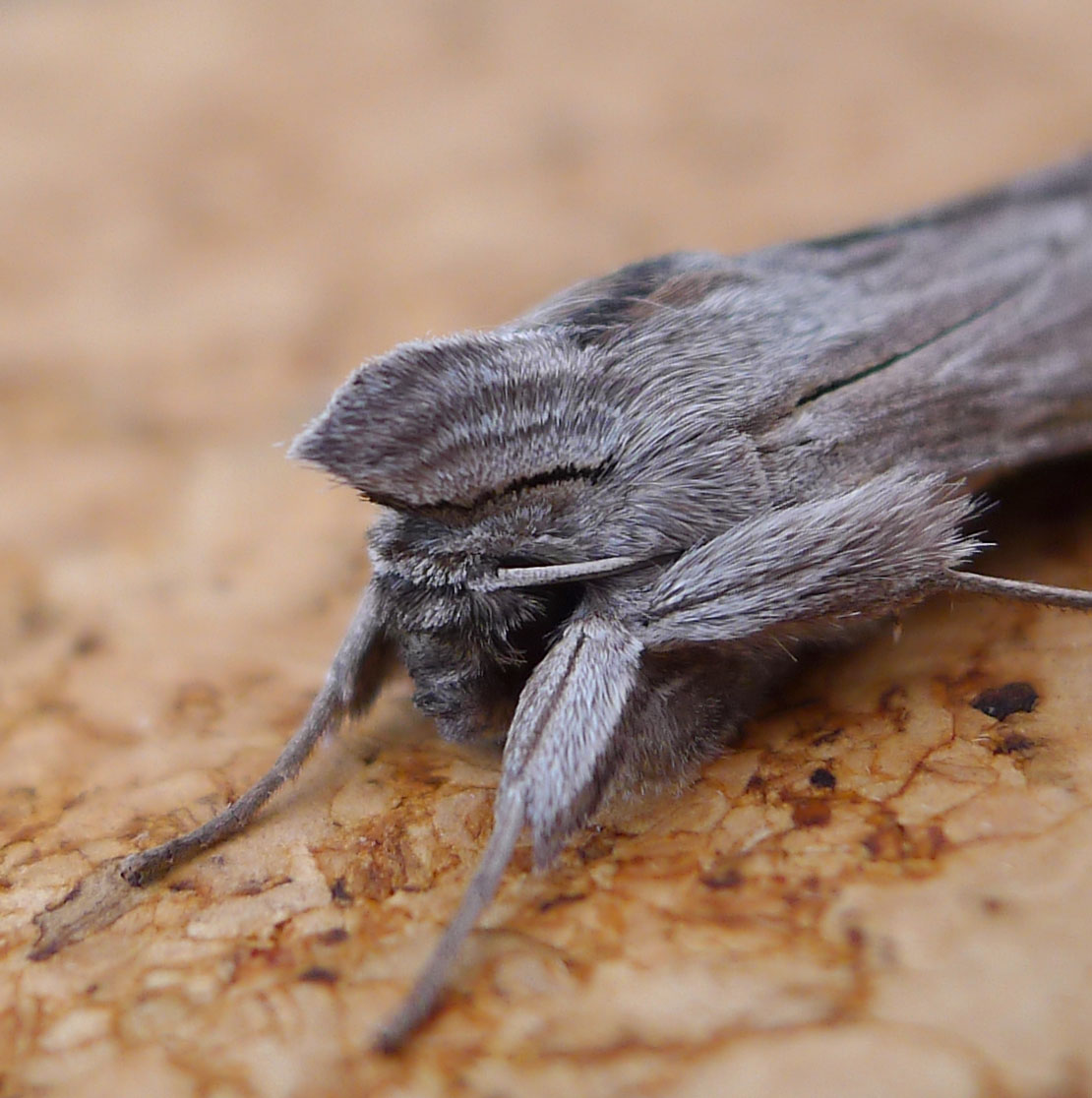
Head detail

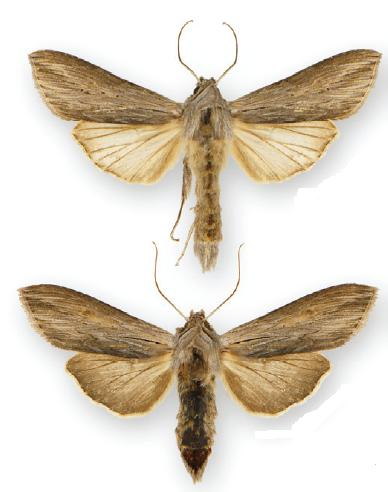
Mounted specimen - male (top) and female
