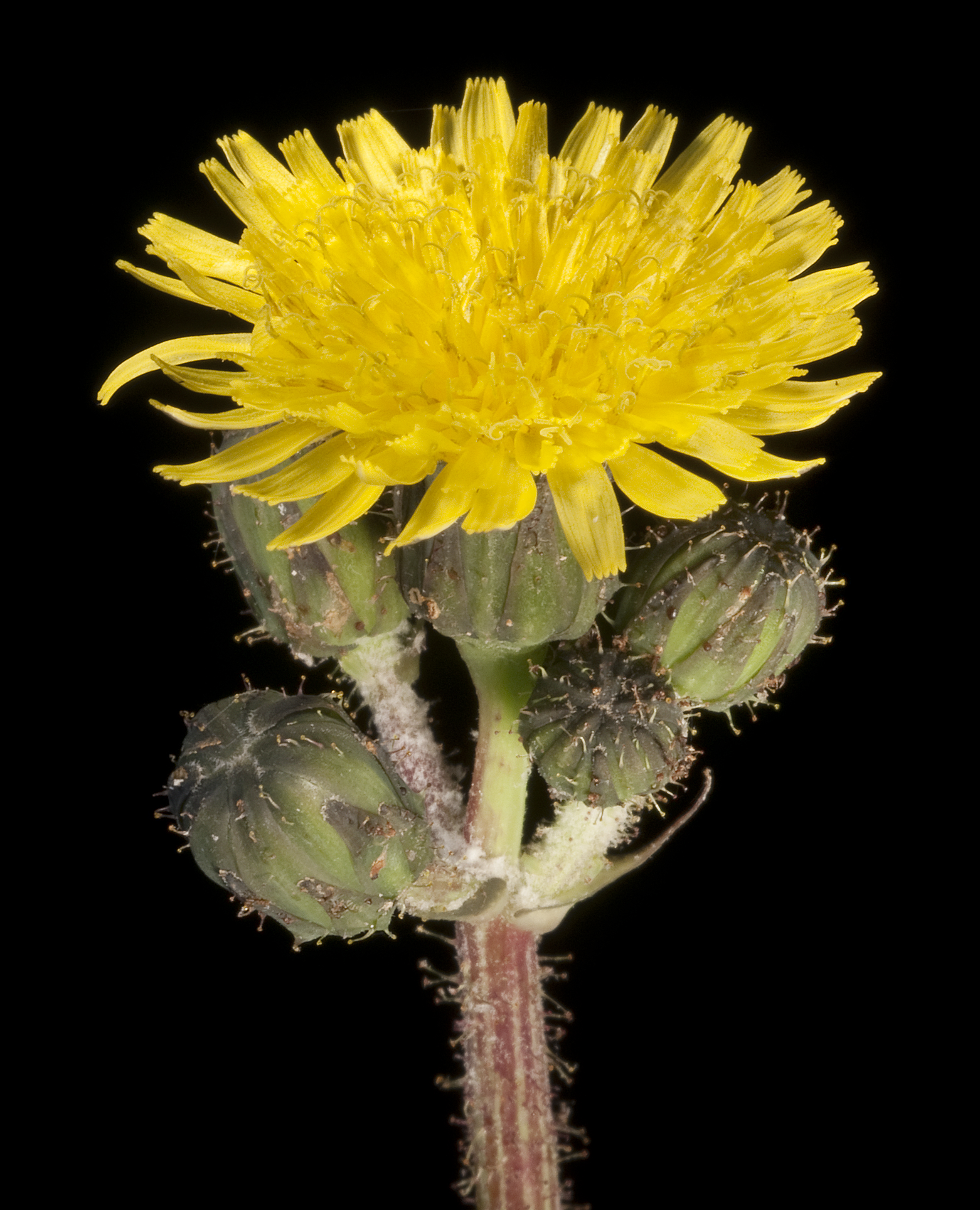

Conservation status
- Data Deficient (TPWCA)

Scientific classification
- Kingdom: Plantae
- Clade: Tracheophytes
- Clade: Angiosperms
- Clade: Eudicots
- Clade: Asterids
- Order: Asterales
- Family: Asteraceae
- Genus: Sonchus
- Species: S. hydrophilus

Binomial name
- Sonchus hydrophilus Boulos

= Sonchus hydrophilus =

Species of plant

Sonchus hydrophilus is a species of flowering plant in the family Asteraceae which is native to Australia and New Guinea. It was first described in 1965 by Loutfy Boulos.

Its conservatation status in the Northern Territory is "data deficient".
