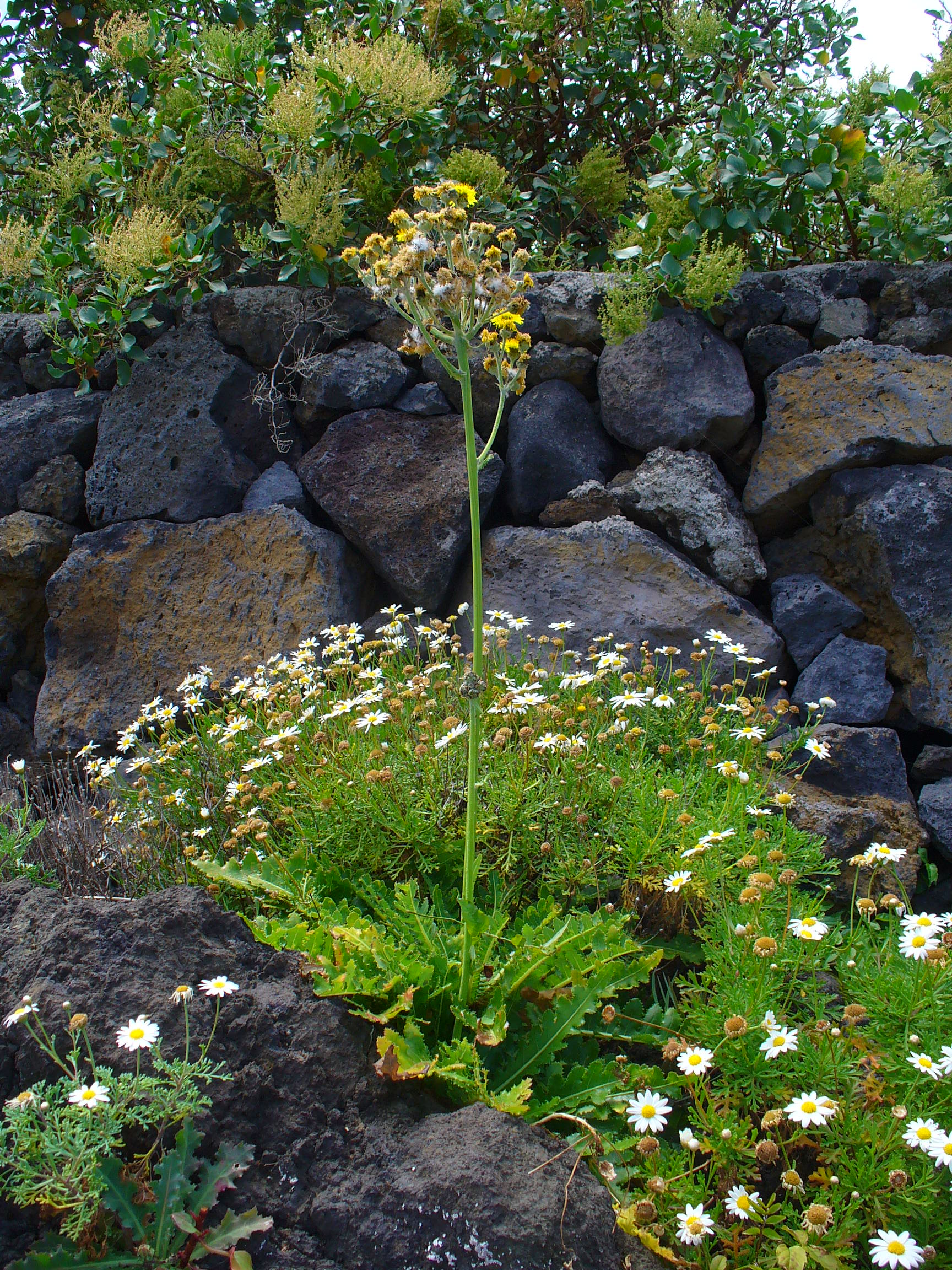

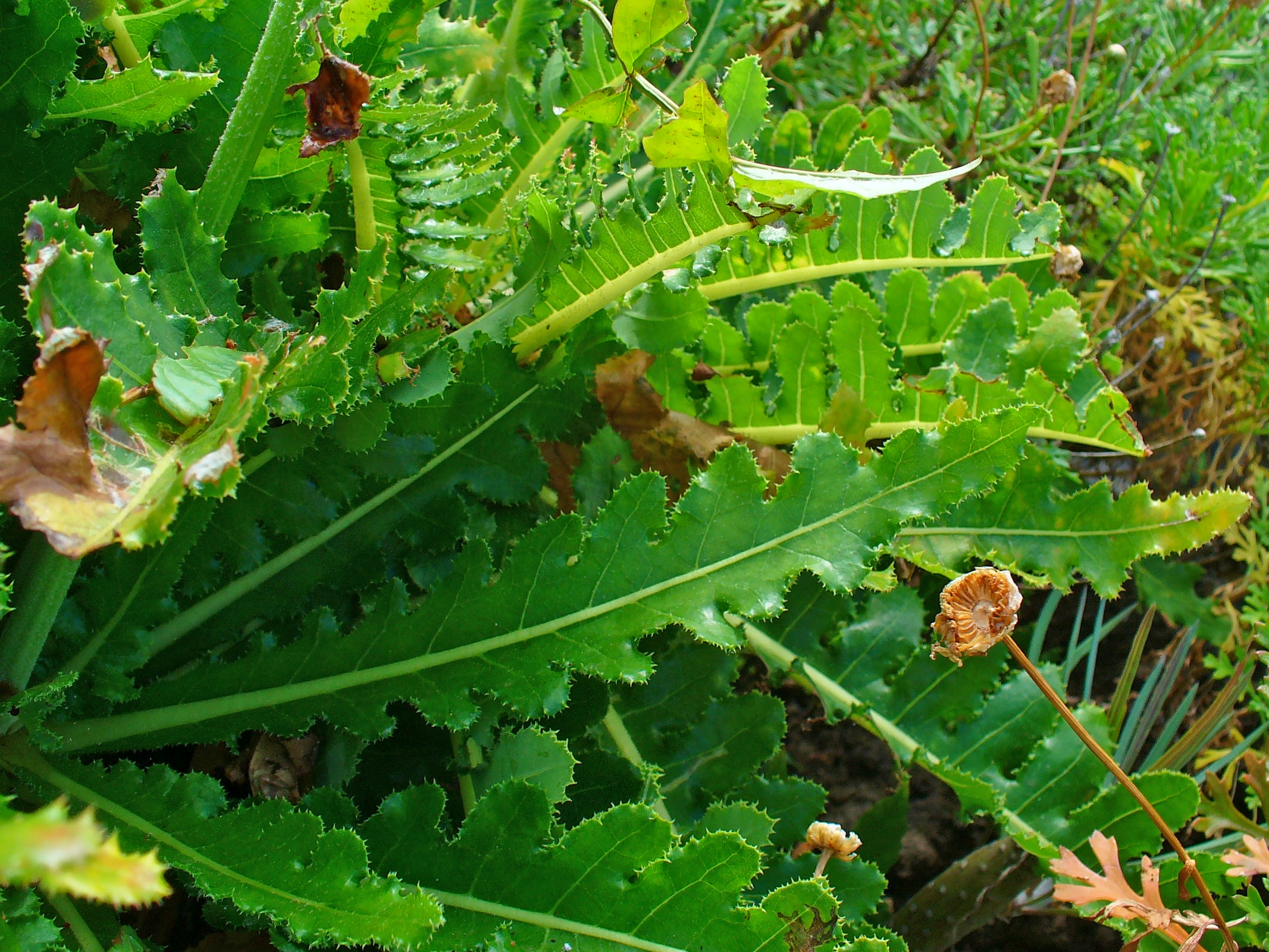

Scientific classification
- Kingdom: Plantae
- Clade: Tracheophytes
- Clade: Angiosperms
- Clade: Eudicots
- Clade: Asterids
- Order: Asterales
- Family: Asteraceae
- Genus: Sonchus
- Species: S. bornmuelleri

Binomial name
- Sonchus bornmuelleri Pitard.

= Sonchus bornmuelleri =

Bornmueller's sow-thistle

Species of flowering plant

Sonchus bornmuelleri, or Bornmueller's sow-thistle, is a plant endemic to the Canary Island of La Palma.

== Description ==
Perennial with woody stock. Leaves in a basal rosette, pinnatifid with rounded lobes; margins subspinose. Scape up to 80 cm, with a few small bracts. Inflorescence a dense corymb of up to 20 heads. Heads densely tomentose.

== Distribution in La Palma ==
Cliffs south of Santa Cruz de La Palma, coastal rocks near San Andrés y Los Sauces, lots pedregale (between the lighthouse and piscinas fajanas), Riscos de Bajamar, Garafia, Montaña del Viento, Mazo, Fuencaliente, etc., up to 200 m, rare.
