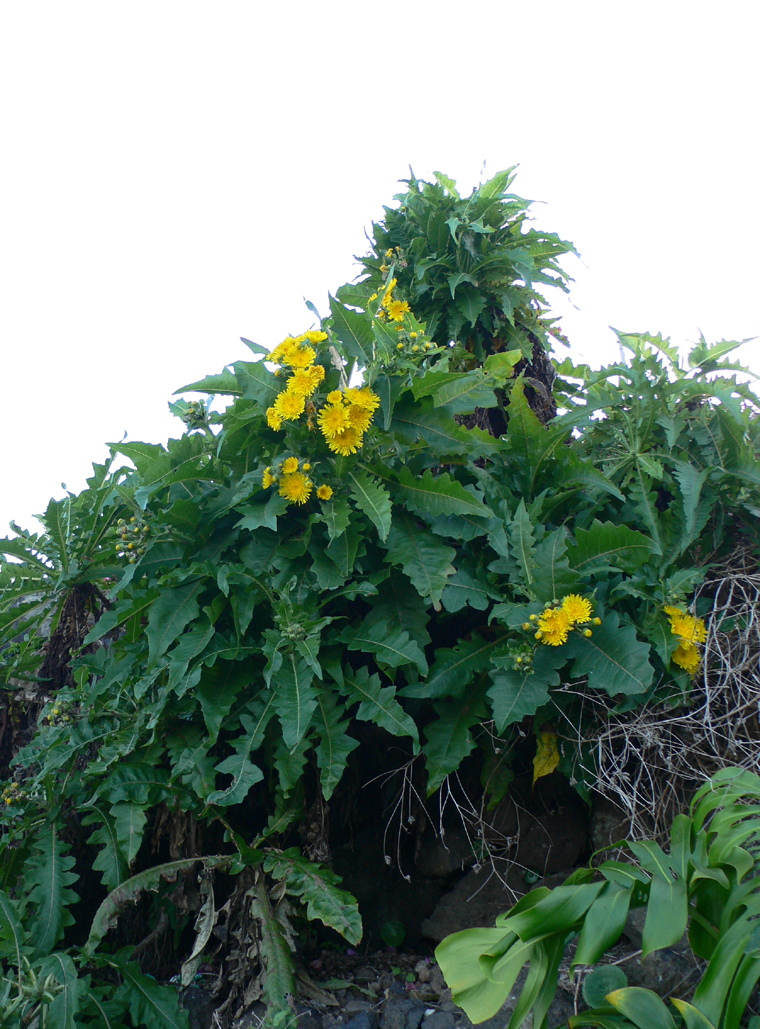
- At Garachico (Tenerife)

Scientific classification
- Kingdom: Plantae
- Clade: Tracheophytes
- Clade: Angiosperms
- Clade: Eudicots
- Clade: Asterids
- Order: Asterales
- Family: Asteraceae
- Genus: Sonchus
- Species: S. congestus

Binomial name
- Sonchus congestus Willd.

Synonyms
- Sonchus abbreviatus Link; Sonchus broussonetii Desf.; Sonchus jacquinii DC.; Sonchus macranthus Poir.

= Sonchus congestus =

Species of flowering plant

Sonchus congestus is a species of flowering plant in the family Asteraceae. It is endemic to the Canary Islands (Gran Canaria, Tenerife and Lanzarote).

== Description ==
Sonchus congestus is a shrub up to 1 m (3.3 ft) tall. The leaves form a rosette at the ends of the stems. The leaves are relatively smooth (subglabrous), and have triangular to rounded lobes along their length. The flower heads are large, up to 4–5 cm (1.6–2.0 in) across.

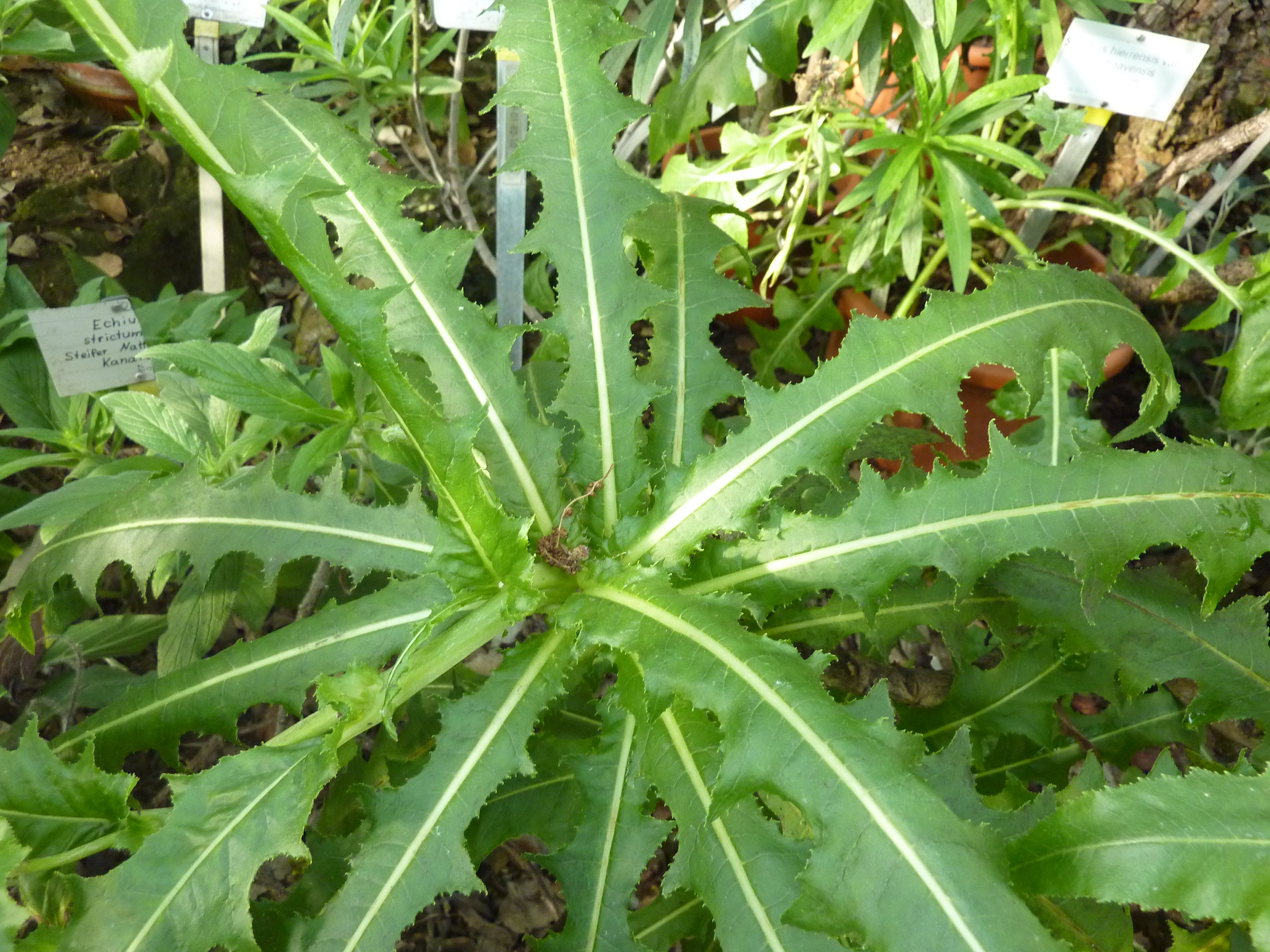
Leaf rosette

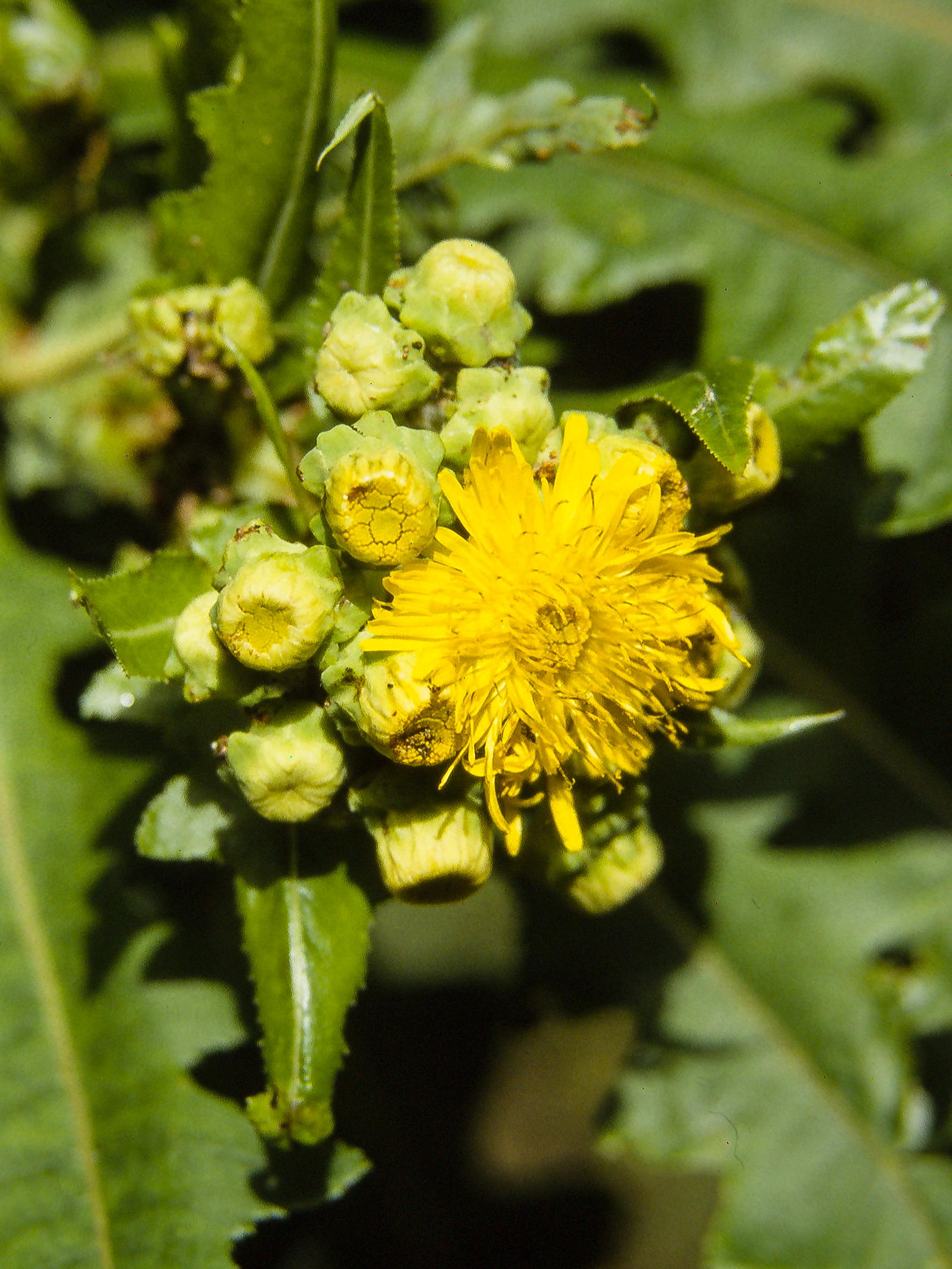
Inflorescences

== Distribution ==
Sonchus congestus is endemic to the Canary Islands. In Tenerife, it is found in forested areas in Sierra Anaga and along the north coast at elevations of 100–800 m (330–2,620 ft). It is also found in the central and northern regions of Gran Canaria.
