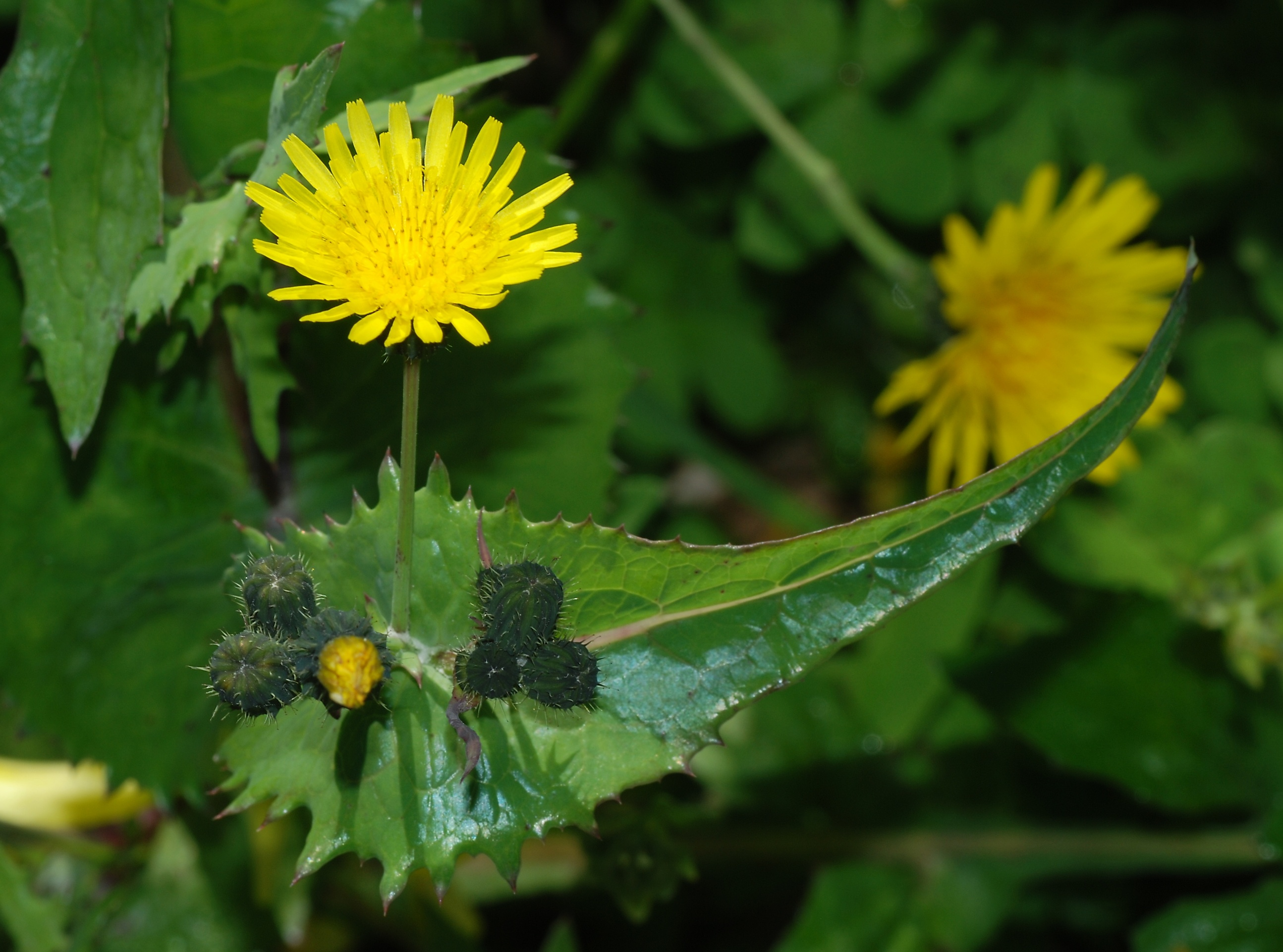
- Sonchus oleraceus

Scientific classification
- Kingdom: Plantae
- Clade: Tracheophytes
- Clade: Angiosperms
- Clade: Eudicots
- Clade: Asterids
- Order: Asterales
- Family: Asteraceae
- Subfamily: Cichorioideae
- Tribe: Cichorieae
- Subtribe: Hyoseridinae
- Genus: Sonchus; L.

Type species
- Sonchus oleraceus L.

Subgenera
- S. subg. Dendroseris; S. subg. Dendrosonchus; S. subg. Origosonchus; S. subg. Sonchus

Synonyms
- Chrysoprenanthes (Sch.Bip.) Bramwell; Kirkianella Allan; Sonchidium Pomel; Taeckholmia Boulos; Atalanthus D.Don; Wildpretia U.Reifenb. & A.Reifenb.; Aetheorhiza Cass.; Embergeria Boulos; Phoenicoseris (Skottsb.) Skottsb.; Babcockia Boulos; Trachodes D.Don; Actites Lander; Sonchoseris Fourr.; Lactucosonchus (Sch.Bip.) Svent.; Acanthosonchus (Sch.Bip.) Kirp.; Sventenia Font Quer

= Sonchus =

Sow thistles

Genus of flowering plants in the daisy family

Sonchus is a genus of flowering plants in the tribe Cichorieae within the family Asteraceae and are commonly known as sow thistles (less commonly hare thistles or hare lettuces). Sowthistles are annual, biennial or perennial herbs, with or without rhizomes and a few are even woody (subgenus Dendrosonchus, restricted to the Canary Islands and Madeira).

== Description ==
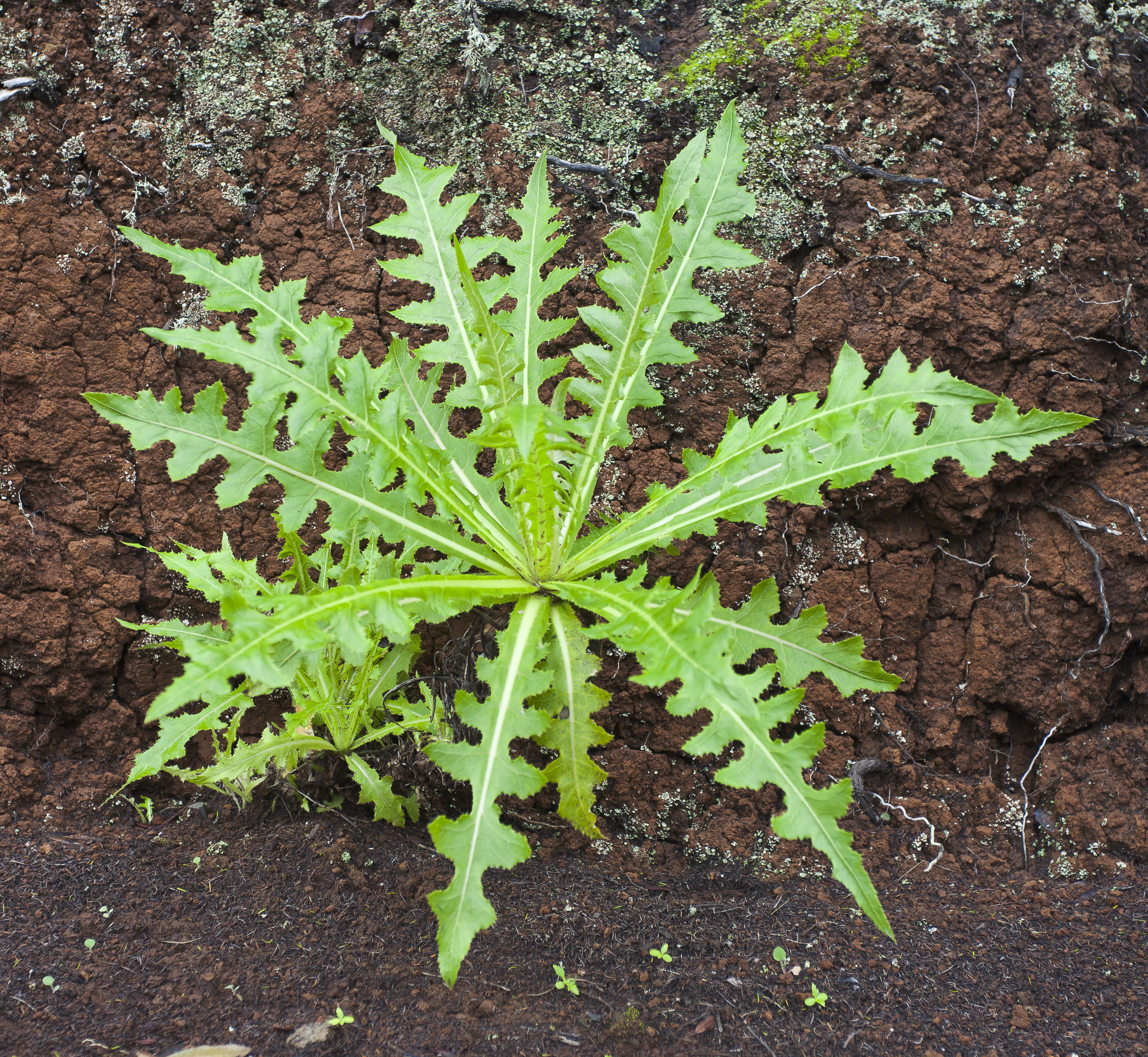
Sonchus hierrensis in the Canary Island of La Gomera

The genus is named after the Ancient Greek for such plants, σόγχος. All are characterized by soft, somewhat irregularly lobed leaves that clasp the stem and, at least initially, form a basal rosette. The stem contains a milky latex. Flower heads are yellow and range in size from half to one inch in diameter; the florets are all of ray type. Sonchus fruits are single-seeded, dry and indehiscent. Sow thistles are common roadside plants, and while native to Eurasia and tropical Africa, they are found almost worldwide in temperate regions.

Mature sow thistle stems can range from 30 cm to 2 m (1 to 6 ft) tall, depending upon species and growing conditions. Coloration ranges from green to purple in older plants. Sow thistles exude a milky latex when any part of the plant is cut or damaged, and it is from this fact that the plants obtained the common name, "sow thistle", as they were fed to lactating sows in the belief that milk production would increase. Sow thistles are known as "milk thistles" in some regions, although milk thistle more commonly refers to the genus Silybum.

=== Comparison with dandelions ===
They superficially resemble and are in the same family as dandelions, and even have pappus-like structures resembling dandelion seeds. However, they are usually taller than dandelions, have multiple flowers per stem (as opposed to one flower per dandelion), and have more irregularly shaped lobes.

== Species ==
The following 106 species are accepted by Plants of the World Online as of March 2023.

- Sonchus acaulis Dum.Cours.
- Sonchus x aemulus Merino
- Sonchus afromontanus R.E.Fr.
- Sonchus araraticus Nazarova & Barsegyan
- Sonchus arboreus DC.
- Sonchus arvensis L.
- Sonchus asper (L.) Hill
- Sonchus x beltraniae U.Reifenb. & A.Reifenb.
- Sonchus berteroanus (Decne.) S.C.Kim & Mejías
- Sonchus bipontini Asch.
- Sonchus bornmuelleri Pit.
- Sonchus bourgeaui Sch.Bip.
- Sonchus brachylobus Webb
- Sonchus brachyotus DC.
- Sonchus brassicifolius S.C.Kim & Mejías
- Sonchus briquetianus Gand.
- Sonchus bupleuroides (Font Quer) N.Kilian & Greuter
- Sonchus camporum (R.E.Fr.) Boulos ex C.Jeffrey
- Sonchus canariensis (Webb) Boulos
- Sonchus capillaris Svent.
- Sonchus cavanillesii Caball.
- Sonchus congestus Willd.
- Sonchus crassifolius Pourr. ex Willd.
- Sonchus daltonii Webb
- Sonchus dregeanus DC.
- Sonchus erzincanicus V.A.Matthews
- Sonchus esperanzae N.Kilian & Greuter
- Sonchus fauces-orci Knoche
- Sonchus fragilis Ball
- Sonchus friesii Boulos
- Sonchus fruticosus L.f.
- Sonchus gandogeri Pit.
- Sonchus gigas Boulos ex Humbert
- Sonchus gomeraensis Boulos
- Sonchus grandifolius Kirk
- Sonchus gummifer Link
- Sonchus heterophyllus (Boulos) U.Reifenb. & A.Reifenb.
- Sonchus hierrensis (Pit.) Boulos
- Sonchus hotha C.B.Clarke
- Sonchus hydrophilus Boulos
- Sonchus integrifolius Harv.
- Sonchus jacottetianus Thell.
- Sonchus jainii Chandrab., V.Chandras. & N.C.Nair
- Sonchus x jaquiniocephalus Svent.
- Sonchus kirkii Hamlin
- Sonchus laceratus (Phil.) S.C.Kim & Mejías
- Sonchus latifolius (Lowe) R.Jardim & M.Seq.
- Sonchus leptocephalus Cass.
- Sonchus lidii Boulos
- Sonchus lobatiflorus S.C.Kim & Mejías
- Sonchus luxurians (R.E.Fr.) C.Jeffrey
- Sonchus macrocarpus Boulos & C.Jeffrey
- Sonchus maculigerus H.Lindb.
- Sonchus malayanus Miq.
- Sonchus marginatus (Bertero ex Decne.) S.C.Kim & Mejías
- Sonchus maritimus L.
- Sonchus masguindalii Pau & Font Quer
- Sonchus mauritanicus Boiss. & Reut.
- Sonchus x maynari Svent.
- Sonchus megalocarpus (Hook.f.) J.M.Black
- Sonchus melanolepis Fresen.
- Sonchus micranthus (Bertero ex Decne.) S.C.Kim & Mejías
- Sonchus microcarpus (Boulos) U.Reifenb. & A.Reifenb.
- Sonchus microcephalus Mejías
- Sonchus nanus Sond. ex Harv.
- Sonchus neriifolius (Decne.) S.C.Kim & Mejías
- Sonchus novae-zelandiae (Hook.f.) B.D.Jacks. - also known as Kirkianella novae-zelandiae
- Sonchus x novocastellanus Cirujano
- Sonchus obtusilobus R.E.Fr.
- Sonchus oleraceus L.
- Sonchus ortunoi Svent.
- Sonchus palmensis (Webb) Boulos
- Sonchus palustris L.
- Sonchus parathalassius J.G.Costa ex R.Jardim & M.Seq.
- Sonchus pendulus (Sch.Bip.) Sennikov
- Sonchus phoeniciformis S.C.Kim & Mejías
- Sonchus pinnatifidus Cav.
- Sonchus pinnatus Aiton
- Sonchus pitardii Boulos
- Sonchus platylepis Webb & Berthel.
- Sonchus x prudhommei Bouchard
- Sonchus pruinatus (Johow) S.C.Kim & Mejías
- Sonchus pustulatus Willk.
- Sonchus radicatus Aiton
- Sonchus regis-jubae Pit.
- Sonchus regius (Skottsb.) S.C.Kim & Mejías
- Sonchus x rokosensis Sutorý
- Sonchus x rotundilobus Popov ex Kovalevsk.
- Sonchus x rupicola (Svent.) A.Santos & Mejías
- Sonchus saudensis Boulos
- Sonchus schweinfurthii Oliv. & Hiern
- Sonchus sinuatus S.C.Kim & Mejías
- Sonchus sosnowskyi Schchian
- Sonchus splendens S.C.Kim & Mejías
- Sonchus stenophyllus R.E.Fr.
- Sonchus suberosus Zohary & P.H.Davis
- Sonchus sventenii U.Reifenb. & A.Reifenb.
- Sonchus tectifolius Svent.
- Sonchus tenerrimus L.
- Sonchus transcaspicus Nevski
- Sonchus tuberifer Svent.
- Sonchus ustulatus Lowe
- Sonchus webbii Sch.Bip.
- Sonchus wightianus DC.
- Sonchus wildpretii U.Reifenb. & A.Reifenb.
- Sonchus wilmsii R.E.Fr.

== Invasive ==
In many areas sow thistles are considered noxious weeds, as they grow quickly in a wide range of conditions and their wind-borne seeds allow them to spread rapidly. Sonchus arvensis, the perennial sow thistle, is considered the most economically detrimental, as it can crowd commercial crops, is a heavy consumer of nitrogen in soils, may deplete soil water of land left to fallow, and can regrow and sprout additional plants from its creeping roots. However, sow thistles are easily uprooted by hand, and their soft stems present little resistance to slashing or mowing.

Most livestock will readily devour sow thistle in preference to grass, and this lettuce-relative is edible and nutritious to humans—in fact this is the meaning of the second part of the Latin name of the common sow thistle, oleraceus. Attempts at weed control by herbicidal use, to the neglect of other methods, may have led to a proliferation of these species in some environments.

== Cultivation and use as food ==
Sow thistles are common host plants for aphids. Gardeners may consider this a benefit or a curse; aphids may spread from sow thistle to other plants, but alternatively the sow thistle can encourage the growth of beneficial predators such as hoverflies. In this regard sow thistles make excellent sacrificial plants. Sonchus species are used as food plants by the larvae of some Lepidoptera including Celypha rufana and the broad-barred white, grey chi, nutmeg, and shark moths. The fly Tephritis formosa is known to attack the capitula of this plant.

Sow thistles have been used as fodder, particularly for rabbits, hence the other common names of "hare thistle" or "hare lettuce". They are also edible to humans as a leaf vegetable; old leaves and stalks can be bitter but young leaves have a flavour similar to lettuce. Going by the name pūhā or rareke (raraki) it is a traditional food eaten in New Zealand by Māori. When cooked the flavour is reminiscent of chard. The greens were also eaten by the indigenous people of North America. Edible raw when young, the older greens can also be eaten after cooking briefly.
