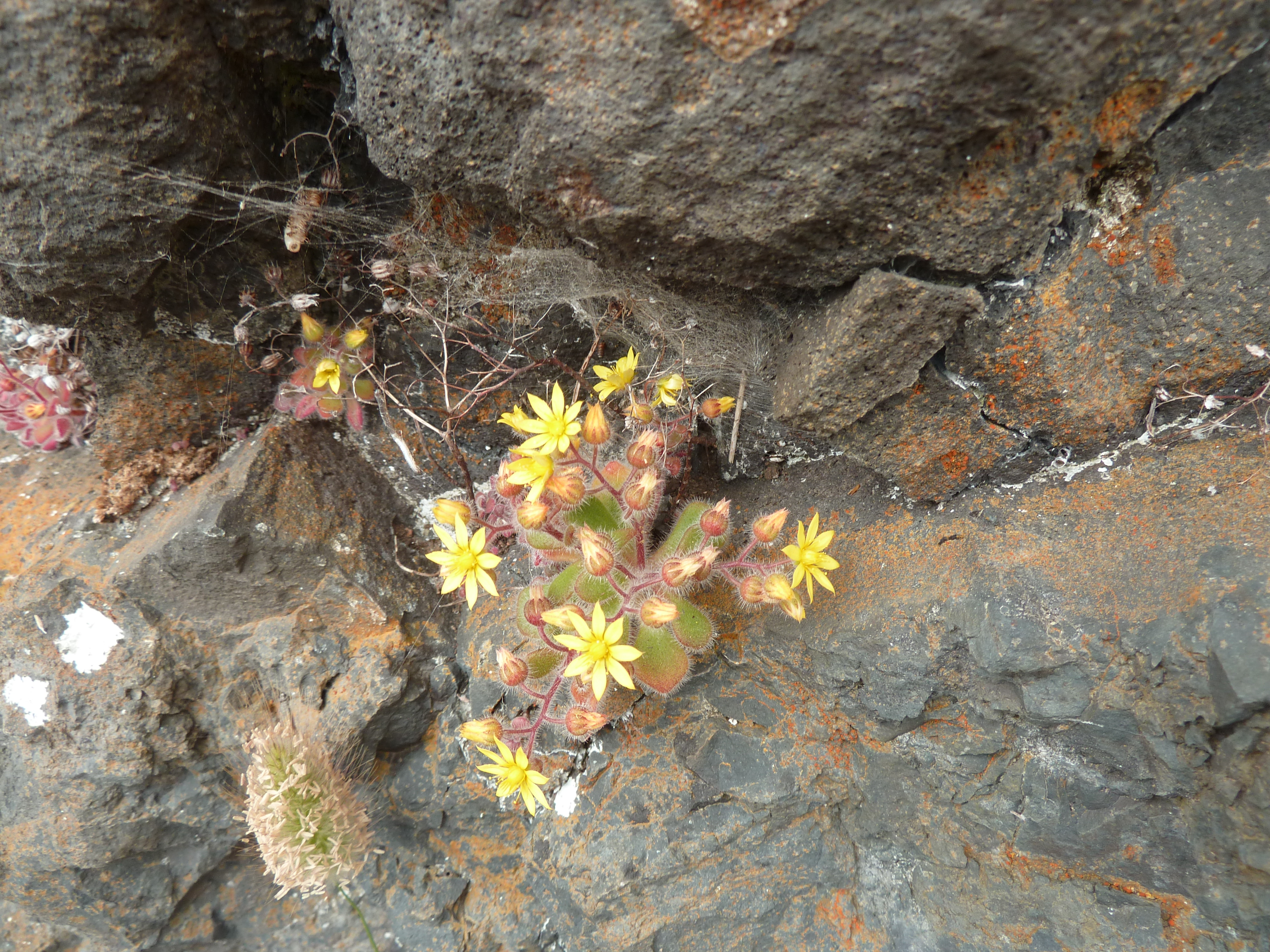

Scientific classification
- Kingdom: Plantae
- Clade: Embryophytes
- Clade: Tracheophytes
- Clade: Angiosperms
- Clade: Eudicots
- Order: Saxifragales
- Family: Crassulaceae
- Genus: Aichryson
- Species: A. villosum

Binomial name
- Aichryson villosum Webb & Berthel., 1840

Synonyms
- Aichryson radicescens Webb & Berthel, 1840; Sempervivum villosum Aiton, 1789

= Aichryson villosum =

Species of flowering plant

Aichryson villosum is a species of herbaceous flowering plants in the family Crassulaceae endemic to the Madeira Archipelago. The species was first described by Sabin Berthelot and Philip Barker-Webb in 1840, published in Natural History of the Canary Islands. Aichryson santamariensis was previously included in this species, but is now (since November 2015) considered a different species endemic to Santa Maria Island, Azores.
