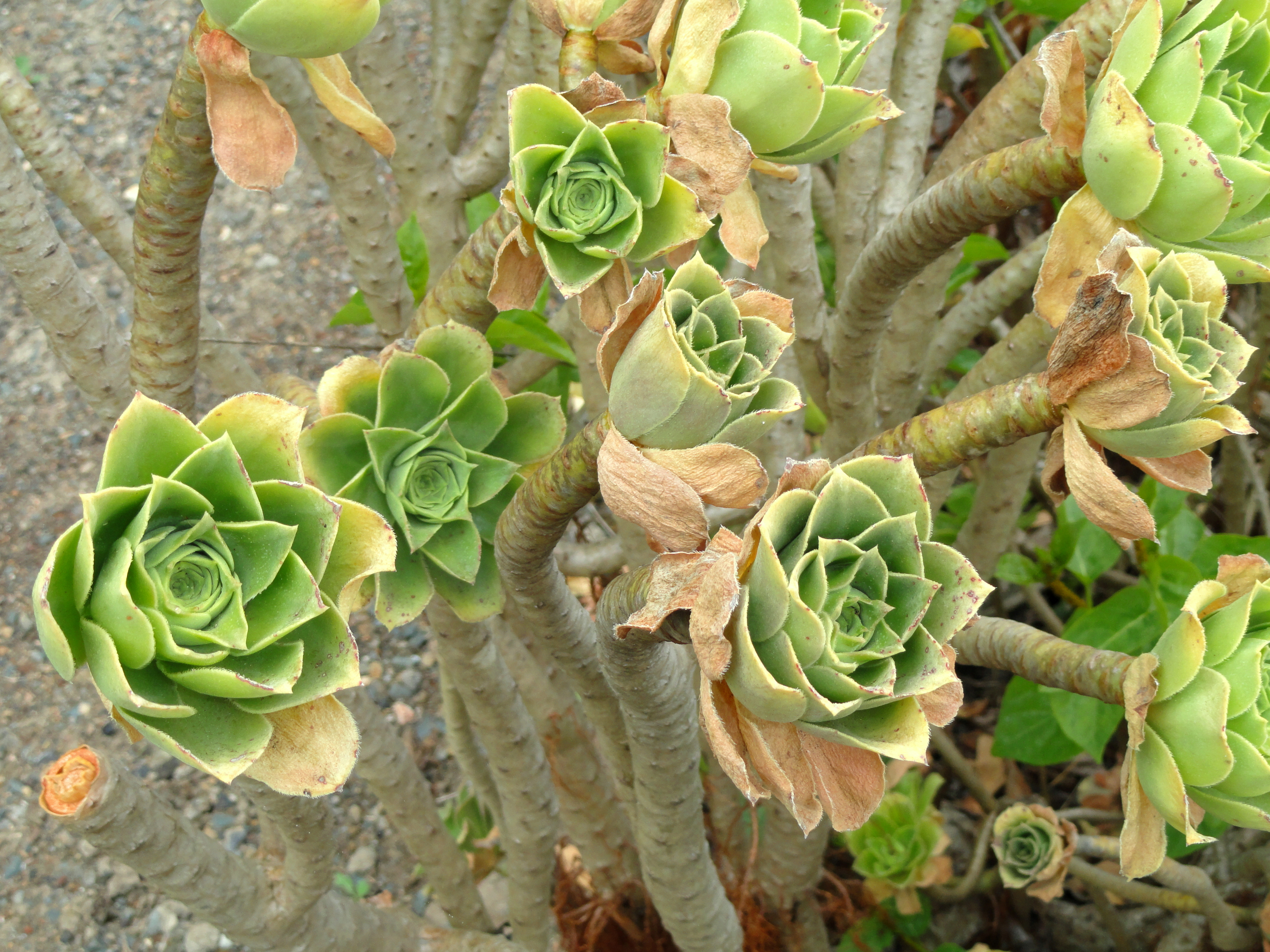
- Aeonium balsamiferum at the University of California Botanical Garden

Conservation status
- Vulnerable (IUCN 3.1)

Scientific classification
- Kingdom: Plantae
- Clade: Tracheophytes
- Clade: Angiosperms
- Clade: Eudicots
- Order: Saxifragales
- Family: Crassulaceae
- Genus: Aeonium
- Species: A. balsamiferum

Binomial name
- Aeonium balsamiferum Webb & Berthel., 1840

Synonyms
- Sempervivum balsamiferum Webb & Berthel.

= Aeonium balsamiferum =

Species of succulent

Aeonium balsamiferum (Spanish: bejeque farrobo) is a species of tropical flowering plant in the family Crassulaceae. The species is endemic in the Canary Islands.

== Taxonomy ==
The plant was first described by Philip Barker Webb and Sabin Berthelot, published in Natural History of the Canary Islands (Histoire Naturelle des Îles Canaries) in 1840.

== Description ==
It is a shrub with sticky leaves. The rosettes measure up to 20 cm (7.9 in) in diameter. It has light yellow flowers.

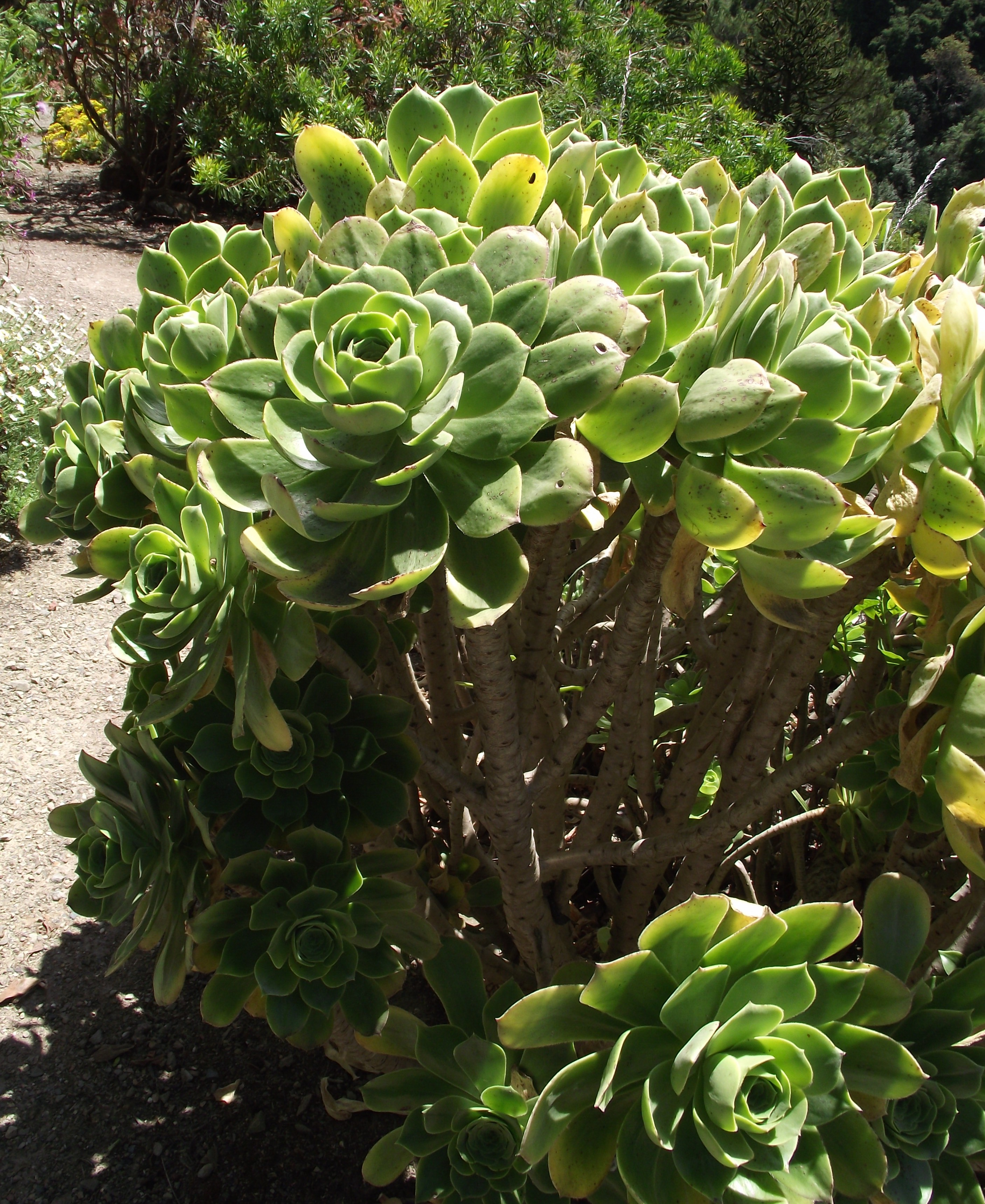
Aeonium balsamiferum

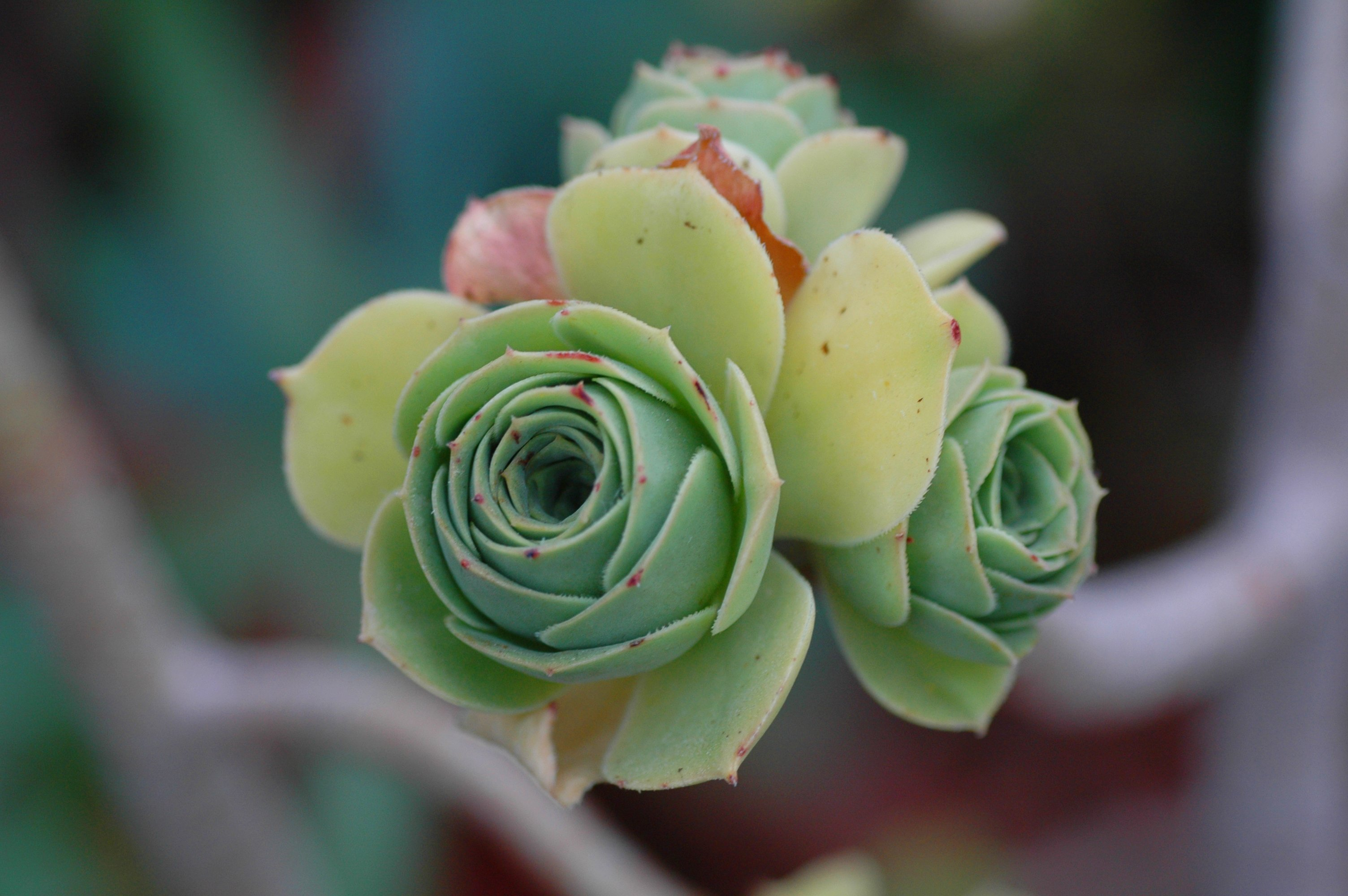
Details

== Distribution ==
Aeonium balsamiferum occurs in the eastern Canary Islands of Lanzarote (native) and Fuerteventura (naturalised), in shrublands and rocky areas.
