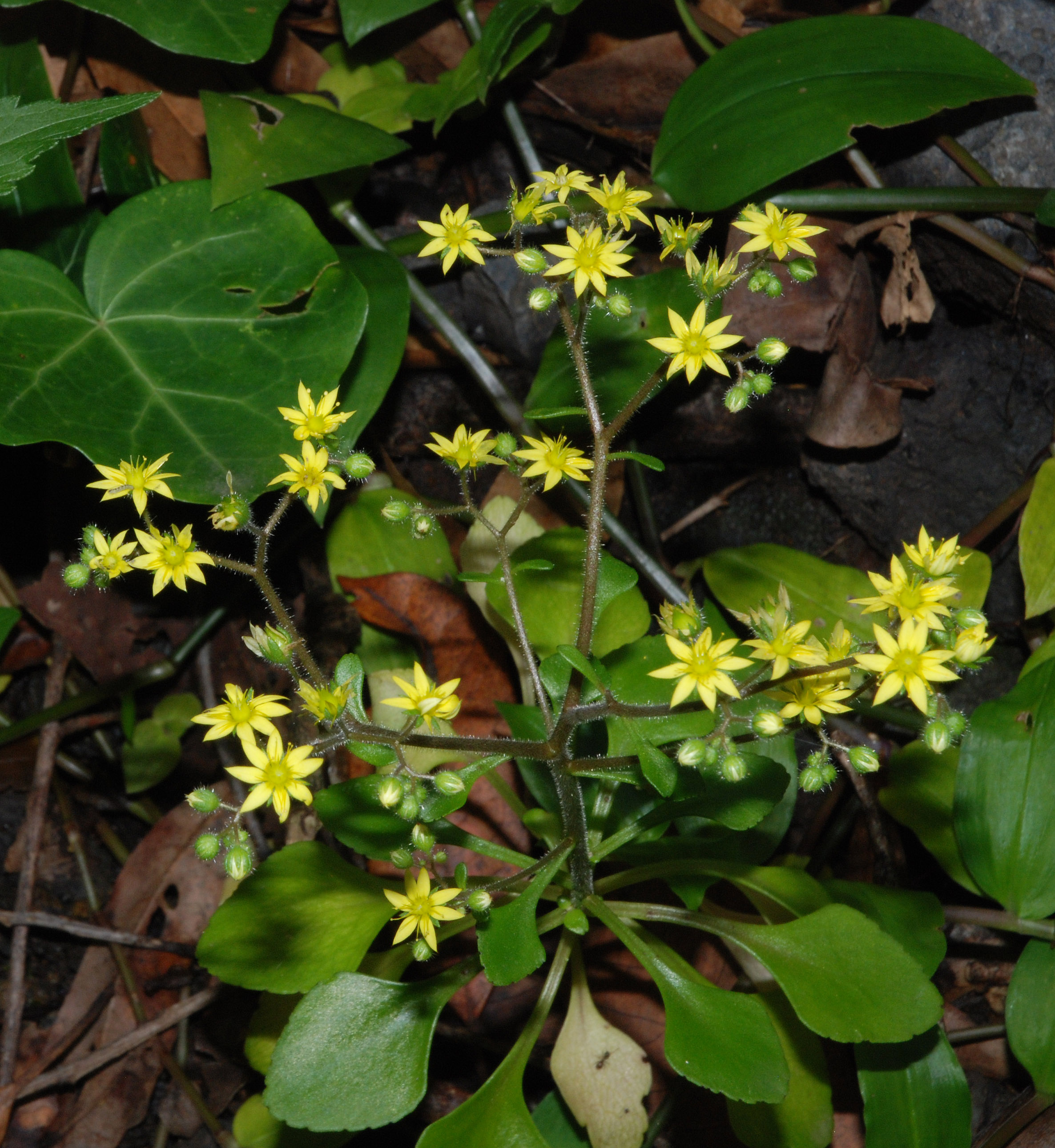
- Aichryson punctatum

Scientific classification
- Kingdom: Plantae
- Clade: Embryophytes
- Clade: Tracheophytes
- Clade: Angiosperms
- Clade: Eudicots
- Order: Saxifragales
- Family: Crassulaceae
- Subfamily: Sempervivoideae
- Tribe: Aeonieae
- Genus: Aichryson; Webb & Berthel.

Species
- 16; see text

Synonyms
- Macrobia (Webb & Berthel.) G.Kunkel

= Aichryson =

Genus of flowering plants

Aichryson is a genus of 16 species of succulent, subtropical plants, native to the Canary Islands, Azores, and Madeira.

The species of Aichryson are not frost-resistant. They are related to Sempervivum, Jovibarba, Greenovia, Aeonium and Monanthes, readily seen in their similar flowers.

The genus name comes from a contraction of the Greek "aei" (always) and "chrysos" (gold).

Several species are cultivated as ornamental plants. The hybrid cultivar Aichryson × aizoides var. domesticum 'Variegatum' is a recipient of the Royal Horticultural Society's Award of Garden Merit.

== Taxonomy ==
Recent phylogenetic studies of Crassulaceae indicate that Aichryson is closely related to Monanthes and Aeonium (both genera are also largely endemic to the Canary Islands). Two other genera of Crassulaceae that have many-parted (polymerous) flowers (Sempervivum and Jovibarba) are not closely related to the three Canary Island genera.

On the Canary Islands, the center of species diversity seems to be the island of La Palma.

Relationships within Aichryson were investigated by Fairfield et al. (2004) [Plant Systematics and Evolution 248: 71–83]. They found that the five subspecies of A. pachycaulon were not each other's closest relatives (monophyletic) and additional species may need to be erected after additional study.

== Species ==
16 species, and several naturally occurring interspecies hybrids, are accepted.

- Aichryson × aizoides (Lam.) E.C.Nelson
- Aichryson × azuajei Bañares
- Aichryson bitumosum Bañares
- Aichryson bollei Webb ex Bolle
- Aichryson × bramwellii G.Kunkel
- Aichryson brevipetalum Praeger
- Aichryson × buchii Bañares
- Aichryson × cumbrense Bañares
- Aichryson dichotomum (DC.) Webb & Berthel.
- Aichryson divaricatum (Aiton) Praeger
- Aichryson dumosum (Lowe) Praeger
- Aichryson laxum (Haw.) Bramwell
- Aichryson pachycaulon Bolle (five subspecies have been recognized)
- Aichryson palmense Webb ex Bolle
- Aichryson parlatorei Bolle
- Aichryson porphyrogennetos Bolle
- Aichryson × praegeri G.Kunkel
- Aichryson punctatum (C.Sm. ex Link) Webb & Berthel.
- Aichryson roseum Bañares
- Aichryson santamariensis M.Moura, Carine & M.Seq.
- Aichryson tortuosum (Aiton) Webb & Berthel. – gouty houseleek
- Aichryson villosum (Aiton) Webb & Berthel.
