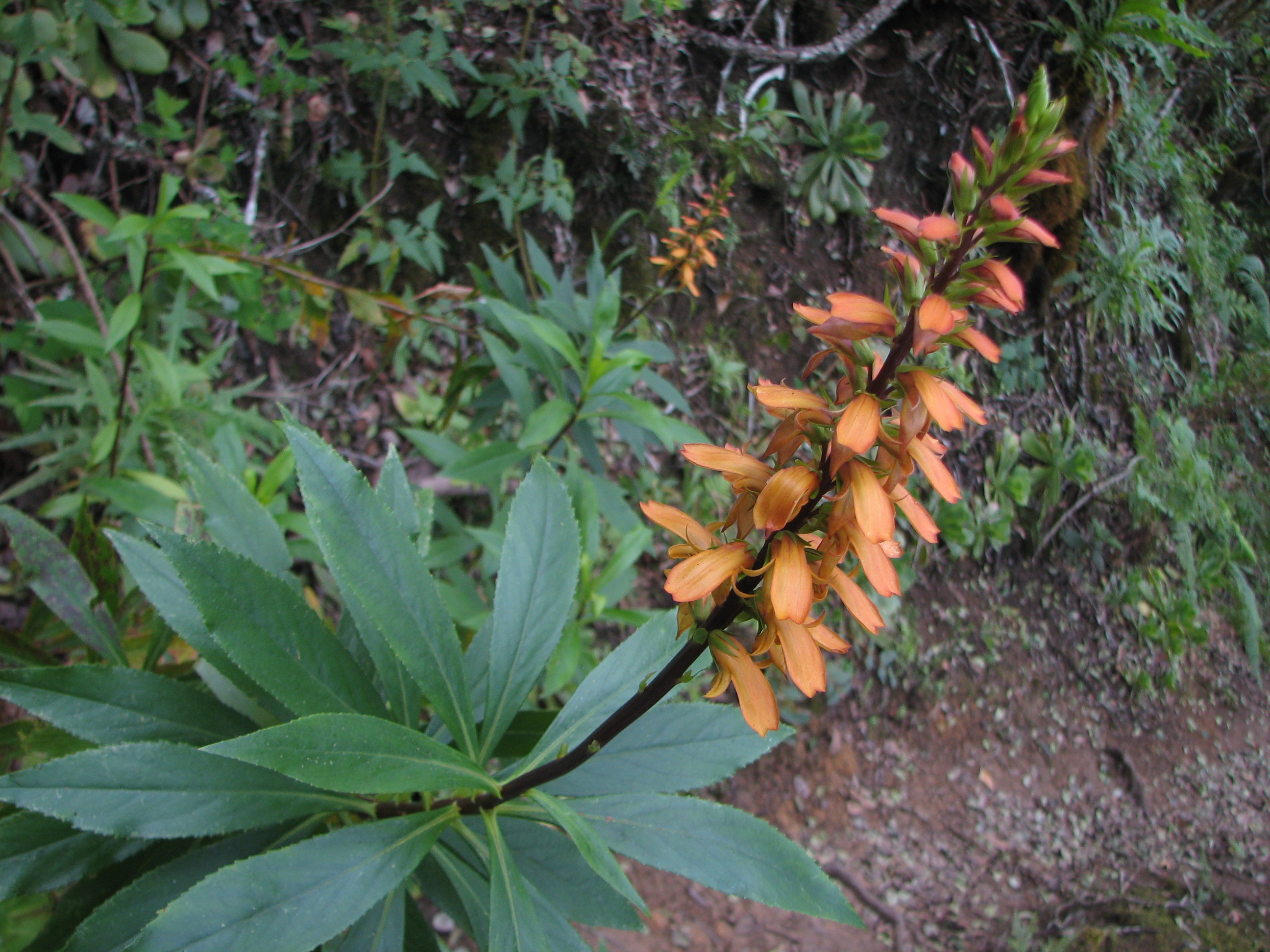

Scientific classification
- Kingdom: Plantae
- Clade: Embryophytes
- Clade: Tracheophytes
- Clade: Angiosperms
- Clade: Eudicots
- Clade: Asterids
- Order: Lamiales
- Family: Plantaginaceae
- Genus: Digitalis
- Species: D. canariensis

Binomial name
- Digitalis canariensis L.

Synonyms
- Isoplexis canariensis (L.) Loudon; Callianassa canariensis (L.) Webb & Berthel.; Digitalis lurida Salisb.; Digitalis canariensis f. glaberrima (Kuntze) Ivan; Digitalis canariensis f. tomentosa (Kuntze) Ivan; Digitalis lurida Salisb.; Isoplexis canariensis var. glaberrima Kuntze; Isoplexis canariensis f. glaberrima (Kuntze) K.Werner; Isoplexis canariensis var. tomentosa Kuntze; Isoplexis canariensis f. tomentosa (Kuntze) K.Werner

= Digitalis canariensis =

Species of flowering plant

Digitalis canariensis (common name: Canary Island foxglove) is a member of the genus Digitalis.

== Taxonomy ==
This species is part of section Isoplexis, which was temporarily accepted as a separate genus. The synonym Isoplexis canariensis also continues to be used. In general, as of 2017, opinions concerning the taxonomic status of Isoplexis species differ depending on the source.

== Description ==
Individuals of these species are evergreen plants growing into rounded shrubs up to 150 cm (59 in) tall. The plant has lanceolate-ovoid leaves with toothed margins. The leaves are spirally arranged. The inflorescence is a cluster of orange-reddish flowers up to 3 cm (1.2 in) in length, with short petals and noticeable upper and lower lip. Bird pollination by the island populations of Phylloscopus species has been documented. The fruit is a capsule.

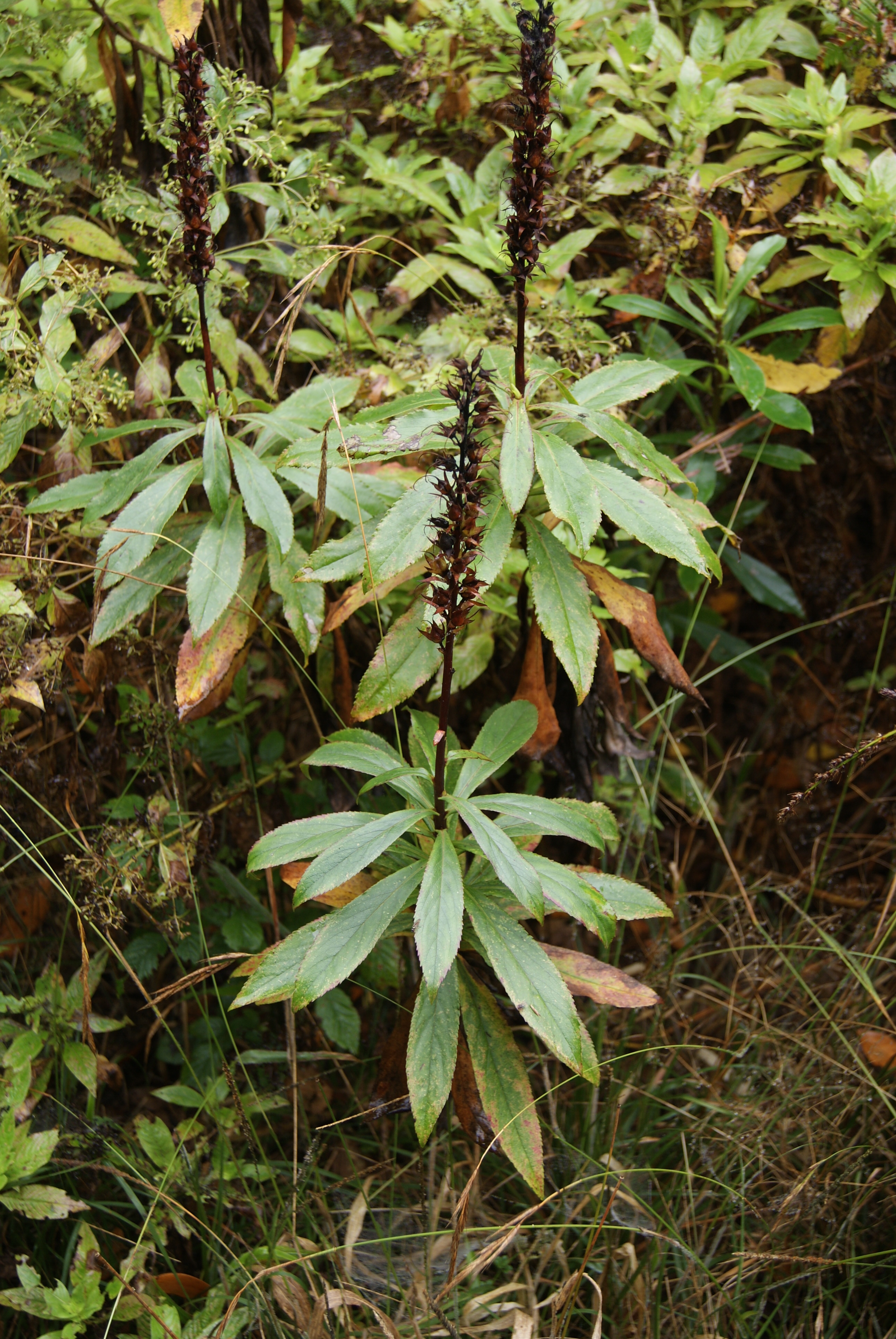
D. canariensis, fruit

Digitalis canariensis contains cardenolides (cardiac glycosides), which are toxic. Medical use is documented, primarily historical in nature.

== Distribution ==
Digitalis canariensis is endemic to the Canary Islands where it occurs on the islands of Tenerife, La Gomera and La Palma. It grows in laurel forest and Erica arborea woods.
