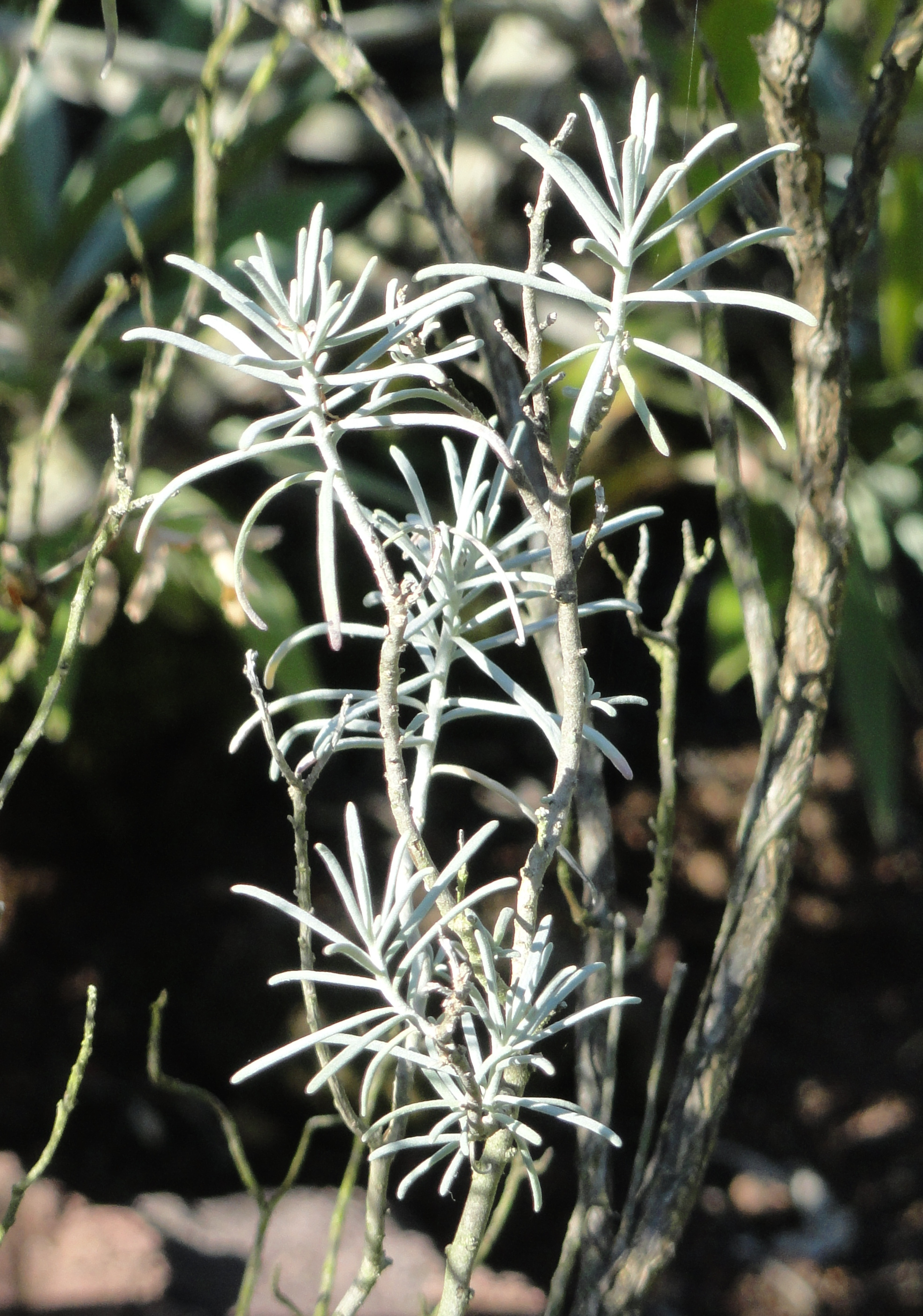
- Parolinia intermedia

Scientific classification
- Kingdom: Plantae
- Clade: Tracheophytes
- Clade: Angiosperms
- Clade: Eudicots
- Clade: Rosids
- Order: Brassicales
- Family: Brassicaceae
- Genus: Parolinia; Webb

Species
- See text

Synonyms
- Diploceras Meisn.

= Parolinia =

Genus of flowering plants

Parolinia is a genus of flowering plants in the family Brassicaceae. It is endemic to the Canary Islands.

== Species ==
Six species are accepted.

- Parolinia filifolia G.Kunkel
- Parolinia glabriuscula Montelongo & Bramwell
- Parolinia intermedia Svent. & Bramwell
- Parolinia ornata Webb
- Parolinia platypetala G.Kunkel
- Parolinia schizogynoides Svent.
