= Aichryson bollei =

Scientific classification
- Kingdom: Plantae
- Clade: Embryophytes
- Clade: Tracheophytes
- Clade: Angiosperms
- Clade: Eudicots
- Order: Saxifragales
- Family: Crassulaceae
- Genus: Aichryson
- Species: A. bollei

Binomial name
- Aichryson bollei Webb ex. Bolle.

Species of flowering plant

Aichryson bollei is a species of herbaceous flowering plants in the family Crassulaceae. It is endemic to the island of La Palma, Canary Islands. The species was first published by the German botanist Carl August Bolle in 1859 after an earlier description by Philip Barker Webb.
