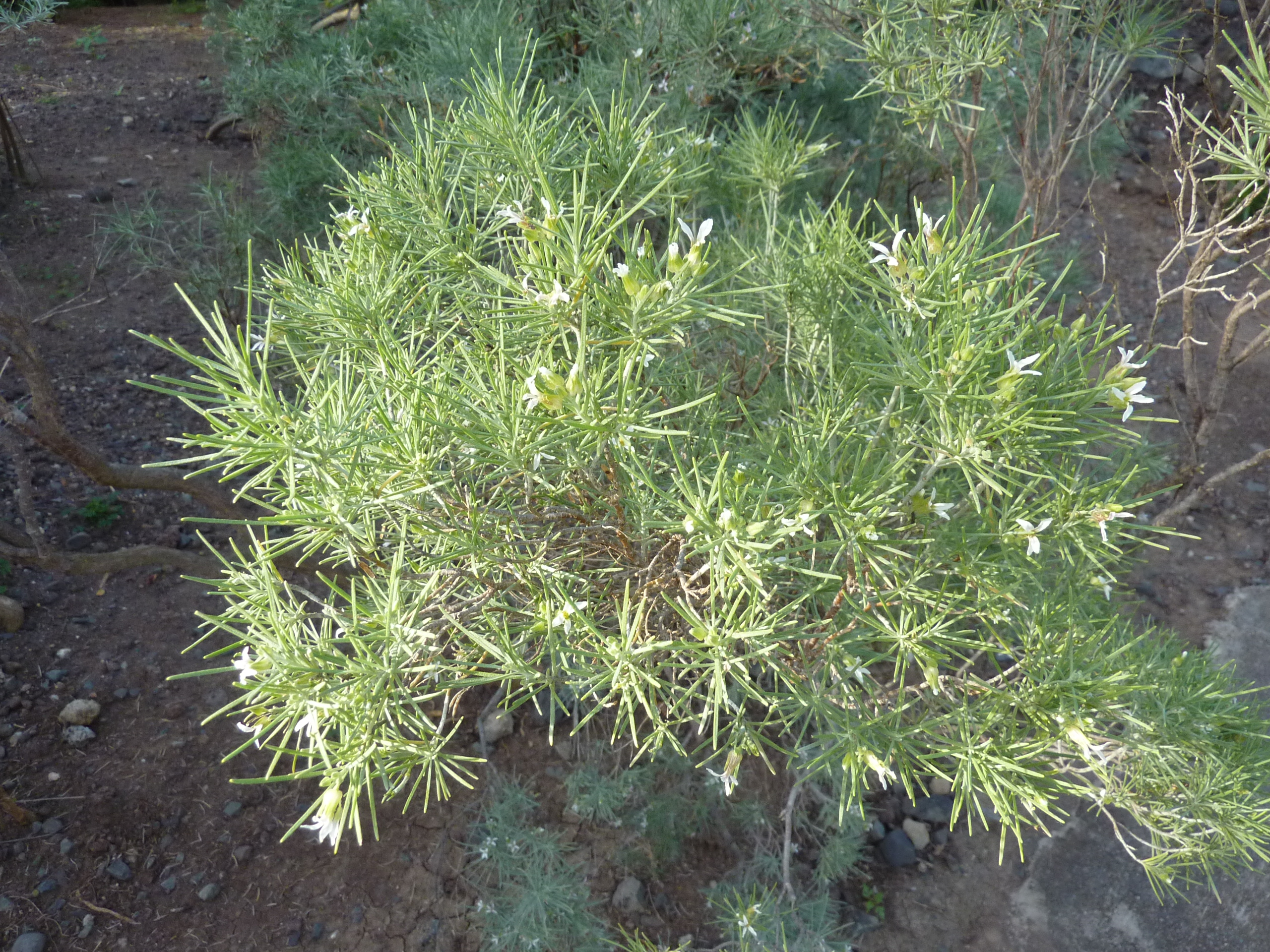

Scientific classification
- Kingdom: Plantae
- Clade: Tracheophytes
- Clade: Angiosperms
- Clade: Eudicots
- Clade: Rosids
- Order: Brassicales
- Family: Brassicaceae
- Genus: Parolinia
- Species: P. ornata

Binomial name
- Parolinia ornata Webb

= Parolinia ornata =

Species of flowering plant

Parolinia ornata is a species of flowering plants in the family Brassicaceae. It is a shrub endemic to the island of Gran Canaria in the Canary Islands of Spain.
