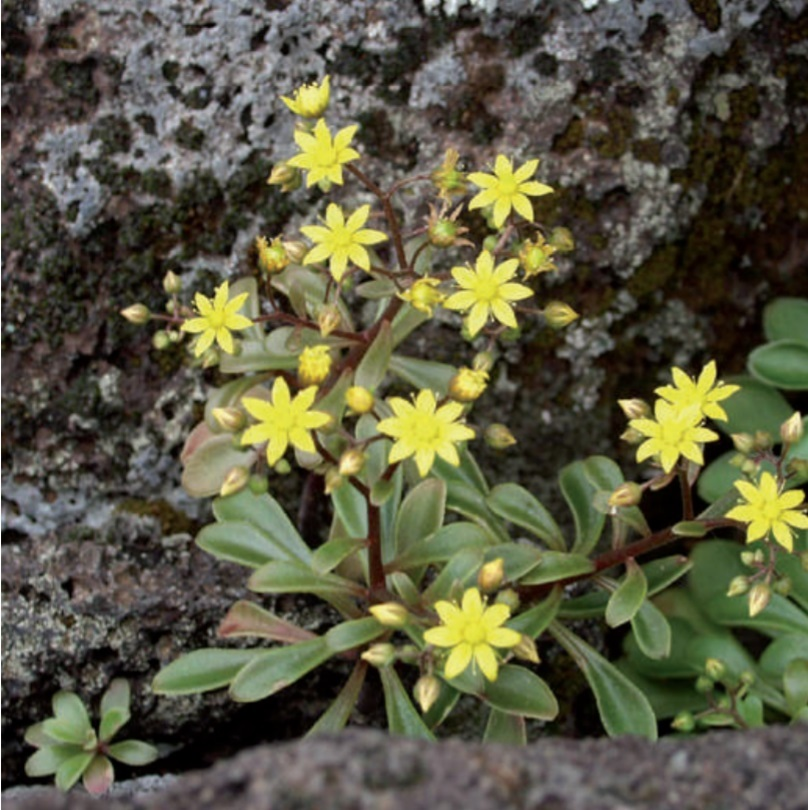

Conservation status
- Critically Endangered (IUCN 3.1)

Scientific classification
- Kingdom: Plantae
- Clade: Tracheophytes
- Clade: Angiosperms
- Clade: Eudicots
- Order: Saxifragales
- Family: Crassulaceae
- Genus: Aichryson
- Species: A. dumosum

Binomial name
- Aichryson dumosum (Lowe) Praeger

Synonyms
- Sempervivum dumosum Lowe

= Aichryson dumosum =

Species of flowering plant

Aichryson dumosum is a critically endangered species of succulent plant of the family Crassulaceae endemic to Madeira.

== Description ==
Aichryson dumosum is a glandular plant up to 38 centimetres (15 in) in height, with reddish purple branches. Flowers are 8–10 millimetres (0.31–0.39 in) in diagonal, most with 7 petals, in loose summits. Petals 4–5 millimetres (0.16–0.20 in), lanceolate, bright golden yellow with a dorsal central rib.

== Distribution and habitat ==
The species is endemic to one single locality on Calheta Municipality, Madeira Island and is estimated to have around 50 to 250 individuals occupying only 100 square metres (1,100 sq ft). It grows in crevices and sheltered areas typical for micro-habitats consisting of an agglomeration of rocks.

It is mainly threatened by invasive species, trampling, fires, droughts and landslides.
