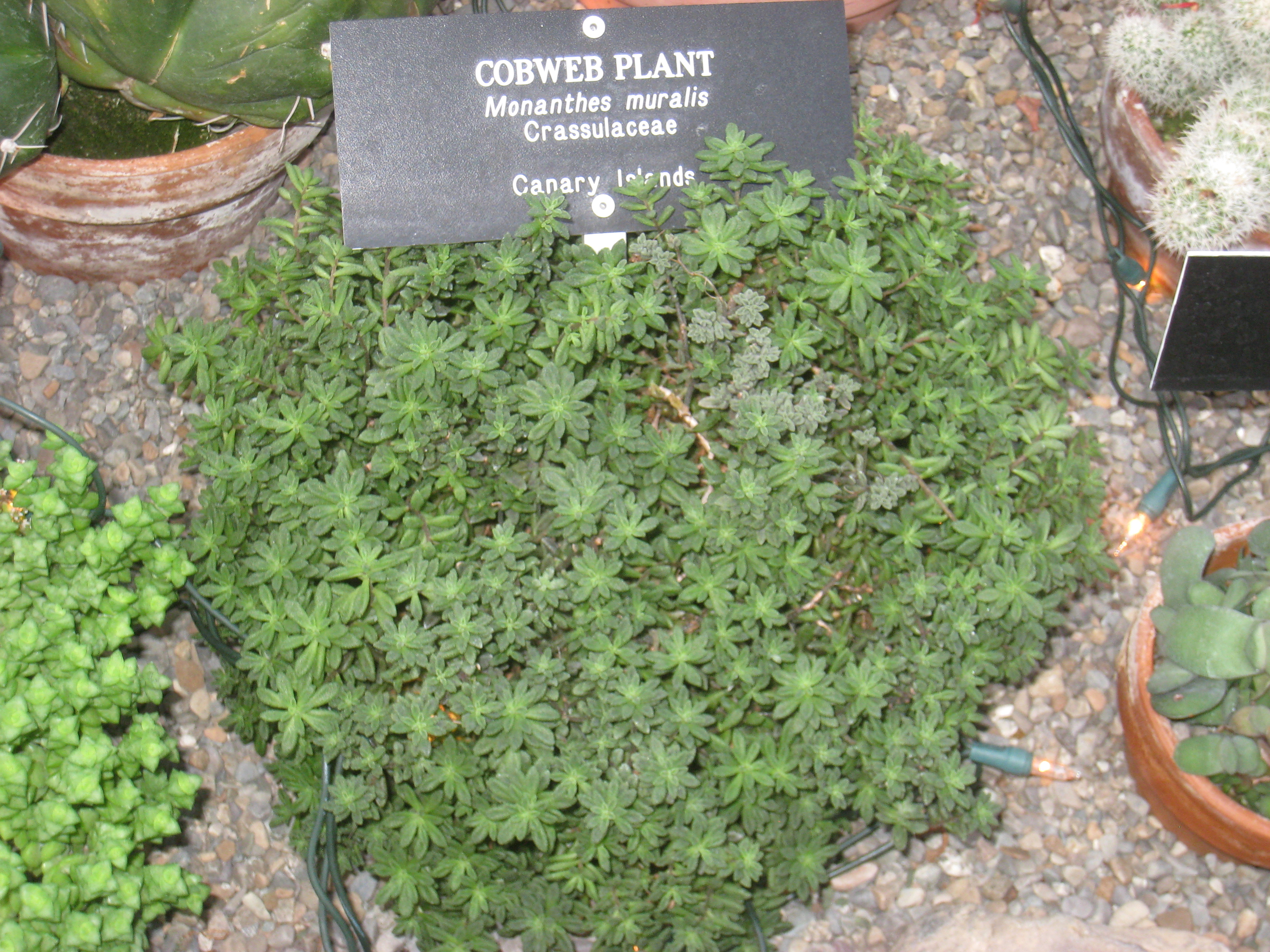

Scientific classification
- Kingdom: Plantae
- Clade: Tracheophytes
- Clade: Angiosperms
- Clade: Eudicots
- Order: Saxifragales
- Family: Crassulaceae
- Genus: Monanthes
- Species: M. muralis

Binomial name
- Monanthes muralis (Webb ex Bolle) Hook.f.

Synonyms
- Petrophyes muralis Webb ex Bolle Sempervivum monanthes var. murale (Webb ex Bolle) Kuntze

= Monanthes muralis =

Species of succulent

Monanthes muralis is a species of flowering plant in the genus Monanthes. It forms small, succulent bushes with green flowers. It is endemic to the Canary Islands.

The Latin specific epithet muralis is derived from the Latin word meaning 'growing on the wall'
