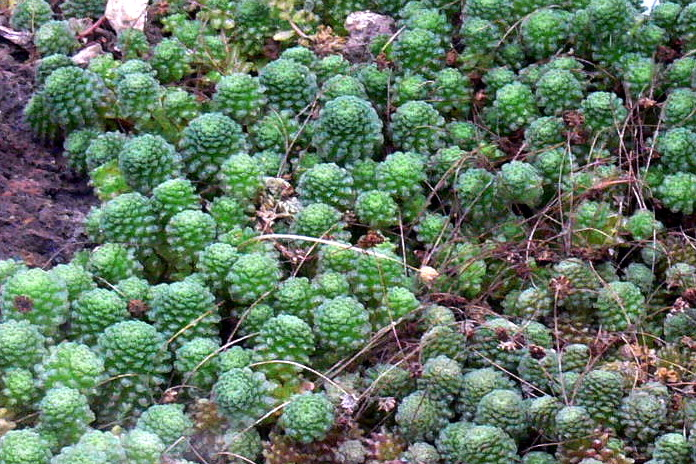
- Monanthes pallens

Scientific classification
- Kingdom: Plantae
- Clade: Tracheophytes
- Clade: Angiosperms
- Clade: Eudicots
- Order: Saxifragales
- Family: Crassulaceae
- Subfamily: Sempervivoideae
- Tribe: Aeonieae
- Genus: Monanthes; Haw.

= Monanthes =

Genus of succulents

Monanthes is a genus of small, succulent, subtropical plants of the family Crassulaceae. Most species in the genus are endemic to the Canary Islands, with one species also endemic to the Savage Islands and another to the High Atlas mountains of Morocco. Its center of diversity is Tenerife, with seven species occurring on this island. On Fuerteventura and Lanzarote, only M. laxiflora occurs. Monanthes is a rare example where a species re-colonizes the continent from an island, after their ancestors have colonized the island from the continent.

Monanthes are not frost-resistant. They are linked with the genera Sempervivum, Greenovia, Aichryson and Aeonium, which is obvious from their similar flowers.

Species of Monanthes differ considerably in life- and growth-form. M. icterica, which is also genetically quite distant to other Monanthes species, is annual, while the other species are perennial.

== Taxonomy ==
Accepted species include:

- Monanthes anagensis Praeger
- Monanthes atlantica J.Ball
- Monanthes brachycaulos (Webb & Bertholt) R.Lowe
- Monanthes icterica (Webb ex Bolle) Christ
- Monanthes laxiflora (DC.) Bolle ex Bornmuller
- Monanthes lowei (Paiva) Perez & Acebes
- Monanthes minima (Bolle) Christ
- Monanthes muralis Hook.f.
- Monanthes pallens (Webb in Christ) Christ
- Monanthes polyphylla (Aiton) Haw.
  - Monanthes polyphylla subsp. amydros Nyffeler
- Monanthes subcrassicaulis (Kuntze) Praeger
- Monanthes subrosulata Bañares & A. Acev.-Rodr.
- Monanthes tilophila (Bolle) Christ
- Monanthes wildpretii Bañares & S.Scholz

=== Etymology ===
Monanthes is Greek for "single flower".

== Bibliography ==
- Mes, T. H. M., Wijers, G. J. & Hart, H. (1997). :Phylogenetic relationships in Monanthes (Crassulaceae) based on morphological, chloroplast and nuclear DNA variation". Journal of Evolutionary Biology 10(2):193–216.
