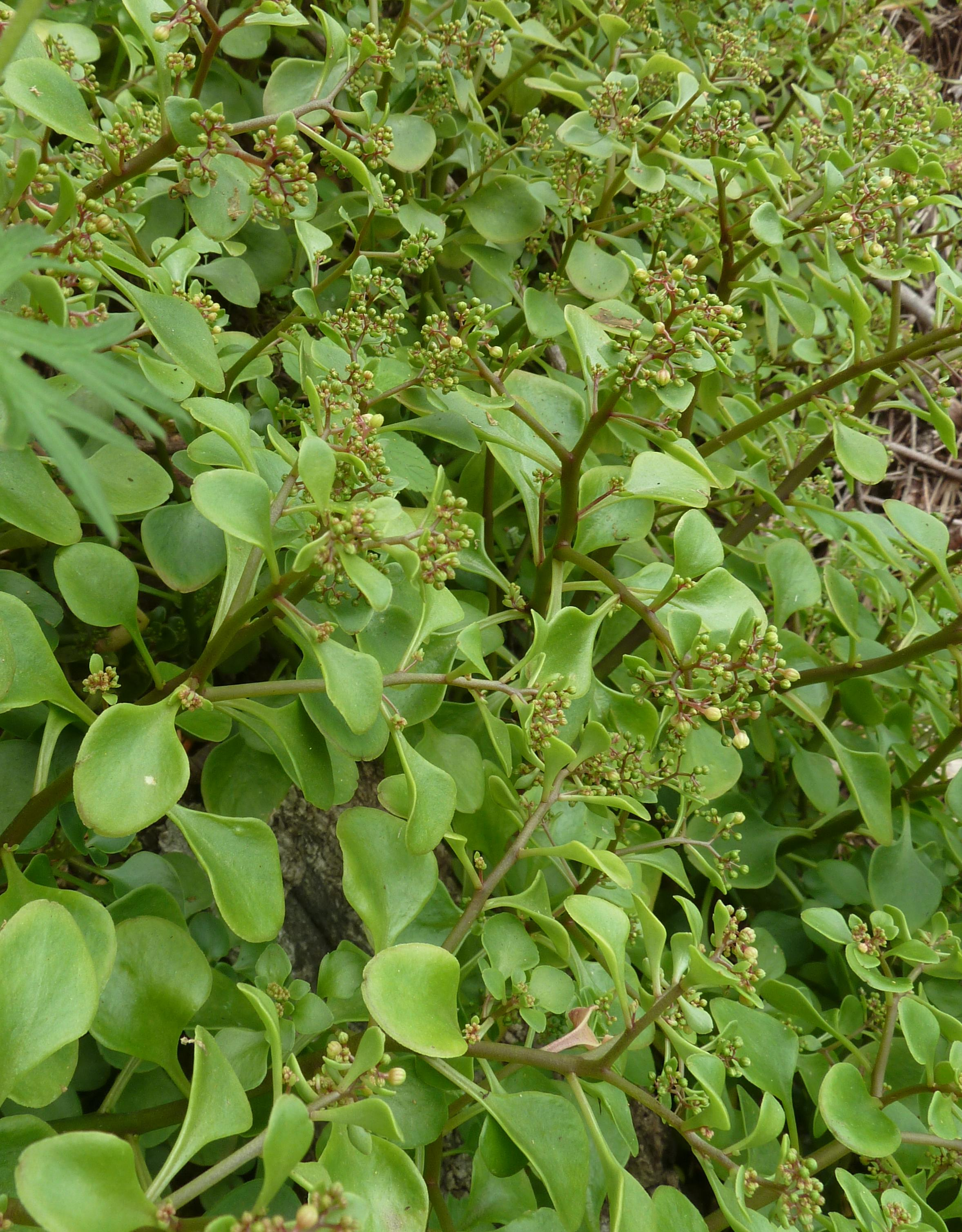

Scientific classification
- Kingdom: Plantae
- Clade: Tracheophytes
- Clade: Angiosperms
- Clade: Eudicots
- Order: Saxifragales
- Family: Crassulaceae
- Genus: Aichryson
- Species: A. divaricatum

Binomial name
- Aichryson divaricatum (Aiton) Praeger

Synonyms
- Anacampseros divaricata Bolle; Sedum divaricatum Ait. (1852); Sempervivum divaricatum (Bolle) Murray; Sempervivum divaricatum var. politum Lowe; Sempervivum divaricatum var. pubescens Lowe

= Aichryson divaricatum =

Species of flowering plant

Aichryson divaricatum is a species of succulent plant of the family Crassulaceae endemic to Madeira.

== Description ==
It is usually smooth and glabrous, 4 to 30 centimetres (1.6 to 11.8 in) tall and green. It has a dark green, ascending stem. Flowers are 6–10 millimetres (0.24–0.39 in) in diagonal, most with 7-petals, in dense summits. Petals are 3–5 millimetres (0.12–0.20 in), ovate, short aristated, pale golden yellow, with a central dorsal rib.

== Distribution ==
The species is endemic to Madeira Island and Desertas Islands and is commonly found on rocks over levadas, cliffs, walls, ravines and sometimes on tree trunks between 100 and 1,000 metres (330 and 3,280 ft) in altitude.

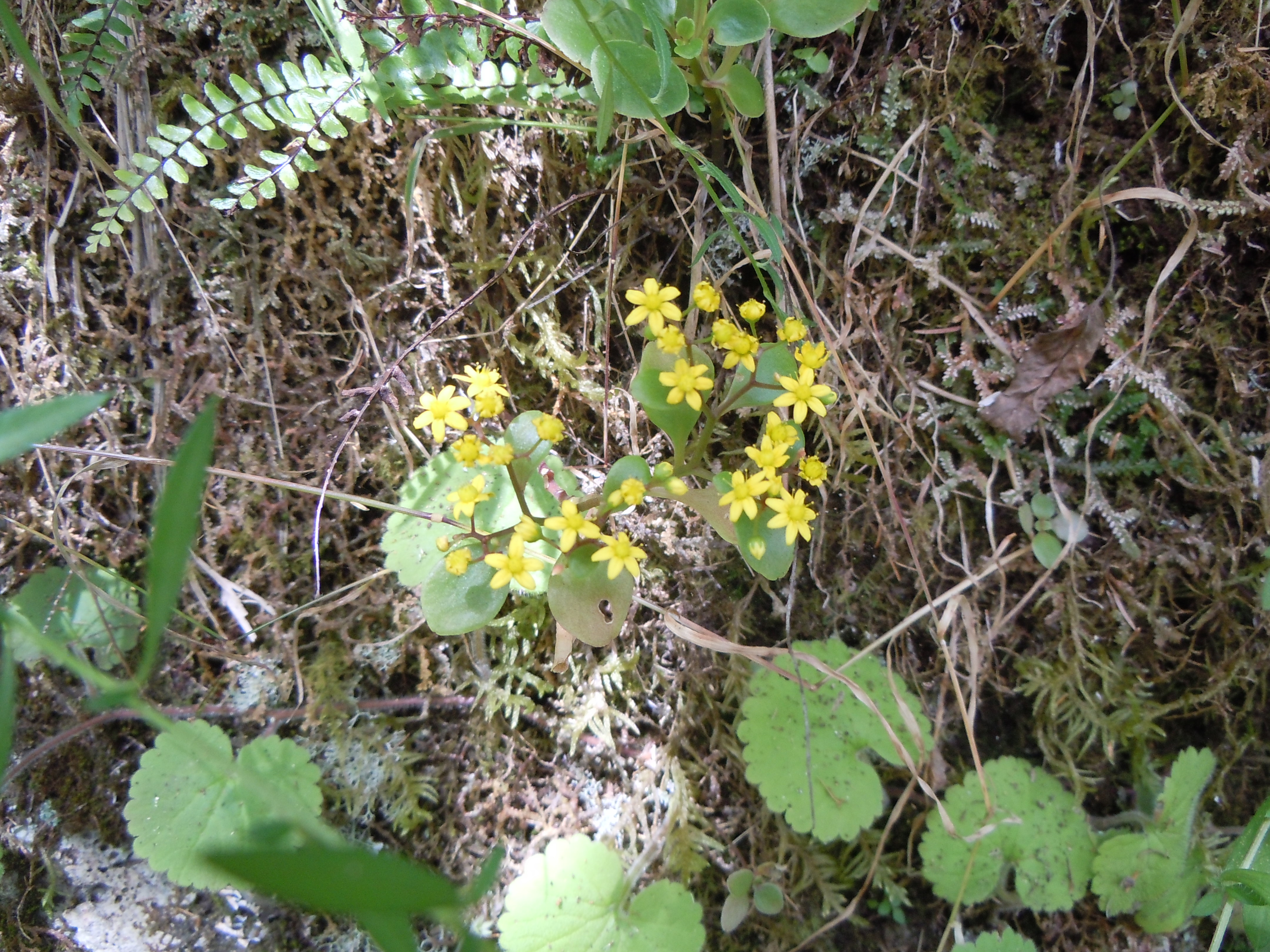
