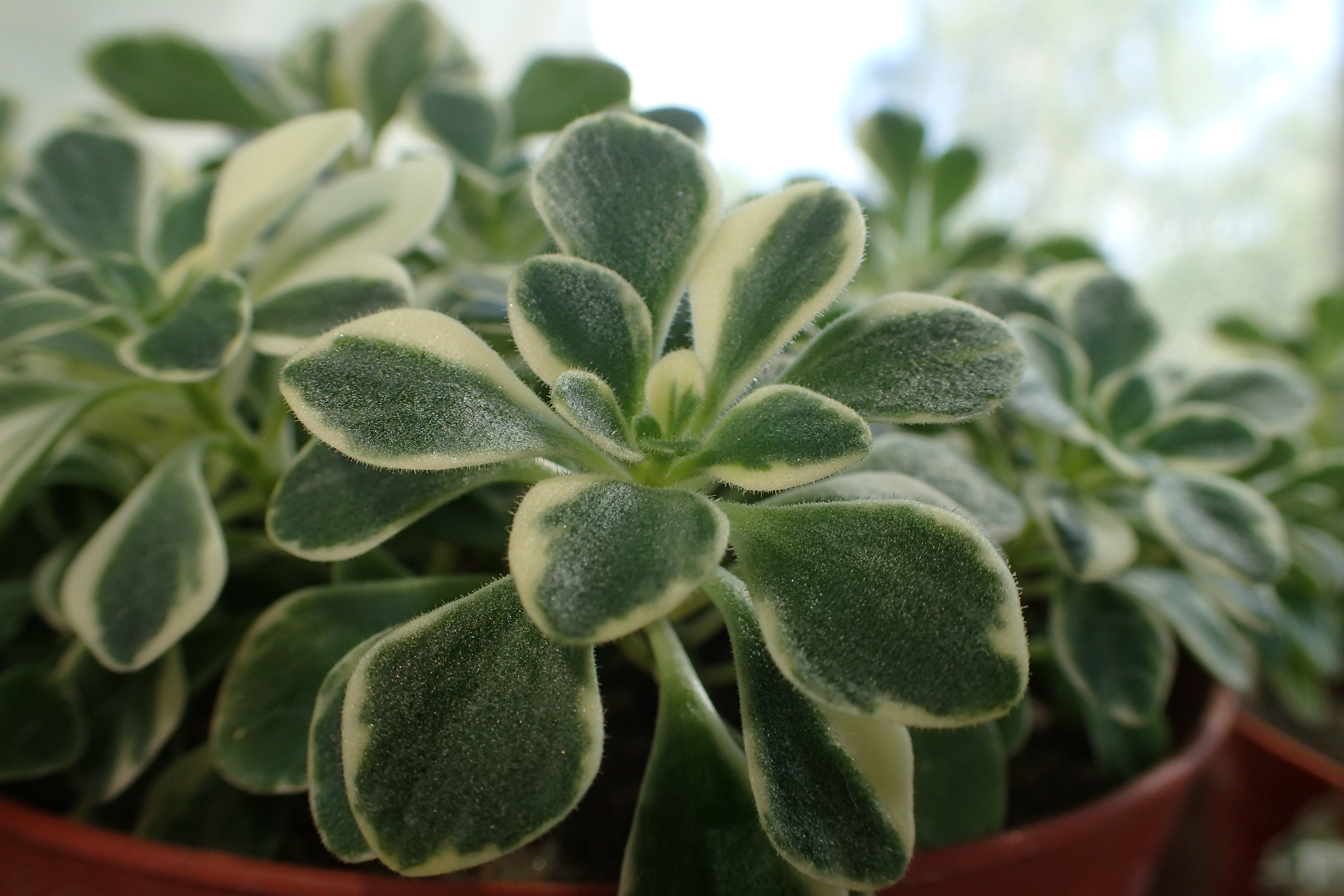
- Aichryson × aizoides 'Variegatum' cultivar

Scientific classification
- Kingdom: Plantae
- Clade: Tracheophytes
- Clade: Angiosperms
- Clade: Eudicots
- Order: Saxifragales
- Family: Crassulaceae
- Genus: Aichryson
- Species: A. × aizoides

Binomial name
- Aichryson × aizoides (Lam.) E.C.Nelson

Synonyms
- List: × Aeonichryson aizoides (Lam.) P.V.Heath; Aeonium domesticum (Praeger) A.Berger; Aichryson × aizoides var. domesticum (Praeger) E.C.Nelson; Aichryson × domesticum Praeger; Sedum × aizoides (Lam.) DC.; Sempervivum × aizoides Lam.; Sempervivum × domesticum Praeger

= Aichryson × aizoides =

Hybrid species of flowering plant

Aichryson × aizoides, youth-and-old-age, is a hybrid species of flowering plant in the family Crassulaceae, native to the Canary Islands. Its parents are Aichryson tortuosum × Aichryson punctatum. A succulent, its 'Variegatum' cultivar has gained the Royal Horticultural Society's Award of Garden Merit as a houseplant.
