= Aichryson santamariensis =

Scientific classification
- Kingdom: Plantae
- Clade: Tracheophytes
- Clade: Angiosperms
- Clade: Eudicots
- Order: Saxifragales
- Family: Crassulaceae
- Genus: Aichryson
- Species: A. santamariensis

Binomial name
- Aichryson santamariensis M. Moura, Carine & M. Seq.

Species of plant

Aichryson santamariensis is a species of plant endemic to the island of Santa Maria in the Azores. This species was previously part of the similar Aichryson villosum, restricted now only to the neighboring Madeira.
