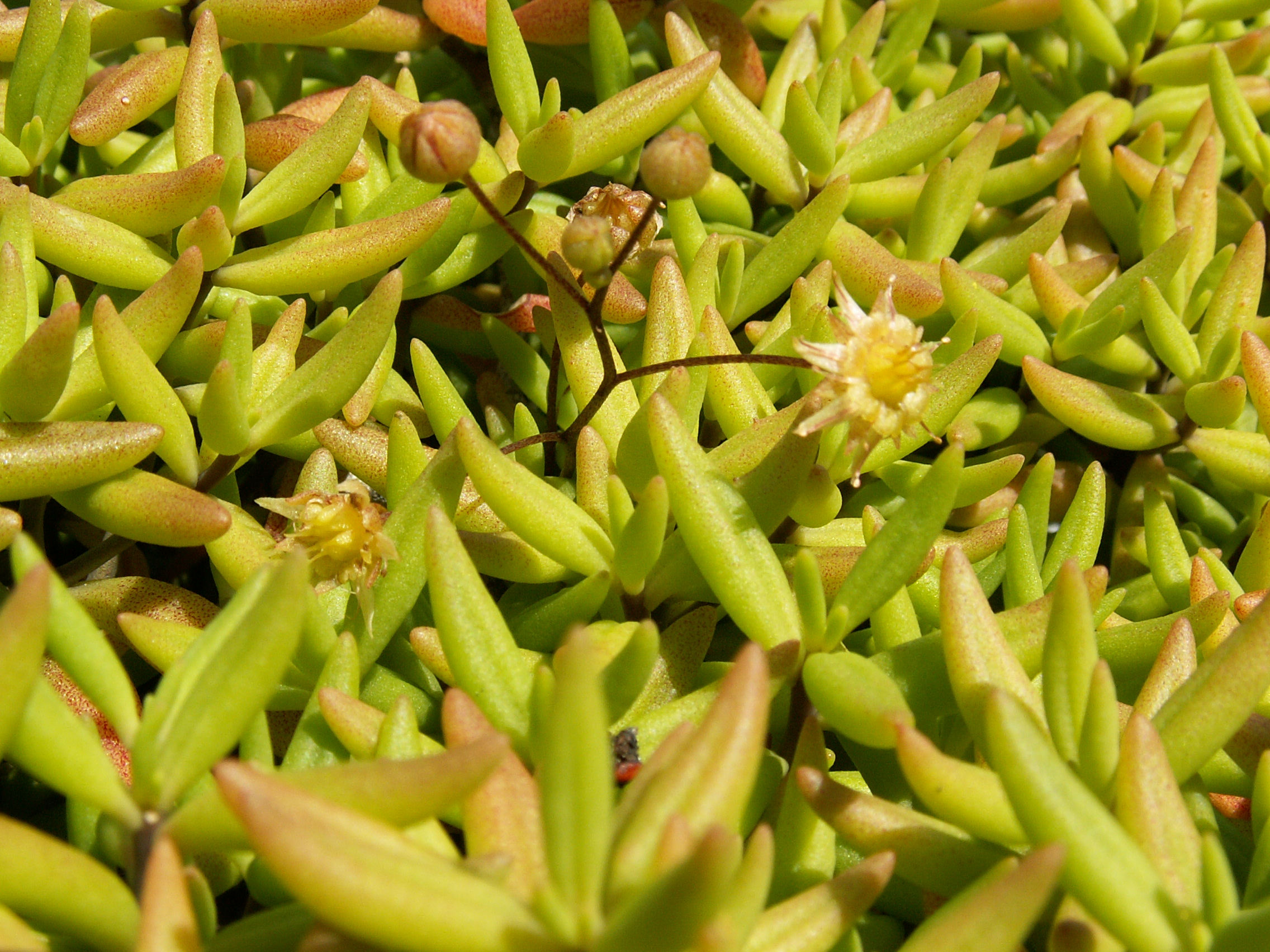

Scientific classification
- Kingdom: Plantae
- Clade: Tracheophytes
- Clade: Angiosperms
- Clade: Eudicots
- Order: Saxifragales
- Family: Crassulaceae
- Genus: Monanthes
- Species: M. anagensis

Binomial name
- Monanthes anagensis Praeger

= Monanthes anagensis =

Species of succulent

Monanthes anagensis is the largest species in the genus Monanthes, forming little bushes about 15 centimetres (5.9 in) high. Leaves are laxly spaced, linear-elliptic, quite smooth, and 1.5–2 centimetres (0.6–0.8 in) long. When stunted, it somewhat resembles Monanthes laxiflora but differs from any form of that variable species in its distinctly shrubby habit, alternate (not opposite) longer and narrower leaves which are green, red, or purplish, never grey, and ovoid buds, the buds of M. laxiflora being broader than long.

== Habitat ==
Canary Islands; local endemic of the island of Tenerife and abundant along the watershed of the Anaga Mountains, at an altitude of 600–1,000 metres (2,000–3,300 ft).

== Description ==
A small, erect, glabrous, much-branched sub-shrub, up to 15 centimetres (5.9 in) high and wide. Roots fibrous. Branches grey, tortuous, bare save near the apices (more leafy in cultivation). Leaves alternate, not rosulate, sessile, glabrous, linear-elliptic (or in cultivation linear), rather blunt, subtereta, flattish and channelled on face, about 1.5 cm (in cultivation up to 2.5 cm) long, 4 mm broad, 3 mm thick, green, in exposure red or purple. Inflorescence pseudo-terminal, 2 to 6 flowered, racemose, pedicels glabrous, filiform, up to 2.5 cm long. Buds broadly ovoid. Flowers 7-parted, 1 cm across, greenish-yellow. Calyx glabrous, cut halfway down into deltoid subacute segments. Petals deltoid-lanceolate, acute, 4 mm long, greenish-yellow with reddish nerve. Stamens nearly equaling the petals, filaments reddish, anthers yellow. Scales 1 mm long, 1,5mm broad, narrow below, expanded above into two subcircular scrabid pale green lobes. Carpels 2,5 mm long, the short styles at first erect, later divergent. Flowering May–June.
