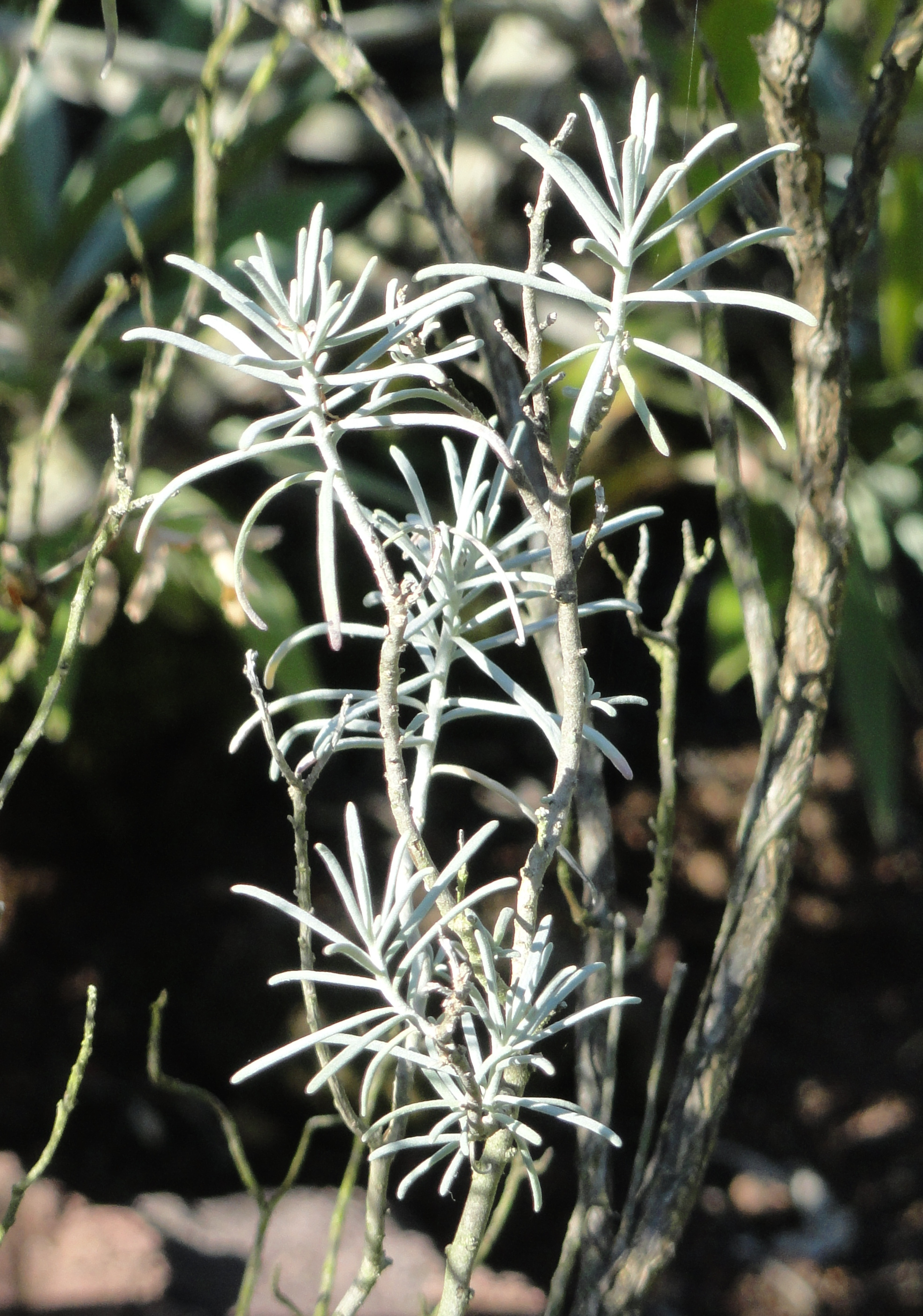

Scientific classification
- Kingdom: Plantae
- Clade: Tracheophytes
- Clade: Angiosperms
- Clade: Eudicots
- Clade: Rosids
- Order: Brassicales
- Family: Brassicaceae
- Genus: Parolinia
- Species: P. intermedia

Binomial name
- Parolinia intermedia Svent. & Bramwell

= Parolinia intermedia =

Species of flowering plant

Parolinia intermedia is a species of flowering plants in the family Brassicaceae. It is native to the island of Tenerife in the Canary Islands of Spain.
