= Natural History of the Canary Islands =

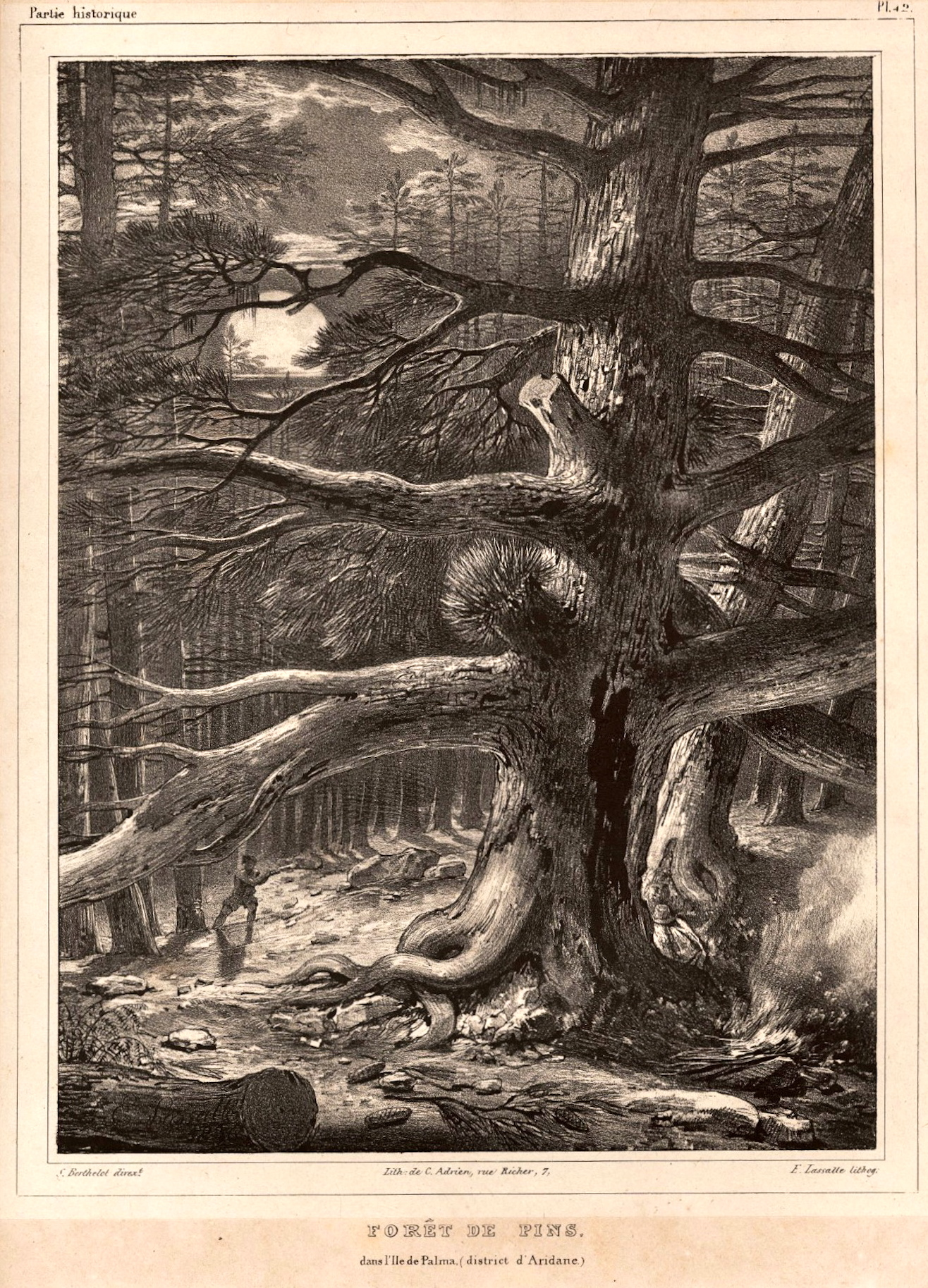
Forest of Pines, illustration from the book

Natural History of the Canary Islands (French: Histoire Naturelle des Îles Canaries) is an illustrated reference work of the natural history of the Canary Islands. It was written by the English botanist Philip Barker-Webb and the French naturalist and ethnologist Sabin Berthelot, in cooperation with several other scientists. It was published in Paris between 1836 and 1850. The work is considered the most important 19th-century text about the Canary Islands in the field of natural sciences.

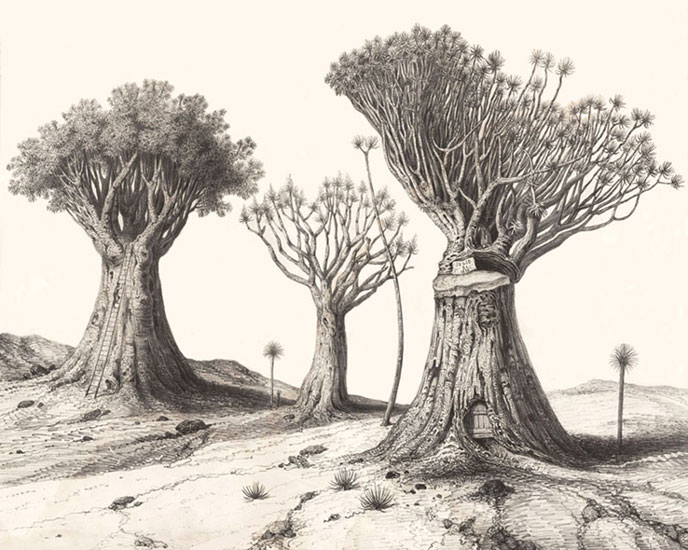
The Great dragon tree, illustration from the book

The work consists of three main parts and nine volumes:

- Volume 1-1: ethnography and the annals of conquest
- Volume 1-2: Canarian miscellany (travel, excursions, various observations etc.)
- Volume 2-1: geography, statistics and geology
- Volume 2-2: zoology
- Volume 3-1: botanical geography
- Volume 3-2: Canarian phytography (in 4 volumes)

Most of the work is written in French, except the phytography part, which consists of scientific descriptions of plants in Latin.
