= Sabin Berthelot =

French naturalist and ethnologist (1794–1880)

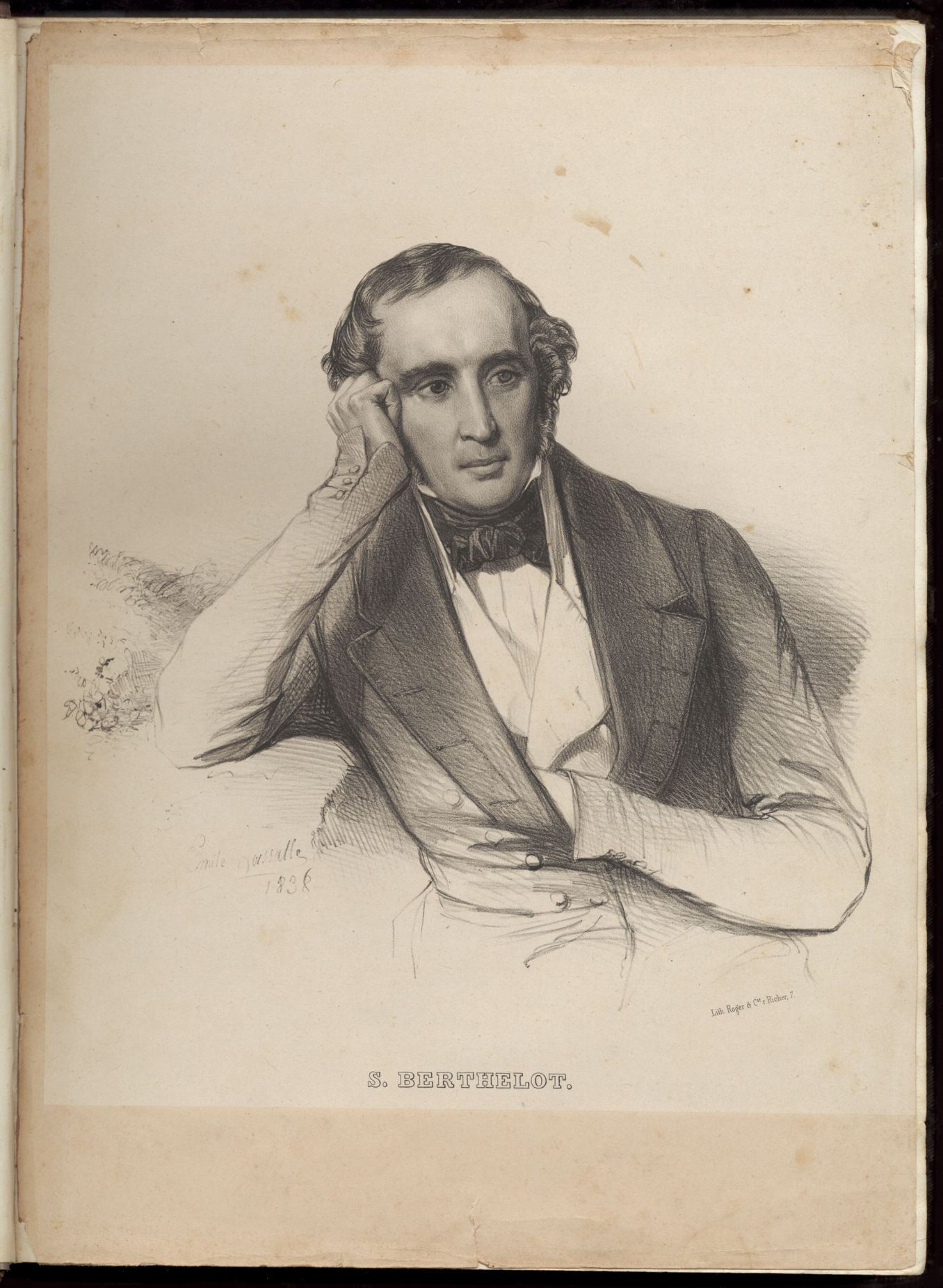
- Born: 4 April 1794; Marseille, France
- Died: 10 November 1880 (aged 86)
- Occupations: Naturalist and ethnologist
- Scientific career
- Author abbrev. (botany): Berthel.

Sabin Berthelot (English: /bɛərtəˈloʊ/ ber-tə-LOH, French: [sabɛ̃ bɛʁtəlo]; 4 April 1794 – 10 November 1880) was a French naturalist and ethnologist. He was a resident of the Canary Islands for part of his life, and co-authored L'Histoire Naturelle des Îles Canaries (1835–50) with Philip Barker Webb.

== Biography ==
Berthelot was the son of a Marseille merchant. He joined the French Navy and served as a midshipman during the Napoleonic Wars. After the war he joined the merchant fleet, travelling between Marseilles and the West Indies. He first visited the Canary Islands in 1820, where he taught at a school in Tenerife and managed the botanical gardens at Orotava for the Marquis of Villanueva del Prato.

Berthelot studied the natural history of the islands. He was joined in this task by Webb in 1828, and by 1830 they had collected sufficient information for publication. They travelled to Geneva, and produced the first volume of L'Histoire Naturelle des Îles Canaries in 1835. Berthelot concentrated on the ethnography, history and geography of the islands, with Webb completing the natural history sections. The ornithological section was mainly written by Alfred Moquin-Tandon.

In 1845 Berthelot founded the Société d'Ethnologique. In 1846 he returned to Tenerife, and in 1848 was nominated the French consular agent for the island, being promoted to full Consul in 1874. He retired in August 1874, and was given the freedom of the city of Santa Cruz de Tenerife.

Berthelot's other publications on the islands included Les Guanches (1841 and 1845), La Conquète des canaries (1879) and Antiquités Canariennes (1879).

== Legacy ==
The Berthelot's pipit (Anthus berthelotii) was named after him by his friend Carl Bolle.

== Bibliography ==
- Webb, Philip Barker; Berthelot, Sabin (1836–1850). Histoire naturelle des Iles Canaries. Paris: Béthune.
- Biographies for Birdwatchers - Barbara and Richard Mearns ISBN 0-12-487422-3
