= Philip Barker-Webb =

English botanist

Philip Barker Webb FRS
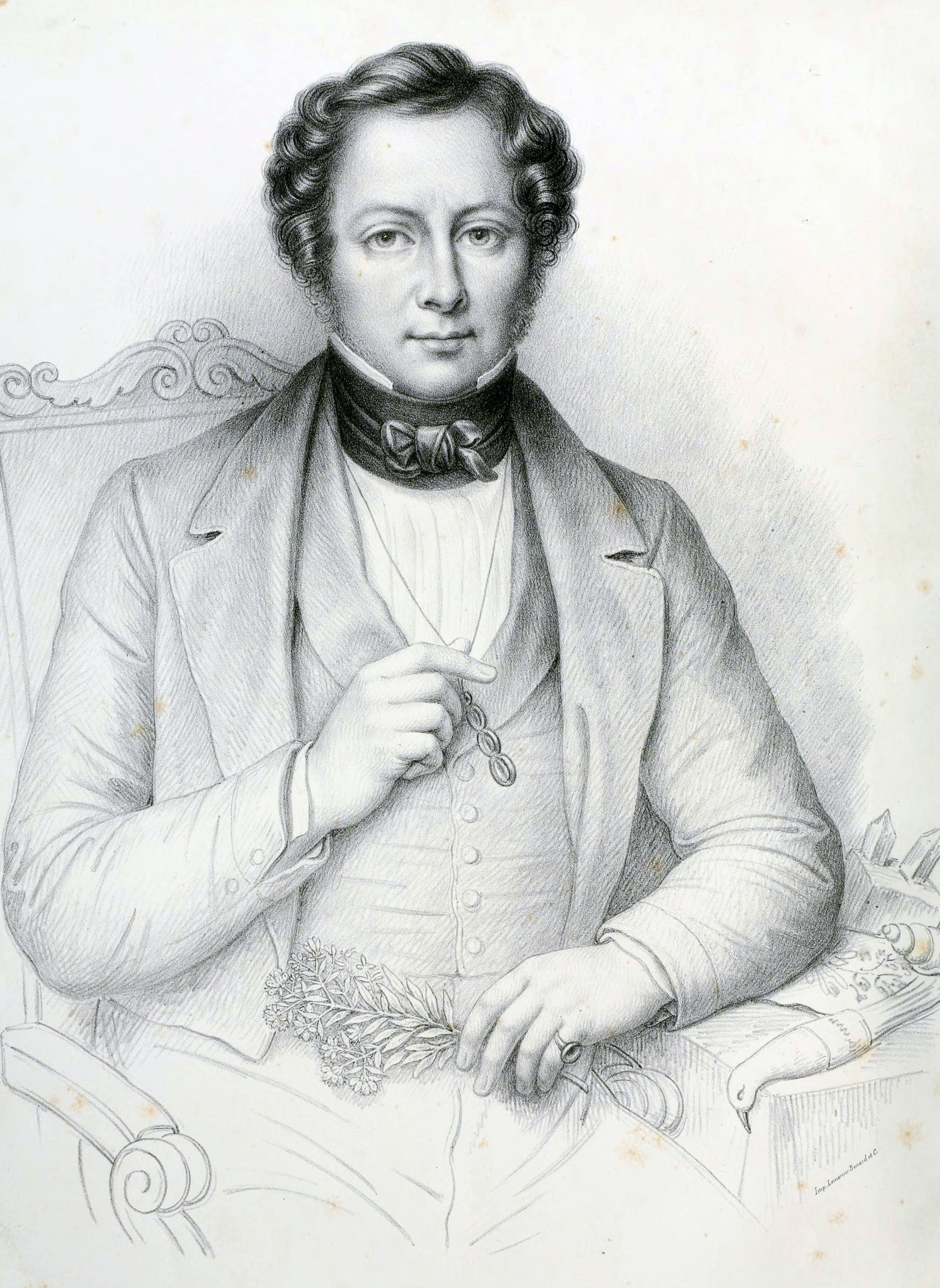
- Born: 10 July 1793
- Died: 31 August 1854 (aged 61)
- Occupation: Botanist
- Scientific career
- Author abbrev. (botany): Webb

Philip Barker Webb FRS (10 July 1793 – 31 August 1854) was an English botanist.

== Life ==
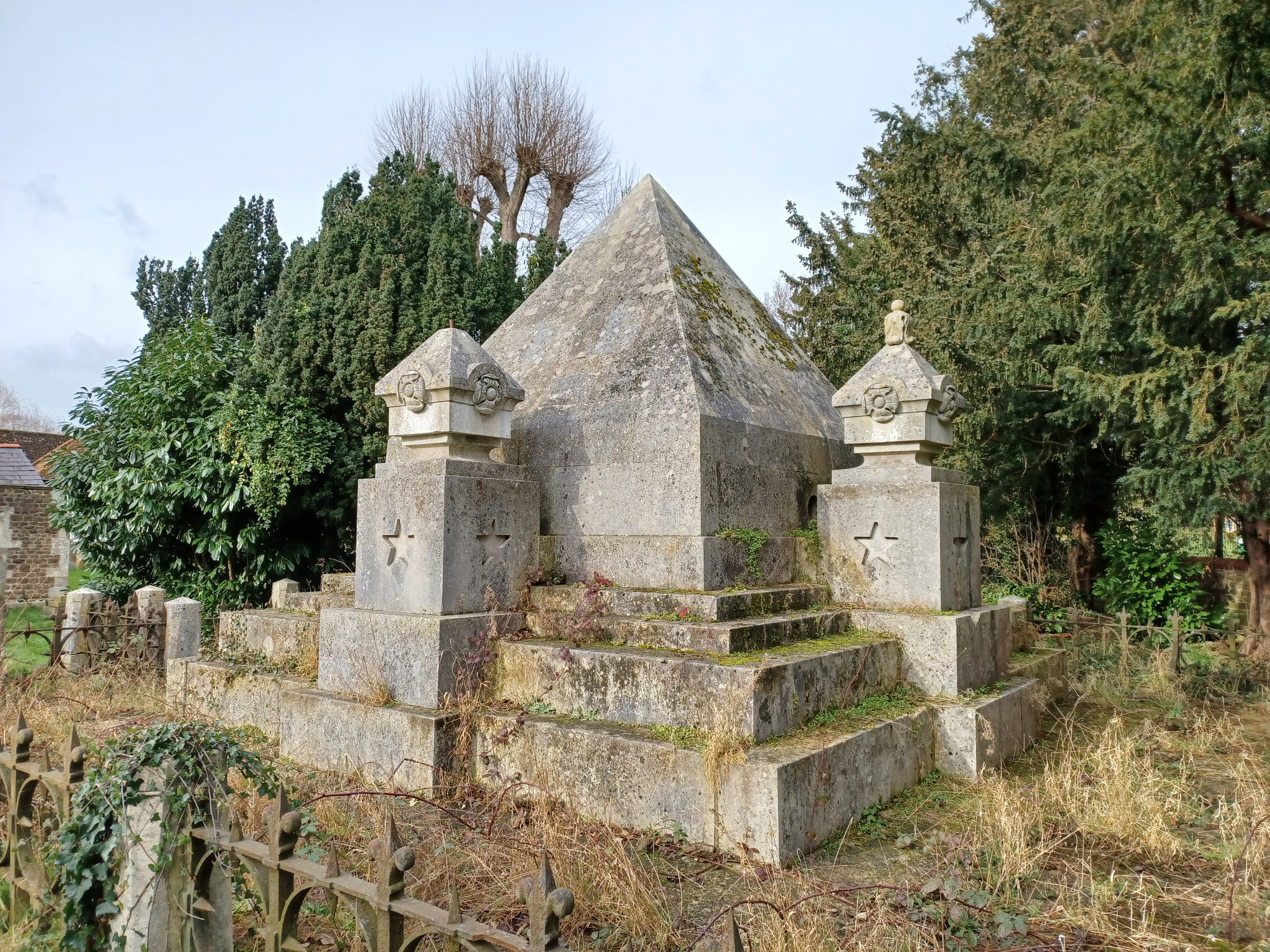
Webb family mausoleum at Milford, Surrey, containing Philip Barker-Webb's tomb

Webb was born to a wealthy, aristocratic family; his father was the lord of the manors of Witley and Milford, in Surrey, England. Webb was educated at Harrow School and Christ Church, Oxford. He collected plants in Italy, Spain, and Portugal, and was the first person to collect in the Tetuan Mountains of Morocco. En route to Brazil he made what was intended to be a brief visit to the Canary Islands, but he stayed for a considerable time, returning after his Brazil expedition.

The results can be seen in the nine-volume Histoire Naturelle des Iles Canaries (Natural History of the Canary Islands), which he co-authored with Sabin Berthelot. In company with Berthelot, who had lived on the islands for some time, Webb collected specimens on the islands between 1828 and 1830. The text of Histoire Naturelle des Iles Canaries took 20 years to complete.

Specialists such as Pierre-Justin-Marie Macquart wrote appropriate parts. Webb's herbarium was bequeathed to the Museo di Storia Naturale di Firenze in Florence, Italy. He settled in Paris, but returned to Italy in the later years of his life, before being struck by illness while travelling in Europe. He died in England in August 1854.

The standard author abbreviation Webb is used to indicate this person as the author when citing a botanical name. The former genera Barkerwebbia and Webbia were named after him.

== Works ==
- Webb, P. B.; Berthelot, S. (1836–1850). Histoire naturelle des Iles Canaries. Paris: Béthune.
- With Theodor von Heldreich he edited the exsiccata Catalogus plantarum hispanicarum in Provincia Giennensi (Provincia de Jaén) anno 1849 a Antonio Blanco lectarum to distribute a series of plant specimens collected by Antonio Blanco.
